= Rita (given name) =

Female given name

- Pronunciation: ˈriːtə
- Gender: Female
- Language: Latin

Origin
- Meaning: Derived from names like Margarita (pearl)

Other names
- Related names: Maggie; Margarita; Margaret; Rhiannon

Rita is a female name, often a name in its own right, but mostly a shortened version of Margarita. The feast day of Rita is generally celebrated on May 22 in honor of Saint Rita of Cascia.

== In media and entertainment ==
=== In film, television and theater ===
- Rita Rani Ahuja (born 1978), American actress
- Rita Avila (born 1964), Filipina actress
- Rita Azevedo Gomes (born 1952), Portuguese film director
- Rita Batata (born 1986), Brazilian actress
- Rita Bell (1893–1992), American singer, entertainer
- Rita Bhaduri (1955–2018), Indian actress
- Rita Blanco (born 1963), Portuguese actress
- Rita Buzzar, Brazilian film producer
- Rita Calderoni (born 1951), Italian actress
- Rita Camarneiro (born 1988), Portuguese comedian and TV presenter
- Rita Carewe (1909–1955), American actress
- Rita Christiani (1917–2008), Trinidad-born African-American dancer
- Rita Cléos (1931–1988), Brazilian actress
- Rita Clermont (1894–1969), German actress
- Rita Corday (1920–1992), American actress
- Rita Cortese (born 1949), Argentine actress
- Rita Dominic (born 1975), Nigerian actress
- Rita Durão (born 1976), Portuguese actress
- Rita Dutta Chakraborty, Bengali film and TV actress
- Rita Edochie, Nigerian actress
- Rita Flynn (1905–1973), American actress
- Rita Gam (1927–2016), American actress
- Rita Gardner (1934–2022), American actress and singer
- Rita Gould (1890–1981), American actress
- Rita Guedes (born 1972), Brazilian actress
- Rita W. Harlan, American actress
- Rita Hayek (born 1987), Lebanese actress and TV presenter
- Rita Hayworth (1918–1987), American actress
- Rita Sririta Jensen (born 1981), Thai model and actress
- Rita Jolivet (1884–1971), American-British actress
- Rita Karin (1919–1993), American actress
- Rita Koiral (1959–2017), Indian actress
- Rita La Roy (1901–1993), American actress
- Rita Lafontaine (1939–2016), Canadian actress
- Rita Livesi (born 1915), Italian film and stage actress
- Rita Lobo (born 1944), Indian actress and singer
- Rita Luna (1770–1832), Spanish stage actress
- Rita Macedo (1925–1993), Mexican actress
- Rita May (actress) (born 1942), British actress
- Rita Moreira (born 1944), Brazilian film director
- Rita Moreno (born 1931), Puerto Rican-born American actress
- Rita Morley (1927–1997), American actress
- Rita Nzelu, Nigerian actress
- Rita Paul (1928–2021), German actress
- Rita Polster (born 1948), Finnish film actress
- Rita Quigley (1923–2008), American actress
- Rita Raave (born 1951), Estonian actress
- Rita Ramnani (born 1981), British actress and dancer
- Rita Ratnayake (1934–2006), Sri Lankan Sinhala cinema actress
- Rita Rätsepp (born 1962), Estonian actress
- Rita Renoir (1934–2016), French strip-teaser and actress
- Rita Roland (1914–1998), American film director
- Rita Romilly Benson (1900–1980), American actress and acting teacher
- Rita Rudner (born 1956), American comedian and writer
- Rita Rusić (born 1960), Croatian producer, actress and singer
- Rita Sacchetto (1880–1959), German dancer, actress and screenwriter
- Rita Savagnone, Italian film actress
- Rita Sever (born 1963), American television hostess and actress
- Rita Simons (born 1977), English actress and singer
- Rita Taggart (born 1947), American actress
- Rita Tushingham (born 1942), English actress
- Rita Verreos (born 1968), Venezuelan TV personality, actress and model
- Rita Volk (born 1990), American actress
- Rita Walter (1951–2022), American actress
- Rita Webb (1904–1981), English actress
- Rita Wilson (born 1956), American actress, singer, and producer
- Rita Wolf (born 1960), British actress

=== In journalism and literature ===
- Rita de Acosta Lydig (1875–1929), American novelist
- Rita Akoto Coker, American novelist
- Rita Banerji, Indian author, photographer and activist
- Rita Barisse (1917–2001), British journalist, writer and translator
- Rita Boumi-Pappa (1906–1984), Greek poet, translator and writer
- Rita Bouvier (born 1950), Métis educator and poet
- Rita Bradshaw (born 1949), British romance novelist
- Rita Brantalou (1948–2021), French humorist
- Rita Braver (born 1948), American journalist
- Rita Mae Brown (born 1944), American writer and activist
- Rita Celli (born 1969), Canadian radio journalist
- Rita Chowdhury, Indian writer
- Rita Ciresi, American novelist
- Rita Cosby (born 1964), American journalist
- Rita Cox (born 1929/1930), librarian and storyteller
- Rita Demeester (1946–1993), Belgian poet and writer
- Rita Deverell (born 1945), Canadian journalist
- Rita Dove (born 1952), American poet
- Rita Clay Estrada (born 1941), romance novelist
- Rita Ferro (writer) (born 1955), Portuguese novelist, writer and journalist
- Rita Gabbai-Simantov, Greek Ladino-language poet and writer
- Rita Gallagher (1921–2004), American novelist
- Rita von Gaudecker (1879–1968), German author
- Rita Golden Gelman (born 1937), American writer
- Rita Guibert (1916–2007), American author, journalist, editor, researcher and translator
- Rita Ann Higgins, Irish writer
- Rita Joe (1932–2007), Mi’kmaq poet
- Rita Kelly (born 1953), Irish poet
- Rita Kerr (1925–2017), American author
- Rita Kogan, Hebrew author and translator
- Rita Kothari (born 1969), Indian author and translator
- Rita Kuczynski (born 1944), German author, philosopher and editorialist
- Rita Marshall (1934–2008), English journalist and editor
- Rita Mestokosho (born 1966), Canadian Innu writer andpoet
- Rita Carla Francesca Monticelli (born 1974), Italian author
- Rita Mulcahy (died 2010), author and public speaker
- Rita Mulier, Belgian feminist author and economist
- Rita Panahi, American-Iranian Australian opinion columnist
- Rita Rait-Kovaleva (1898–1988), Soviet translator and writer
- Rita Reif (1929–2023), American columnist and author
- Rita Mae Reese, American poet
- Rita Sebastian (died 1996), Sri Lankan journalist
- Rita Shell (1863–1950), British magazine editor
- Rita Tainola (born 1954), Finnish reporter
- Rita Tornborg (born 1926), Swedish novelist and short story writer
- Rita Vorperian, Syrian-born American journalist and writer
- Rita Weiman (1885–1954), American screenwriter
- Rita Williams-Garcia (born 1957), American writer of novels
- Rita Wong (born 1968), Canadian poet

=== In music ===
- Rita (Indian singer) (born 1984), stage name of Rita Thyagarajan, an Indian playback singer
- Rita (Israeli singer) (born 1962), stage name of Rita Yahan-Farouz Kleinstein, Persian-born Israeli singer and actress
- Rita (Japanese singer), Japanese voice actress, singer, and lyricist
- Rita Abatzi (1914–1969), Greek singer
- Rita Abrams (born 1943), American musical artist
- Rita Bouboulidi (1926–2014), Greek pianist
- Rita Brondi (1889–1941), Italian composer
- Rita la Cantaora (1859–1937), Spanish singer
- Rita Carpio (born 1965), Hong Kong Cantopop singer
- Rita Chiarelli, Canadian blues singer
- Rita Comisi (born 1985), Italian singer
- Rita Connolly, Irish musical artist
- Rita Coolidge (born 1945), American singer
- Rita Dakota (born 1990), stage name of Belarusian rock singer-songwriter Margarita Sergeevna Gerasimovich
- Rita Damásio (born 1978), Portuguese singer
- Rita Daniela (born 1995), Filipina singer, actress and television host
- Rita Deneve (1944–2018), Belgian singer
- Rita Dev, Hindustani classical singer
- Rita Engedalen (born 1971), Norwegian musician and songwriter
- Rita Eriksen (born 1966), Norwegian singer
- Rita Fornia (1878–1922), American soprano
- Rita Gabussi (1810–1891), Italian opera singer
- Rita Ganguly, Indian classical arts
- Rita Gorr (1926–2012), Belgian operatic mezzo-soprano
- Rita Guerra (born 1967), Portuguese singer
- Rita Guerrero (1964–2011), Mexican artist
- Rita Hosking (born 1969), American singer-songwriter
- Rita Hunter (1933–2001), British operatic dramatic soprano
- Rita Indiana (born 1977), Dominican writer and singer-songwriter
- Rita Johns, Canadian pop and rhythm and blues singer
- Rita Kapfhammer, German opera, operetta, concert and Lieder mezzo-soprano
- Rita Kassabian, Armenian composer
- Rita Keane (1922–2009), Irish singer and accordionist
- Rita Kinka (born 1962), Serbian pianist
- Rita Lawrence (1911–2001), British pianist and singer
- Rita Lee (1947–2023), Brazilian musician
- Rita Lynch, English singer-songwriter
- Rita MacNeil (1944–2013), Canadian country and folk singer
- Rita Marcotulli (born 1959), Italian jazz pianist and composer
- Rita Marley (born 1946), Jamaican singer and widow of Bob Marley
- Rita Mills (1935–2004), Australian musical artist
- Rita Montaner (1900–1958), Cuban musician
- Rita Montero (1927–2013), Argentine musical artist
- Rita Moss (1918–2015), American jazz musician
- Rita Ora (born 1990), British singer-songwriter
- Rita Orlandi-Malaspina (1937–2017), Italian operatic soprano
- Rita Pavone (born 1945), Italian singer
- Rita Payés (born 1999), Spanish jazz musician
- Rita Porfiris (born 1969), American violinist and arranger
- Rita Redshoes (born 1981), Portuguese singer-songwriter
- Rita Reys (1924–2013), Dutch jazz singer
- Rita Rose (born 1947), Indian singer and actress
- Rita Sakellariou (1934–1999), Greek singer
- Rita Shane (1936–2014), American soprano
- Rita Simons (born 1977), English actress and singer
- Rita Springer (born 1967), American Christian musician
- Rita Steblin (1951–2019), Canadian musicologist
- Rita Streich (1920–1987), operatic soprano
- Rita Strohl (1865–1941), French musical artist
- Rita Thyagarajan (born 1984), Indian singer
- Rita Vidaurri (1924–2019), American rehabs singer
- Rita Wolfensberger (1928–2020), Swiss classical pianist

=== In visual arts ===
- Rita Ackermann (born 1968), Hungarian-American artist
- Rita Angus (1908–1970), New Zealand painter
- Rita Asfour (1933–2021), American modern artist
- Rita Blitt (born 1931), American artist
- Rita Boley Bolaffio (1898–1995), Italian artist
- Rita Briansky (1925–2025), Canadian painter
- Rita Carvalho, Portuguese artist
- Rita Deanin Abbey, American artist and educator
- Rita Donagh (born 1939), British artist
- Rita Duffy, Northern Ireland artist
- Rita Genet, American-born artist
- Rita Grosse-Ruyken (born 1948), German artist
- Rita Keegan, American-British artist and archivist
- Rita Kernn-Larsen (1904–1998), Danish surrealist painter
- Rita Kersting, German art historian and curator
- Rita Letendre (1928–2021), Canadian artist
- Rita Longa (1912–2000), Cuban sculptor
- Rita McBride (born 1960), American artist and sculptor
- Rita McKeough, Canadian interdisciplinary artist
- Rita Mount (1885–1967), Canadian painter
- Rita Myers, American artist
- Rita Phillips, British sculptor and artist
- Rita Rohlfing, German painter, photographer and installation artist
- Rita Winkler (artist), Canadian artist

=== Fictional characters ===
- Rita Bennett, in the TV series Dexter and the novels by Jeff Lindsay on which the series is based
- Rita Desjardin, from the book Carrie
- Rita Repulsa, a villain in the TV series Mighty Morphin Power Rangers
- Rita Skeeter, in the Harry Potter franchise
- Rita Stapleton, in the TV series The Guiding Light
- Rita Sullivan, in the British soap opera Coronation Street
- Rita or Susan White, in Educating Rita
- "Lovely Rita," in The Beatles song Lovely Rita on their 1967 album, Sgt. Pepper's Lonely Hearts Club Band

== In government and politics ==
- Rita of Armenia (1278–1333), Empress of Byzantium
- Rita Agbo Ayim, Nigerian politician
- Rita Albrecht, public servant
- Rita Ali, mayor of Peoria, Illinois
- Rita Allison (born 1940), American politician
- Rita Aragon (born 1947), United States Air Force general
- Rita Atukwasa, Ugandan politician
- Rita Bahuguna Joshi (born 1949), Indian politician and member of parliament
- Rita Baranwal, Assistant Secretary of Energy for Nuclear Energy, USA
- Rita Barberá (1948–2016), Spanish politician and mayor of Valencia
- Rita Bellens (born 1962), Belgian politician
- Rita Benson LeBlanc (born 1977), former Vice Chairman of the Board of the New Orleans Saints
- Rita Bernardini (born 1952), Italian politician
- Rita Borsellino (1945–2018), Italian politician
- Rita Bosaho (born 1965), Spanish politician
- Rita Camata (born 1961), Brazilian politician
- Rita Campbell, American politician
- Rita dalla Chiesa (born 1947), Italian politician
- Rita Choudhary, Indian politician
- Rita Clark (1915–2008), American politician
- Rita Crocker Clements (1931–2018), First Lady of Texas
- Rita Crundwell (born 1953), American city comptroller convicted of fraud
- Rita C. Davidson (1928–1984), American judge
- Rita De Bont (born 1954), Belgian politician
- Rita Derrick Hayes, American politician
- Rita Dionne-Marsolais (born 1947), Canadian politician
- Rita Donaghy, Baroness Donaghy (born 1944), labor politician and life peer
- Rita Ellis (politician), first woman mayor of Delray Beach, Florida
- Rita María Esquivel Reyes (born 1946), Mexican politician
- Rita Fan (born 1945), Hong Kong politician
- Rita Fleming, American politician
- Rita Fromm (politician) (born 1944), German politician
- Rita Garman (born 1943), American judge
- Rita Hagl-Kehl (born 1970), German politician
- Rita Harris (politician), American politician and activist
- Rita Hart (born 1956), American politician
- Rita Haugerud (1919–2014), Norwegian politician
- Rita Hauser (born 1934), American lawyer
- Rita Heard Days (born 1950), American politician
- Rita Incerti (born 1961), Australian judge
- Rita Inos (1954–2009), Northern Mariana politician
- Rita Johnston (born 1935), Canadian politician
- Rita Joseph, American politician and educator
- Rita Júdice, Portuguese lawyer and politician
- Rita Kieber-Beck (born 1958), Deputy Prime Minister of Lichtenstein from 2001 to 2005
- Rita Korankye Ankrah (born 1962), Ghanaian counselor and minister
- Rita Lau (born 1953), retired Hong Kong senior government official
- Rita Lavelle, American political official and consultant
- Rita Law, Maltese politician
- Rita F. Lin (born 1978), American judge
- Rita Madeira, Portuguese politician
- Rita Maestre (born 1988), Spanish politician
- Rita Marko (1920–2018), Albanian politician
- Rita Martinson (born 1937), American politician
- Rita Matias, Portuguese politician
- Rita Mattson, American politician
- Rita Mayfield, American politician
- Rita Mendes, American state legislator
- Rita Meyer, American politician
- Rita D. Millar, American politician
- Rita Montagnana (1895–1979), Italian politician
- Rita Naa Odoley Sowah, Ghanaian politician
- Rita O'Hare (died 2023), Northern Irish politician
- Rita Ottervik (born 1966), Norwegian politician
- Rita Potts Parks (born 1962), American politician
- Rita Rae, Lady Rae (born 1950), Scottish judge
- Rita Rato (born 1983), Portuguese politician
- Rita H. Roaldsen (born 1956), Norwegian politician
- Rita Saffioti (born 1972), Australian politician
- Rita Sahu (born 1971), Indian politician
- Rita Sanders, American politician
- Rita Sargsyan (1962–2020), First Lady of Armenia
- Rita Sarimah Patrick Insol, Malaysian politician
- Rita Schwarzelühr-Sutter (born 1962), German politician
- Rita Sinon (1943–1989), Kenya-born Seychellois politician
- Rita Skjærvik (born 1974), Norwegian politician
- Rita Sletner, Norwegian politician
- Rita Smart (born 1948), American politician
- Rita Süssmuth (1937–2026), German politician
- Rita Tamašunienė (born 1973), Lithuanian politician
- Rita Tani Iddi (born 1949), Ghanaian politician
- Rita Tarai, Indian politician
- Rita Tveiten (born 1954), Norwegian politician
- Rita Valenti, American politician
- Rita Verdonk (born 1955), Dutch politician
- Rita Verma (born 1953), Indian politician
- Rita Walters (1930–2020), American politician

== In sport ==
- Rita Achkina (born 1938), Belarusian cross-country skier
- Rita Akaffou (born 1986), Ivorian professional footballer
- Rita Akarekor (born 2001), Nigerian footballer
- Rita Atik (born 1997), Moroccan tennis player
- Rita Behrend, East German canoeist
- Rita Bentley (1931–2016), British tennis player
- Rita Blankenburg (born 1942), German speed skater
- Rita Bludau (born 1942), German rower
- Rita Blumenberg (born 1936), German figure skater
- Rita Borbás (born 1980), Hungarian handball player
- Rita Borók, Hungarian handball player
- Rita Borralho (born 1954), Portuguese long-distance runner
- Rita Bottiglieri (born 1953), Italian sprinter and pentathlete
- Rita Bove, Brazilian footballer
- Rita Briggs (1929–1994), American baseball player
- Rita Chatterton, American professional wrestling referee
- Rita Chikwelu (born 1988), Nigerian footballer
- Rita Corrigan, American baseball player
- Rita Crockett (born 1957), American volleyball player
- Rita Czech-Blasl (1932–2023), German cross-country skier
- Rita Dal Monte (born 1961), Italian wheelchair curler and Paralympic
- Rita Davar (born 1935), Indian tennis player
- Rita Debbarma (born 1995), Indian cricketer
- Rita Defauw (born 1963), Belgian rower
- Rita Deli (born 1972), Hungarian handball player
- Rita Dey, Indian cricketer
- Rita Drávucz (born 1980), Hungarian water polo player
- Rita Easterling, American basketball player
- Rita Fatialofa-Paloto, New Zealand netball and softball player
- Rita Ferdinand (born 1995), Nigerian para powerlifter
- Rita Fontemanha (born 1993), Portuguese footballer
- Rita Gani (born 1977), Malaysian association football referee
- Rita Garay (born 1971), Puerto Rican swimmer
- Rita Gildemeister (born 1947), German high jumper
- Rita Good (born 1951), Swiss alpine skier
- Rita Gramignani (born 1943), Italian chess player
- Rita Grande (born 1975), Italian tennis player
- Rita Grigorian (born 2000), American-Armenian footballer
- Rita Guarino (born 1971), Italian footballer and manager
- Rita Hendricks (born 1956), U.S.V.I. sprinter
- Rita Hernández (born 1969), Spanish handball player
- Rita Holmes, English snooker player and dancing teacher
- Rita Horky (1937–1987), American basketball player and coach
- Rita Hrbacek, Austrian ice hockey administrator
- Rita Ináncsi (born 1971), Hungarian heptathlete
- Rita Jarvis, British tennis player
- Rita Jeptoo (born 1981), Kenyan marathon runner
- Rita Jones, Welsh lawn and indoor bowler
- Rita de Jong (born 1965), Dutch rower
- Rita Kas (born 1956), Hungarian and German chess player
- Rita Keller (1933–2005), American baseball player
- Rita Keszthelyi (born 1991), Hungarian water polo player
- Rita Kirst (born 1950), German high jumper
- Rita Kőbán (born 1965), Hungarian canoeist
- Rita König (born 1977), German fencer
- Rita Köster (born 1960), German handball Kogler
- Rita Kovács (born 1970), Hungarian swimmer
- Rita Kuti-Kis (born 1978), Hungarian tennis player
- Rita Lakatos (born 1999), Hungarian handball player
- Rita Larsen (born 1935), Danish swimmer
- Rita Leite (born 1997), Luxembourgish footballer
- Rita Liliom (born 1986), Hungarian volleyball player
- Rita de Luna (1929–1996), Guatemalan equestrian
- Rita Marchisio (born 1950), Italian long-distance runner
- Rita Mažukelytė (born 1985), Lithuanian footballer
- Rita Medrano (born 1990), Mexican swimmer
- Rita Méry (born 1984), Hungarian footballer
- Rita Meyer (baseball) (1927–1992), American baseball player
- Rita Musamali (born 1999), Ugandan cricketer
- Rita Nemes (born 1989), Hungarian athlete
- Rita Nwadike (born 1974), Nigerian footballer
- Rita Oraá (born 1963), Spanish volleyball player
- Rita Patel (born 1970), Indian cricketer
- Rita Peri (born 1957), Italian gymnast
- Rita Pfister (born 1952), Swiss discus thrower
- Rita Pichardo (born 1970), Cuban professional tennis player
- Rita Pogosova (died 1948), Soviet table tennis player
- Rita Pulido (born 1945), Spanish swimmer
- Rita Ramanauskaitė (born 1970), Lithuanian javelin thrower
- Rita Razmaitė (born 1967), Lithuanian cyclist
- Rita Récsei (born 1996), Hungarian race walker
- Rita Ridley (1946–2013), English runner
- Rita Sanz-Agero (born 1991), Guatemalan modern pentathlete
- Rita Saraiva, Congolese handball player
- Rita Schönenberger (born 1962), Swiss heptathlete
- Rita Schumacher (born 1937), German swimmer
- Rita Scott, Jamaican cricketer
- Rita Seamon, American bridge player
- Rita Sen, Indian sprinter
- Rita Shugart, American bridge player
- Rita Tamašauskaitė (born 1941), Lithuanian rower
- Rita Teixeira (born 1960), Brazilian volleyball player
- Rita Thijs (born 1958), Belgian sprinter
- Rita Todorova (born 1958), Bulgarian rower
- Rita Tower (born 1971), American soccer player
- Rita Trapanese (1951–2000), Italian figure skater
- Rita Van De Velde (born 1941), Belgian gymnast
- Rita Varnienė (born 1973), Lithuanian chess player
- Rita Vilaça (born 1993), Portuguese tennis player
- Rita Vittadini (1914–2000), Italian athlete
- Rita Wilden (born 1947), German sprinter
- Rita Williams (born 1976), American basketball player
- Rita Williams (footballer) (born 1979), Namibian footballer
- Rita Windbrake (born 1945), German athlete
- Rita Yeboah (born 1976), Ghanaian footballer
- Rita Zeqiri (born 1995), Kosovan swimmer

== In other fields ==
- Rita of Cascia (1381–1457), Italian Augustinian saint
- Rita Aciro, Ugandan activist
- Rita de Acosta Lydig (1875–1929), American socialite
- Rita Akosua Dickson (born 1970), Ghanaian chemist
- Rita Akpan (born 1944), Nigerian teacher
- Rita Almeida, Portuguese economist
- Rita Arditti (1934–2009), Argentine biologist, educator, activist and writer
- Rita Arnould, member of the Red Orchestra resistance group
- Rita Onoigboria, Nigerian Doctor
- Rita Atria (1974–1992), Italian anti-Mafia witness
- Rita Baga (born 1987), Canadian drag queen from Québec
- Rita Bake (born 1952), German economic of social historian
- Rita Barcelo y Pages (1843–1904), Spanish religious sister
- Rita Pitka Blumenstein (1936–2021), Alaska Native healer
- Rita Brara Mukhopadhyay, Indian sociologist
- Rita Nakashima Brock (born 1950), American scholar and Protestant theologian
- Rita Brunetti (1890–1942), Italian physicist
- Rita Burak (born 1946), Canadian civil servant
- Rita Buxton (1896–1982), Australian community worker, activist, racehorse owner and philanthropist
- Rita Calvo Sanz (born 1960), Spanish Roman Catholic nun
- Rita Carmo, Portuguese photographer
- Rita Casadio, professor of biochemistry
- Rita Cetina Gutiérrez (1846–1908), Mexican teacher, poet and feminist
- Rita Charon, American physician
- Rita Childers (1915–2010), Irish press attaché, wife of President Erskine Childers
- Rita R. Colwell (born 1934), environmental microbiologist
- Rita Nealon Cooley (1919–2006), American political scientist
- Rita Cornforth (1915–2012), Australian-British biochemist
- Rita Cucchiara (born 1965), Italian electrical and computer engineer
- Rita Deverell (born 1945), Canadian TV broadcaster and social activist
- Rita van Driel (born 1961), Dutch Paralympic board executive
- Rita El Khayat, Moroccan physician and writer
- Rita Elissaiou Komodiki, Greek Cypriot physician and politician
- Rita Fahy, Irish American expert in evacuation modeling and human behavior in fire
- Rita Famos (born 1966), Swiss theologian
- Rita Felski, American academic
- Rita Fernández Queimadelos (1911–2008), Spanish architect
- Rita Ferro (diplomat) (born 1953), Portuguese diplomat
- Rita Gardner (geographer) (born 1955), British geographer and academic
- Rita Geier, American civil rights activist
- Rita Gerle, American textile worker
- Rita Giacaman (born 1950), Palestinian public health professor
- Rita Gluzman, Ukrainian-born activist and murderer
- Rita K. Gollin (1928–2022), American literature scholar
- Rita Gonzalez, American curator, writer and media artist
- Rita Goold, British psychic and spiritualist medium
- Rita Goulet, American racing driver and police sergeant
- Rita Gross (1943–2015), American Buddhist feminist scholar
- Rita Gunther McGrath (born 1959), American strategic management scholar
- Rita Habib, Iraqi Assyrian woman and victim of ISIL persecution
- Rita May Wilson Harris (1888–1975), Australian community worker
- Rita Hazan (born 1974), American hair colorist
- Rita Hinden (1909–1971), South African social democratic activist
- Rita Horvath, Hungarian neurologist and researcher
- Rita Houston (1961–2020), American radio broadcaster
- Rita Huggins (1922–1996), Australian indigenous activist
- Rita Humphries-Lewin, Jamaican stockbroker and businesswoman
- Rita Izsák-Ndiaye, Hungarian diplomat
- Rita Jackson Samuels (1945–2018), American women's and civil rights activist
- Rita Jaima Paru, Papuan New Guinean food entrepreneur
- Rita Jenrette (born 1949), former wife of U.S. Representative John Jenrette
- Rita Jordan, autism researcher
- Rita Katz, anti-terrorism activist
- Rita Kavashe, Kenyan businesswoman and corporate executive
- Rita Klímová (1931–1993), Czech diplomat and economist
- Rita Kogler Carver (born 1963), American lighting designer, artist director and teacher
- Rita Krishnamurthi, New Zealand epidemiologist
- Rita Lakin (1930–2023), American dramatist
- Rita Leistner, Canadian cinematographer and photographer
- Rita Lejeune (1906–2009), Belgian philologist
- Rita Lenihan (1914–1989), United States Navy officer
- Rita G. Lerner, American physicist and librarian
- Rita Levi-Montalcini (1909–2012), Italian-American neurologist
- Rita Lobato (1866–1954), Brazilian physician
- Rita Lopes de Almeida (1848–1913), Portuguese nun
- Rita López de Llergo y Seoane (1904–1979), Mexican geographer
- Rita Mae Kelly (1939–2001), American political scientist
- Rita Mahato, Nepali women's rights activist
- Rita Maiburg (1952–1977), German aviator
- Rita Giuliana Mannella, Italian diplomat
- Rita Manzini, linguist
- Rita Marcalo, Portuguese dancer, choreographer and artistic director
- Rita Martin (1875–1958), English photographer
- Rita Martinez (1955–2020), American activist
- Rita McGhee (born 1964), American costume designer for film and television
- Rita Menu, New Zealand drag performer
- Rita Miljo (1931–2012), South African conservationist
- Rita Nasirumbi, Ugandan commercial pilot
- Rita Ndzanga (1933–2022), South African activist
- Rita Ng, American beauty pageant titleholder and cardiologist
- Rita Nieves, American public health administrator
- Rita Nyampinga, Zimbabwean women prisoner campaigner
- Rita Orji, Nigerian computer scientist
- Rita Ostrovskaya, Ukrainian photographer
- Rita Panahi (born 1976), Australian columnist and commentator
- Rita Panicker, Indian social worker and writer
- Rita Jaima Paru, Papua New Guinean food entrepreneur
- Rita Paulsen (born 1977), Tanzanian TV personality
- Rita Pérez de Moreno (1779–1861), Mexican insurgent and war heroine
- Rita Rapp (1928–1989), American physiologist
- Rita F. Redberg, American cardiologist
- Rita Reed, American photojournalist and professor
- Rita Richey, professor of instructional design
- Rita Riggs (1930–2017), American costume designer
- Rita Ryack, American costume designer
- Rita M. Sambruna, Italian astrophysicist
- Rita Sanchez (born 1937), American Chicano studies academic
- Rita Sangalli (1849–1909), Italian ballet dancer
- Rita Sapiro Finkler (1888–1968), Ukrainian-American physician
- Rita Schober (1918–2012), German scholar of Romance studies and literature
- Rita Schwerner Bender, civil rights activist and lawyer
- Rita Laura Segato (born 1951), Argentine-Brazilian academic
- Rita Smith (1912–1993), New Zealand communist and political activist
- Rita Smith-Wade-El (1948–2018), American sociologist
- Rita Stang (1894–1978), Australian public health doctor
- Rita Stephen (1925–2020), British trade unionist
- Rita Subowo, Indonesian sport executive
- Rita Taketsuru (1896–1961), Scottish-Japanese businesswoman
- Rita Tateel (born c. 1951), American businesswoman
- Rita Lizzi Testa, Italian late antique historian
- Rita Tewari, molecular parasitologist
- Rita Thomson (1934–2019), Scottish nurse
- Rita Vinieris (born 1964), Canadian fashion designer
- Rita Winkler, Canadian hydrologist
- Rita P. Wright (born 1936), American anthropologist
- Rita Zemach (1926–2015), American statistician
- Rita Zucca (1912–1998), World War II propagandist

== Animals ==
- Rita (chimpanzee)

== Disambiguation ==
- Rita Cadillac, multiple people
- Rita Johnson (disambiguation), multiple people
- Rita Pereira, multiple people
- Rita Schmidt, multiple people
- Rita Wright, multiple people
