= Mark Steines =

American broadcast journalist and actor (born 1964)

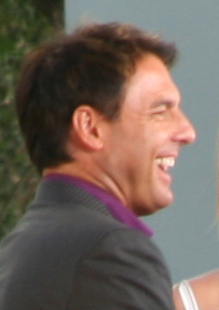
- Steines in 2007
- Born: Mark Anthony Steines; June 7, 1964 (age 62); Dubuque, Iowa, U.S.
- Education: University of Northern Iowa
- Occupations: Journalist/Anchor, Actor
- Years active: 1995–present
- Height: 6 ft (183 cm)
- Spouses: Leanza Cornett (m. 1995; div. 2013) Julie Freyermuth (m. 2016)
- Children: 3

Mark Anthony Steines (born June 7, 1964) is an American broadcast journalist and actor who was host of the syndicated gossip and entertainment round-up program Entertainment Tonight from 2004 to 2012, joining the program on August 24, 1995. He left the show on July 27, 2012. From 2012 to 2018, he co-hosted Hallmark Channel's Home and Family.

== Personal life ==
Steines was born in Dubuque, Iowa, one of two sons of LeRoy J. Steines (1929–2013) & Elizabeth J. "Betty" (née-Thomas; 1935–2020). He graduated from Hempstead High School in Dubuque, Iowa, class of 1982. He then went to the University of Northern Iowa in Cedar Falls, Iowa, on a football scholarship, graduating with a B.A. in radio and television.

Steines has competed four times in the Toyota Pro/Celebrity Race at the Long Beach Grand Prix, the most recent being in 2013. According to records kept by the event's celebrity coordinator, The Celebrity Source, Gene Hackman and Caitlyn Jenner are the only celebrities who have competed more times than Steines in the 38-year history of the race.

He married former Entertainment Tonight correspondent and Miss America 1993, Leanza Cornett, on the island of Kauai on July 22, 1995. They have two sons, Kai Harper and Avery James. In January 2013 Steines and Cornett officially announced that they were seeking a divorce after 17 years of marriage.

On August 20, 2016, Mark married children's book author Julie Freyermuth in a surprise (to their guests) ceremony at his Los Angeles home. Steines met Freyermuth in August 2015 when she was a guest on his Hallmark TV show, Home and Family. They welcomed a daughter, Parker Rose, on July 28, 2017.

== Career ==
After graduation, Steines worked in the newsroom at KWWL-TV in Waterloo, Iowa, rising up the ranks to reporter and photographer. As a cameraman at the 1988 Republican National Convention, he was mistaken for Tom Cruise and ended up on Entertainment Tonight. He then moved on to KSPR in Springfield, Missouri, where he was the sports anchor until 1991. His career led him to KCAL-TV in Los Angeles, California, and ESPN assignments. Steines was awarded two Emmys and a Golden Mike Award for work he did on KCAL specials.

In addition to his work as a broadcast journalist, Steines has done some acting. One of his roles was as a security guard in the movie Nixon (1995).

In 1995, he started as a correspondent and substitute anchor at Entertainment Tonight. Prior to being selected as co-host, Steines was also anchor of Entertainment Tonight Weekend and primary substitute anchor. However, he resumed co-hosting ET Weekend on a regular basis in mid-September 2010. In May, 2011, longtime co-anchor Mary Hart left the show and Steines took over as the main anchor. However, on March 24, 2012, it was announced that Steines had decided to leave ET at the end of his contract in order to pursue other opportunities. On July 27, 2012, Steines left ET after 17 years. His replacement was Rob Marciano. In 2006, he was a guest in an episode of the sixth season of America's Next Top Model.

Steines was the host of AOL's online reality television show Gold Rush in Fall 2006 which was executive produced by Mark Burnett.

He moved on to host the new Hallmark Channel TV talk show titled Home & Family with Paige Davis, which premiered on October 1, 2012. In June 2018, Steines was let go from the series.

He took over as host of KTLA's coverage of the Tournament of Roses parade starting in 2017, replacing Bob Eubanks.

== Filmography ==
Year	Title	Role	Notes
1995	Nixon	White House Security	
1999	Suddenly Susan	Eric	
2002	The Practice	Reporter Jeffrey Rothberg	
2004	The Young and the Restless	Escort #1	
2005	Half & Half	Craig	
2006	CSI: NY	Entertainment Reporter	
2007	Handy Manny	Oscar	
2017	A Rose For Christmas	Himself	

Preceded by Mary Hart with Bob Goen	Hosts of Entertainment Tonight with Mary Hart; 2004–2011	Succeeded by Nancy O'Dell
Preceded by Mario Lopez	Host of Miss America; 2008	Succeeded by Mario Lopez
