= Gerle =

Gerle is a surname. Notable people with the name include:

- Adam Gerle, Canadian politician
- Andrew Gerle, American composer and pianist
- Christophe Antoine Gerle (1736–c. 1801), French revolutionist
- Elisabeth Gerle (born 1951), Swedish philosopher
- Hans Gerle (c.1500–1570), German lutenist and arranger of the Renaissance
- Rita Gerle, 18th-century Spanish textile worker

== See also ==
- Bánhidi Gerle, Hungarian sport aircraft (1930–1939)
