= Rita Ferro =

Rita Ferro may refer to:

- Rita Ferro (diplomat)
- Rita Ferro (writer)
