= Rehberger =

Rehberger is a surname of German origin. Notable people with the surname include:

- Gustav Rehberger (1910–1995), Austrian-born American painter, draftsman, illustrator, designer, muralist, and art educator
- Milissa Rehberger (born 1971), American television journalist
- Tobias Rehberger (born 1966), German sculptor
