= Robert Mwesigwa =

Ugandan politician

Robert Mwesigwa Rukaari
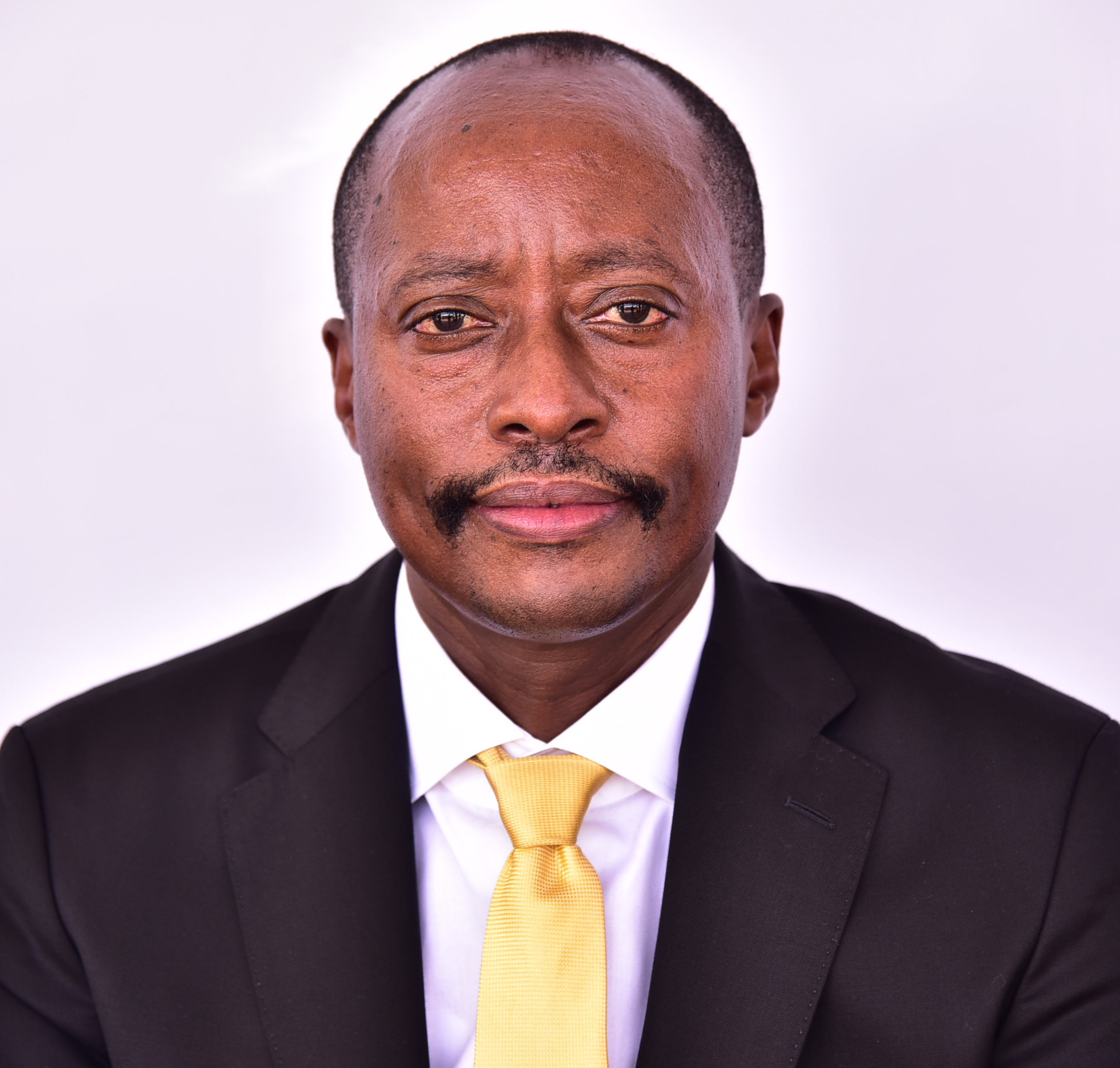

Parliament of Uganda
- Constituency: Mbarara City North

Personal details
- Party: National Resistance Movement
- Education: Makerere University
- Occupation: Politician

Robert Mwesigwa Rukaari is a Ugandan politician and former legislator representing Mbarara North, Mbarara City. He is the Chairman of the East African Procurement News Company Limited, a sister company of AMPROC INC which publishes a monthly magazine that reviews the procurement industry in the East African Region and has been the Honorary Consul for the Republic of Malawi in Uganda. He was also the Honorary Consul of the Kingdom of Morocco.

He also serves as a member of the Central Executive Committee of National Resistance Movement, the ruling party in Uganda.

== Education ==
- Makerere University – B.A. Political Science and French
- Makerere University – Master's degree in Public Administration
- Nkumba University – Master's in Security and Strategic Studies
- Nkumba University – Diploma Strategic Public Relations
- Nkumba University – Diploma in Business Administration and Management

== Political career ==
National Resistance Movement – National Chairman, Entrepreneurship League and Member of the Central Executive Committee National Resistance Movement (November 2015 – present).

In 2019, he was appointed a Chamber Leader to serve on the International Chamber of Commerce (ICC) World Chambers Federation (WCF) General Council from 2020 to 2022 in Paris, France, a world Business Organisation, enabling World Businesses to secure prosperity and opportunity for all people in the world. He was chairman, Board of Africa Strategic Leadership Centre, a collaborative initiative of leaders from public and private sectors, committed to Africa's progress, cultivating growth opportunities and investing in the continent's human capital.

In 2021, Members of Parliament of Uganda on the Statutory Authorities and State Enterprise (COSASE) committee squeezed him to show how he acquired three plots of land that belonged to Uganda Railway Co-operation the URC in Port Bell and Mulago at a total of Shs 357 million in 2009, which he failed to answer.

In the NRM primary elections, he ran with his longtime ally Tusiime Michael, whom he had supported in the previous election. He lost his MP seat to Christopher Bakashaba.

== Controversies ==
In December 2021, a family in Isingiro district petitioned the government after losing over ten billion Shillings to Robert Mwesigwa Rukaari, after their own land in Isingiro District was occupied by refugees and when the government compensated them he refused to pay their money which he convinced to pass on to his company bank account.

During the COVID-19 era, he was accused of manufacturing fake face masks that were not approved by the Uganda National Bureau of Standards, which he had opened its factory in Mbarara.

== See also ==
- Rita Atukwasa
- Mwiine Mpaka
- Anita Among
- Thomas Tayebwa
