= David Francis Pocock =

British anthropologist

David Francis Pocock (3 September 1928 – 25 November 2007) was a British anthropologist whose main field of study was the people and diaspora of the Indian state of Gujarat, and in particular the Patidar community of that state.

David Pocock was born on 3 September 1928 in London. After early education at Highbury School, he attended Pembroke College, Cambridge, where he studied English Literature under F. R. Leavis. During the 1950s, he moved to the University of Oxford to take a PhD in anthropology under the guidance of Edward Evans-Pritchard. It was at this time that he began to translate the works of Emile Durkheim and he also conducted fieldwork in Gujarat, as well as among the Indian diaspora in East Africa and London.

Pocock moved to a post as reader at the University of Sussex in 1966, having become disenchanted with life in Oxford. Sussex provided a more relaxed social environment and was at the time a centre of challenging intellectual ideas. The Guardian describes how, at Sussex, "He soon developed a wide range of friendships and famously celebrated his 40th birthday with a legendary "black party", draping the house in crepe and serving only black velvet and caviar, both in copious quantities."

A personal chair was awarded to Pocock by Sussex in 1977. While there, he was influential in the foundation of the School of African and Asian Studies and also in rescuing the archives of Mass Observation. He was an inspirational teacher but became tired of changes occurring in the university system and retired early, in 1987. Although he then gave up formal study, he remained an intellectually rigorous and curious person. In particular, The Guardian notes, "... forgoing his long and intense association with Roman Catholicism, he looked to a deeper involvement in the mystery of human consciousness through his investigations of Buddhism". He also became a prison visitor.

Pocock died on 25 November 2007. He had been awarded the Rivers Memorial Medal by the Royal Anthropological Institute of Great Britain and Ireland in 1974.

== Works ==
Louis Dumont was among the influential social anthropologists that Pocock met while at Oxford. As well as taking over Dumont's lectureship in Indian sociology while at that university, Pocock joined with Dumont to found Contributions to Indian Sociology, an academic journal. in 1957. The pair worked together on this for five years.

Much of his work remains unpublished, despite being influential and despite the existence of a lengthy bibliography. Among his published writings were:

- Pocock, David Francis (1972). Kanbi and Patidar: a study of the Patidar community of Gujarat. Clarendon Press. ISBN 978-0-19-823175-2.
- Pocock, David Francis (1973). Mind, Body and Wealth: A Study of Belief and Practice in an Indian Village. John Wiley & Sons. ISBN 9780631150008.
- Pocock, David (1975). Understanding Social Anthropology. Hodder & Stoughton.
