= Contributions to Indian Sociology =

- Discipline: Sociology
- Language: English
- Edited by: Rita Brara Mukhopadhyay

Publication details
- History: 1957–present
- Publisher: Sage Publishing
- Frequency: Triannually
- Impact factor: 0.8 (2023)

Standard abbreviations
- ISO 4: Contrib. Indian Sociol.

Indexing
- ISSN: 0069-9667 (print); 0973-0648 (web)
- LCCN: 64032324
- JSTOR: 0069-9667
- OCLC no.: 692933415

Links
- Journal homepage; Online access; Online archive

Contributions to Indian Sociology is a triannual peer-reviewed academic journal covering sociology with an emphasis on South Asian societies and cultures. It was established in 1957 by Louis Dumont and David Francis Pocock. It is published by Sage Publishing in association with the Institute of Economic Growth. The journal ceased publication in 1966. A new series commenced publication the next year at the initiative of Triloki Nath Madan, with volume numbering re-starting at 1. Published annually till 1974, it became a biannual publication in 1975. From 1999, it has been published thrice a year.

The editor-in-chief is Rita Brara Mukhopadhyay (Institute of Economic Growth).

== Abstracting and indexing ==
The journal is abstracted and indexed in:

- Anthropological Literature
- Current Contents/Social and Behavioral Sciences
- EBSCO databases
- FRANCIS
- Index Islamicus
- ProQuest databases
- Scopus
- Social Sciences Citation Index
- Sociological Abstracts

According to the Journal Citation Reports, the journal has a 2023 impact factor of 0.8.
