= Rita Kogler Carver =

American lighting designer, artist, director and teacher

- Born: Rita Ann Kogler; January 7, 1963 (age 63); North Tonawanda, New York, U.S.
- Education: Cedar Crest College (BA); New York University (MFA)

Rita Kogler Carver (born Rita Ann Kogler on January 7, 1963) is an American lighting designer, artist, director and teacher.

== Education ==
Carver was born in North Tonawanda, New York, and graduated from Stroudsburg High School in Stroudsburg, Pennsylvania, in 1981.

She attended Cedar Crest College in Allentown, Pennsylvania, graduating in 1985 with a BA in theater. “I was dared to try out for a part in my sophomore year of college, and I got the part. When it came time for set building and technical design, and the builders asked if anyone knew how to use power tools or a screwdriver – because Cedar Crest was a women’s college at the time – so, I volunteered. My dad taught me how to do all that stuff. From then on, I always worked behind the scenes; I caught the theater bug pretty quickly,” she said of her time there.

Carver subsequently studied with Gustav Rehberger at the Art Students League of New York in New York City. She later attended graduate school in the Tisch School of Arts at New York University, graduating in 1989 with an MFA in lighting design.

== Career ==
After graduation from NYU, Carver began work in theater as a lighting designer, working on Broadway, Off-Broadway, and in regional theater, dance, and opera.

In 1996, she branched into television, gaining work on news shows and daytime dramas for ABC Television and a variety of shows for VH1 and the Food Network. She then expanded into talk shows, including The Montel Williams Show. She was part of the team that designed the NBC News studios for the 2000 Summer Olympics, for which she won an EMMY Award.

Carver has been teaching for over fifteen years, including at New York University, SUNY Fredonia, Dutchess Community College, and Westchester Community College. She has written articles for the trade magazines Lighting Dimensions and IEEE MultiMedia. She was one of the original moderators for a pro lighting forum on Creative Cow.

=== DragonFly Performing Arts Center ===
Carver moved to the Catskils to start Dragonfly Performing Arts, a non-profit organization in Cairo, New York for students interested in theater. "You can walk into a classroom in New York City and have any amount of students who want to learn about theater, but the trouble is that you find it in abundance. I like a challenge. I moved upstate and started DragonFly so that students who do not have the immediate opportunity to learn from Theater professionals like New York City students do, can learn from my past and my experiences. These students are thirsty for knowledge, and I am ready and willing to help them learn as much as they want," she has said. DragonFly has produced shows such as Cats, Glass Menagerie, Alice in Wonderland, A Christmas Carol, Phantom Tollbooth, Snoopy!, It's A Wonderful Life the Musical, A Midsummer Night Dream, and Lost in Yonkers. Classes are also offered throughout the year to students from ages eight and higher.

=== BearFly Designs ===
Since the early 1970s, "John and Rita Carver have worked separately and together in virtually every type of venue imaginable from outdoor theaters and barns to Broadway to major television networks." Started in 2003, BearFly Designs was and still is primarily rooted in weddings and parties, while also accommodating to government fundraisers and other political events.

=== Broadway and regional theater productions ===
| Year | Show |
|---|---|
| 1989 | Feld Ballet |
| 1990 | Hamlet (Theater for the Blind) |
| 1992 | Guys and Dolls |
| 1993 | The Sisters Rosenwig |
| 1994 | Rigoletto |
| 1994 | Julius Caesar |
| 1995 | Pointer Sisters Ain’t Misbehavin’ |
| 1996 | Elmer Gantry |
| 1996 | Once Upon a Mattress |
| 1996 | A Delicate Balance |
| 1997 | Paper Moon |
| 1997 | Titanic |
| 1997 | An American Daughter |
| 2008 | Ain’t Misbehavin’ National Tour with Ruben Stoddard |
| 2009 | Ain’t Misbehavin’ Amhanson Theater Production |

=== Television ===
| Year | Show |
|---|---|
| 1996–1999 | Discovery News |
| 1997–1999 | Good Morning America |
| 1998 | PrimeTime Live |
| 1998–1999 | Martha Stewart Living |
| 1998–1999 | Elmo's World |
| 1999–2006 | The Montel Williams Show |
| 1999 | ESPN Sports Century |
| 1999 | Saturday Night Fever – television spot commercial |

=== Design credits ===
Time Warner Building in Columbus Circle, Bloomberg World Headquarters, ABC/Disney Times Square Studios, National Geographic Society's Auditorium

=== Awards ===
| Year | Award |
|---|---|
| 1998 Elmo's World | Silver Axiem Award |
| 2000 Sydney Summer Olympics | Team Emmy for Lighting Design |
| 2003 The Montel Williams Show | Emmy Nomination |
| 2003 The Montel Williams Show | Silver Axiem Award |

== Personal life ==
Carver is the daughter of Albert H. Kogler, Jr. and Rita LoVerme Kogler. She grew up in North Tonawanda, New York, spent one year in Scranton, Pennsylvania, and then moved to Willingboro, New Jersey and then to Stroudsburg, Pennsylvania.

Carver lived in New York City for almost twenty years after graduate school. After the September 11 attacks, she relocated to Tarrytown, New York and then Poughkeepsie, New York. She was a member of United Scenic Artists Local 829 and NABET Local 16, the Illuminating Engineering Society, and the International Association of Lighting Designers.

From 1992 to 2002, she was married to George Allison. On September 18, 2004, Rita married John Carver. They currently reside in New Lebanon, NY.
