= Rita Schmidt =

Rita Schmidt may refer to:

- Rita Blankenburg, (Schmidt) (born 1942), retired German speed skater
- Rita Schmidt (rower) (born 1942), retired German rower
- Rita Kirst (née Schmidt) (born 1950), retired German high jumper
