= Mwine Mpaka Rwamirama =

Ugandan politician (born 1988)

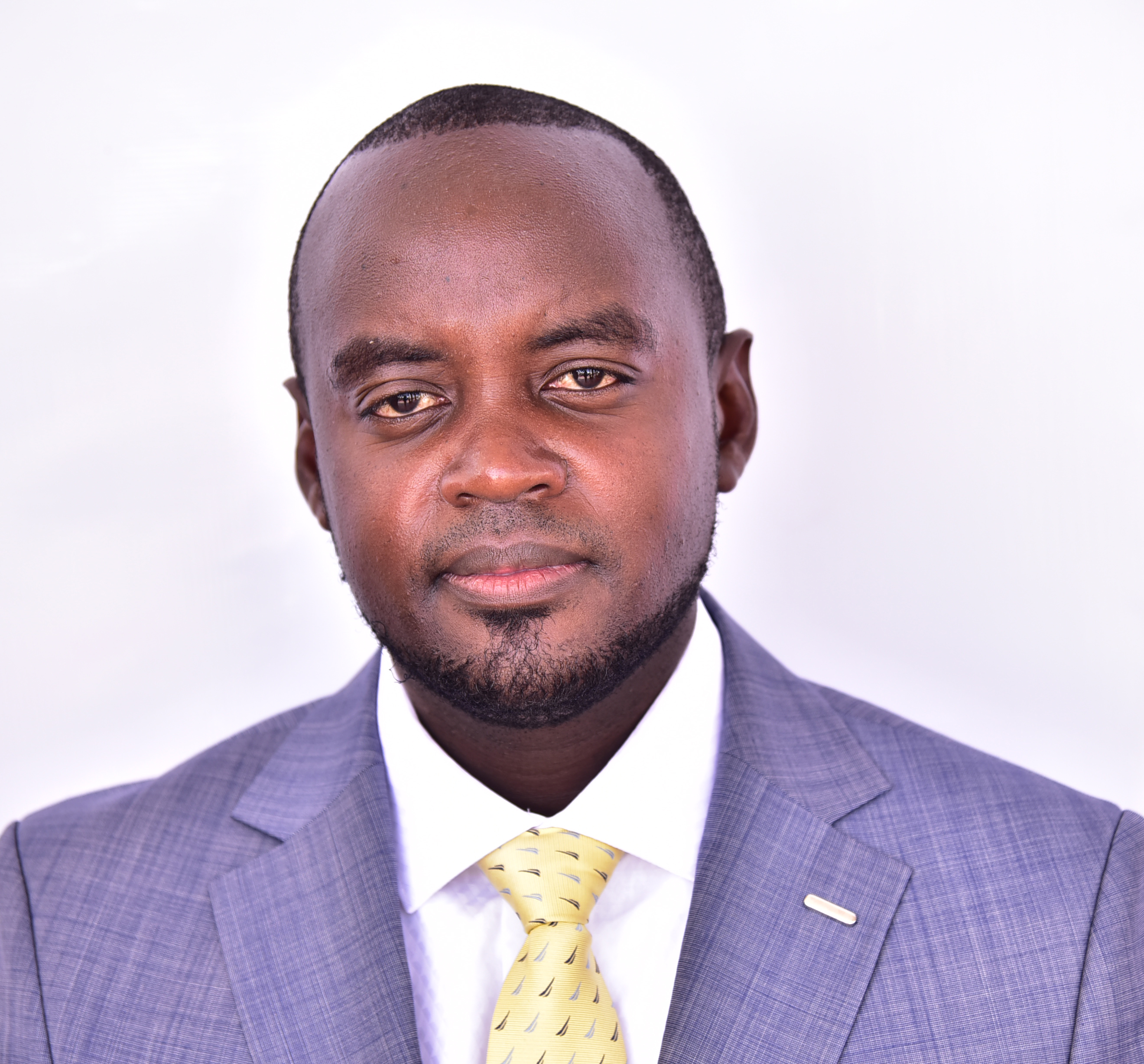
- Constituency: Mbarara City South

Personal details
- Born: 9 September 1988 (age 37) Uganda
- Party: National Resistance Movement
- Spouse: Isabelle Amanda Nankanda
- Parent: Bright Rwamirama
- Occupation: Politician and entrepreneur

Mwine Mpaka Rwamirama is a Ugandan politician, and legislator, representing Mbarara City South in the 12th parliament of Uganda.

He previously served as the Youths Representative for Western Region from 2016-2021 He is also the Director and Club President of Mbarara City FC in the western City of Mbarara.

== Early life and education ==
Mwine Rwamirama was born in Isingiro Uganda to the Veteran Minister Bright Rwamirama. In 1991, he went to Lohana Academy where he finished his primary level of Education (PLE), he then joined Vienna College, Namugongo for the Uganda Certificate of Education (UCE) in 2003. In 2005, he joined Green Hill Academy for his Uganda Advanced Certificate of Education (UACE), then to Uganda Martyrs University, for a Bachelor's degree of Science in information Technology, in 2009. In 2018, he joined ESLSCA University, France for a Master's degree in International Business.

On 3 August 2019, he officially became married to his fiancé Isabelle Amanda Nankanda. He also on the same day announced the 2021 bid for Mbarara City South Mp.

== Career ==
Mpaka is the Chairperson on the Committee of Trade Industry and tourism in the 11th Parliament, and is also on the budget committee of the 11th parliament.

However, he served on the 10th parliament on committee of Science and Technology and (Gender, Labour and Social development). He also proposed the establishment of the committee to scrutinize in the fund which was set up in March 2017 for consolidation in Saudi Arabia at Uganda's Embassy in Riyadh.

== Sim card hack ==
In February 2018, Rwamiramas' phone SIM cards were allegedly hacked by two employees of MTN Uganda, a large telecommunications company. The two then defrauded people using his telephone lines at a time Rwamirama was in Australia on official duty. In this case the Bank of Uganda and Uganda Communications Commission were involved.

== See also ==
Rita Atukwasa

Robert Mwesigwa
