= Rita Mulcahy =

Author and public speaker (died 2010)

Rita Mulcahy (October 6, 1959 − May 15, 2010) was an author and public speaker in the Project Management field.

Mulcahy was the founder and CEO of RMC Project Management and an internationally recognized expert on project management techniques, advanced project management theory, risk management and the Project Management Professional Exam. She authored the book PMP Exam Prep, as well as over a dozen self-study resources. Mulcahy, through her company, trained thousands of project managers each year, in over 30 countries.

Mulcahy died on Saturday, May 15, 2010, from complications related to a five-year battle with inflammatory breast cancer (IBC). She was 50 years old.
