= Rita Sapiro Finkler =

Ukrainian-American physician (1888–1968)

- Born: Ricka Sapiro; November 1, 1888; Kherson
- Died: November 8, 1968 (aged 80); New York City
- Occupation: physician

Rita Sapiro Finkler (born Ricka Sapiro; November 1, 1888 – November 8, 1968) was a Russian-born American physician. She practiced pediatrics and gynecology in her early career, but is best known for her work as an endocrinologist. She established and directed the department of endocrinology at Newark Beth Israel Hospital in Newark, New Jersey.

== Early life ==
Ricka Sapiro was born in 1888 in Kherson, Taurida Governorate, Russian Empire to Sarah and Woolf Sapiro, a miller. Her mother, who came from a Jewish family, died from breast cancer when Ricka was young. She had two sisters, Saphira and Rhia, and a brother who died as a child. She attended Byra Bestow-Gersky College and enrolled at Saint Petersburg State University to study law when she was sixteen years old. She left the university after two years with the intention of moving to New Zealand. She made a stopover in the United States, where she passed through Pennsylvania to visit a relative who had graduated from the Woman's Medical College of Pennsylvania. Her relative persuaded her to remain in the US and attend the Woman's Medical College herself. While studying, she met Samuel J. Finkler; they married in 1913 and Sapiro graduated in 1915. Rita and Samuel Finkler had a daughter, Sylvia (born in 1921), and divorced in 1925.

== Medical career ==
After receiving her medical degree in 1915, Finkler completed her internship at Philadelphia Polyclinic, where she was the first female intern. Her position in the hospital was controversial among the other staff and the general public, and was covered in numerous newspaper articles. After her internship, Finkler worked for the Philadelphia Health Center, which she directed from 1916 to 1918. She then moved to Newark, New Jersey, and established a private practice there in 1919. She mainly practiced pediatrics and obstetrics and was particularly active in treating Newark's Italian population. In 1928, she undertook postgraduate research in endocrinology at Mount Sinai Hospital in New York City, and traveled to the University of Vienna in 1929 to continue her research. In Vienna, she worked with other researchers on trials of the pregnancy test developed by Selmar Aschheim and Bernhard Zondek. At some point in her early career, Finkler began using the name "Rita" rather than "Ricka" after having a job offer from Saint Vincent's Hospital in Manhattan retracted when her prospective employers discovered that she was a woman and that her name was not short for "Richard".

While practicing privately in Newark, Finkler also worked at Newark Beth Israel Hospital, first as a pediatrician and later as a gynecologist. In 1934, after publishing over 70 articles in endocrinology, she founded the hospital's department of endocrinology, which she directed from 1939 to 1951. She was especially interested in the integration of endocrinology and women's health and researched the hormonal disturbances involved in infertility, amenorrhea and ovarian dysfunction, as well as the treatment of menopause-related symptoms with synthetic estrogens. She also studied the fertility problems in women caused by malnutrition during the Second World War. After stepping down as the head of Newark Beth Israel's endocrinology department, Finkler served as a chief emeritus and consultant endocrinologist.

Finkler was an active member of the American Medical Women's Association (AMWA). She chaired its refugee committee from 1938 to 1948, helping displaced women physicians from Europe to settle and establish practices in the U.S. She was president of the AMWA New Jersey branch and was named by the branch as Medical Woman of the Year in 1956.

== Death ==
Finkler had a stroke in 1958. She recovered fully and continued practicing medicine but later developed heart failure, and died of a coronary occlusion in 1968 in New York City. She was survived by her daughter, Sylvia F. Becker, who was also a physician, along with three grandchildren. Her papers, including an unpublished autobiography titled Good Morning, Doctor!, are held by the Rutgers University Libraries.
