= Rita Agbo Ayim =

Nigerian politician

A member of the State House of Assembly in Cross River State

Personal details
- Born: born 1962
- Profession: Female politician

Rita Agbo Ayim (born 1962) is a Nigerian politician and People Democratic Party member from Ogoja local government in Cross River State.

== Political career ==
She previously was the chairman of the Ogoja local government area and commissioner of women affairs in the executive council of Cross River State under Governor Ben Ayade.

She is currently a member of the State House of Assembly in Cross River State.
