= Rita Marshall =

English journalist and editor (1934–2008)

Rita Marshall (1934–2008) was a journalist who became the first woman home news editor for The Times

She was born in South London, attending first Greycoat School and then the City of London College, where she gained the Royal Society of Arts' diploma in shorthand and typing. She started her career at the Stratford Express in 1954, and then moved to the Junior Express, where she multi-tasked as a reporter, feature writer, sub-editor and layout woman.

She has a half-brother named Robin Norman Marshall Clement (1941) who lives in North Carolina.

Her father, Jack Marshall, was a receptionist in the lobby at the Daily Express, who took the opportunity to speak to Lord Beaverbrook about taking her on as a journalist. This succeeded and in 1956 she moved to the paper where she worked for eleven years, before moving on to The Times. She was recruited to her new post as part of an attempt to liven up the paper. She was one of the first women reporters employed by the paper. In 1974 she was appointed Home News Editor, where she expanded the scope of reporting beyond politics and crime. In 1976 Charles Douglas-Home became home editor and Marshall was reassigned to special reports, firstly as an assistant editor and then as deputy editor from 1981.

During the eighties she became the partner of Pearce Wright, the science editor of The Times. After his death in 2005, Rita moved into Pickering House, Dorking (a nursing home run by the Journalists’ Charity) where she lived until her death in 2008.
