= Rita Habib =

Iraqi Christian woman

- Born: Iraq

Rita Habib (Arabic: ریتا حبیب) is an Iraqi Assyrian woman who was kidnapped and used as an ISIS sex slave in 2014. She lived in Qaraqosh, northern Iraq. Habib was captured in 2014 and sold into ISIS sex slavery. She was bought and sold four times, until the fifth men who bought her for £20,000, posing as jihadists, turned out to be the ones to rescue her. She had traveled to Turkey with her father in 2014 in an attempt to safeguard her father and her from ISIS who had taken over her hometown. However, on reaching home again, she was then kidnapped and taken as a slave. In 2017, she returned home after three years. Her memoirs were published and translated to different languages.

== See also ==
- Assassination of Benazir Bhutto
- Nadia Murad
