= Rita Oraá =

Spanish volleyball player (born 1963)

Personal information
- Full name: Rita Oraá Larrazabal
- Nationality: Spanish
- Born: July 27, 1963 (age 63); Vitoria-Gasteiz, Basque Country, Spain

Rita Oraá Larrazabal (born 27 July 1963) is a Spanish former volleyball player who competed in the 1992 Summer Olympics. She was born in the Basque city of Vitoria-Gasteiz, but she lived in the nearby village of Nanclares de la Oca during her whole childhood and adolescence.

Oraá was a member of the Spanish women's national volleyball team that took part in the 1992 Summer Olympics. The team got an Olympic Diploma (8th place). To this day, she is the only Basque volleyball player to have taken part in an Olympic Games.
