= Rita Cadillac =

Rita Cadillac may refer to:

- Rita Cadillac (French dancer) (1936–1995), French dancer, singer, and actress
- Rita Cadillac (Brazilian entertainer) (born 1954), Brazilian dancer and singer
