= Rita Atukwasa =

Ugandan politician

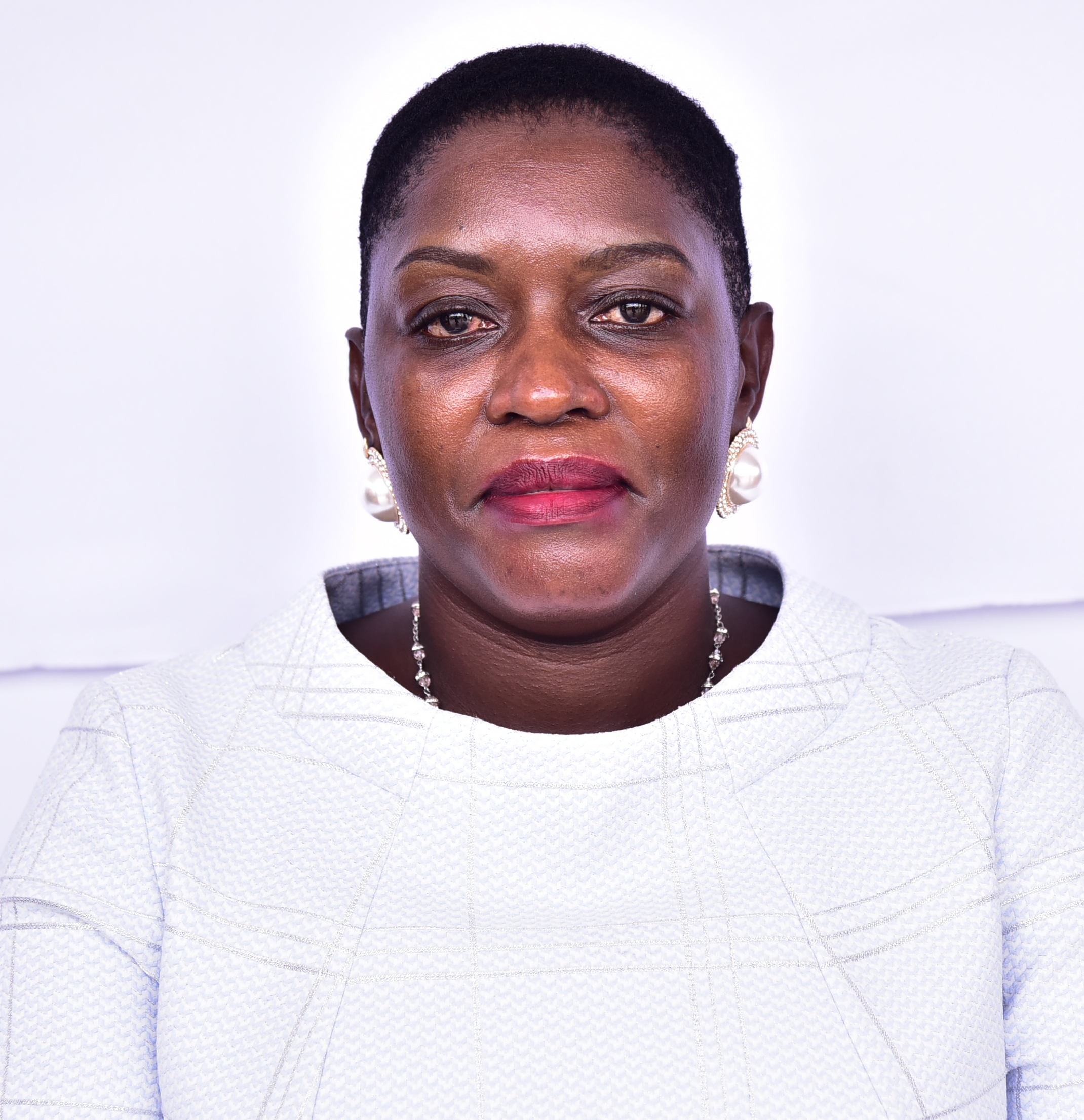
- Rita Atukwasa, Woman Member of Parliament Mbarara city
- Born: Mbarara District
- Education: Makerere University; Institute for Training for Transformation in South Africa
- Occupations: legislator, politician, Public Policy Analyst, Gender specialist and Trainer for Gender and Equity Budgeting
- Political party: Independent politician

Rita Atukwasa is a former Member of Parliament of Uganda in the Eleventh Parliament, Public Policy Analyst, Gender specialist and Trainer for Gender and Equity Budgeting. She is also a former Executive director at The Institute for Social Transformation (IST) Uganda. She is the Woman Member of Parliament of Mbarara district having won the January, 2021 as an independent candidate. Rita is also a member of the Gender Based Violence Prevention Network.

== Background and education ==
Rita Atukwasa has a degree in Social Administration and Political Science from Makerere University in 2001. She also attained a Post Graduate Diploma from Institute for Training for Transformation South Africa. She then did a Master's Degree in Public Policy and Governance from the Uganda Management Institute in 2016.

== Career ==
Rita Atukwasa served as the Program manager Advocacy human Rights for the Kamwokya Christian Caring Community from August 2004 to 2011. Rita then served as the CEO of the Uganda Women's Parliamentary Association of the Parliament Of Uganda up to July, 2012. She then served as a Policy Analyst for the Institute for Social Transformation from August 2012 to 2016 before becoming its Executive Director in 2016 to present. Ritah Atukwase is the woman member of Parliament for Mbarara city in the Eleventh Parliament of Uganda. She lost her MP seat after being defeated by Charity Kibaaju Kamuhanda who garnered 23,413 votes and Ritah garnering 22,526 votes in 2026 elections.

== See also ==
- List of members of the eleventh Parliament of Uganda
- Mwiine Mpaka
- Robert Mwesigwa
