= Rita Sanchez =

American Chicana/o studies academic

Rita Sanchez (born May 20, 1937 in San Bernardino, California) is an American academic in the field of Chicana/o studies.

Sanchez' family roots are in Bernalillo, New Mexico, but her grandfather took a second home in San Bernardino in 1910 because of his work with the Southern Pacific Railroad, and sold the Bernalillo home in 1919. Rita Sanchez was born in San Bernardino on May 20, 1937, the seventh of eleven children. She graduated from San Bernardino High School in 1956 and studied journalism at San Jose State University as one of the first Mexican-Americans to attend college, but did not finish her degree. She returned to college in the 1970s as a single mother of two daughters, earning a B.A. in English in 1972, a master's degree in education in 1973, and an M.A. in English in 1974, all from Stanford University. While at Stanford, she taught the first Chicana studies course there. She taught at San Diego State University from 1974 to 1984 while simultaneously doing graduate studies at the University of California, San Diego.

In 1977, she married her second husband, Mario Acevedo, and they had two more children. Leaving academia in 1984, Sanchez founded the Acevedo Gallery in San Diego with Acevedo and his father, artist Guillermo Acevedo. The gallery primarily showed works by Chicano artists, but also included art from Latin America and Native American art from the southwestern U.S.

Sanchez returned to teaching again in 1990, joining the faculty at San Diego Mesa College. At Mesa College, she chaired the Chicano Studies department from 1996 to 1999, and in 2006 she led the department to change its name to the department of Chicana and Chicano Studies. She married one of her academic collaborators, Richard Griswold del Castillo, in 2005.

Sanchez was inducted into the San Diego County Women's Hall of Fame in 2011 for her dedicated activism.
