= Rita Elissaiou Komodiki =

Greek Cypriot physician and politician

Rita Elissaiou Komodiki (Greek: Ρίτα Ελισσαίου Κωμοδίκη) is a Greek Cypriot physician and politician for Progressive Party of Working People and current mayoress (in exile) of the northern coastal city of Kyrenia (which is controlled by Northern Cyprus). Komodiki got a degree on Medicine from the National and Kapodistrian University of Athens and worked in several hospitals. During the 1974 war between Greek Cypriots and Turkish Cypriots she coordinated the attention of the wounded during the conflict. She was elected in the 2016 local elections and took office on 1 January 2017, being one of the four female elected mayoress in Cyprus.
