= Rita Dev =

Hindustani classical singer

Dr. Rita Dev
- Born: Assam
- Genres: Indian classical, Hindustani Classical, Natyageeta, Bhajan, Thumri, Tappa
- Occupation: Classical Singer
- Website: https://ritadev.com/index.html

Dr. Rita Dev is a Hindustani classical singer. She is a disciple of the Thumri vocalist Padma Vibhushan Vidhushi, Dr. Girija Devi.

Dev was born in Assam.

== Early life and education ==
Dev completed her primary education in classical music at an early age under the guidance of Guru Nirmal Acharya. After pursuing M.A. from Banaras Hindu University, she did her Doctorate in classical music under the guidance of Prof. Chittaranjan Jyotishi of Gwalior Gharana. She also got a golden opportunity of learning light classical music under the Legendary Vocalist of Banaras Gharana, Late. Pt. Mahadev Prasad Mishra.

== Career ==
Dev is Professor (vocal) and head of the department of music, associated with Agra College, Agra.

== Awards ==
Dev received several prestigious awards and honors including the Pt. Omkarnath Thakur Award, Swara Ratna, Sangeet Ratna and many more.
