= Rita Miljo =

South African conservationist

- Born: Rita Neumann; 18 February 1931; Heilsberg, East Prussia, Germany
- Died: 27 July 2012 (aged 81); Limpopo Province, South Africa
- Occupations: Animal rights activist and conservator

Rita Miljo (née Neumann; 18 February 1931 – 27 July 2012) was a German-born, South African conservationist and animal rights pioneer noted for founding and managing the "Centre for Animal Rehabilitation and Education" (CARE) near Phalaborwa in South Africa. Born in East Prussia shortly before World War II began, she had dreams from an early age of becoming a veterinarian. When the war broke out, she became involved in the girls' wing of the Hitler Youth, but quit when her father no longer supported the Nazis. After a brief stint studying psychology in university, she worked in a factory and then at the Hagenbeck Zoo.

When her fiance moved to Johannesburg, Neumann followed him there and they married. Initially, Miljo worked in an office, but spent her weekends studying animals in the Kruger National Park. She bought a 50-acre parcel of land in Limpopo Province on the banks of the Olifants River in 1963. In 1980, she rescued an orphaned female baboon and became determined to establish a wildlife sanctuary for animals on her property. In 1989, she founded CARE, and developed a system to rehabilitate injured and orphaned animals so that they could be reintroduced to the wild. Because of her lack of training, her work initially was viewed by scientists with scepticism, but she came to be regarded as an expert in baboon care. Miljo died in a fire on the CARE property in 2012. Her life and work have been commemorated in several movies, television programmes, and a book.

== Early life and education ==
Rita Neumann was born on 18 February 1931 in Heilsberg, a small village in Eastern Prussia near Königsberg, Germany, which is now known as Kaliningrad and in Russia. She grew up with a brother in a middle-class family and dreamed of becoming a veterinarian. Her mother was strict and overprotective, limiting the activities in which Neumann was allowed to participate. At the age of eight, she joined the League of German Girls (the girls' wing of the Hitler Youth), relishing being able to compete in sports. Within a year, she became a leader in the Hitler Youth programme and was the province's youngest leader. Her father was drafted into the army, but after the invasion of Poland did not support the Nazi regime and his daughter no longer participated in Hitler Youth. Looking back on Nazism, Neumann later said that she was "young and naïve" only later realizing "the total madness we were subjected to".

When the war ended in 1945, the family relocated to Bavaria in search of employment and schools for the children. They eventually settled in Hamburg where her father found a civil service position and Neumann began attending the Kloster Schule, a nearby girls' high school. Completing her studies in 1949, her plans to qualify as a veterinarian were thwarted by the post-war West German policy of favouring war veterans for admission to universities. She enrolled in psychology courses, but she did not enjoy them and quit her studies when her mother was diagnosed with cancer. After her mother's death in 1951, Neumann took a factory job and brought her younger brother Peter to live with her.

== Career ==
=== Early career (1951–1989) ===
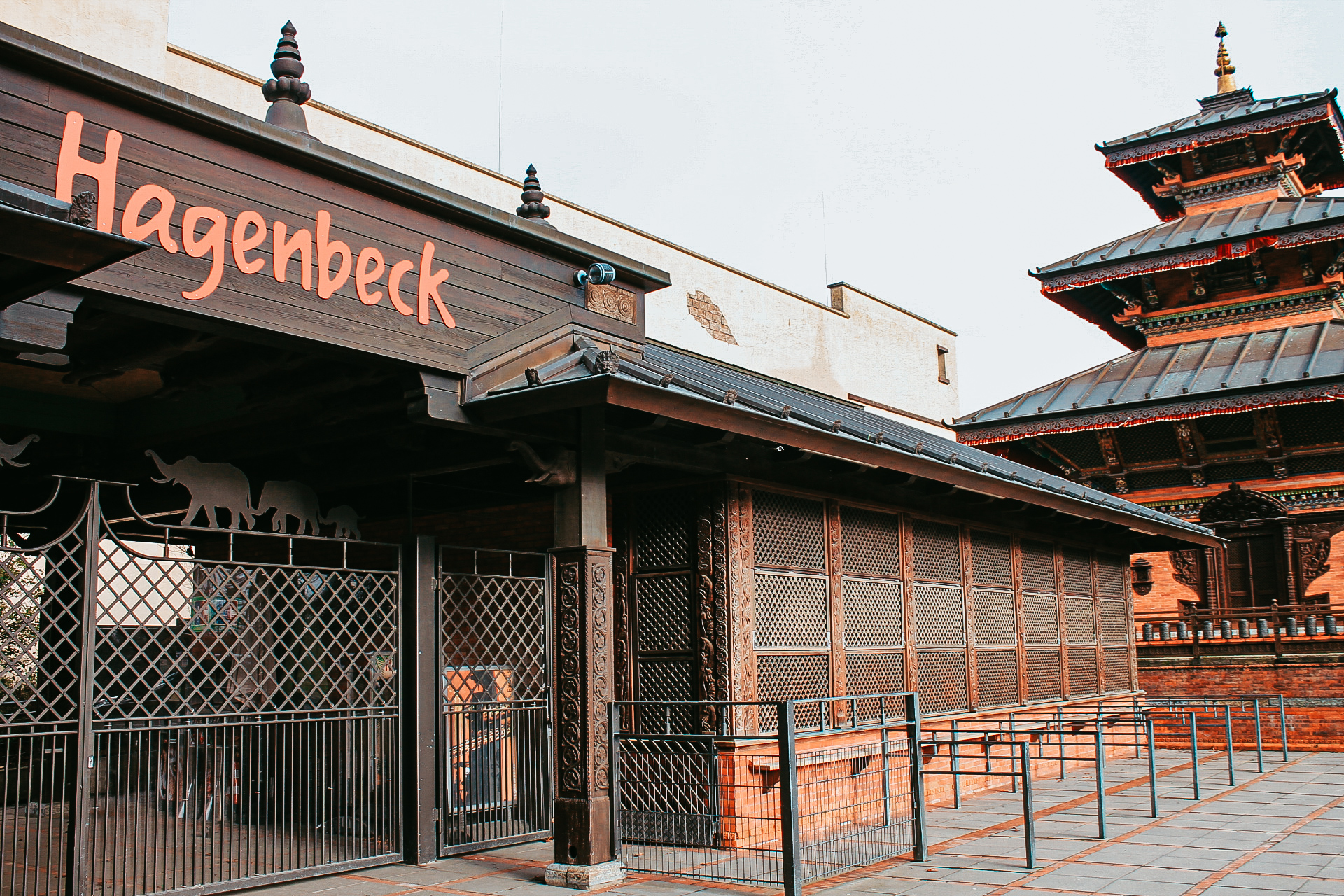
Hagenbecks Zoo, Hamburg

When her father remarried, Peter returned to the family home and Neumann began working at the Hagenbeck Zoo, caring for primates. At the age of nineteen, she met Lothar Simon, who was studying to become a mining engineer at Technische Universität Berlin. When Simon graduated and secured a post in South Africa in 1953, Neumann decided to emigrate, hoping she could work with animals. Simon had arranged for her to have a work permit and an office job, prior to her arrival. The couple married in February 1954. Simon worked in the gold fields and became very successful, allowing Neumann to be independent and adventurous.

On weekends, Neumann would leave Johannesburg and travel to Kruger National Park. She met an ornithologist there, Dr. Kleynhans, who taught her South African history. The two travelled together into Zambia and Zimbabwe, where Kleynhans made recordings of birds. Neumann assisted him in his work by cataloguing his recordings. She learned to fly and because male instructors would not teach her aerobatics, she bought a book and taught herself to do loops and spirals. In 1963, she purchased a 50-acre parcel of land on the banks of the Olifants River in Limpopo Province. She spent a lot of time away from home there. She first camped in a tent and later built a one-room hut on the property, to which she would bring her daughter Karin. In 1972, both Simon and 17-year-old Karin were killed in a 1972 crash in a light aircraft, which he was piloting.

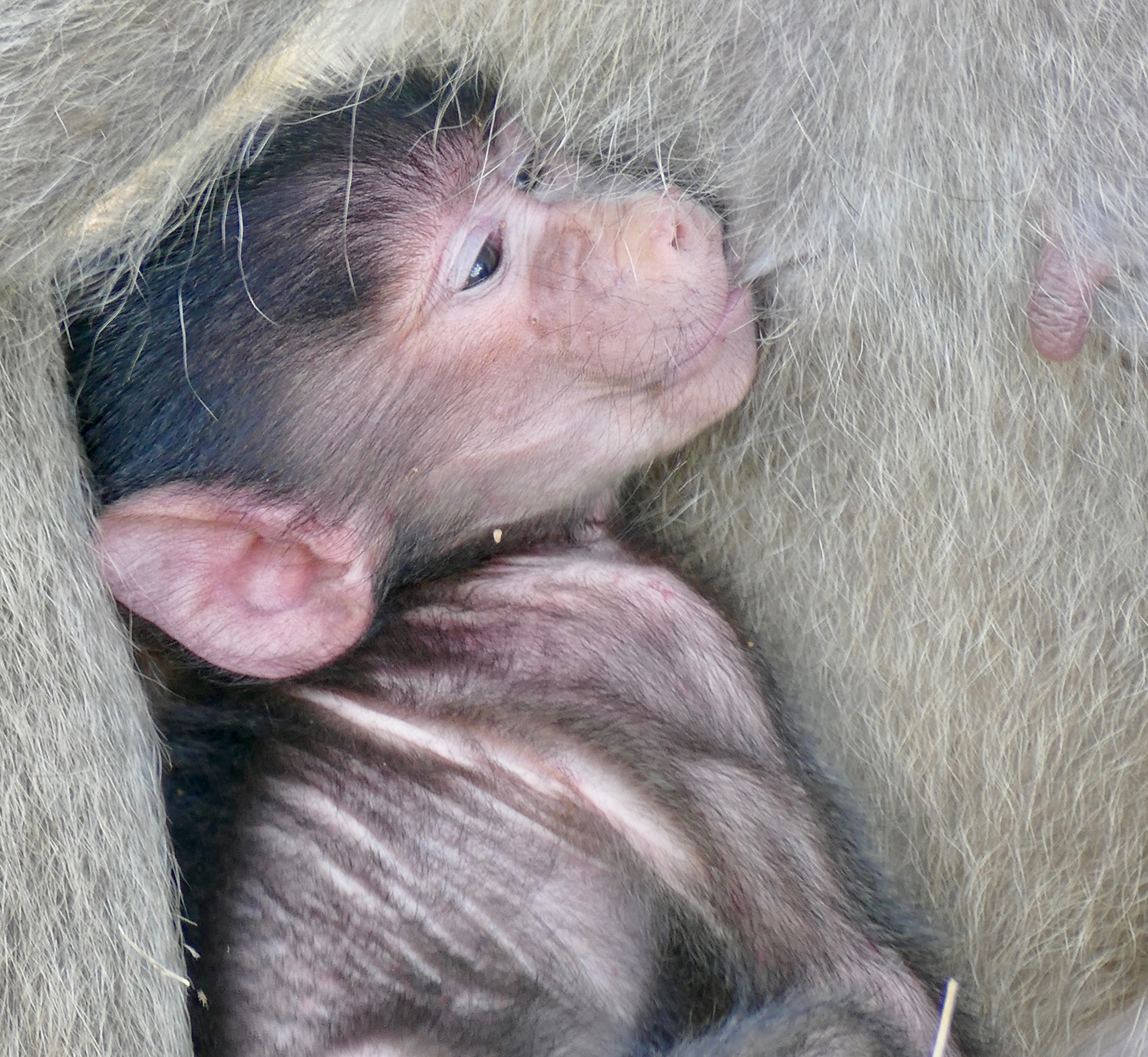
Chacma baboon infant

By 1980, Neumann had remarried; her husband, Piet Miljo, was an Afrikaner. That year, while the couple were on an expedition into Angola, she discovered a baby female chacma baboon (papio ursinus), which had been abandoned. At the time, under an ordinance known as the Vermin Law, passed by the Apartheid government, bush pigs, caracals, chacma baboons, jackals, and vervet monkeys were marked for extinction. This meant that they were considered pests, they could not be taken in, and hunters were encouraged to shoot them. In defiance of the law, Miljo took the baboon, called Bobby, and clandestinely returned with it by way of the Kgalagadi Transfrontier Park, crossing from Botswana's Gemsbok National Park into the adjoining Kalahari Gemsbok National Park in South Africa. She and Piet divorced shortly after.

=== Establishing CARE (1989–1994) ===
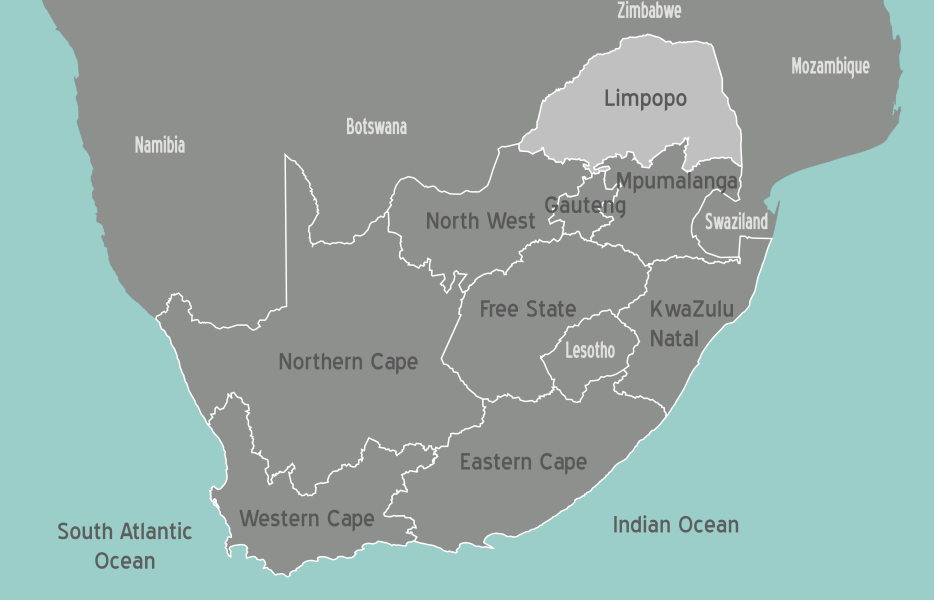
Lompopo Province, South Africa

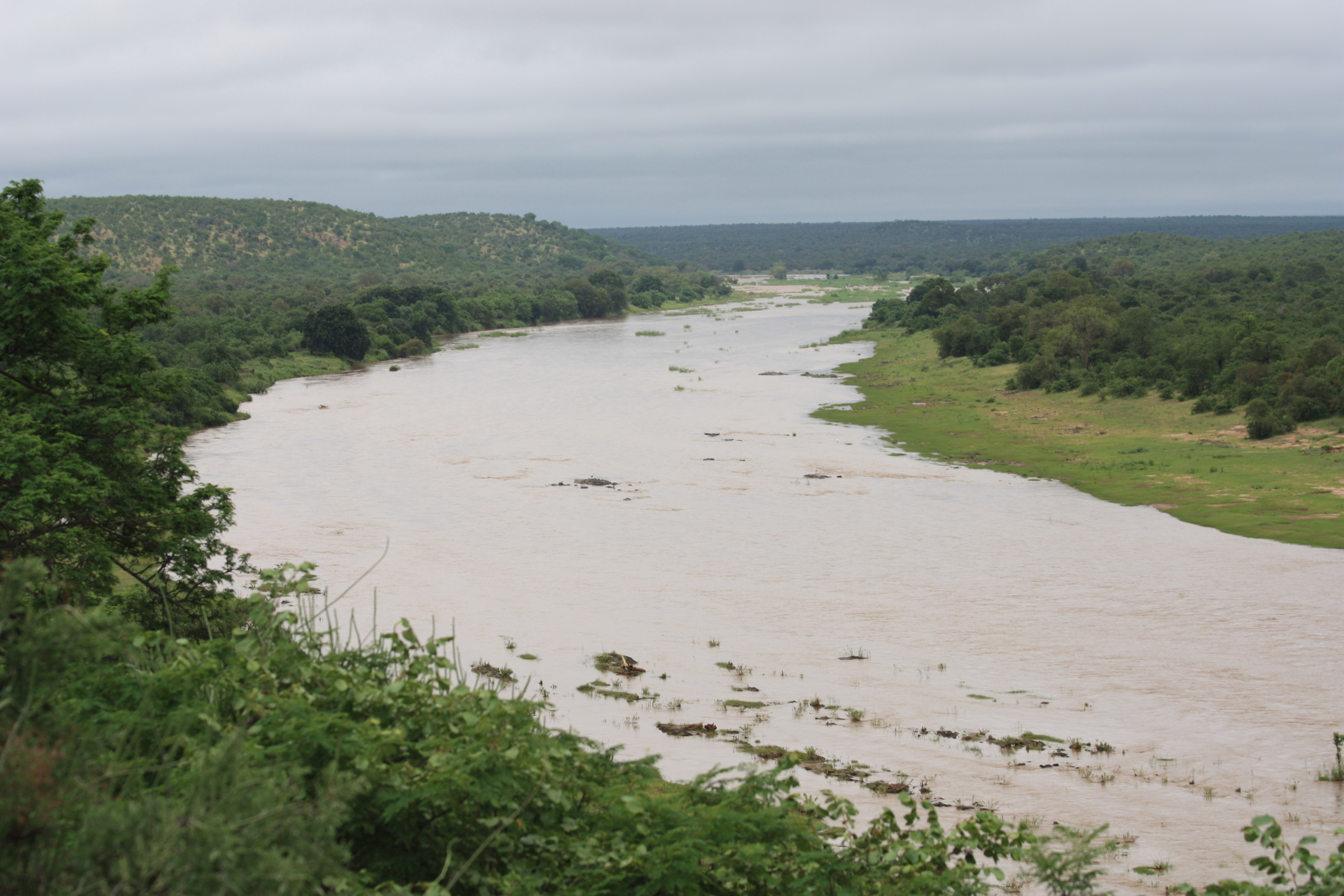
Olifants River

Though she had no formal scientific training in animal rescue, Miljo's humanitarian spirit motivated her to help animals. Her ideals followed those of Dian Fossey's with gorillas in Rwanda, Biruté Galdikas's with orangutans in Indonesian Borneo, and Jane Goodall's with chimpanzees in Tanzania. She began to rescue a variety of injured or orphaned small animals such as warthogs and porcupines, as well as assorted reptiles and birds. By 1989, when the "Centre for Animal Rehabilitation and Education" (CARE) was officially founded, Miljo was focussing on baboon rescue, but continued to take in any animal which had been wounded or abandoned. The refuge she established was thus populated with Cape bushbucks, crocodiles, monitor lizards, waterbucks, and water buffalo, as well as hippopotami and meerkats, all rescued by Miljo.

The aim of CARE was to nurse orphaned and injured baboons back to health, while at the same time pioneering methods of reintroducing troops of convalesced baboons back into their natural habitat. Prior to Miljo establishing the sanctuary, no facilities existed in South Africa for rehabilitating these orphans. When she spoke about baboons being social animals, scientists accused her of attributing human traits to them. Many of the rescued animals which came under her care had been injured in hunting and road accidents or had lost their parents or troop because of fire or poaching, or because of conflict with farmers and suburbanites who had encroached upon their natural habitats. The vermin laws at one time paid farmers per scalp, and allowed them to poison or shoot baboons. Farmers formed clubs to hunt them even on Miljo's reserve. She was charged repeatedly with transporting and harbouring animals without proper permits and was legally required to reimburse members of hunting clubs for the bullets they had used to rid the reserve of vermin.

Miljo developed a protocol for hand-rearing orphaned baboons by first placing them with a human surrogate mother. Babies are bottle fed and constantly in contact with their surrogate, tied with a baby sling and accompanied twenty-four hours per day. As the infant matures, baby baboons are gradually introduced to other infants and their surrogates, eventually being introduced to a troop after they are weaned at around six to twelve months old. After about four years of familiarity with a troop and learning how to forage for food, the groups are assessed for reintroduction into the wild. The first group of ten baboons released back into the wild in 1994, confounded many skeptical professional primatologists. Reporter Julie Hyde Mew said that Miljo was "the first person to hand-rear social wild animals and release them successfully back into the wild." At the one-year anniversary of the first release, observers noted that seventy per cent of the hand-raised baboons had survived.

=== Expanding the work (1995–2012) ===
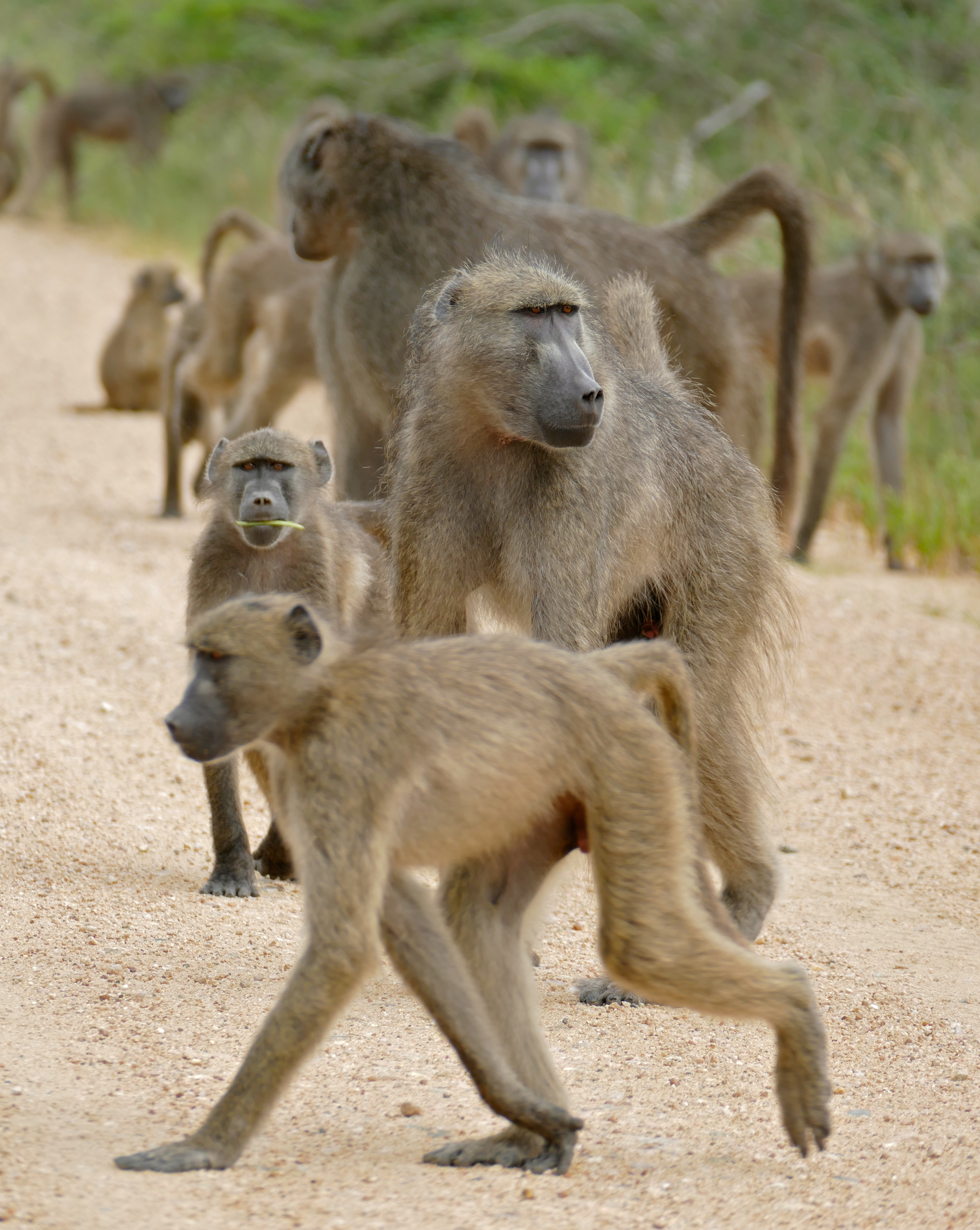
Troop of Chacma baboons

In 1995, South Africa ratified the Convention on Biological Diversity, promoting hope that the Vermin Law would be overturned. Although negotiations and open elections ended Apartheid rule in 1994, and many of the laws passed during that time were repealed, the Vermin Law remained valid in all but three Provinces of South Africa through 2007. The second release was done in 1996, when eighteen baboons were reintroduced in the Mosdene Nature Preserve, which at the time was devoid of any baboon population. Within ten years their population had soared to forty-five. In 2000, Attie Gerber, a professor and co-creator of the television programme 50/50, first met Miljo in the Vredefort Dome. Both Gerber and Mew repeatedly ran features on Miljo's work, using television and film to put pressure on government officials for their mistreatment of animals and to champion Miljo's work.

In 2002, a troop of baboons were rescued from radiation testing being performed by the French military. Nelson Mandela was present at their release back into the wild at the Vredefort Dome Conservation Area to show his support of her efforts to save baboons. Miljo then released an additional troop of thirty-five baboons to the Vredefort Dome Conservation Area in the autumn of that year. When she made the 2002 releases Gerber filmed both for the show. Six of these baboons were killed, two animals being shot and one of the troops poisoned. The remaining members of both troops were captured and taken back to the centre until a safer release site could be found. In 2006, Miljo released another twenty-five baboons into the Mosdene Nature Preserve.

Before Miljo proved that troops could be formed by non-related baboons, scientists had assumed that troops were only formed through matriarchal lineages. In other words, it was thought that females and their offspring spent their lifetime in the same troop and dominant males came and went when hierarchies within the troop changed. Soon large numbers of orphaned, injured and abused chacma baboons were being brought to the centre. Some of the rescued baboons had been held captive to procure faeces which were used in tribal medicines. Others had been the subjects of medical experiments. Miljo's success brought with it sponsorships from the International Fund for Animal Welfare (IFAW) and other financial backing, which resulted in a steady stream of volunteer workers, journalists, scientists, and students, and the rehabilitation facility became known around the world.

In all, more than a dozen troops, totalling some 250 baboons, were released in the last 20 years of Miljo's life. To acquire permits to allow release, Miljo had to prove to authorities of the Department of Environmental Affairs and Tourism that a planned release was a conservation effort rather than humanitarian mission, that there would be no genetic contamination, and that there were adequate resources at the proposed release site to feed the animals. For aging baboons, deemed ineligible for release, Miljo provided a safe haven where they could be cared for and be fed. In addition to her work with baboons, Miljo worked with IFAW to found a lion reserve in South Africa and established a successful breeding program for the Cercopithecus mitis labiatus, an endangered monkey species. As she approached her eightieth birthday, Miljo began stepping away from managing CARE, but remained its most visible presence, and was internationally considered to be an expert on baboons.

== Death and legacy ==
Miljo died on 27 July 2012, in Phalaborwa district, South Africa, in a fire which swept through her home and the centre. The blaze destroyed her apartment at the centre, the night nursery and the centre's clinic. The first baboon she ever saved, Bobby, also died in the blaze, with two other baboons. By the time of her death, CARE had become the world's largest baboon sanctuary, housing around 600 animals. Chacma baboons still enjoy almost no protection under South African law, as they are listed as declining but with a status of "least concern" in the CITES Appendix II. In Limpopo Province, where the centre is located, it is now illegal to kill baboons, though in order to prosecute, a ballistics match must link a gun to the death.

Miljo served as a mentor and source of knowledge to others who had goals of establishing animal sanctuaries. Silke von Eynern, who established a vervet sanctuary, Bambelela Wildlife Care Centre, credited Miljo as her inspiration. Chris Mercer and Beverley Pervan, who wrote Kalahari Dream in 2011 to tell of their efforts to establish the only animal rehabilitation centre in the Northern Cape, consulted her for advice on their own problems with officials and authorities.

In 2004, Gerber published a book, Baboons: Tales, Traits and Troubles, as a tribute to Miljo's work. That same year, she was featured in an Animal Planet documentary, Growing Up Baboon, which aired internationally and told the story of four of her baboons. In 2014, a video, Lady Baboon, which chronicled Miljo's life, was produced by Adrian Cale. In 2016, writer Michael Blumenthal, who had worked at CARE briefly in 2008, published "Because They Needed Me" from his notes made during his friendship with Miljo.
