= Rita Stephen =

British trade unionist (1925–2020)

Rita Stephen MBE
- Born: Henrietta Hamilton Stephen; 9 December 1925; Glasgow, Scotland
- Died: 21 May 2020 (aged 94)
- Education: London School of Economics
- Known for: Trade unionist

Henrietta Hamilton Stephen MBE (9 December 1925 to 21 May 2020), known as Rita, was a trade unionist who fought for the rights of working women and equal pay in the 1960s and 1970s.

== Early life ==
Stephen was born in Glasgow, Scotland, to James Stephen and Mary Stephen (née Morton). She went to Queen's Park Secondary School.

== Early trade union activity ==
Leaving school, Stephen worked at the Post Office for 17 years. She became a shop steward for the Union of Post Office Workers. In 1957, her trade union activity was rewarded with a one-year trade-union scholarship to the London School of Economics (LSE). While at LSE, she led a campaign for shower facilities for students living off-site. Stephen then went onto study at McGill University in Montreal, Canada.

== Campaigning for equal rights ==
As a National Official of the Clerical and Administrative Workers' Union, Stephen was responsible for negotiating conditions for office workers, clerk and secretaries, whose members were mostly women. She specialised in trade-union education and equal rights. After the Labour government brought in the Equal Pay Act of 1970, the slow implementation of the legislation prompted Stephen and her trade-union colleagues to encourage local officers to submit equal pay claims to employers.

Stephen was involved in creating TUC policies for equal pay and education.

In June 1973, Stephen was appointed MBE for "For services to the Food Standards Committee".

== Committee membership ==
Along with membership of Trade Unions, Stephen represented the trade union movement on many committees.

- Before 1957 – Union of Post Office Workers – Shop Steward
- 1960 – 1965 – Clerical and Administrative Workers’ Union – London Area Organiser
- 1965 – 1971 – Clerical and Administrative Workers' Union – Editor of The Clerk, the monthly journal
- 1965 – 1989 – Clerical and Administrative Workers' Union – National Official
- 1965 – 2000s – Mary Macarthur Educational Trust – Secretary
- 1968 – 1980 – Food Standards Committee – Member
- 1972 – 1989 – APEX – National Official
- 1973 – 1989 – British Wool Marketing Board – Member
- 1989 – 1991 – National Union of General and Municipal Workers – National Officer
- 1973 – 1983 – Monopolies and Mergers Commission – Member
- 1976 – 2005 – London School of Economics – Governor
