= Rita Winkler =

Canadian hydrologist

Rita Winkler is a Canadian Research Hydrologist working at the British Columbia Ministry of Forests, Lands and Natural Resource Operations

Winkler is a Registered Professional Forester (RPF) with over 35 years of experience in forestry, applied hydrology, and water-related research. Winkler was an adjunct professor at Thompson Rivers University (formerly Cariboo College) and the University of British Columbia.

== Education ==
Winkler received a BSF in Forest Management from the University of British Columbia (UBC) in 1978, an MSc in Forest Hydrology from the University of Alberta in 1980, and a PhD in Forest Hydrology from UBC in 2001.

Winkler says Star Trek inspired her to become involved with science. She also benefited from the science teacher she had during seventh grade.

== Awards ==
Named Honorary Fellow from Okanagan College in 2016 for her work in forest hydrology.

== Research ==
Upper Penticton Creek Watershed Experiment.

== Selected publications ==
- Changing forest water yields in response to climate warming: results from long-term experimental watershed sites across North America, in Global Change Biology
- Diagnosing a distributed hydrologic model for two high-elevation forested catchments based on detailed stand- and basin-scale data, in Water Resources Research
- Effects of forestry on summertime low flows and physical fish habitat in snowmelt-dominant headwater catchments on the Pacific Northwest, in Hydrological Processes
