= Rita Wright =

Rita Wright may refer to:

- Rita Wright (museum director), American art historian
- Rita P. Wright (born 1936), American anthropologist
- Rita Wright, birth name of Syreeta Wright (1946–2004), American singer-songwriter
