= Rita Tewari =

Molecular parasitologist

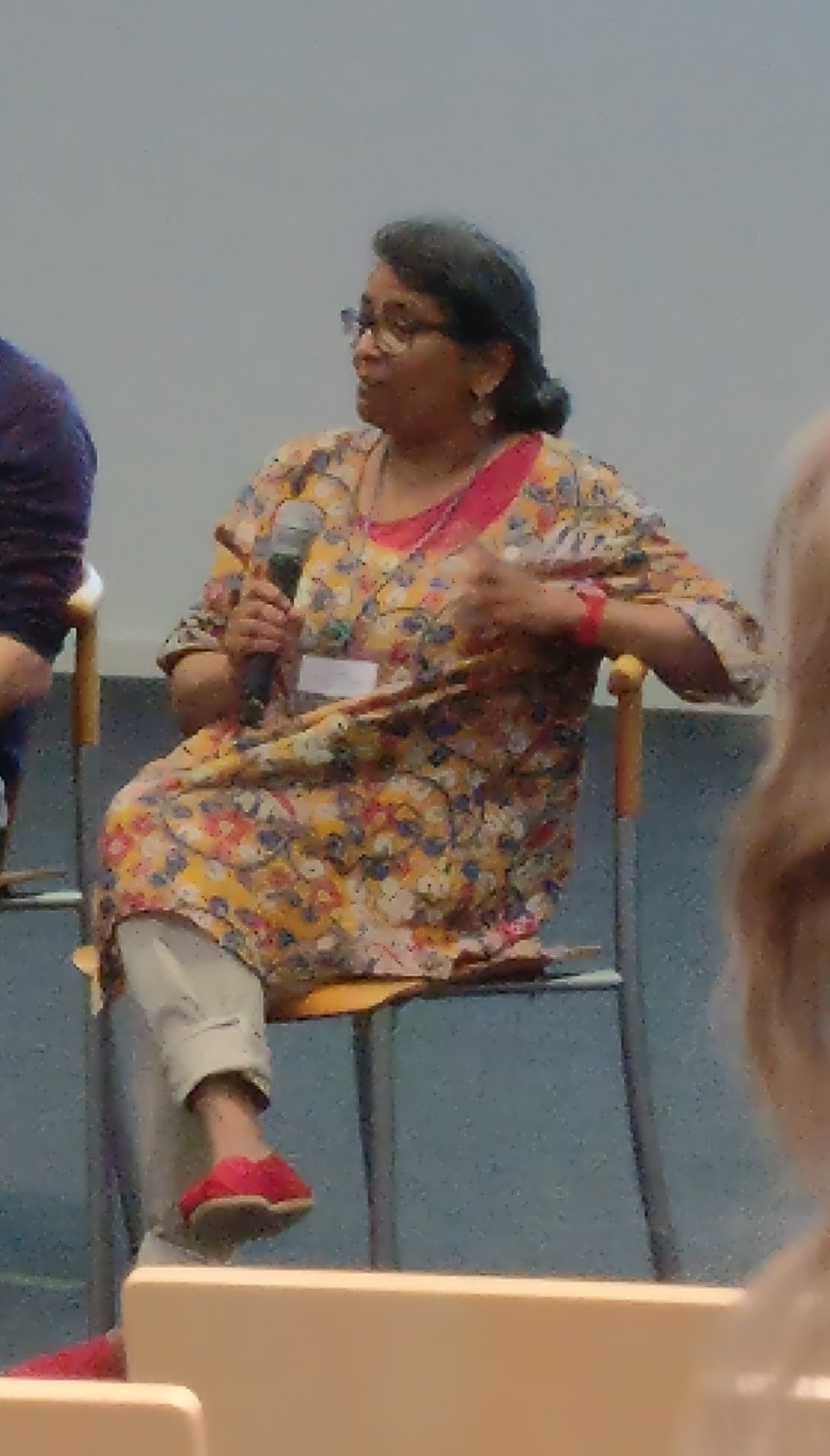
- Rita Tewari speaking at a conference at EMBL
- Born: Delhi, India
- Scientific career
- Institutions: University of Nottingham

Rita Tewari is an Indian parasitologist who studies the cell and molecular biology of malaria. She currently holds a post as professor at the University of Nottingham.

== Early life and education ==
Tewari was born in Delhi, India, however she moved to the North-East of the country when she was growing up. Her father was a professor in social sciences. Tewari reports having contracted malaria seven times when she was young. She initially wanted to study medicine at university but had to read zoology instead due to a lack of choice in her local area. She returned to the city of her birth for her PhD, studying X-chromosome genetics at the University of Delhi.

== Career ==
Tewari held a number of research posts across Europe after completing her PhD in 1989. In chronological order these included a postdoc at the Institut national de la recherche agronomique, France, senior research associate positions at the National Institute for Medical Research/University of Cambridge and Erasmus University Rotterdam, and as a senior scientist at the Sars International Centre for Marine Molecular Biology, Norway. In 1999 she was hired as a research lecturer at Imperial College London, where she first began working on malaria using mice models. She remained here for nine years, notably contributing to research into the role of a calcium-dependent protein kinase in the life cycle of Plasmodium berghei with the lab of Oliver Billker. The results demonstrated the importance of the protein and calcium release in the conversion of sexual blood stage forms of the parasite into reproductive forms upon being taken up by the mosquito.

Tewari became a lecturer at the University of Nottingham in 2008, and was subsequently promoted to associate professor in 2012, and full professor in 2015.

Tewari and her lab have focused on studying the molecular players in malaria transmission and development, using the rodent malaria P. berghei as a model, in the hope of discovering new targets for drugs. A 2012 study published by the group identified a malarial phosphotase essential for the parasite to become and function as the ookinete form, which spreads the parasite through the mosquito. A year later they helped discover a calcium transporter also essential for growth of the parasite. In 2014 Tewari's group published a genetic screen of phosphatases identified across the P. berghei genome. A genetic knock-out could not be generated for half of the genes, suggesting a potentially essential function in the life of the parasite, and six others were found to play important roles in sexual development and transmission. Genomic analysis for protein orthologues and genetic manipulation continues to play a major role in Tewari's work, including the 2015 discovery of malarial cyclins and their importance in development of the oocyst form in the mosquito.

Tewari's work has been accomplished in collaboration with many notable malariologists including Anthony Holder, Robert Sinden and Maria Mota.
