= Rita Brara Mukhopadhyay =

Indian sociologist

- Education: University of Delhi
- Occupations: sociologist, professor, author, editor
- Notable work: Shifting Landscapes: The Making and Remaking of Village Commons in India (2006 book)

Rita Brara is an Indian sociologist, professor, author, and the editor of the academic journal Contributions to Indian Sociology.

She is the author of the 2006 book Shifting Landscapes: The Making and Remaking of Village Commons in India.

== Education ==
Brara has a 1990 PhD from the University of Delhi. Her thesis was Kinship in a Princely State: A Study of Malerkotla, India (1890-1990).

== Career ==
She has taught in the University of Delhi. She is currently a visiting professor/fellow at the Institute of Economic Growth in Delhi, and Ashoka University in Sonepat. Brara is the editor, and previously was the co-editor, of the journal Contributions to Indian Sociology.

She is the author of the 2006 book Shifting Landscapes: The Making and Remaking of Village Commons in India (ISBN 9780195673012).

== Selected publications ==
- Brara, Rita (2006). Shifting landscapes the making and remaking of village commons in India. Oxford University Press.
- Brara, Rita. 2021. Introduction. In Contributions to Indian Sociology: Special Issue on Conversations on the Anthropocene and Climate Change. 55 (3) pp 307–323.
- 2019. ‘Feet on The Ground, Eyes on the Horizon: Anthropology of Environment and Climate Change in India’. In S. Srivastava et al. ed. Critical Themes in Indian Sociology. New Delhi: Sage.
- 2018. ‘Ritual at the Cutting Edge: Everyday Animal Slaughter as Practice and Symbol’. In L.Choukroune and P. Bhandari ed. Exploring Indian Modernities : Ideas and Practice. UK: Springer.
- 2018. ‘Courting Resilience: The National Green Tribunal, India’. UNRISD: Working Paper 2018–4.
- 2017. ‘The Visual Culture of Meat Shop Signs in Delhi’. In U.Skoda and B.Lettmann ed. India and its Visual Cultures: Community, Class and Gender in Symbolic Landscape. NewDelhi: Sage.
- 2017. ‘Courting Nature: Advances in Indian Jurisprudence’. In Can Nature Have Rights? Legal and Political Insights ed. Anna Leah Tabios Hillebrecht and María Valeria Berros. RCC Perspectives: Transformations in Environment and Society. 6: 31–36.
- 2016. ‘Animal Rights vs. Bullfights: The Horns of an Indian Dilemma’. Environment & Society Portal, Arcadia Spring 2016, no. 5. Rachel Carson Center for Environment and Society. http://www.environmentandsociety.org/node/7426.
- 2015. ‘Punjabi Inscriptions of Kinship and Marriage’. In R. Chatterji ed. Wording the World: Veena Das and Scenes of Inheritance. New York: Fordham.
- 2014. ‘Shaping Land Rights: Tenurial Class, Lineage and Gender in Malerkotla, India’. Asian Journal of Women’s Studies20 No. 4 (2).
- 2013. ‘Not so Boring. Assembling and Reassembling Groundwater Tales and Technologies from Malerkotla, Punjab’. In John Wagner ed. The Social Life of Water. New York: Berghahn Books. Chapter 6.
- 2012. CA Forum on Public Anthropology. Comment on John R. Wagner's ‘Water as a Commons Imaginary’ Current Anthropology Vol. 53 (5) October issue.
- 2011. ‘Why a Cousin Becomes a Spouse: Elementary, says Levi-Strauss’. In Dipankar Gupta ed. My Favourite Levi-Strauss. Yoda Press, New Delhi. pp. 62–86.
- 2011. ‘Flowers and Gender in Contemporary Paris: Reflections on a Visual Study’. Working Paper Series 2011/XIII.European Studies Programme, University of Delhi.
