= Rita Jaima Paru =

Papua New Guinean food entrepreneur

- Occupation: Food entrepreneur

Rita Jaima Paru is a Papua New Guinean food entrepreneur, who previously ran the company Dial-a-Lunch.

== Career ==
Rita Jaima Paru was born in Papua New Guinea where she went to Marianville High School. She attended the Papua New Guinea University of Technology in 1997, but dropped out following the birth of her daughter. Following the birth of a second child a year later, she began catering out of her home to provide for them. She reinvested some of the money earned in courses in marketing, tourism and sales. She launched the business Dial-a-Lunch in 2000, but it closed down three years later.

In 2008, Paru successfully applied for the Australia-Pacific Technical College scholarship after seeing an advertisement in a newspaper. She went to Vanuatu where she studied Commercial Cookery. Upon her return, she worked as duty manager at the Beachside Brasserie in Port Moresby, but wanted to work in the kitchen and so moved to the Napanapa Oil Refinery as senior chef and was promoted to head chef.

She became the Cafeteria manager at the Bank of Papua New Guinea in 2013, and became the retail manager for IPI Catering at the University of Papua New Guinea in the following year. She returned to working on Dial-a-Lunch that year, and was nominated for the Entrepreneur Award in the 2014 Westpac Outstanding Women Awards. She catered an event at the Helifax hangar at Jacksons International Airport a week later, and was offered a commercial space by a local businessman. This enabled her to expand the business greatly around the city. Paru retired from the business in August 2017, handing it over to her eldest daughter.
