= Rita D. Millar =

American politician

Rita D. Millar (1884-June 17, 1953) was an American politician and the first woman in Nevada to hold public office following the Nineteenth Amendment to the United States Constitution.

== Personal life ==
Millar was born in Honolulu, Kingdom of Hawai'i in 1884 to Alfred and Ada McCarthy. She had a brother, Jack McCarthy, the publisher of the Yerrington Times. When Millar was an infant, her parents moved to Virginia City, Nevada and then to Hawthorne, Nevada. Millar went to school in Chicago, where she met her husband, James Millar. The couple moved to San Francisco and then to Hawthorne. They had three children, Jules, Jack, and Mrs. Jack Burns. James Millar predeceased her.

She was the president of the Nevada Women's Club and was a member of the Pythian Sisters, International Association of Rebekah Assemblies, the Neighbors of Woodcraft, and the American Legion Auxiliary. Millar died on June 17, 1953. Her funeral was at St. Theresa's Catholic Church and she was buried in the Catholic Cemetery.

== Career ==
In 1916, Millar was elected as the recorder and ex-officio auditor of Mineral County, Nevada, becoming the first woman elected to a public position in Nevada. She was re-elected in 1920. In that election, upon the first count of ballots, Millar was declared the winner by a margin of three votes. He opponent, Agnes B. Crownover, contested the election and a district judge ruled that Crownover had won, 306–304. Millar appealed to the Nevada Supreme Court where the lower court's decision was overturned. Millar finally took office six months after the election.

Millar represented Mineral County as a Democrat in the Nevada State Assembly. When elected in 1922, she was one of four women in the legislature. She beat Genevieve H. Sterling, the Republican candidate who served as an attache of the previous session, by a single vote.

For the last 20 years of her life, Millar worked in the Nevada State Treasurer's office, including five as the deputy treasurer.
