= Rita Smith-Wade-El =

American sociologist (1948–2018)

- Born: 1 October 1948; Washington, D.C.
- Died: 29 December 2018 (aged 70); Lancaster, Pennsylvania
- Occupation: Academic
- Writing career
- Subjects: Psychology, African-American studies

Rita Smith-Wade-El (October 1, 1948 – December 29, 2018) was an American professor of psychology, women's studies, and African-American studies.

== Early life and education ==
Smith-Wade-El was born in Washington, D.C. to Eva Mae and James Edward Smith. She received her bachelor's degree in psychology from Barnard College and both her master's degree and Doctor of Philosophy in psychology at the University of Pennsylvania. In her youth, she was a member of the Black Panther Party and Students for a Democratic Society.

== Career ==
Smith-Wade-El was a professor of psychology, Pan-African studies, and women's studies at Temple University for ten years. For 35 years she taught at Millersville University of Pennsylvania, where she was the director of African-American studies. She created the African-American studies minor and was instrumental in the creation of the Latino studies minor. She left the university in 2018 due to her diagnosis of breast cancer. She was the education chair of the Lancaster, Pennsylvania branch of the NAACP.

== Personal life ==
Smith-Wade-El resided in Lancaster, Pennsylvania for more than thirty years. She had two sons, the younger of whom is politician Ismail Smith-Wade-El. She was a devout Roman Catholic. She died of triple-negative breast cancer in 2018 at the age of 70, having first been diagnosed with the disease in 2008.

== Honors ==
Smith-Wade-El was the recipient of numerous awards and honors, including the Essence of Humanity Award given by the Crispus Attucks Community Center. In 2018, Millersville University renamed its Intercultural Center to the Dr. Rita Smith-Wade-El Intercultural Center. The former James Buchanan Elementary School in Lancaster was renamed in her honor to Rita Smith-Wade-El Elementary School in 2021.
