= Rita Izsák-Ndiaye =

Hungarian diplomat

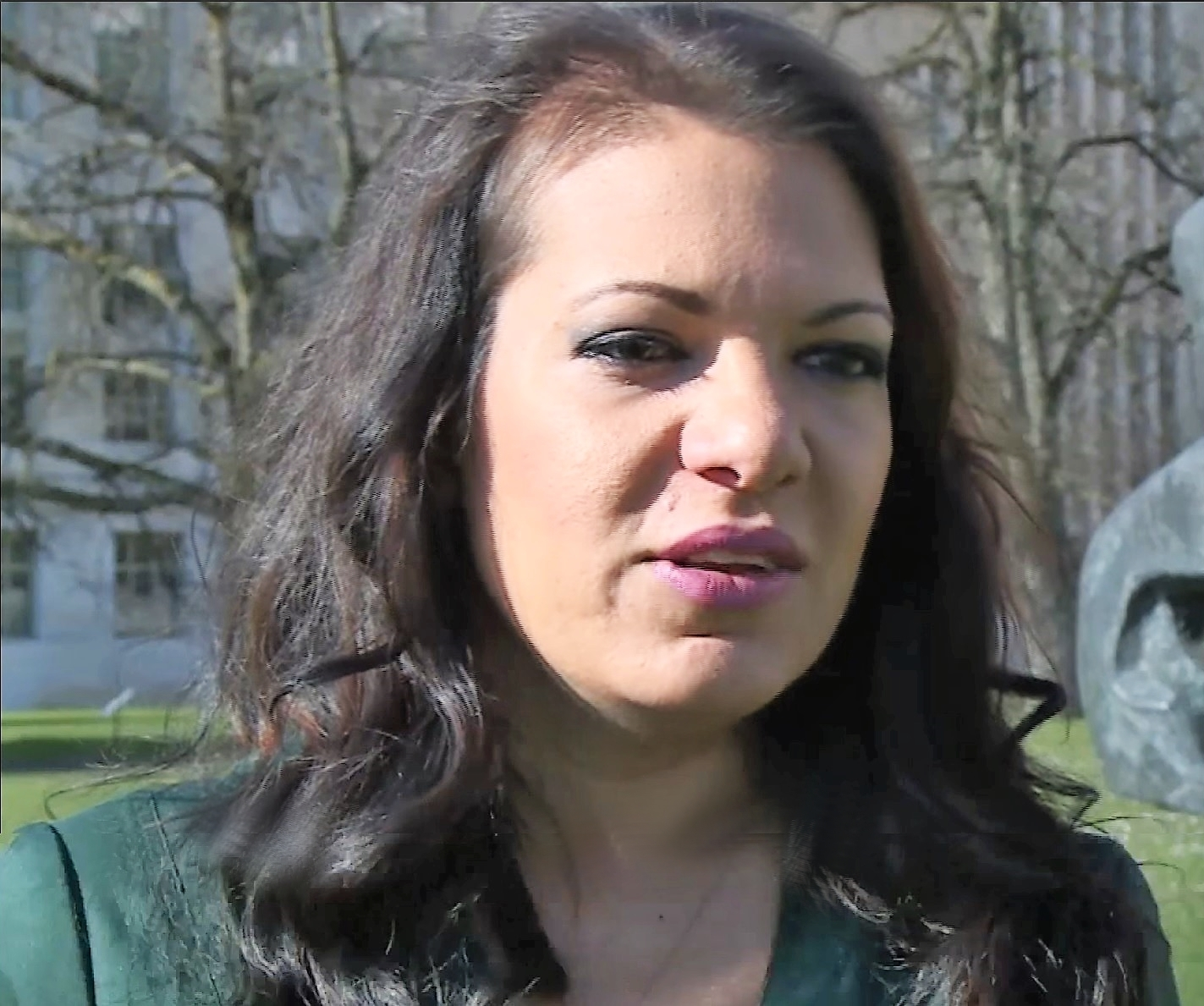
- Izsák-Ndiaye in 2017
- Born: 1980 (age 45–46); Szekszárd, Hungary
- Education: Pázmány Péter Catholic University (LL.M.)
- Occupation: Human rights expert
- Employer: United Nations

Rita Izsák-Ndiaye (born 1980 in Szekszárd, Hungary) is a Hungarian human rights expert and diplomat. She has worked on human, minority and youth rights in various NGOs, the Hungarian Government and with international organizations. She served as the United Nations Special Rapporteur on minority issues between 2011 and 2017, as well as member and Rapporteur of the United Nations Committee on the Elimination of Racial Discrimination from 2018 to 2022. In 2021 and 2022, she was the Personal Representative of the OSCE Chairperson-in-Office on Children and Security. As of Autumn 2022, she is Senior Adviser on Anti-Racism at the United Nations Development Programme.

== Early life ==
Izsák-Ndiaye's mother is of Romani origin and her father's family was forcibly transferred in 1947 from Czechoslovakia, currently Slovakia, to Hungary under population transfers after World War II because of their Hungarian ethnicity. Since her university years, Izsák-Ndiaye worked on minority and human rights inspired by her family's and her own experiences with discrimination. She obtained a Master of Laws degree at the Pázmány Péter Catholic University in Budapest, Hungary.

== Career ==
Izsák-Ndiaye started her international career at the European Roma Rights Centre in Hungary, then she became a Consultant of the Office of the United Nations High Commissioner for Human Rights in Geneva. Later, Izsák-Ndiaye worked in Hargeisa, Somalia, as a youth rights advisor and in Srebrenica, Bosnia and Herzegovina, as a human rights officer with OSCE. In 2010, she became Chief of Staff of the Social Inclusion Secretariat of the Hungarian Ministry of Justice and Public Administration and she coordinated the successful adoption of the EU Framework for National Roma Integration Strategies. She was also the first CEO and President of the Tom Lantos Institute.

She assumed the role as the United Nations Special Rapporteur on Minority Issues on 1 August 2011 after being appointed by the UN Human Rights Council, a position in which she was renewed in 2014 and that she held until 31 July 2017. During her tenure, Izsák-Ndiaye guided the work of the UN Forum on Minority Issues, prepared annual thematic and country reports to the UN Human Rights Council and General Assembly (including on criminal justice systems, Sustainable Development Goals, mass atrocity prevention, hate speech, the rights of religious and linguistic minorities, etc). She carried out official missions to Bosnia and Herzegovina, Cameroon, Nigeria, Brazil, Ukraine, the Republic of Moldova, and Iraq. She urged for the protection of minorities in Iraq, Colombia, Sri Lanka, and Cameroon, as well as of homosexuals in Moldova. At the 27th Meeting of States parties to the International Convention on the Elimination of All Forms of Racial Discrimination (ICERD) in 2017, she was elected to become a member of the United Nations Committee on the Elimination of Racial Discrimination (CERD), as position that she assumed on 20 January 2018 with a term of four years.

Izsák-Ndiaye has also served as senior human rights consultant for the UN Secretary-General's Envoy on Youth office in 2020 and 2021, personal representative on Children and Security of the Organization for Security and Co-operation in Europe. She is an advisory board member at the Global Centre for the Responsibility to Protect, KONA Connect, and the Women Leadership Council of the International Coalition of the Sites of Conscience.

== Personal life ==
Izsák-Ndiaye is also a Senegalese citizen. She speaks Hungarian, English, French and German.
