= Rita Johnson (disambiguation) =

Rita Johnson (1913–1965) was an American actress.

Rita Johnson may also refer to:

- Rita Johnson, vocalist on works including Out of Order (Rod Stewart album)
- Rita Johnson, honoree at 2010 Queen's Birthday Honours (Australia)
- Maya Angelou (born Marguerite Johnson, performed for a time as Rita; 1928–2014), American memoirist, poet, and civil rights activist

== See also ==
- Rita Johnston (born 1935), Canadian politician
