= Rita Pereira =

Rita Pereira may refer to:

- Rita Redshoes (born 1981, Rita Pereira), Portuguese singer-songwriter
- Rita Pereira (actress) (born 1982), Portuguese actress and model
- Rita Pereira (water polo), Portuguese water polo player
