= Rita Ostrovskaya =

Ukrainian photographer (born 1953)

- Born: 1953 (age 72–73)
- Occupation: Photographer
- Awards: Albert Renger-Patzsch Award, Dietrich Oppenberg Foundation (1995)

Rita Ostrovskaya (Ukrainian: Рита Островська; born 1953), also known as Rita Ostrovska, is a Ukrainian photographer, living in Kassel, Germany. Her work has contributed to the preservation of traces of Jewish culture in Ukraine. Ostrovskaya's work is held in the collection of the San Francisco Museum of Modern Art.

== Work ==
Ostrovskaya was born in Kyiv. She studied cinematography and journalism in Leningrad.

Her large-scale project Jews in the Ukraine contains a series of photographs of typical Jewish towns—shtetl—in Ukraine, and the lives of Jews living in them. It was made between 1989 and 2001, beginning with Shargorod, at a time of significant change. Her accompanying text describes Jewish customs and cultural rituals that were being practiced.

== Personal life ==
Since 2001, she has been living and working in Kassel, Germany. She is also a ceramicist.

== Publications ==
- Jews in the Ukraine. With photographs and accompanying text by Ostrovskaya.
  - Jews in the Ukraine: 1898–1994 Shtetls. Berlin: Hatje Cantz, 1996. ISBN 978-3-89322-852-2. English-language version.
  - Juden in der Ukraine. Berlin: Hatje Cantz, 1996. ISBN 3-89322-763-6. German-language version.

== Collections ==
Ostrovskaya's work is held in the following permanent collection:

- San Francisco Museum of Modern Art, San Francisco, CA: 4 prints (as of 19 March 2022)

== Awards ==
- 1995: Albert Renger-Patzsch Award, Dietrich Oppenberg Foundation
