= Rita Maiburg =

German aviator (1952–1977)

- Born: 23 June 1952; Bonn, Germany
- Died: September 9, 1977 (aged 25)
- Occupation: airline pilot
- Employer: Deutsche Luftverkehrsgesellschaft (DLT)

Rita Maiburg (23 June 1952 - 9 September 1977) was a German airline pilot. She was the world's first female captain of a commercial passenger airliner.

== Life ==
Maiburg, born in Bonn in 1952, was the oldest of four children of architects Alois and Gertrud Maiburg. She attended primary and high school in Bonn, graduating in 1968. She began learning to fly in 1967 and two years later earnt her private pilot license at the Luftfahrerschule North Rhine-Westphalia in Bonn-Hangelar. She took a job at the Federal Institute for Air Traffic Control in Bonn and applied to the German airline Lufthansa for a position in the airline's pilot training programme. The airline declined her application as it did not hire women as pilots. In 1974 Maiburg filed civil suits against both the airline and the state (as majority shareholder of the airline), claiming this was unfair discrimination. She lost both suits. She was hired, though, by a smaller regional airline, Deutsche Luftverkehrsgesellschaft (DLT), as a co-pilot. Shortly after she was promoted to captain and became the first female captain of a commercial passenger airliner.

In 1977 Maiburg was involved in a car accident and died of her injuries. She was 25 years old.

A street on a former airfield in Cologne, Germany, is named after her. In 2015, Georg von Toyberg Publishers published a biographical novel of Maiburg written by Eva Maria Bader.
