= Rita Carvalho =

21st-century Portuguese artist

- Born: 1997 (age 28–29)
- Other name: Rita Oak
- Education: ESAD Matosinhos – Escola Superior de Artes e Design
- Occupation: Artist

Rita Carvalho is a Portuguese artist who posts online under the username Rita Oak (her last name means "oak" in Portuguese) and has gained notoriety for illustrating NFL player Jimmy Garoppolo.

== Education ==
Rita Carvalho studied art in high school and in 2021, graduated from the ESAD College of Arts and Design, an art school in Matosinhos, Portugal. Choosing to take a gap year after graduation, Carvalho experimented with different artistic mediums, including digital illustrations.

== Online posts ==
Brainstorming with her 49ers fan boyfriend, Carvalho decided to create an illustration of Jimmy Garoppolo who at the time was injured and enmeshed in trade rumors. She posted her illustration on Reddit on February 3, 2022, and later said it was the first time she posted her art online. The illustration depicted Garoppolo with hearts and a tag that said "Thank you for everything Jimmy." She said "my first drawing was sort of just a 'Thank You' note showing how grateful we were for everything he did for the team. I was kind of sad to see him go." The post garnered 1,300 upvotes and Carvalho was overwhelmed with the positive response. The following day, she posted another illustration of Garoppolo with the tag "Drawing Jimmy G everyday until he gets traded. Day 2" and continued to post a new one in the days following that, receiving growing praise and attention. She created the drawings using her iPad with a stylus and the graphics editing app Procreate.

Carvalho began to integrate pop culture references: day 7 was Garoppolo on the cover of GQ, day 12 was Valentine's Day themed and on day 18, Garoppolo was depicted as Jimmy "James" Bond. She also started an online shop where fans could purchase her drawings on hoodies, mugs and t-shirts.

Instead of being traded as most predicted, Garoppolo signed a one-year extension with the 49ers on August 29, 2022, which corresponded with day 208 of her series. On day 209, she posted a witty response to the extension rooted in the movie The Wolf of Wall Street with the movie quote "I'm not leaving! The show goes on!" She continued her series until Garoppolo signed with the Las Vegas Raiders in 2023 for a total of 404 daily drawings. The final drawing incorporated a Shawshank Redemption theme and showed Garoppolo kneeling as Andy Dufresne breaking out of prison, shirtless and arms wide open as he's embracing the rain and quotes of praise from his 49ers teammates, coaches and general manager.

Garoppolo has commented on her drawings, saying "I really appreciate it. It's really cool, just the uniqueness to it." 49ers teammate George Kittle also commented on the drawings, saying "she drew me as Cartman, and I thought that was pretty good." Kittle made the depiction of himself in Carvalho's drawing his avatar on Twitter.

== Personal life ==
She lives in Porto, Portugal and continues to publish her illustrations.
