= Rita Gerle =

Spanish textile worker

Rita Gerle (fl. 1771–1784) was a Spanish textile worker.

She was married to the silk printer Josep Lavila, who founded a silk printing factory in the city of Barcelona, Spain's commercial center at the time, in 1771. Rita learned the trade from her husband, who was a student of Isidro Catala. When her spouse fell ill and became unable to work, she took over the business. She encountered legal challenges when she applied for a permit to manage the business in her own name, as women were formally prohibited from the profession, even though many worked in the industry illegally.

In 1784, she became the first woman in Spain to receive official approval and certification of her trade as a silk printer from the guilds. This was a unique achievement, and a new title, "approved mistress," was created for her.
