= Rita Blankenburg =

German speed skater

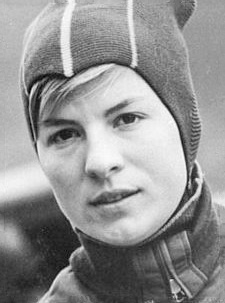
- Rita Blankenburg in 1964

Personal information
- Born: 22 February 1942 (age 84) Berlin, Germany
- Height: 1.62 m (5 ft 4 in)
- Weight: 59 kg (130 lb)

Sport
- Country: East Germany
- Sport: Speed skating
- Club: Berliner Turn- und Sportclub (TSC) - 01.1963-1968; SC Einheit Berlin (ScB) - 31.12.1962

Rita Blankenburg (later Schmidt, born 22 February 1942) is a retired German speed skater. She has been coached by Erich Löwenberger.

Schmidt represented her nation at the 1964 Winter Olympics in the 3000 m event and finished in 17th place. She also competed at the World Allround Speed Skating Championships for Women in 1966, finishing 28th overall.

Between 1959 and 1967 she competed sixteen times at national championships (several national events per year), winning a bronze medal in the 500m in 1966.

== Records ==
=== Personal records ===
Personal records
Women's speed skating
| Event | Result | Date | Location | Notes |
| 500 m | 48.90 | 05.03.1966 | Berlin (GER) | |
| 1000 m | 1:41.20 | 29.01.1966 | Zakopane (POL) | |
| 1500 m | 2:32.50 | 03.02.1966 | Zakopane (POL) | |
| 3000 m | 5:33.00 | 29.01.1966 | Zakopane (POL) | |
