= Gustav Rehberger =

American artist (1910–1995)

- Rehberger portrait by unknown artist
- Born: 1910; Riedlingsdorf, Austria
- Died: 1995 (aged 84–85); New York, NY
- Known for: Painter, Draftsman, Illustrator, Designer, Muralist, Art Educator

Gustav Rehberger (1910–1995) was an Austrian-born American painter, draftsman, illustrator, designer, muralist, and art educator.

== Biography ==
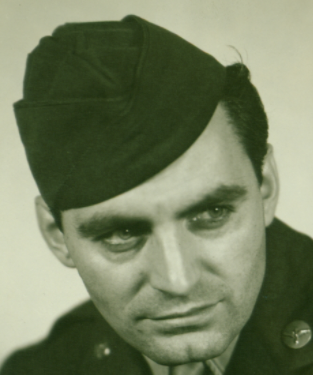
Gustav Rehberger, U.S. Army Air Forces (1943)

Gustav Rehberger was born October 20, 1910, on a farm in Riedlingsdorf, Austria "with an abundance of animals and birds and all of nature's other wonders." as Gustav described. He was the youngest of three children. From the age of two, Rehberger demonstrated an innate artistic ability; using up all the paper in the house drawing and scribbling on it. The Rehberger family emigrated from Austria to Chicago in 1923. At age 14, Rehberger began studying at the Art Institute of Chicago on a scholarship that continued for three years. While still a teenager, he was also on scholarship at The Art Instruction Schools, Minneapolis. After declining two college scholarships, he worked as a graphic designer and illustrator to help support his family during the Depression. From 1929 to 1931, he was Art Director at Reuben H. Donnelly Corporation in Chicago.

During World War II, the Wartime Committee of the Society of Typographic Artists commissioned Rehberger to paint two murals for the interior of Chicago's Union Station (1942). He moved to New York City in 1943 and soon enlisted in the U.S. Army Air Forces. While in the service, Rehberger was assigned to the Illustrations and Format Branch where he created visual training aids.

After the war, Rehberger's illustrations appeared in the national advertising campaigns of Celanese Chemicals, Philip Morris and Sheraton Hotels; were featured in major newspapers and magazines such as the Chicago Daily Tribune, The New York Times, Esquire, Collier's, Everywoman's, Coronet and in various Christian publications. In order to focus on painting, in 1969 Rehberger ceased commercial work. From 1972 to 1993 he taught drawing, anatomy, and composition at the Art Students League of New York.

Emphasizing the importance of education, he said: . . ."worthwhile art is never achieved by mere accident." Described as a "volcanic expressionist" and a painter of "chromatic fury", Gustav Rehberger worked in oil, gouache, pencil and pen to create artwork where "every stroke was charged with a continuous flow of activity; whirling, driving--a blaze of tempests, turbulence, exciting commotion when one would expect the subject to leap off the paper or canvas."

He also became interested in performance art. Evolving out of his classroom drawing demonstrations, Rehberger's performances – the act of painting and drawing before a live audience – soon moved to formal performance spaces that were accompanied by recorded music.

Throughout his career, Rehberger participated in numerous group shows and was the recipient of many awards and prizes. He also had a number of solo exhibitions, among them shows at the Art Institute of Chicago and the Society of Illustrators in New York. Gustav Rehberger died in New York City on July 22, 1995.

== Galleries ==
Gustav Rehberger Fine Art

Gustav Rehberger is represented by Trigg Ison Fine Art, West Hollywood, California.

== Education ==
- 1924–1934 The Art Institute of Chicago, Scholarship
- 1926–1928 The Art Instruction Schools of Minneapolis, Scholarship
- 1927–1929 Carl Schurz High School, Chicago, IL

== Selected shows ==
=== Solo shows ===
- 1993 Open Studio in Carnegie Hall: Rehberger Exhibition of Paintings, Drawings, Innovations (Nov. 9-27)
- 1992 Carnegie Hall Museum Benefit: "The Spirit of Beethoven" (Exhibition & Art & Music Performance)
- 1992 Pompeii Museum, Monica North Galleries, "The Spirit of the Horse" Saratoga Springs, NY
- 1991 Snug Harbor Cultural Center (a major solo exhibition & Art & Music Performance), Staten Island, NY
- 1977 Jacques Seligmann Gallery, NYC
- 1971 Wickersham Gallery, Paintings and Drawings for Beethoven's Bicentennial, NYC
- 1967 Illusions One Art Gallery, Englewood, NJ (May 23–28, 1967)
- 1967 The Little Gallery – Wyoming Valley Art League, Wilkes-Barre, PA (Oct. 14 – Oct. 28, 1967)
- 1967 National Arts Club – Expo '67, Montreal, Canada
- 1965 Society of Illustrators, NYC – Fine Art: Paintings & Drawings (Dec. 29 – Jan. 15, 1965)
- 1965 Old Mill Art Center of the Adirondacks, Elizabethtown, NY (July 1965)
- 1957 Society of Illustrators, NYC – Show arranged by Everywoman's Magazine (Sept. 27 – Oct. 16, 1957)
- 1953 Hampshire House, NYC "Metal at Work" for Continental Copper & Steel Industries (Jan. 1953)
- 1950 Stevens-Gross Galleries, Chicago, IL (Feb. 7 – Mar. 5, 1950)
- 1950 Oshkosh Public Museum, "The Story of Creation" City of Oshkosh, WI (Jan. 1950)
- 1940 North Canton Library, North Canton, OH

=== Group shows ===
- 2003 The Old Mill Art Colony 1932–1967 Open House, Elizabethtown, NY
- 2003 Pastel Society of America at The Butler Institute of American Art, Youngstown, OH
- 1993 "The League at the Cape" – Provincetown Art Association & Museum, Provincetown, MA
- 1972–1993 Pastel Society of America, NYC
- 1984 Knickerbocker Artists, NYC
- 1979–1990 Hensley Gallery of the Southwest, Taos, NM
- 1987 Museum Tour of Master Pastelists – Pastel Society of America, NYC
- 1985 Abelle Gallery, Princeton, NJ
- 1983 The Oldfield Gallery, Pittsburgh, PA
- 1976 "200 Years of American Illustration" – arranged by Society of Illustrators at NY Historical Society Museum
- 1969 National Invitational Drawing Exhibition, Oklahoma Museum of Art, Oklahoma City, OK
- 1967 The Arts Club, Montreal (20 Sanguine Drawings, 4 Pastels, 8 Studies of the Human Form)
- 1964 "Paintings of the Adirondacks" – Old Mill Adirondack Art Center Gallery, Elizabethtown, NY
- 1959 Marino Art Galleries, NYC (March 20-April 17) – "Religious Expressionists"
- 1955–1981 Allied Artists of America, NYC (1965 Annual Exhibition: "The Adirondacks")
- 1954 National Society of Painters in Casein, NYC
- 1954, 1955 National Exhibition of Advertising & Editorial Art & Design, The Art Directors Club, NYC
- 1948, 1950, 1952, 1956, 1959 National Academy of Design, NYC
- 1947, 1949, 1951, 1954, 1959, 1966 Audubon Artists, NYC
- 1946 American Exhibition Watercolors & Drawings, Art Institute of Chicago ("Pastoral," "Horse on Gesso")
- 1943 Works by Artists of Chicago & Vicinity, Art Institute of Chicago ("There will always be Light")
- 1942 Exhibition by Artists of Chicago & Vicinity, Art Institute of Chicago ("Reclining Nude" on loan)
- 1942 Exhibition of Advertising Art, Art Directors Club of Chicago, Art Institute of Chicago
- 1941 International Water Color Exhibition, Art Institute of Chicago ("Beethovia")
- 1941 Annual Exhibition of Watercolors by American Artists, Art Institute of Chicago ("Beethovia")
- 1938 The Society of Typographic Arts, Chicago, IL

== Film promotions ==
- 1976 "Leadbelly", Paramount Pictures, Film by Gordon Parks (Roger E. Mosley)
- 1966 "I Spy", 1965 WNBC-TV series, (Robert Culp & Bill Cosby)
- 1965 "Major Dundee", Columbia Pictures (Charlton Heston & Richard Harris)
- 1964 "Cheyenne Autumn", Warner Bros. (Richard Widmark & Carroll Baker)
- 1962 "Pressure Point", United Artists (Sidney Poitier & Bobby Darin)
- 1961 "One-eyed Jacks", (Marlon Brando) Paramount Pictures did not use illustration.
- 1961 "The White Warrior", Warner Bros. (Steve Reeves as Hercules)
- 1961 "Misty", 20th Century-Fox (David Ladd & Arthur O'Connell)
- 1960 "Hannibal", Warner Bros. (Victor Mature)
- 1960 "David and Bathsheba", 20th Century Fox (Gregory Peck & Susan Haywood)
- 1960 "The Bramble Bush", Warner Bros. (Richard Burton & Barbara Rush)
- 1960 "Under Ten Flags", Paramount (Van Heflin & Charles Laughton)
- 1960 "Desire in the Dust", 20th Century Fox (Raymond Burr & Martha Hyer)
- 1959 "Solomon and Sheba", United Artists (Yul Brenner & Gina Lollobrigida)
- 1959 "Pork Chop Hill", United Artists (Gregory Peck)
- 1959 "John Paul Jones", Warner Bros. (Robert Stack & Marisa Pavan)
- 1959 "Sgt. York", Schaefer Award Theatre, WCBS-TV (Gary Cooper)
- 1959 "The Hanging Tree", Warner Bros. (Gary Cooper, Maria Schell & Karl Malden)
- 1958 "The Deep Six", Warner Bros. (Alan Ladd)
- 1958 "The Defiant Ones", United Artists (Tony Curtis & Sidney Poitier)
- 1958 "The Old Man and the Sea", Warner Bros. (Spencer Tracy)
- 1956 "Helen of Troy, Warner Bros. (Rossana Podesta & Jack Sernas)
- 1956 "Nightmare in Red", Armstrong Circle Theatre, WNBC-TV
- 1956 "Moby Dick", Warner Bros. (Gregory Peck)
- 1956 "The Animal World", Warner Bros.
- 1955 "Gigantis – The Fire Monster", Warner Bros.
- 1954 "Elephant Walk", Paramount Pictures (Elizabeth Taylor & Peter Finch)
- 1954 "The Command", Warner Bros. (Guy Madison & Joan Weldon)
- 1953 "The Stranger Wore a Gun", Columbia (Randolph Scott & Claire Trevor)

== Memberships ==
- The Art Students League of New York
- Pastel Society of America, NYC (One of the founders and first vice president. Designed the original logo that was used from 1973 until 2005 and was a member of the advisory board.) – 1973
- Allied Artists of America, NYC – 1972
- Audubon Artists, NYC – 1953
- The Society of Typographic Arts (STA), Chicago, IL – 1936
- The Society of Illustrators (SI), NYC
- "27 Chicago Designers" (a founding member) – 1936 – 1943

== Selected awards ==
=== Fine arts awards ===
- 1993 Illinois Academy of Fine Arts: IAFA Awards '93 Nominee
- 1988 Elected "The 1988 Honoree" to The Hall of Fame, Pastel Society of America
- 1985 Popular Vote Award, Pastel Society of America ("Approaching Storm"- 64x43)
- 1984 The Marie Devor Memorial Award, Pastel Society of America ("Valiant Spirit" – 11x14)
- 1984 Elected a "Master Pastelist" – Pastel Society of America
- 1984 Knickerbocker Artists' Award ("Wild Spirit")
- 1982 Lever House Award – Pastel Society of America
- 1981 "Exceptional Merit" – Pastel Society of America
- 1981 Dr. Leonard Cammer Memorial Award, Pastel Society of America ("Half-draped Nude"- 36x22)
- 1979 Board of Directors Award, Pastel Society of America ("Rendezvous")
- 1976 "Best Figure" – Tiro A. Segno Foundation Award, Pastel Society of America
- 1974 Paul Puzinas Memorial Prize for Oil Painting, Allied Artists of America ("Genesis"- 48x38)
- 1966 Minnie R. Stern Medal for Oil Painting, 24th Annual Exhibition, Audubon Artists ("Apprehension")
- 1948 Most Creative Painting Award for Oil, 7th Annual Exhibition Audubon Artists ("The Deluge")
- 1925 Four First Prizes and one Third Prize, Boys Week Exposition at the Navy Pier, Chicago, IL

=== Illustration awards ===
- 1955 National Exhibition of Advertising & Editorial Art & Design, The Art Directors Club of New York City
- 1954 National Exhibition of Advertising & Editorial Art & Design, The Art Directors Club of New York City
- 1942 Exhibition of Advertising Art, Art Directors Club of Chicago, The Art Institute of Chicago
- 1938 Society of Typographic Arts, Chicago, IL
