= Rita Tateel =

American businesswoman (born c. 1951)

- Born: c. 1951; Loma Linda, California
- Occupation: businesswoman
- Known for: matching celebrities with companies and charities

Rita Tateel (born c. 1951) is an American businesswoman. She is the founder and President of The Celebrity Source, a celebrity booking agency that matches celebrities with corporate and non-profit clients for public relations, marketing and advertising campaigns, and special events. She has also taught classes at UCLA Extension.

== Early life and education ==
Tateel was born in Loma Linda, California; her parents were Holocaust survivors who owned an egg farm in Fontana, California at the time. She grew up in Los Angeles. She has a bachelor's degree in child development and a master's degree in social work. She worked for nonprofit organizations for 15 years.

== The Celebrity Source ==
Through her work in nonprofit organizations, she became aware that celebrities can be very important to a charity, because they provide visibility and credibility as well as influencing others to contribute. She decided to go into the business of helping organizations to recruit celebrity sponsors, headliners, and participants in events. She incorporated The Celebrity Source, headquartered in Los Angeles, California, on April 7, 1988. Her company finds celebrities willing to work in "cause-related marketing and public relations”. She has been described as "a matchmaker, Hollywood style".

The business maintains a database of more than 5,000 celebrities from film, television, music, sports and fashion in addition to experts from other industries and digital influencers, with information about their biographies, tastes, and charitable interests. "For example, if we need to identify a golfer who's from the Midwest, a supporter of the American Cancer Society and is African American, we can do that." In addition to linking stars to non-profits, she helps corporations to find celebrity endorsers or spokespeople.

== Sample celebrity matches ==
- She has recruited celebrities for the Hollywood Christmas Parade and the Los Angeles Marathon, among many other events.
- For 20 years she has procured celebrity racers for the Toyota Grand Prix of Long Beach, Pro/Celebrity Race, which benefits Miller Children's Hospital Long Beach and Children's Hospital of Orange County.
- When Purina wanted to support animal-rescue organizations, Tateel recruited Emily Procter, a star of “CSI Miami,” because she knew that Procter “lives and breathes animal rescue.”

== Memberships ==
Tateel is a member of the Hollywood Chamber of Commerce and the Entertainment Publicists Professional Society (EPPS). She is a founding member and advisor to the Association of Celebrity Personal Assistants (ACPA). She also helped organize the New York chapter of the ACPA, which is now the independent organization, New York Celebrity Assistants (NYCA).
