= Rita Ferro (diplomat) =

Portuguese diplomat (born 1953)

- Born: Maria Rita da França Sousa Ferro Levy Gomes; 4 August 1953 (age 73); Portugal
- Education: University of Lisbon
- Occupation: Diplomat
- Years active: 40
- Awards: Prémio Femina de Honra, 2020

Maria Rita da França Sousa Ferro Levy Gomes (born 1953) is a Portuguese diplomat who has been Portugal's ambassador in Tunisia, Luxembourg and Morocco. At the beginning of 2020, she was appointed as the ambassador to the Community of Portuguese Language Countries.

== Career ==
Maria Rita da França Sousa Ferro Levy Gomes was born on 4 August 1953. She has a degree in philosophy from the University of Lisbon. After graduating, she taught philosophy at a high school before applying to join Portugal's Diplomatic Service in 1978. She held posts in Portuguese missions in Istanbul, Turkey and Bangkok, Thailand before becoming Consul-General in Madrid, Spain. Her first posting as an ambassador was to Tunis in 2007. In 2012, she was transferred to Luxembourg. Following a re-organization of ambassadorial positions, she ended her assignment in Luxembourg early and at the beginning of 2015 moved back to the Maghreb as ambassador to Morocco. Ferro is married and has two daughters.

In February 2020, she presented her credentials to the Executive Secretary of the Community of Portuguese Language Countries (CPLP). This is an international organization to promote cooperation amongst Lusophone countries, which is headquartered in Lisbon.

== Awards and honours ==
- Ferro was awarded the 2020 Prémio Femina de Honra award. This is an annual award given since 2010 to distinguished Portuguese and Lusophone women. One Honour Award is given annually to the woman considered to have distinguished herself with merit at the professional, cultural and humanitarian level, for her knowledge of and relationship with other cultures in Portugal or abroad.
