= Catalysts (club) =

Women's club in Melbourne

- Formation: September 24, 1910; 115 years ago
- Type: Club
- Headquarters: Lyceum Club
- Location: Melbourne, Australia

The Catalysts, is a women's club whose first official meeting took place in Melbourne, Australia, in 1910 at Sargent’s Café. The club is made up of members who are recruited by invitation only. With a shared interest in intellectual pursuits, the members meet at the Lyceum Club on a monthly basis where a member presents a paper, which is followed by a group discussion and a dinner. The club celebrated its centenary in 2010. Notable members over the years have included Ethel Osborne, Janet Greig, Constance Ellis, and Joan Lindsay among others.

== History ==
=== Background ===
The club was formed by a group of women who were organizing the formation of Melbourne's Lyceum Club in 1910. They had met a few times to plan the details, and had enjoyed the gatherings so much they decided to form another smaller club that would meet while waiting for the opening of the Lyceum club.

=== Formation ===
The first meeting took place on 24 September 1910 at Sargent’s Café. The 19 original members were: Constance Ellis, Ethel Osborne, Janet Greig, Jane Greig, Flos Greig, Georgina Sweet, Enid Derham, Jessie Webb, Dora de Beer, Ray Phillips, May Barden, Alice Michaelis, Elizabeth Lothian, Ida Latham, Ella Latham, Mary Baldwin, Mona McBurney, Jessie Nott, and Stella Deakin. Stella Allan is not listed as being present at the initial meeting, but she is also considered a foundation member.

At this meeting, Ellis suggested they call the club 'the Catalysts', Osborne was elected as the first president, and Michaelis and Webb were elected secretaries. Derham presented the first paper for the group to discuss, It was on the works of Thomas Hardy. The second meeting was held at the Mia Mia tea rooms with the invitation playing on their new club name, telling members:

If they do not catalogue their intention to be absent they must undergo the catastrophe of a fine. A catenutation of Catastates will be provided by Mrs Osborne, Miss Lothian, and Miss Deakin. during which a catonian and cataleptic attitude is required.

The presentation in this second meeting, regarding the women's papers exploring various meanings of 'catalyst', led the club to adopt the motto 'Changing yet unchanged'.

== Activities ==
The club continues to meet every second Monday of the month at the Lyceum club. The group are bound by a shared interest in intellectual pursuits. Some of the papers presented at the club have gone on to be published. However, the meetings are purported to be fun, which papers given cryptic titles, and traditions that play on the clubs name, such as the president being nicknamed 'Mother Cat', and the youngest member nicknamed 'Kitten'.

The club celebrated its centenary in 2010. Anne Longmire wrote the centenary history of the club, The Catalysts : change and continuity 1910-2010, which was launched in 2011.

=== Notable members ===
- Marnie Bassett – Australian historian, biographer and travel writer.
- Ursula Hoff – Australian scholar and author.
- Joan Lindsay – Australian novelist, playwright and essayist.
- Winsome McCaughey – Australian Lord Mayor.
- Mary Meyer (artist) – Australian painter, arts patron and collector (1878–1975).
- Nancy Millis – Australian microbiologist (1922–2012).
- Jocelynne Scutt – Australian politician.
- Alice Maud Sewell.
- Ethel Spowers – Australian artist (1890–1947).
- Margaret Sutherland – Australian composer (1897–1984).
- Eveline Winifred Syme – Australian painter (1888–1961).
- Glen Tomasetti – Australian singer and feminist (1929–2003).
