= Lyceum Club =

Lyceum Club may refer to:

- International Association of Lyceum Clubs, a club for women artists and writers, founded in London
- The Lyceum, Liverpool, a neoclassical listed building in England
- Lyceum Club (Dallas), an American women's club
- Lyceum Club (Australia), a women's arts, literature and social activism group
