= Gwynneth =

Gwynneth is a given name. Notable people with the name include:

- Gwynneth Vaughan Buchanan (1886–1945), Australian zoologist
- Gwynneth Coogan (born 1965), American former Olympic athlete, educator and mathematician
- Gwynneth Flower, former chair of the National Meteorological Programme
- Gwynneth Holt (1909–1995), British artist of ivory sculptures on religious subjects
- Emma Gwynneth Ineson, QHC (born 1969), British Anglican bishop and academic, specialising in practical theology
- Helen Gwynneth Palmer (1917–1979), prominent Australian socialist publisher
- Gwynneth Smith (born 1965), Irish former cricketer

== See also ==
- John Gwynneth (or Guinete) (1511–1557), clergyman of Welsh nationality originating from Gwynedd
- Gwyneth
