= Giancarlo Dughetti =

Italian painter

Giancarlo Dughetti (1931 – 1986) was an Italian miniature painter.

== Biography ==
Miniature painter and elder brother of the engraver Roberto Dughetti (1938 - 2006) was born in Florence on 10 March 1931. When he was 14 years old he entered in the atelier of Pietro Annigoni (1910 - 1988) together with Romano Stefanelli and Riccardo Guarneri. In the first years he painted some copies from Annigoni and famous classic masters. In 1954, at the age of 23, he held his first personal exhibition at the International Association of Lyceum Clubs in Florence and achieved immediate success. In 1962 he married Anna Romagnoli who was his favorite muse and model. His daughter Simonetta was born in 1965. From those years onwards his notoriety spread in Italy and abroad for miniature and pastel portraits for well-known personalities, among which, we can remember: the Prince of Belgium Frederic de Merode, the textile industrialist Carlo Mantero and his wife Mirta Clerici Mantero, the Commendator Gino Alfonso Sada , the Senator Giulio Maier, Amintore Fanfani, the Count Mario Tripcovich, the Countess Marie Henriette Zouboff de la Rochefocauld In 1964 he portrayed the last Shah of Persia Mohammad Reza Pahlavi (1919 - 1980) and his family. Dughetti exhibited his works in New York, London, New Zealand, Australia, while in Italy he held exhibitions in Florence, Milan, Rome, Pisa, Verona, Mestre and Montecatini Terme. Between 1966 and 1979 he painted some female portraits, nudes and female heads. In the same period he also began to paint on alternative surfaces such as small wooden tablets not only portrait miniatures but also still life and landscapes always of great value and sometimes with a faster and more gestural technique. Between 1979 and 1980, under commission of Camerata dei Poeti in Florence, chaired by Adolfo Oxilia (1899 - 1992), he drew some studies for the "Portrait of Pope John Paul II " made the following year in a large miniature on ivory now in the Pontifical Collections at the Apostolic Palace. Dughetti, the greatest Italian miniaturist of the 20th century, died of a cerebral stroke in Vignola at the age of only 54 on 16 February 1986.

== Works ==
- "Ponte vecchio after world war II", 1945, oil on wood.
- "Resurrection of Lazarus from Annigoni", 1949, miniature on ivory.
- "The head of Medusa from Caravaggio" 1950, miniature on ivory.
- "To my mother, selfportrait", 1951, miniature on ivory.
- "Portrait of a girl" (1951), miniature on ivory. Don Shelton Collection.
- "The beautiful girl from Umbria" (1954), miniature on ivory.
- "Adolescence" (1954), miniature on ivory.
- “Self-portrait” (1954), miniature on ivory, Uffizi Florence;
- “The sleeping beauty” (1954) ed “Il quo vadis domine” (1954), miniatures on ivory at Petit Palais (Genève)
- "Annigoni portraits Commendator Mario Puccioni" (1954), miniature on ivory.
- “Portraits of Alfredo Cesarini and wife” (1955), miniature on ivory, alla Museum of Fossombrone,
- “Portrait of Maria Ricciarda Annigoni” (1957), miniature on ivory, Academy of Art, Montecatini Terme,
- "The father of ing. Giuseppe Voi" (1964), miniature on ivory.
- "Portrait of Benilde Gonzales Teran" (1964), miniature on ivory.
- "Portrait of prince Frederic de Merode" (1965), miniature on ivory.
- "Portrait of Ester Soli" (1965), miniature on ivory.
- “Portrait of Shah of Persia Mohammad Reza Pahlavi and his wife Farah Diba” (1965), miniature on ivory at Tehran Museum of Contemporary Art.
- "Portrait of Mirta Clerici Mantero as Ifigenia in Tauris", (1966), miniature on ivory.
- "Portrait of Mirta Clerici Mantero as Eve", (1967), miniature on ivory.
- "Portrait of Donato Sassi" (1967), portrait on ivory.
- "Portrait of Mirta Clerici Mantero on the shores of lake Como" (1968), miniature on ivory
- "Portrait of Carlo Mantero" (1968), miniature on ivory.
- "Portrait of Giulio Carrano and his wife Lola Carbone", (1968), miniatures on ivory.
- "Portrait of lady dell'Acqua" (1968), miniature on ivory.
- "Convalescent" (1969), sanguigna on paper sheep.
- "Simonetta resting" (1969), sanguigna on ivory.
- "Nefertiti" (1969), miniature on ivory.
- "Prayer" - his wife Anna - (1969), miniature on ivory.
- "Portrait of Sandro Sassi" (1969), portrait on ivory.
- "Portrait of the senator Giulio Maier"(1969), miniature on ivory.
- “Portrait of Elda Grimaldi” (1969), miniature on ivory, Uffizi Florence
- “The tuscan factor”, (1969) - his father in law -, miniature on ivory, Modern Art Gallery of Palazzo Pitti Florence,
- "Portrait of Gina Marchi" (1970), miniature on ivory.
- "Portrait of commendator Sada" (1970), miniature on ivory.
- "Portrait of Nella" (1970), miniature on ivory.
- "Portrait of a young lady" (1970), miniature on ivory framed in gold, diamonds and lapis lazuli made by the famous goldsmith Romolo Grassi.
- "Simonetta young dancer" (1971), sanguine on paper sheep,
- "Portrait of Gina Marchi" (1971), miniature on ivory.
- "Woman with fan hand", (1971), pastel, Modena, Collection of Banca popolare dell'Emilia Romagna.
- "Girl with guitar" (1972), pastel.
- "Portrait of Teresa Beviglia",(1972), miniature on ivory.
- "Simonetta waiting for recital", (1972), pastel.
- "Simonetta resting", (1972), tempera on wood.
- “Bianca” (1972), pastel, collection Italian Academy - Salsomaggiore Terme.
- Ritratto di Marie Henriette Zouboff De La Rochefoucauld (1972), pastel.
- "In the stable" (1973), miniature on ivory.
- "Portrait of the count mario Tripcovich" (1973), miniature on ivory.
- “San Giovanni Battista” (1973), drawing, Company of S. Giovanni Battista in Florence,
- "Portrait of bersaglieri General Diego Vicini" (1973), miniature on ivory.
- "Woman putting on stockings", - his wife Anna - (1973), drawing with pencil.
- “Fulvia”, (1974), pastel, Modern Art Gallery of Sessa Aurunca (Caserta),
- "Stool with flowers" (1974), miniature on ivory.
- "The rest", - his wife Anna - (1974), miniature on ivory.
- "Love dream" (1975), miniature on ivory.
- "Portrait of Elisa died in 1972" (1975), miniature on ivory.
- "Tomatoes basket" (1975), miniature on ivory.
- "The basket of peppers" (1975), miniature on ivory.
- "Persimmons" (1975), miniature on ivory.
- "Love simphony" (1975), miniature on ivory.
- "Portrait of Brunetta Pieraccini" (1976), pastel.
- "The beautiful sleeper" - his wife Anna - (1976), miniature on ivory.
- "Woman with straw hat", (1977) miniature on ivory.
- "Portrait of his mother", (1978) miniature on wood.
- "Woman reading", - his wife Anna - (1978), miniature on ivory,
- "Head of old woman" (1978), miniature on wood.
- "Head of old woman with hat" (1978), miniature on wood.
- "Female nude" (1979), monochromatic miniature on ivory.
- "The plant of happiness" (1979), miniature on wood.
- "Portrait of Ruth Baiter" (1979), miniature on ivory.
- "Woman seated" (1979), pastel miniature.
- "Woman on the sofa", (1979), miniature on ivory.
- "Head of Madonna", -his wife Anna- (1979), miniature on ivory.
- "Nude of woman", (1979), pastel.
- "Drawings for the portrait of Pope John Paul II", (1979-1980)
- "Portrait of Pope John Paul II" (1980), miniature on ivory, Pontifical Collections at the Apostolic Palace.
- "In the atelier", (1981), miniature on ivory.
- "Basket with peppers" (1981), miniature on ivory.
- "Fruit basket" (1981), miniature on ivory.
- "Fishes" (1982), miniature on ivory.
- "Miniature and Scottish plaid", (1983), miniature on ivory.
- "Cherries basket", (1984), miniature on ivory.
- "Steelyards", (1984), miniature on ivory.
- "Selfportrait", (1985), miniature on ivory.
- "Leaves and fruits" (1985), miniature on ivory
- "Snowfall in Vignola" (1985), miniature on wood.
