= Lyceum Club (Melbourne) =

Women's club in Melbourne

- Formation: March 21, 1912; 114 years ago
- Founders: Ethel Osborne and Janet Greig
- Location: Melbourne, Australia
- Inaugural President 1912-1914: Pattie Deakin
- Parent organisation: Australian Association of Lyceum Clubs
- Website: www.lyceumclubmelb.org.au

The Lyceum Club (Melbourne), was founded in the State of Victoria, Australia, in 1912 by Ethel Osborne and Janet Greig. It was based on the Lyceum club in London, and was formally associated with the London club in 1913. In the first few decades the Club changed premises a number of times, until 1959, when it moved into its purpose built premises at Ridgway place, Melbourne. In 1973 the Australian Association of Lyceum Clubs was formed to formally associate the five existing Australian Lyceum Clubs.

== Formation ==
=== Planning the club ===
Ethel Osborne and Janet Greig decided they wanted to organise a club in the style of the London Lyceum Club. They held a meeting with thirty women present at the Town Hall in Melbourne on 4 June 1910 to discuss the idea of forming such a group. They decided such a group should be open to women who:

- had university qualifications
- were distinguished artists, musicians, writers or educators
- contributed significant public services to society

Elsie Traill was made the acting honorary secretary and they held another meeting on 7 July with representatives of existing women's groups. It was decided the club should be unaffiliated with the other groups, and instead the club will have 'circles' formed with the approval of the committee, and open to all members. They set the fees and invited women to apply.

==== The Catalysts ====
From this July meeting, it would take another 1 year and 8 months for the club to hold its first official meeting in their new premises. From early in that time, the organising committee were enjoying their meetings so much, they decided to form a smaller informal club while they were waiting. They met for dinner to discuss intellectual papers once a month. This club was called the Catalysts. The club continued to meet even after the Lyceum Club opened, and they celebrated their centenary in 2010.

=== First premises: Brunton Chambers ===
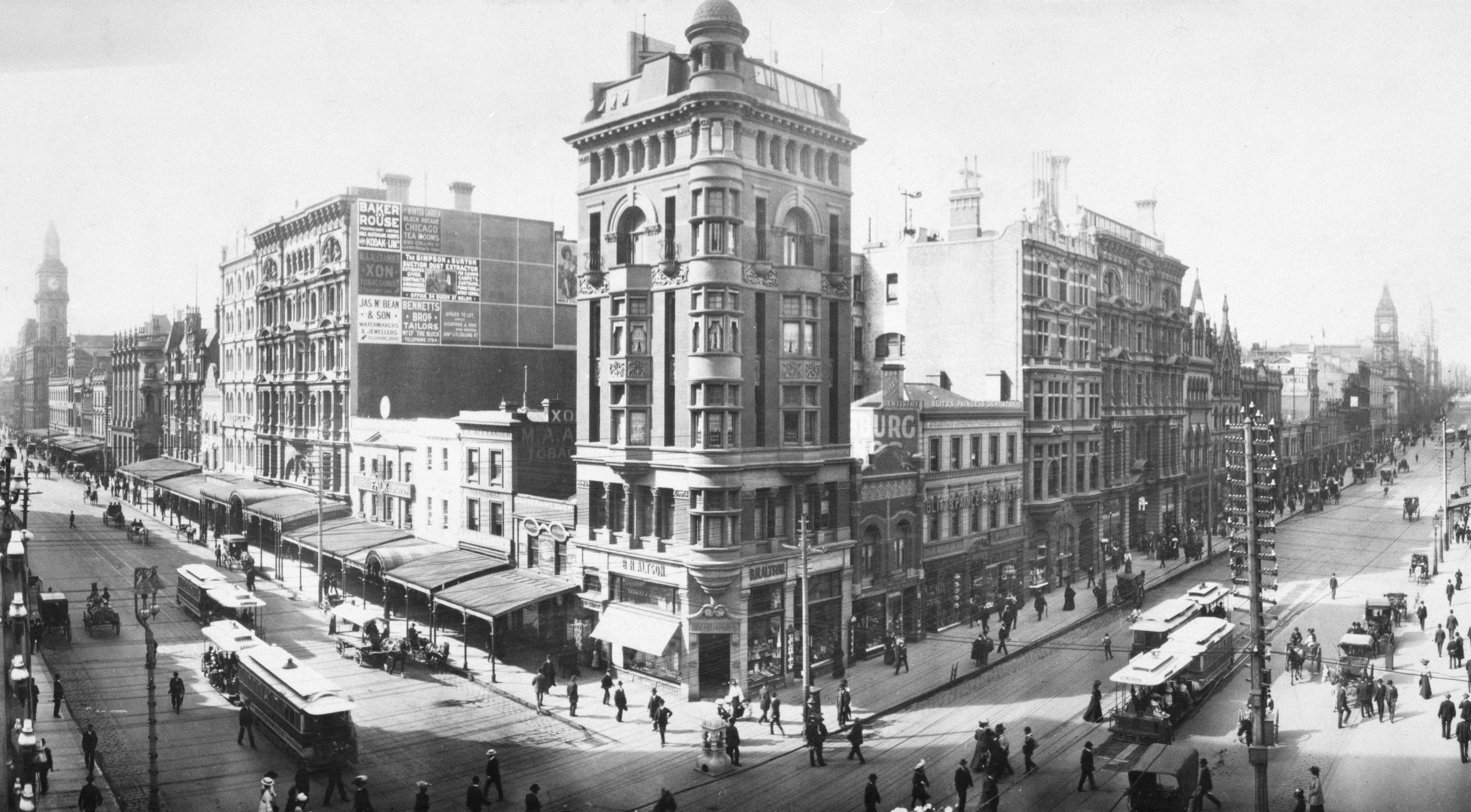
The club's first premises: The third floor of Brunton Chambers

Dora de Beer was tasked with finding suitable premises for the new club. She later reported that this was a difficult task because the landlords and tenants of the city buildings did not want women meeting in their properties. After many rejections, she heard that there was to be a vacancy at the Brunton Chambers which was located on the corner of Elizabeth and Collins Street. De Beer met with the owner of the building, who also ran a tobacconist shop on the corner, Mr B. H. Alston. After his initial reservations due to concerns the women might crown the lift or fail to pay the rent, he reluctantly agreed. De Beer suspected that he eventually agreed, because one of their members Dr Constance Ellis, was his ailing wife's physician. They leased a room on the third floor which had a small dressing room, and a tiny pantry hidden behind a curtain. They stored a gas ring, with a kettle, and some china in the pantry.

=== First general meeting ===
The founders met for the first general meeting at their new premises on 21 March 2012, at 4pm. Enid Derham chaired the meeting. They elected their foundation committee, with Pattie Deakin as their first president, and vice presidents Ethel Osborne and Constance Ellis. The Honorary secretary was de Beer, and treasurer, Mary Bage. The other committee members elected were: Stella Allan, Enid Derham, Janet Greig, Emmeline Lakeland (who later withdrew her nomination), Ella Latham, Alice Michaelis, Josephine Paterson, Ray Phillips, Lucy Rowe, Georgina Sweet, Elsie Traill, Jessie Webb, and Florence Wrigley.

== Activity ==
At a gathering in January 1913, Constance Ellis announced that the London Lyceum Club had approved them as an affiliated club, allowing the Melbourne members to visit the London club.

In July 1918, the club moved to the sixth floor of the Auditorium Building on Collins Street.

On 15 June 1925, the club took new residence of the whole of the fifth floor of the E.S. & A. Bank Building, now known as the ANZ gothic bank building. The official opening, with 400 members attending, was held on the 29 June. The floor was renovated by architect Lorna Phillips, after architect Muriel Stott had to resign from the project due to illness.

The club moved their headquarters to Bank House, 86 Queen Street, and held the house warming on 12 November 1934.

In 1957, the club was informed that the lease of the Bank House would not be renewed. That same year, the club purchased six cottages at Ridgway Place, Melbourne, and signed a contract to erect a new building to house the club. In 1958, the club relocated to temporary premises at 140 Flinders Lane, Melbourne, until May 1959, when the new premises are finished and officially opened.

In 1973, the Australasian Association of Lyceum Clubs was formed, as an umbrella group in which the Melbourne group was associated with the clubs from Brisbane, Adelaide, Sydney, and Perth.

== Today ==
The Lyceum Club Melbourne continues to operate from its clubhouse in Ridgway Place in Melbourne's central business district. Founded to provide opportunities for intellectual, cultural and social engagement among women, the Club remains one of the largest and most active Lyceum Clubs in the world, with more than 1,400 members.

The Club offers a program of cultural, intellectual and social activities, including lectures, special events, club lunches and dinners, and a range of special-interest groups known as "Circles". First established in 1915, the Circles continue to be a central feature of Club life.

The clubhouse includes dining and event facilities overlooking the gardens of the neighbouring Melbourne Club. Accommodation is available for members and eligible visitors, and the Club participates in reciprocal arrangements with Lyceum and affiliated clubs in Australia and internationally.

Between 2016 and 2018, the clubhouse underwent a major refurbishment and expansion designed by Kerstin Thompson Architects. The project revitalised the Club's facilities and increased capacity for member activities and events. The refurbishment has been described as award-winning and forms part of the building's continuing architectural significance.

== Notable members ==
- Alice Elizabeth Anderson – Australian businesswoman (1897–1926).
- Mary Sophia Alston – Australian philanthropist (1856–1932).
- Frances Barkman – Australian school teacher and charity worker.
- Kathleen Best – Australian Army officer.
- Margaret Blackwood – Australian botanist and geneticist.
- Mary Grant Bruce – Australian children's writer and journalist.
- Gwynneth Vaughan Buchanan – Australian zoologist.
- Ada Cambridge – Australian writer (1844–1926).
- Kate Isabel Campbell – Australian physician and paediatrician (1899 – 1986).
- Ethel Carrick – English Impressionist and Post-Impressionist painter.
- Nora Clench – Canadian musician (1867–1938).
- Ola Cohn – Australian artist, sculptor (1892–1964).
- Sophie Charlotte Ducker – German-Australian botanist (1909–2004).
- Constance Duncan – Australian welfare activist.
- Kathleen Fitzpatrick – Australian academic and historian.
- Jeannie Gunn – Australian novelist.
- Ellison Harvie – Australian architect.
- Fay Marles – Australian public servant (1926–2024).
- Anne Montgomery – Australian artist, printmaker, muralist and lecturer.
- Dora Serle – Australian artist (1875–1968.
- Clara Southern – Australian artist (1860–1940).
- Margaret Sutherland – Australian composer (1897–1984).
- Kathleen Syme – Australian journalist, company director and welfare worker (1896–1977).
- Irene Frances Taylor – Australian journalist and activist.
- Violet Teague – Australian artist (1872–1951).
- Marjorie Tipping – Australian historian (1917–2009).
- Jessie Vasey – Australian founder & President of the War Widows' Guild of Australia (1897-1966).
- Annie Watson Lister – Australian suffragist and philanthropist (1866–1928).
- Margareta Webber – Australian Bookseller (1891–1983).
- Dora Wilson – British-born Australian artist (1883–1946).
- Olwen Wooster – Australian air force officer and telecommunications engineer.
- Isabella Younger Ross – Australian medical practitioner (1887–1956).
