= Lothian (disambiguation) =

Lothian is a traditional region in Scotland.

Lothian or Lothan may also refer to:

== Scotland ==
- Lothian and Borders
  - East Lothian
  - West Lothian
  - Midlothian
  - Edinburgh
- Lothian (Scottish Parliament electoral region)
  - and its predecessor, Lothians (Scottish Parliament electoral region)
- NHS Lothian, national health service region
- Lothian Buses, Bus Operator in Edinburgh region, Scotland

== People ==
- Marquess of Lothian
  - Philip Kerr, 11th Marquess of Lothian (1882 - 1940) British politician specializing in foreign affairs
- Albert Lothian, Scottish architect
- Dan Lothian, American reporter for CNN
- Elizabeth Inglis Lothian (1881 - 1973), Australian teacher of classics
- Noel Lothian, Australian botanist
- Lothan Cousins, Jamaican politician

== Other uses ==
- Lothian, Maryland, a community in the United States
- Lothian Books, Melbourne, Australia
