= Lyceum Club (Australia) =

Association of women's clubs in Australia

The Australian Association of Lyceum Clubs, formed in 1972 from several smaller clubs, is an association for women who are dedicated to lifelong learning and social engagement. The aim of the AALC is to promote a spirit of goodwill and understanding within the Association and to enhance the enjoyment of Lyceum by providing opportunities for contact and friendship with members of other Lyceum Clubs. The first Lyceum Club was founded in London, England in 1904 by Constance Smedley.

Ethel Osborne and Janet Greig founded the first Australian of the Australian Lyceum Clubs, Lyceum Club (Melbourne) after visiting the London club in 1910, and Ethel was elected vice-president during the first meeting on 21 March 1912.

== Member groups ==
There are several Lyceum clubs in Australia.

=== Adelaide ===
The Lyceum Club Adelaide was formed in 1922 by Dr Helen Mayo. From 1924 to 1927 club rooms were in the upper floor of member Dr. Violet Plummer's home and consulting rooms at 222 North Terrace, then from 1927 the entire top floor and piazza of the Fada Building, 200 North Terrace. A feature was the elegantly furnished, 23 by 17 feet (7.0 by 5.2 m) "strangers' room". In 1934 a library was established.

They moved to larger premises in the CML building, King William Street, in 1936. Membership had grown from 43 to 244 in 16 years. Present-day clubrooms are located at 111 Hutt Street with the Army and Navy Club.

==== Some officeholders ====
- Presidents: By the club' Constitution, the office of president changes every two years: 1922 Dr Helen Mayo; 1924 Dr Christina Krakowsky; 1926 Mrs John Corbin; 1928 Mrs Charles Todd 1930 Mrs. Allen Simpson; 1932 Dr. Eleanor Allen (died 1937); 1934 Lady Mawson; 1936 Mabel Marryat; 1938 Mrs A. Killen Macbeth; 1940 Mrs. Carlile McDonnell; 1942 Mrs Charles A. Hutchinson; 1944 Mrs A. Grenfell Price;
- Secretary: 1922 Margaret Darnley Naylor; 1924–1928 Mildred Mocatta; 1928–1944 Rica Hübbe
- Treasurer: 1922 Annie Hornabrook 1923 Florence M. Saunders; 1926 Martha Crompton; Mrs A. E. H. Evans; 1928–1944 Dorothy L. Gilbert 1944– Mrs Percy Ifould

=== Brisbane Club ===
The Lyceum club, Brisbane, was formed in 1919.

=== Perth Club ===
The Perth club, called the Karrakatta Club, formed in 1894 and is the oldest women's club in Australia. It joined with the Lyceum clubs in 1923.

=== Melbourne ===
The Lyceum Club, Melbourne, founded in March 1912 in rented premises at the corner of Collins and Elizabeth Streets, and progressively moved to larger rooms as membership grew, until in 1957 purchasing or building rooms of their own at Ridgway Place, off Little Collins Street. Membership is open to "women connected with or distinguished in literature, science, education, music or art, philanthropy, journalism, social or public service and the learned professions".

=== Sydney ===
The Sydney Lyceum Club was founded in 1914, but later dissolved in 1982. However, the club was reformed in 1992 due to rekindled interest.
