= Frances Derham =

Australian artist and art educator

Frances Derham MBE
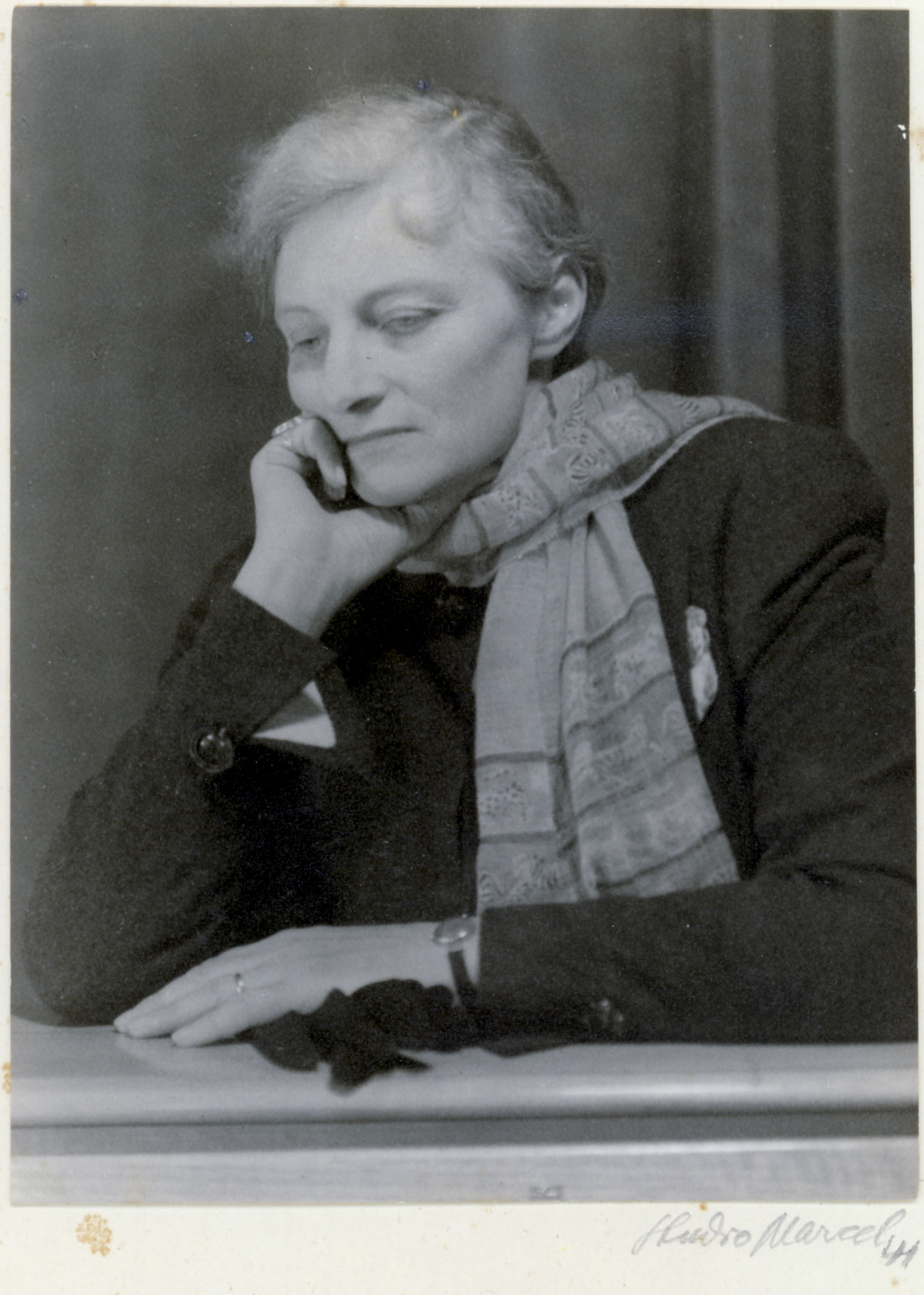
- Frances Derham in 1941
- Born: Frances Alexandra Mabel Letitia Anderson; 15 November 1894; Shepparton, Victoria, Australia
- Died: 5 November 1987 (aged 92); Melbourne, Australia
- Resting place: Kew Cemetery, Melbourne, Victoria
- Education: National Gallery of Victoria Art School, Eastern Suburbs Technical College, George Bell School
- Known for: painting, art education
- Spouse: Alfred Plumley Derham
- Children: 4
- Parent(s): Ellen Mary Anderson (née White-Spunner), Joshua Thomas Noble Anderson
- Awards: MBE
- Elected: vice-president, Arts and Crafts Society of Victoria

Frances Alexandra Mabel Letitia (Frankie) Derham MBE (15 November 1894 – 5 November 1987) was an Australian artist and art educator. She studied aboriginal design at first hand and incorporated it in her own works. As a teacher, lecturer, and active committee member, she advocated for the value of art in education. Her work with child art and progressive education led to the establishment of the Frances Derham Collection of Child Art in the National Gallery of Australia. Her pioneering efforts in art education and advocacy were recognized with her appointment as a Member of the Order of the British Empire (MBE) in 1950.

== Early life ==
Frances (Frankie) Derham was born to parents of Irish heritage; Ellen Mary Anderson (née White-Spunner) and Joshua Thomas Noble Anderson, a civil engineer. A sister was Alice Anderson, mechanic, chauffeur and Kew Garage proprietor who ran a pioneering women's taxi service.

Growing up as the eldest daughter with five siblings, and due to her father's peripatetic employment, Frances was educated by various governesses and briefly attended Lauriston Girls' School. From 1901 (1903 according to some sources), until 1906 the family relocated to New Zealand, where Frances attended the Dunedin branch of the South Kensington Art School. During a brief visit to Ireland she studied at Belfast School of Art.

The family returned to Australia in 1907 and Derham spent her teenage years on a property 'Springbank' at Narbethong near Healesville, Victoria. Frances' father took on her education, teaching her drafting, bookkeeping, and general subjects and after acquiring her Merit certificate at the local school she assisted her father with drafting. Her father was consulting engineer for Walter Burley Griffin and his wife Marion Mahony Griffin, who were an influence on her.

== Art training ==
Between 1911 and 1913, Frances attended the National Gallery Art School and sculpture classes at Eastern Suburbs Technical College. The National Gallery of Victoria holds numbers of designs and drawings from 1912 which are in an Art Nouveau style, while others from and after 1915 imitate Egyptian art.

From 1930 and 1936–39, Derham intermittently attended the George Bell School. In 1982 she held a retrospective exhibition of her work in tribute to Bell. She also studied with Mary Cecil Allen (1923, 1936, 1950, and 1960), whose unpublished biography is among Derham's papers, and with Ludwig Hirschfield-Mack (1959).

== Marriage and teaching ==
Derham's 20-year-old brother Stewart's death in 1913 by drowning while surf fishing off South Head, caused financial strain on the family. Consequently, Frances commenced a teaching career at Swinburne Girls' Junior Technical School.

Since at the time married women were not permitted by the Victorian government to teach, Derham's employment at the Junior Technical School for Girls ceased after her marriage on 10 July 1917 at St Mary's Church of England, Caulfield to Captain Alfred Plumley Derham, an ANZAC veteran and medical student. She juggled her role as a wife and mother, raising four sons, while pursuing her teaching career.

She later worked at Ruyton Girls' School, Kew, as a teacher for a special class in design. In 1928 until 1964, Frances took on the position of Lecturer in Art and Child Art at Kindergarten Training College, where she made significant contributions to art education. She was invited in 1935 by Margaret Lyttle to teach at "Preshil" Kindergarten and Primary School and Mercer House (Associated Teachers' Training Institute) and her commitment to 'child art' developed from that experience.

== Child art ==
Derham's interest in progressive education led her to embrace the ideas of new Kindergarten Training College director Christine Heinig and art education theorists such as Viktor Lowenfeld and initiated research in this emerging field of children's art actively raising awareness of the value of art and creativity for early childhood development and `visual thinking'. With Heinig she contributed to the establishment, design and resources of the Lady Gowrie child centres.

In January 1939 Derham, writing in The Age newspaper on an outdoor holiday art activity held in Melbourne's Exhibition Gardens for some "four or five hundred children," provides an insight into her belief in the value of art to children;

It is often said that the age of five to eight years is the age of imagination, and that imagery dies a natural death with all but the specially gifted at about eight years. That this is not true in art has been proved by those who have taught art consistently in unorthodox ways. The little child can often record amazing mental Impressions, but he cannot copy, nor can he draw from- nature without strain and damage to this other faculty of his. He is born into this varied world of beauty as its inheritor, but not in the narrow sense of possession. He is the heir of all the ages— of their culture— but it must not remain with him, it is for him to pass on, and this he can only do if he is trained to do so, This training involves not merely academic appreciation of the arts, but the development of faculties of observation and feeling coupled with the power to express what is observed or felt. That this can be done at an early age is well known — that it should be done generally is not realised.

On 16 June that year Derham presented 'The Child and His Art' at the Kindergarten Graduates' Club at the Kindergarten Training College, Hay Street West in Perth.

Derham regularly exhibited from her expanding collection of children's art, for instance exhibiting drawings and paintings by the children of 22 countries at Cheshires Bookshop in Melbourne 26 August to 9 September 1950.

== Educational theorist and advisor ==
Derham became a foundation member (1956) and president (1959–61) of the Art Teachers Association of Victoria. She was Australia's representative at conferences of the International Society for Education Through Art (InSEA) in 1960 and 1963 and also served as a visiting lecturer at Columbia University, New York, in 1963. Derham spoke on child art and its role in the emotional development of the child at the Australian National University. Her practical handbook, Art For the Child Under Seven (1961), remained popular among parents and educators and saw seven editions, its last edition being released in 2003.

Derham's passion for art education extended to her active involvement in numerous committees related to art and education. She served on committees for the Lyceum Club Advisory Committee for Art, Arts and Crafts Society, Nursery School Committee, Lady Gowrie Child Centre, A.I.F. Women's Association Auxiliary for POW of Japan, Kew Community Aid Auxiliary, Art Teachers' Association of Victoria, Australian Society for Education through Art, and Advisory Council for Children with Impaired Hearing.

== Indigenous art ==
After exchanging letters with the anthropologist Charles Mountford and the artist Rex Battarbee. In 1938 she visited, via Adelaide, the Hermannsburg mission in the Northern Territory where she collected more than 200 drawings made in a non-traditional, European manner, which she later toured, starting in June 1938, as the Exhibition of child art from many countries in Melbourne, Sydney, Adelaide, Perth and Hobart. Fontana notes that some of the children were later famous as artists of the Hermannsburg School. George Bell wrote: "The whole effect of the show is stimulating and is a lesson on the encouragement of natural expression in art to all teachers and, indeed, to all artists who are not mentally sterile." Derham in 1939 proposed that while European children from five to 14 years of age used eidetic memory in making their art, in "primitive races" the eidetic capacity was retained to a far greater age, and their retention of images seen was longer, enabling them to draw objects from memory.

In 1948 she travelled to the Aurukun Mission, Aurukun, Queensland to teach and study the art of the Aboriginal children and subsequently contributed illustrations for educational materials for Aboriginal children, including the pen and ink illustrations for the 1951 book The first Australian's first book and its subsequent editions by Geraldine Mackenzie whose work Derham promoted in an article on "The Art of Children", in the January 1948 issue of the Victorian Artists Society magazine The Australian Artist.

In 1960 she was to visit Papua New Guinea for five days and again in 1967, on which occasion she judged an art show, accepting as winner of the abstract section a painting by a group of golfers that they had entered as a joke. Unrepentant, in a press statement Derham said it won because the free and uninhibited party atmosphere in which it had been produced resulted in a joyous image.

Her understanding of Indigenous culture enriched the modernist themes that were emerging in her own artistic works.

== Artist ==
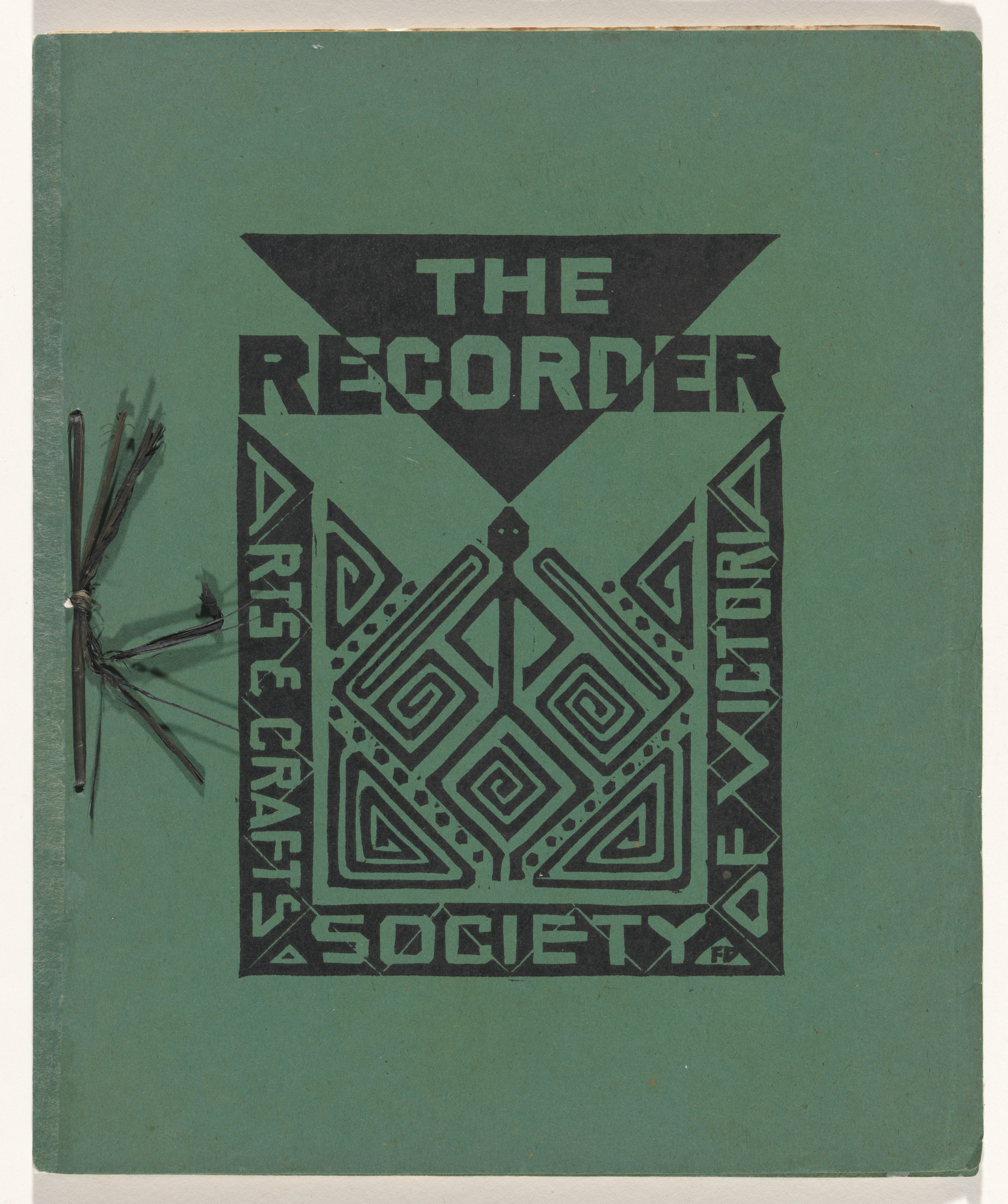
Frances Derham (1929) cover, The Recorder, publication of the Arts & Crafts Society of Victoria issued 1929, linocut. National Gallery of Australia

During her studies, Derham learned stencil cutting from Stanley Tompkins, which later influenced her printmaking, and in 1921 Derham was introduced to the linocut technique by her close friend Ethel Spowers and Eveline Syme. The arts and crafts movement in early 20th-century Australia witnessed a transformative period of exploration and appreciation for indigenous art and culture in which Derham played an active role, promoting Aboriginal motifs in design.

She was an associate of the Arts and Crafts Society of Victoria from 1915, remaining committed to it until 1940. The Society, established in 1908 at 323 Bourke Street, gained impetus from the 'First Australian Exhibition of Women's Work' in 1907. By the 1920s, Derham assumed a prominent role as the chief designer of the Society, and from 1928 to 1932, she served as its vice-president. For a 1931 exhibition held by the Society a modernist child's nursery was displayed, decorated with the work of members; a fairytale frieze by Jessie Traill and Ann Montgomery, plaques by Ola Cohn, and the Australian blackwood table and bed were designed by Derham. She also designed tables purposed for use by students which were illustrated in a 1939 article in The Australian home beautiful.

In March 1929, Derham wrote on 'A place for handicrafts in education,' and designed the cover of its journal, The Recorder, which featured Aboriginal motifs. Also that year, she presented a lecture titled 'The Interest of Aboriginal Art to the Modern Designer' to the Society in which she recounted her examination of Aboriginal material culture and its inspiration for her subsequent artistic expressions in linocuts of the 1920s to the 1940s which featured Aboriginal motifs. She twice visited the 'Aboriginal Art Exhibition' at the National Museum of Victoria in July 1929, and is believed to have inspired students' work based on Aboriginal motifs displayed at the Arts and Crafts Society's annual exhibition. Her interest paralleled Margaret Preston's advocating the use of Indigenous Australian motifs in contemporary art in her 1930 essay "The Application of Aboriginal Designs" in Art in Australia.

The adoption of First Nations' art forms and strong geometric forms was in sympathy with the Arts and Crafts Society's commitment to modernist design but without serious consideration of the ethics of the appropriation of Aboriginal motifs by Western artists. By the 1940s, there was an increasing acceptance of Aboriginal material culture as an art form alongside Western traditions. In 1941, Aboriginal works were included for the first time in a survey 'Art of Australia 1788-1941' that toured the United States and Canada.

== Legacy and recognition ==
Derham rarely exhibited her own art during her lifetime, though it continues to be included in surveys. In recognition of her contributions to art education and social welfare, Frances Derham was appointed an MBE in 1950. Her devotion to child art education was exemplified by her donation of around ten thousand pieces of child art to the National Gallery of Australia in 1976. A retrospective exhibition of Frances Derham's own work was held at the Jim Alexander Gallery in 1986. She died on November 5, 1987. Her personal papers are held in the University of Melbourne. Art historian Bernard Smith described her as a pioneer of creative art in education and "courageous and indefatigable."

== Publications ==
- Derham, Frances; Australian Early Childhood Association (2001). Art for the child under seven (7th ed.). Watson, A.C.T.: Australian Early Childhood Association. ISBN 978-1-875890-48-4. OCLC 155212882.

== Exhibitions of child art curated or organised by Derham ==
- 1938, June: Exhibition of Child Art from Many Countries. Art Gallery of South Australia and touring
- 1938, 22–30 November: Exhibition of Child Art from Many Countries, Athaneum Gallery. Arranged by Mrs A. P. [Frances] Derham and Miss Christine Heinig.
- 1939, July: Child art from many lands. Australian Art Gallery, Adelaide, S.A.
- 1939, November: Central Australian Exhibit of Aboriginal Work and Art at the Royal Show. Arranged by O. Gration and members of the Victorian Aborigines Group including Miss A. P. [Frances] Derham. Aboriginal art and craft including watercolours by Albert Namatjira were also shown at the Group's Depot.
- 1950, 26 August to 9 September: Drawings and paintings by the children of 22 countries. Cheshires Bookshop, Melbourne
  - 1953: Exhibition of Aboriginal Art and Craft, Melbourne University Gallery, Organized by National Union of Australian University Students.
- 1954: Commonwealth child art exhibition organised by the Commonwealth Foundation (Great Britain), and the British Memorial Foundation, Melbourne. Catalogue text by Frances Derham
- 1954: Exhibition of Art from Ernabel/a, Assembly Hall, Melbourne, November
- 1955: Second Exhibition of Aboriginal Art and Craft, Melbourne University Gallery, Organized by National Union of Australian University Students
- 1958: Exhibition of Aboriginal Art and Craft, Melbourne University Gallery, Organised by National Union of Australian University Students
- 1979, from 9 December: Art of the Child, 1930-1970, from the Australian National Gallery's Frances Derham Collection. The AME School, Weston, ACT

== Exhibitions of works by Derham ==
- 1978, 13 April – 5 May: A Survey of Australian Relief Prints 1900 - 1950. Deutscher Galleries, Victoria
- 1981: Melbourne woodcuts and linocuts of the 1920s and 1930s. Multi-artist travelling exhibition
- 1986: Frances Derham, Ethel Spowers and Clive Stephens. Jim Alexander Gallery, 13 Elmo Road, East Malvern
- 1986: Frances Derham MBE: a retrospective exhibition covering the period 1910 to 1985 and including works of George Bell, Danila Vassilieff, Geoff Jones, Ethel Spowers, Ludwig Hirschfeld-Mack. Jim Alexander Gallery, Victoria
- 1988, 5–26 March: Australian women printmakers Josef Lebovic Gallery, NSW
- 1995, from 8 March: A Century of Australian Women's Art (1880s-1990s). Angeloro Fine Art Galleries, Artarmon, NSW
- 1995, 16 February–13 March: In the Company of Women: 100 years of Australian women's art from the Cruthers collection, opened by Dr Liz Constable MLA, Member for Floreat, 15 February 1995. PICA (Perth Institute of Contemporary Arts), WA
- 1995, February–April: Women on Paper: from the Ballarat collection. Ballarat Fine Art Gallery, Ballarat, Vic.
- 2003, 10 September – 22 October: Frances Derham Retrospective Exhibition. The Lyceum Club, Melbourne

== Collections ==
- National Gallery of Australia, Australian Capital Territory
- National Gallery of Victoria
- Art Gallery of New South Wales

== Bibliography ==
- Alexander, Penelope; Derham, Frances; Lyceum Club, Melbourne (2003). Frances Derham in retrospect. St Kilda: Grey Thrush Publications. ISBN 978-0-9580016-2-5. OCLC 223797414.
- Piscitelli, Barbara (1993). "Frances Derham and the expressive arts: her life and legacy". Australian Journal of Early Childhood. 18 (1): 3–9.
