= Barkman =

Barkman is a surname. Notable people with the surname include:

- Frances Barkman (1885–1946), Jewish Australian schoolteacher and community worker
- Gerd Barkman, New Zealand sport shooter
- Jane Barkman (born 1951), American swimmer
- Jon Barkman (born 1979), Canadian ice hockey player
- Leonard Barkman (1920–1979), Canadian politician
- Ralph Barkman (1907–1998), American football player
