= Elsie Traill =

Australian philanthropist

Elsie Margaret Traill (1876 – 9 December 1946) was an Australian philanthropist and committee member, and sister of the painter and print maker Jessie Traill. Following a £5,000 donation to the University of Melbourne's Janet Clarke Hall, the E.M. Traill Wing of the college was named in her honour. Traill was also active in the establishment of the Janet Clarke Hall Committee, for which she served as chair, and was involved throughout her life with Trinity College, being the 35th women to attend the college and later becoming a member of the Trinity College Council. In addition to her involvement with the Lyceum Club, the Victoria League, and the Royal Victorian Institute for the Blind, Elsie Traill was also actively involved in the Australian Red Cross and established Melbourne's first Red Cross Shop, in Sandringham.
