= George Sweet =

English-born Australian geologist

George Sweet (c. 1844 – 1920) was an English-born Australian geologist, president of the Royal Society of Victoria in 1905.

Sweet investigated fossils in the Mansfield district for Frederick McCoy 1888–95, and was second-in-command to Sir Edgeworth David on the Funafuti expedition in 1897. He was a fellow of the Geological Society

Sweet's daughter, Georgina Sweet (1875–1946), became a zoologist and philanthropist.
