= Joshua Thomas Noble Anderson =

Civil engineer working in Australia and New Zealand

- Born: 1865; Ireland
- Died: 1949 (aged 83–84); Melbourne, Victoria
- Children: Alice Elizabeth Anderson
- Engineering career
- Discipline: civil engineer
- Projects: Morell Bridge Fyansford Bridge Wheelers Bridge, Victoria

Joshua Thomas Noble (Noble) Anderson (J T N Anderson) (1865–1949) was an engineer practising in Melbourne, Australia, and New Zealand during the difficult times in the Depressions of the 1890s and 1930s, but still practised innovative engineering in these periods.

== Early career and migration to Australia ==
Anderson, known commonly by his middle name Noble, was born in Ireland in 1865, and graduated in engineering and arts. Following short engineering engagements in Ireland, he came to Victoria in 1889, undertaking his first engineering in Victoria in connection with the Laanecoorie Weir. He then took up a lectureship in mechanical engineering at the University of Melbourne, where he met John Monash.

== Monash & Anderson ==
In 1894, Monash and Anderson set up a consulting partnership, which lasted from 1894 to 1902, designing and contracting engineering works. After a meeting with Frank Gummow of Sydney in 1897, Anderson negotiated an agreement for the firm to become the Victorian agents for reinforced concrete using the Monier patents and won several contracts for bridges using the technology and he and Monash concentrated on building concrete bridges.

== Move to New Zealand ==
Anderson moved to New Zealand in 1902 after the company failed financially. Anderson was appointed as engineer with the Dunedin (New Zealand) Drainage Board in 1902 and continued to 1906. He then returned to Victoria to take up a post as shire engineer and engineering consultant for several local councils in different parts of Victoria. In the 1920s he acted as engineering consultant to Walter Burley Griffin, on the design of the Cotter Dam and water supply system for the new capital at Canberra. Later he was consulting engineer to the city of Richmond. He joined the Victorian Institute of Engineers in 1890, and was president 1900–2 and in 1919. He joined the IEAust as a corporate member in 1926.

== Personal life ==
He married Ellen Mary White-Spunner and they had six children, including Alice Elizabeth Foley Anderson (1897–1926), businesswoman and owner of the first all-women garage workshop in Australia, and Frances Alexandra (Frankie) Derham (1894–1987), artist and art educator.

He died in 1949.
