= Ada Evans =

Australian lawyer (1872–1947)

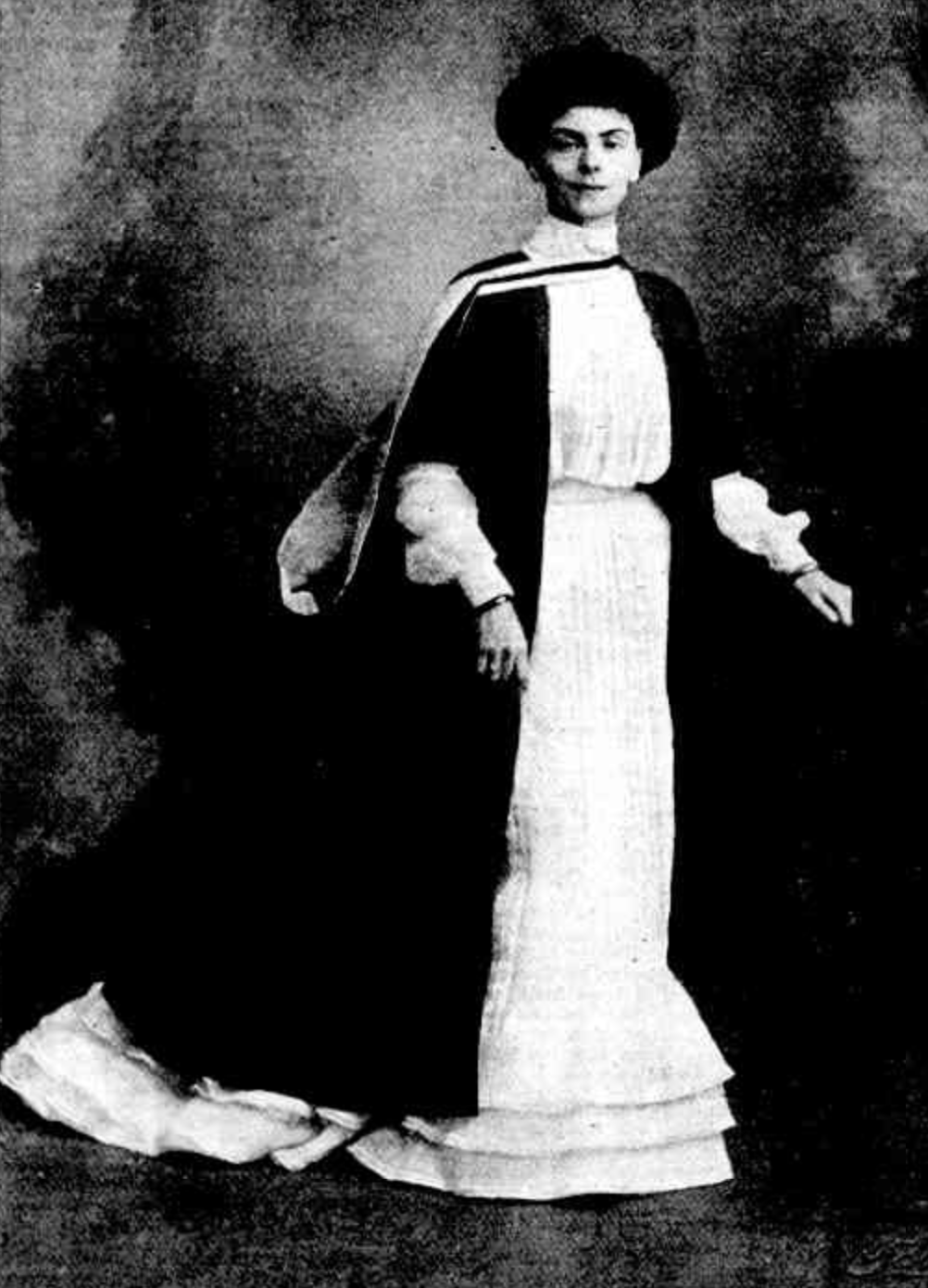
- Ada Evans, first Australian female law graduate, 1902
- Born: Ada Emily Evans; 17 May 1872; Wanstead, England
- Died: 27 December 1947 (aged 75); Bowral, New South Wales
- Monuments: Ada Evans Chambers
- Education: University of Sydney

Ada Emily Evans (17 May 1872 – 27 December 1947), was an Australian lawyer and the first female law graduate in Australia.

== Early life ==
Evans was born in Wanstead, England (then a town in Essex county, now a north-eastern suburb of London), the daughter of architect Henry Evans and his wife Louisa, who came from a family of lawyers. She attended school in the London suburb of Woodford, before her family moved to Sydney, New South Wales, Australia in 1883. There she attended Sydney Girls High School, and began her tertiary education at the University of Sydney, graduating with a Bachelor of Arts degree in 1895. Following graduation, she intended to establish a school with her sister in the inner-western suburb of Summer Hill, but abandoned the project after a period of illness.

== Legal career ==
Later, encouraged by her mother Louisa, Evans enrolled again at the University of Sydney in 1899, this time in the Sydney Law School. Although the Dean of the school at the time, Pitt Cobbett, would by all accounts never have permitted a woman to enrol, he was absent overseas and Evans was able to enter the school. On his return, he declared to Evans "that she did not have the physique for law and would find medicine more suitable".

The rules of practice in force in New South Wales at the time did not comprehend female lawyers, and there was no precedent of women becoming lawyers; when Evans attempted to register as a student-at-law with the Supreme Court of New South Wales, her application was rejected. Although the rules of practice legislation did not actually disqualify women from becoming lawyers, the common law at the time held that unless legislation specifically conferred rights or privileges on women, it did not apply to them, for women were not included in the definition of persons. Despite these setbacks, Evans persisted with her studies, and on 26 December 1902 graduated with a Bachelor of Laws degree, the first woman in Australia to do so.

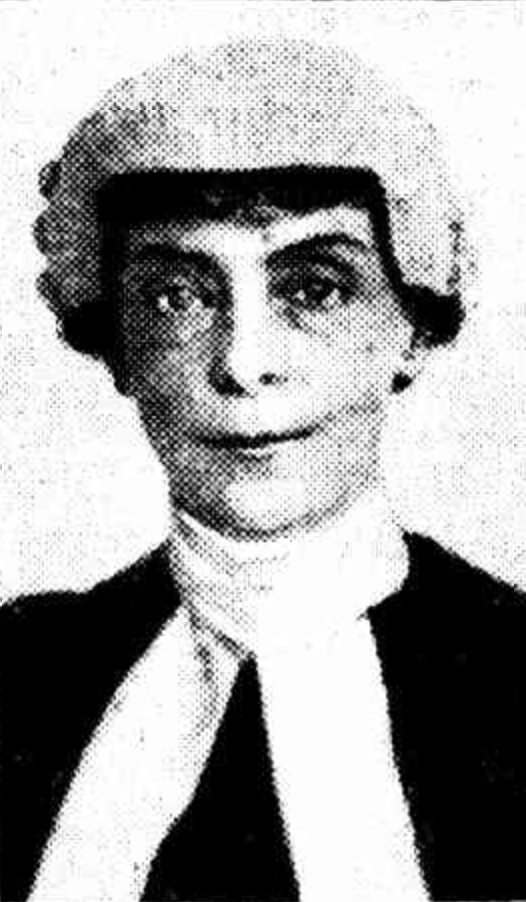
Ada Evans, admitted to the Bar in NSW, May 1921

=== Admission to New South Wales Bar Association ===
After graduating, Evans applied for admission to the New South Wales Bar to practise as a barrister, but again her application was rejected on the basis of her sex. She was similarly prevented from being admitted to the English Bar. Evans and her supporters in women's organisations commenced a campaign for the laws to be changed to specifically allow women to practise. Such laws were enacted in other Australian states to specifically allow the admission of women, and in 1905 Flos Greig became the first female barrister in Australia, when she was admitted to the Victorian Bar (having become the first Victorian female law graduate in 1903). At this time, Evans also edited a weekly women's page in the Australian Star newspaper, her work incorporating "an underlying theme that truth and kindness were essential ingredients for human happiness."

The Parliament of New South Wales finally altered the law to enable women to practise law, with the passage of the Women's Legal Status Act 1918 late in 1918. Evans registered as a student-at-law in May 1919 and on 12 May 1921, after the requisite two years as a student, became the first woman to be admitted to the New South Wales Bar. However, although she was offered work as a barrister immediately, she declined to practise, citing her family commitments and the passage of time since her graduation and saying that she didn't want "women's standing in the profession to be undermined by a show of incompetence".

== Later life ==
In 1909, Evans and her brother, William Robert Evans (1864–1944), moved to the town of Bowral in the New South Wales Southern Highlands, where they bought a six hectare farming property called Kurkulla.

== Death ==
She died at her Bowral residence on 27 December 1947, aged 75. She was cremated in Sydney.

== Legacy ==
=== Ada Evans Chambers ===
In 1998, Sydney barrister Michael Maxwell opened a new barristers chambers in downtown Sydney NSW, named in honour of Ada Evans. The chambers was officially opened on 20 November 1998 by the Honourable Justice Mary Gaudron of the High Court of Australia. The opening was attended by Katherine Morgan (née Evans), solicitor who was admitted in 1989. She is the first relative of Ada Evans to become a lawyer and is Ada's cousin's great granddaughter. Mrs Morgan presented the Chambers with a copy of Ada Evans' graduation photograph from the University of Sydney.

Ada Evans Chambers continues to operate today with a membership of 30 barristers with founding member Michael Maxwell still on the floor.
