= Alice Elizabeth Anderson =

Australian businesswoman (1897–1926)

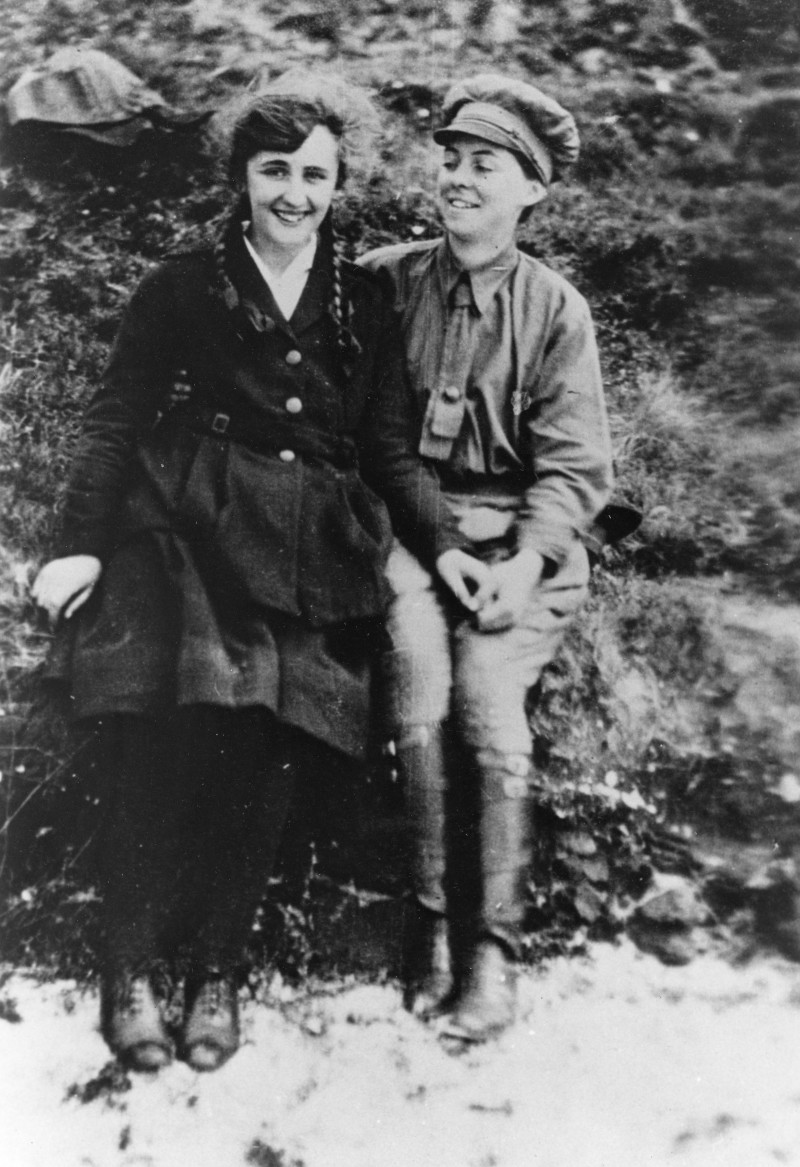
- Alice Elizabeth Anderson (right)
- Born: Alecia Elizabeth Foley Anderson; 8 June 1897; Melbourne, Australia
- Died: 17 September 1926 (aged 29); Kew, Melbourne, Australia
- Cause of death: Gunshot
- Occupations: Businesswoman, garage proprietor, designer, industrial/product designer, and mechanic
- Years active: 1919–1926
- Known for: First all-women garage proprietor in Australia
- Father: Joshua Thomas Noble Anderson

Alice Elizabeth Anderson (8 June 1897 – 17 September 1926) was an Australian businesswoman, garage proprietor, designer, industrial/product designer, and mechanic. Anderson was the owner of the first all-women garage workshop in Australia.

== Life and career ==
Alice Anderson was born Mary Elizabeth Foley Anderson in Melbourne, Australia on 8 June 1897, to Irish-born couple Joshua Thomas Noble Anderson and Ellen Mary (née White-Spunner). She was the third of five children in the family, and her sisters were Joan, artist and educator Frances Derham, and Claire, who became the first female engineering student at the University of Melbourne. Her only brother Stewart drowned in 1913.

She grew up in a bush house in Narbethong, a small town in the rural suburbs of Melbourne, where she learned to hunt, fish, horse ride, and had her first contact with driving. From 1913 to 1914, Anderson attended the Melbourne Church of England Girls' Grammar School, however financial struggles forced her to abandon schooling after five terms. In 1915, she began taking private lessons in bookkeeping, French, and history with Jessie Webb.

Anderson's interest in motor vehicles was sparked in her teens; some writers say Anderson's first contact with vehicles happened in the local co-operative bus service, others say she worked in her father's motoring business as a secretary and the staff taught her to drive. On her 18th birthday, Anderson's father gifted her a Hupmobile decorated with their family crest and the motto, "We Stoop Not."

At the age of 18, Anderson began working part-time as a clerical worker, and made extra money by shuttling weekend tour groups to the Dandenong Ranges. By the age of 21, she settled in Kew and became a full-time worker for her tourism business. A year later, she acquired a block in Cotham Road, constructed a brick garage, and founded the Alice Anderson Motor Service enterprise. Her endeavours were inspired by Joe Carstairs, a British Standard Oil heiress who started an all-woman garage in London.

== Alice Anderson Motor Service ==
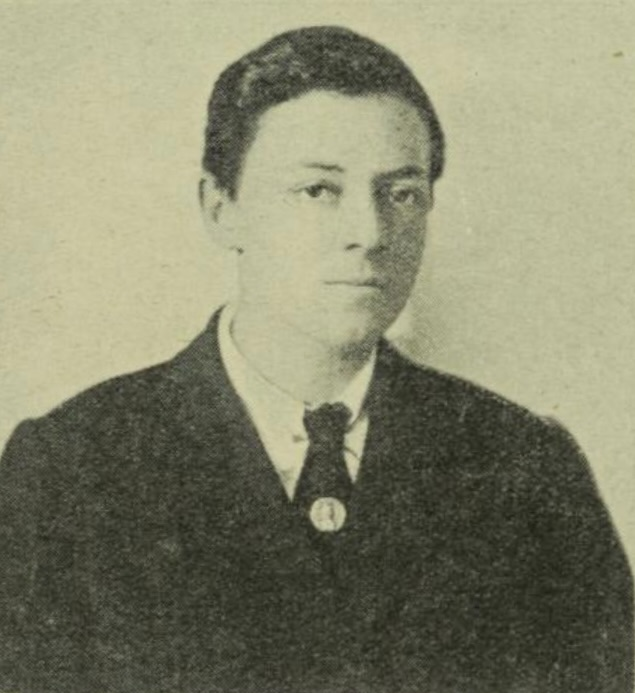
Alice Elizabeth Anderson in 1925

Inaugurated in 1919, Alice Anderson Motor Service was the first all-women garage workshop in Australia. The opening party for the garage was attended by Nellie Melba, Robert Menzies, and students from the University of Melbourne. The services offered included vehicle repair, chauffeuring with garage-owned cars, interstate touring trips, driving classes, and petrol stations. In addition, women could take educational programs on engine technology, and participate in a mechanics apprenticeship. Due to Anderson's reputation for caring and passion, mothers from all across Australia would send their daughters to the garage to learn to drive. By 1925, the garage was so popular that 50 women applied for the apprenticeship program, the crew grew to 9 members, and the car fleet grew to 5 vehicles. She trained more than thirty young female chauffeurs. Notable alum includes popular motorist, Jean Beatson.

The garage continued to operate after Anderson's death, with Ethel Bage managing the business until at least 1935, and May Rooney taking over in 1937. Driving instruction became the primary focus of the business, and the Alice Anderson Motor School operating until at least 1954.

== Death ==
On 7 September 1926, Anderson was found dead in her workshop in Kew after a day of work. The coroner's report suggested that she accidentally shot herself while cleaning two of her guns, and family and friends dismissed the possibility of suicide.

The news stated the following day: "Probably no woman in Melbourne was better known. She pioneered the way to motor garages for women, and made a greater success of it than most men could."

Anderson was buried in the Boroondara Cemetery following a graveside service. Young women who worked in her garage acted as pallbearers.

== Legacy ==
According to historian Loretta Smith, Anderson "was a woman of 'rare achievement' who excelled as a motoring entrepreneur and inventor." Her best known invention is a type of creeper, the ‘Anderson get out and under board’, a board on castor-wheels for use when working under a car. Anderson first exhibited the invention in 1918, at the Royal Agricultural Show, but failed to file a patent; in 1920, an identical "automobile creeper" was patented.

Anderson was involved with several social clubs and associations. Along with Annie Watson Lister, she was a founder and vice-president of The Women's Automobile Club of Australia. She was also a member of The Lyceum Club, a club for prominent and influential women in the fields of arts, sciences, and contemporary issues. As an advocate for women in garage work, and female independence, she published press articles and contributed to motoring columns in Woman's World.

In 2016, Alice's Garage, a social enterprise, was founded upon Anderson's ideals of women empowerment. Its mission is "to address the inequalities LGBTI Elders face related to ageism and the legacies of our LGBTIphobic histories."

Since 2017, "Alice Anderson's Motor Service" is an exhibition in the National Motor Museum of Australia. In 2018, the project won the "Interpretation Australia, Runners-up – 2018 Awards of Excellence."

In March 2020, Anderson was inducted into the Victorian Honour Roll of Women following nomination by members of the Friends of Boroondara (Kew) cemetery.

In 2023, Garage Girls, a stage performance based on the life of Anderson and the women she employed, had a season at La Mama Theatre in Melbourne. The performance was devised by Three Birds Theatre and The Shift Theatre.
