= Mary Sophia Alston =

Australian philanthropist (1856–1932)

Mary Alston
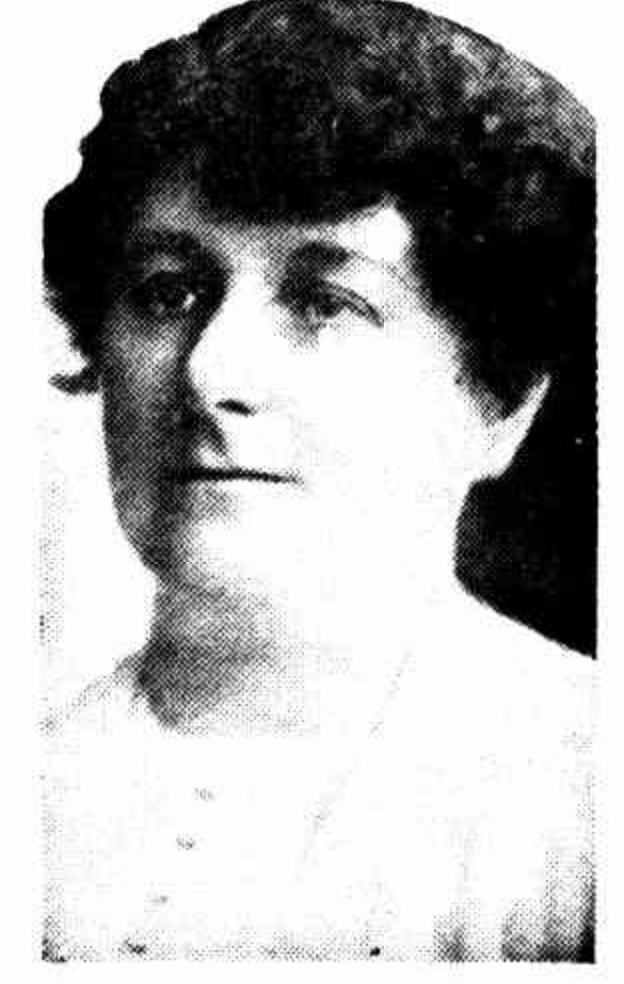
- Born: Mary Sophia O'Sullivan c. 1856; Warrnambool, Colony of Victoria
- Died: 13 December 1932 (aged c. 76); Melbourne, Victoria, Australia
- Burial place: Melbourne General Cemetery, Victoria
- Other names: Mrs James Alston
- Occupation: Philanthropist
- Spouse: James Alston
- Children: 3 daughters and 3 sons

Mary Sophia Alston (née O'Sullivan; c. 1856 – 13 December 1932) was an Australian philanthropist. She was patron of the central executive of St Vincent's Hospital, Melbourne and president of the Royal Women's Hospital.

Her husband, James Alston, was an innovator and entrepreneur of windmills.

== Early life ==
Alston was born around 1856, in Warrnambool, to J. J. O'Sullivan and his wife, Anne, as one of four children to the couple. After marrying James Alston she moved to Majella on St Kilda Road, Melbourne and gave birth to three sons and three daughters. She also had a property at which she would regularly spend time, "Montalto", in Danks St, Port Melbourne. She would regularly holiday at her summer residence at the seaside town of Mount Martha.

== Charitable works ==
Over the years she gave money generously to various charities, with one paper estimating at her death that she "distributed thousands of pounds in five and ten-guinea subscriptions", which they reported she did in "stealth" as she preferred to remain in the background. She was an extremely active charity worker, involved in 20 welfare committees in Melbourne towards the end of her life. During World War I, she was vice-president of the Victorian Red Cross Society. She participated in a long list of organisations: she was president of the St Vincent's Hospital Auxiliary, taking over from Mrs N. R. Napier in 1928, and later was to resign but remain on as the vice-president; patroness of the central executive of St Vincent's Hospital; president of the Royal Women's Hospital until the beginning of her illness in August 1932; a vice-president of the Victoria League; honorary member of the Ladies Aid Association of the Homeopathic Hospital; president of the Victorian Association of Creches until June 1929; and president of the Loreto Free Kindergarten. Her other concerns included the Queen Victoria and Alfred hospitals, the Society for the Prevention of Cruelty to Children, the City Newsboys' Society, The Women's Orchestral Association, the Victoria Bush Nurses Association, and she was a member of the Lyceum Club.

== Death and legacy ==
After an illness lasting four months she died on 13 December 1932 at Majella; the primary residence she lived in since she had arrived in Melbourne. A Requiem Mass was held for her at St Patrick's Cathedral and she was buried at Melbourne General Cemetery. At time of her death she had left real estate valued at £18,425 and personal properly valued at £9,676. In her will she bequeathed property to her children, gifts to a brother, sisters, and £100 each to the St Vincent de Paul's Orphanage for Boys, St. Vincent's and Women's Hospitals, and the St Vincent de Paul's Orphanage for Girls. After her death, a memorial was erected at the Women's Hospital in her honour for services to the hospital. The Loreto Free Kindergarten dedicated "The Mary Alston Room", where the Loreto Kindergarten committee met and children attended for a "quiet hour", in her honour. St Vincent's Hospital also endowed the Mary Alston bed in recognition of her service.
