= Kathleen Fitzpatrick (Australian academic) =

Australian academic and historian

Kathleen Fitzpatrick AO FAHA
- Portrait of Fitzpatrick by Helmut Newton, c. 1953–54.
- Born: Kathleen Elizabeth Pitt; 7 September 1905; Omeo, Victoria
- Died: 27 August 1990 (aged 84); Melbourne, Victoria
- Education: Presentation Convent; Lauriston Girls School; Somerville College, Oxford
- Occupations: Academic, historian
- Employer: University of Melbourne

Kathleen Elizabeth Fitzpatrick AO FAHA (7 September 1905 – 27 August 1990) was an Australian academic and historian.

== Biography ==
Fitzpatrick (born Kathleen Elizabeth Pitt) was born in the town of Omeo, Victoria in 1905. She was educated at Loreto Convent in South Melbourne and Portland, Presentation Convent in Windsor, and Lauriston Girls' School in Armadale. From there, Fitzpatrick entered the University of Melbourne, enrolling in English, following on from her love of literature in high school. However, the honours program in English did not appeal to her, so she enrolled also in history, studying under Ernest Scott; this second subject would become her favourite after a holiday to Tasmania at the end of her first year, when she was inspired by a visit to the ruins of Port Arthur.

From 1925, she was a member of the Lyceum Club. She graduated from Melbourne with a Bachelor of Arts (Honours) in 1926, and with financial support from her parents, obtained another Bachelor of Arts at Somerville College, Oxford University in 1928, completing the three-year degree in two years.

On her return to Australia in 1929, Fitzpatrick was employed as a temporary lecturer at the University of Sydney, teaching history. The following year she became a tutor in English at her alma mater, a position she held until 28 August 1932, when she married journalist Brian Fitzpatrick and was consequently forced to leave her job, as was required of all female academics at the time.

After leaving Melbourne, Fitzpatrick graduated with a Masters of Arts from Oxford in 1933. In 1935 she and her husband separated; she applied to the University of Melbourne for a job, but was rebuffed, the Appointments Board advising her that women were only wanted for secretarial work. Fitzpatrick studied shorthand and typing at the Melbourne Technical School (now RMIT University) in 1936, and indeed became a teacher there the following year, teaching shorthand and commercial English.

By 1937 she was tutoring English at the University of Melbourne, when a new lectureship in the Department of History was advertised; having been advised by the vice-chancellor Raymond Priestley to acquaint herself with the new professor of history Max Crawford, which she did, with the support of a letter of introduction from her former teacher Scott. Crawford later recalled that he "could see at once that Ernest Scott had sent [him] a winner", and supported Fitzpatrick for the position over a strong field of other candidates, and she was appointed to the lectureship late in 1937, to commence in 1938. The appointment increased the full-time staff in the department from two (Crawford and Jessie Webb) to three, and for a while the department was the first in the University with a majority of female staff.

Fitzpatrick taught first-year British history herself, to both the regular and honours students, and assisted with later-year subjects, sharing the entire teaching duties of the department with Webb whenever Crawford was absent. Her course in British history was widely varied, and was distinctive among contemporary courses elsewhere in the world for teaching British social, cultural and economic history in conjunction with the traditional political and religious subject matter. She also taught a second-year honours level subject on the French Revolution up until the Second World War. Fitzpatrick's lectures were well regarded amongst her students; Geoffrey Serle described them in a eulogy for Fitzpatrick as "set-piece performances, every word considered and counting... in that individual clear voice, cool and rational, but imbued with passion... Some students were known to return for the evening repeat."

Her first area of research, following on from her early interest in Port Arthur, was the colonial-era history of Van Diemen's Land, and she produced several publications on this subject. Outside of her academic work, Fitzpatrick gave a number of radio talks for adult education programs through the 1940s, covering a variety of history topics. During the war, Fitzpatrick negotiated with employers on behalf of female university students who had been drafted to work under the Manpower regime, in her role as President of the Council for Women in War Work.

In 1942 Fitzpatrick was promoted to senior lecturer, and in 1948 became an associate professor. At the time, she was only the third woman to have been appointed associate professor at the University, and the first in Australia outside the natural sciences.

Fitzpatrick's first book, Sir John Franklin in Tasmania, 1837–1843, was published in 1949. Shortly after this she commenced work on a biography of Charles La Trobe, but it was never published. Her second book, Australian Explorers, was a selection of writings from early explorers, commissioned for Oxford University Press and published in 1958; it would become a standard text for Australian history courses. In addition to this historical writing, she also reviewed new books in British and colonial history, and contributed literary reviews and criticism to Southerly and Meanjin.

When a second chair in history was created in 1955, Fitzpatrick was Crawford's first choice for the position, but she declined to apply for it; John La Nauze was appointed instead. Fitzpatrick later wrote that she did not think the quality of her original scholarship qualified her for a chair. Fitzpatrick continued to teach the compulsory first-year British history course solo until a second lecturer was appointed in 1959, and the history class – which by that time comprised more than five hundred students – was divided in two. She was a founding member of the Australian Humanities Research Council in 1956 (the only woman among them), and later a founding fellow of its successor body, the Australian Academy of the Humanities.

Fitzpatrick retired from teaching in 1962. In 1964 she was a member of the Third University Committee, which advised the Government of Victoria on the establishment of Melbourne's third university, La Trobe University; it was Fitzpatrick who suggested that it be named after Charles La Trobe. She continued to write in her retirement, preparing a large work on the American novelist Henry James; she failed to find a publisher however. In 1975 she authored a commissioned history of Presbyterian Ladies' College, and in 1983 published Solid Bluestone Foundations, part memoir and part social history, which was warmly received by critics. In retirement, Fitzpartrick accumulated significant wealth generated, in the main, from the financial success of her father, who after a distinguished civil service career culminating as Head of Treasury, Victoria, was recruited to stockbroking by Sir Ian Potter.

== Awards, honours and legacy ==
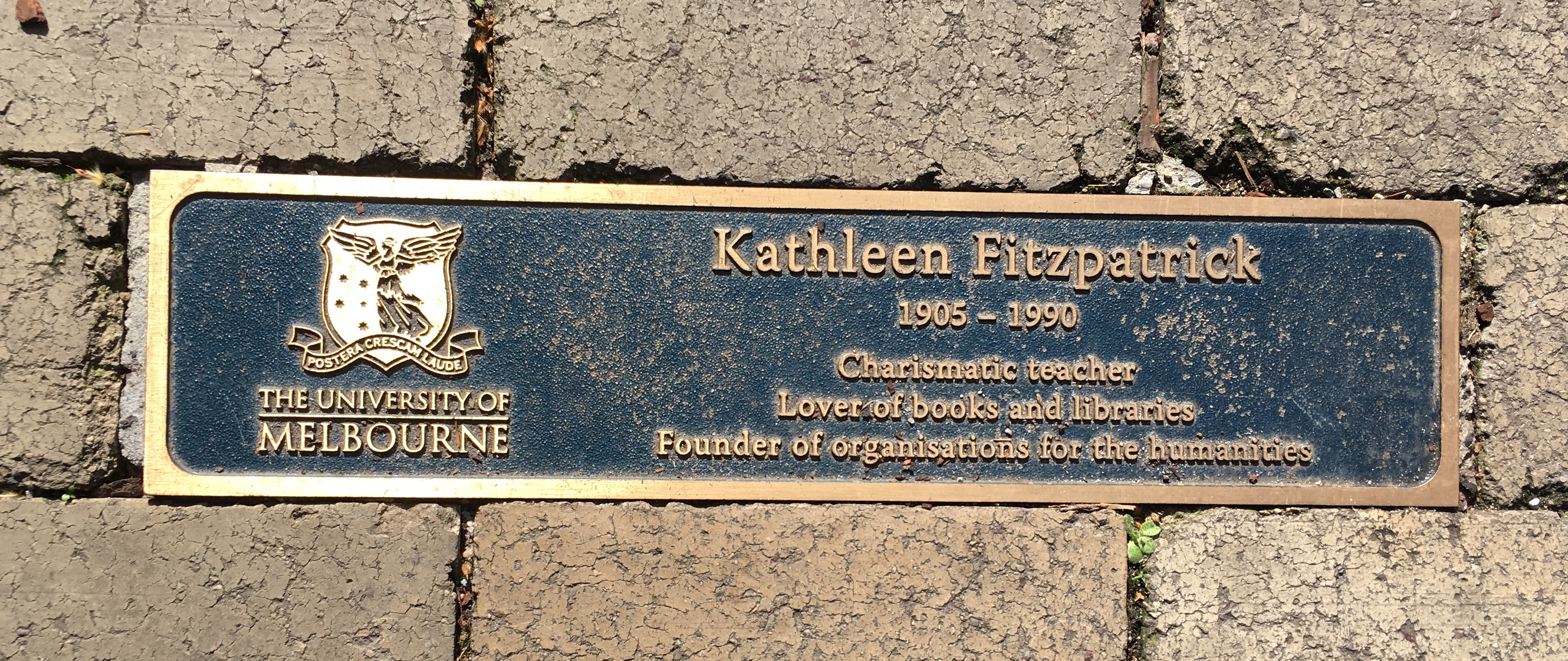
Bronze plaque on Professors Walk at Parkville campus

In 1983 Fitzpatrick was awarded an honorary Doctorate of Laws by the University of Melbourne, and in 1989 she was appointed an Officer of the Order of Australia (AO) for her services to education, particularly in the field of history.

She was awarded a University of Melbourne Award, which "recognises those individuals who have made an outstanding and enduring contribution to the University and its scholarly community". A bronze plaque honouring her is on the wall along the Professors' Walk at the Parkville campus of the University.

Fitzpatrick died in 1990. From her estate she bequeathed a fund to the University of Melbourne for the purchase of history books for the library; she dedicated it in the name of her father, Henry Pitt, "in gratitude for allowing her the university education of which he had been deprived." The University has named its largest theatre in her honour, in addition to the ARC Kathleen Fitzpatrick Australian Laureate Fellowship, and the Kathleen Fitzpatrick Lecture.
