= Flos Greig =

Australian lawyer (1880–1958)

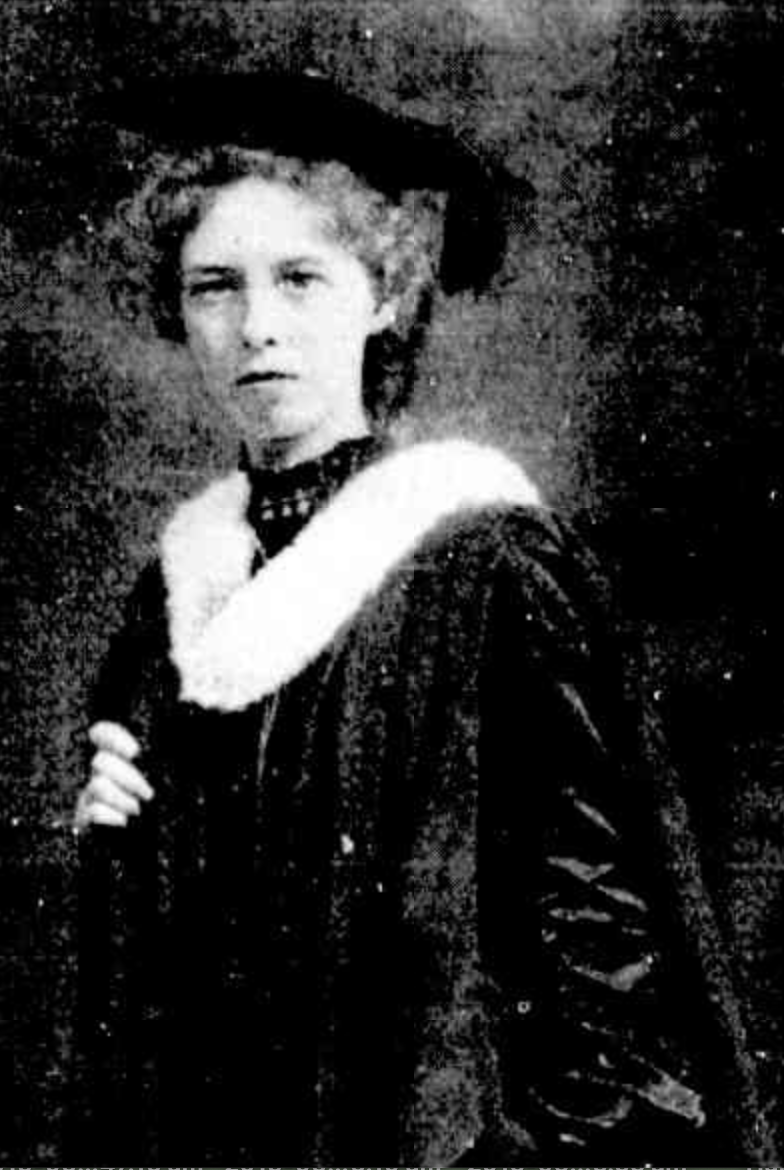
- Grata Flos Greig, LL.B. on her graduation day
- Born: Grata Flos Matilda Greig; 7 November 1880; Broughty Ferry, Scotland
- Died: 31 December 1958 (aged 78); Moorabbin, Victoria, Australia
- Occupations: barrister and solicitor

Grata Flos Matilda Greig (7 November 1880 – 31 December 1958), Scottish-born Australian lawyer, was the first woman to be admitted to practise as a barrister and solicitor in Australia.

== Early life and education ==
Grata Flos Matilda Greig (known as Flos) was born in Broughty Ferry, Scotland on 7 November 1880, one of eight children of textile merchant and higher education advocate Robert Greig, and his wife Jane Stocks (née Macfarlane) (1848-1902). She had five sisters and three brothers - Jane Stocks (1872-1939), Janet Lindsay (1874-1950), Clara Puella (1877-1957), James Arthur (1882-1935), Ernest Howard (1884-1972), Hector Maximus (1887-1979) and Stella Fida (1889-1913).

Flos Greig attended school in Dundee, Scotland, before the family moved to Melbourne, Victoria, Australia landing on 20 April 1889, after sailing on the Parramatta.

From 1894 she attended the Presbyterian Ladies' College, Melbourne, but decided to leave school after 1896 and enrolled in an arts/law degree at the University of Melbourne in 1897, the first woman to enter the Faculty of Law, and indeed the first to enter any law school in Australia. Although the male students at the Law school were initially opposed to her studying there, they voted at the end of Greig's first year that women ought to be allowed to practise law.

== Career ==
Greig completed her Bachelor of Arts degree in 1900 (although she did not formally graduate until 1904), and on 28 March 1903, graduated with her Bachelor of Laws degree, the first woman in Victoria to do so, and only the second in the country, after Ada Evans who graduated the previous year from the University of Sydney. Greig received third-class honours for her degree, placing her second in her year level.

The rules of practice in force at the time did not comprehend female lawyers, and there was no precedent of women becoming lawyers, in any of the Australian states. Evans had been denied admission to the New South Wales Bar after she graduated on the basis of her sex, forcing her to campaign for the rules of practice legislation to be changed to specifically allow women. Greig and her supporters had already conducted a campaign in Victoria. In 1903 the Women’s Disabilities Removal Act 1903, also called the "Flos Greig Enabling Act", was passed to allow women to practice law in Victoria.

Greig completed her articles of clerkship, and on 1 August 1905 became the first woman admitted to legal practice in Australia. A short time later, she was the first woman admitted to the Law Institute of Victoria. She commenced work as a self-employed solicitor in Melbourne. One of her first jobs was for the Woman's Christian Temperance Union of Victoria, drafting their proposed amendments to the Children's Court Act 1906 (Vic), the legislation which established the Children's Court of Victoria.

Greig later worked as an employee of Cornwall Stodart, a firm of solicitors in Melbourne. In about 1930, Greig moved to the town of Wangaratta in north-east Victoria, where she worked in a firm of solicitors led by Paul McSwiney. During this time she toured the countryside around Wangaratta promoting adult and tertiary education. Greig retired in 1942, and moved to Rosebud on the Mornington Peninsula. Greig lived in Rosebud until her death in 1958 in Moorabbin, aged 78.

She was posthumously inducted onto the Victorian Honour Roll of Women in 2001.

== Family ==
Greig had four sisters and three brothers. While two of her brothers followed her father into the family textile business, the women of the family blazed their own trails. Sisters Jane and Janet were two of the first women to study medicine in Australia, at the University of Melbourne, Jane Stocks Greig a pioneer in public health and Janet Greig the first anaesthetist in Victoria. Another sister, Clara, founded a coaching school for university students. The youngest sister, Stella, followed Flos into law, graduating from the University of Melbourne with a Bachelor of Laws degree on 8 April 1911. Stella died of tuberculosis less than two years later, aged 24.

== See also ==
- First women lawyers around the world
