= Gwynneth Flower =

Gwynneth Flower is a former chair of the National Meteorological Programme, a position she held until 2007.

Flower is also a director of 2change Ltd, a management advisory business. Additionally, she has an interim management role in support of the Ministry of Defence (United Kingdom) developing a more commercial approach to business.

In 1991 Flower set up CENTEC, the largest of the country's Training and Enterprise Councils, and was managing director of Action 2000, which was responsible to the prime minister for ensuring that the UK economy did not suffer material disruption as a result of the so-called Millennium bug.

She is Honorary Treasurer and Member of Council of the Royal Institution of Great Britain and a director and trustee of two national charities. She was a non-executive director of Ordnance Survey to 2002 when her term expired.

She holds honorary doctorates from the Open University and from De Montfort University.
