= Muriel Stott =

Australian architect

- Born: Muriel Millicent Stott; 1889; Melbourne, Victoria, Australia
- Died: 1985 (aged 95–96); Johannesburg, South Africa
- Other names: Muriel Leech, Muriel Davies
- Occupation: architect
- Years active: 1916–1930
- Known for: Little Milton

Muriel Stott (1889–1985) was probably the first woman with her own architectural firm in Australia, opening it in 1917. Between 1916 and 1930, she designed houses in Victoria and the surrounding area. Her most noted design is a house built for the Moran family in 1926 called "Little Milton".

== Biography ==
Muriel Millicent Stott was born in 1889 in Melbourne, Victoria, Australia to Annie (née Twyford) and Leonard Sydney Stott She began her training at the firm of Fisher and Bradshaw and completed her articles (certification requirements) in 1916. She spent the following year in the employ of J. J. Meagher, during which time she built 2 to 3 commissions of her own. One was a brick house on High Street in East Malvern and another brick home in Malvern. In 1917 she renovated a house in Malvern and designed a timber bungalow located in Castlemaine. In 1917, she opened her own practice, probably becoming the first woman with her own architectural firm in Australia.

Stott was hired in 1918 to design a timber residence in Olinda on Coonara Street called Rainbow End. The house was built for friends of her family, the Morans, who would later have her build her most noted commission. In 1919 after finishing Rainbow End, Stott built a brick home in Hawthorn. In 1920, she made a trip with her father to the United States and upon their return, built a home in 1921 at the corner of High Street and Malvern Road in East Malvern.

In 1923, Stott registered as an architect and in 1926 built another dwelling for the Moran family. The house, known as Little Milton is on Albany Road in Toorak. She built the property in conjunction with Stephenson & Meldrum and when completed, the home was featured in Australian Home Beautiful. The house may be named after Little Milton in Oxfordshire, and has some similarities to the manor house in Great Milton. The design features a two-story brick façade topped with a pitched gable roof tiled in terra cotta. The entryway is accessed through a Tudor arch, leading into a grand hallway with parquet flooring. The lower floor has a large living room, dining room, galley kitchen and billiard room and the upper floor contains five bedrooms and baths. The gardens were designed by landscape architect Edna Walling. On 20 August 1998 the property was listed in the Victorian Heritage Register.

Little Milton may have been her last commission, as though still advertising as an architect, Stott never joined the Victorian Institute of Architects, and no commissions have been identified after 1926. In 1931, she went to Europe and met Desmond Leech, whom she married in 1932. Leech was a mining engineer from Johannesburg, South Africa and in 1933 she moved with him there. She designed her home at 39 Currie Street, Oaklands, Johannesburg, which was her last known design. Leech died in 1946 and Stott subsequently married James Davies, an Englishman, in 1955. She died in South Africa in 1985.
