= Frances Barkman =

Australian school teacher and charity worker

- Born: March 1885; Kyev, Russian Empire
- Died: 28 October 1946 (aged 61); Fitzroy, Victoria, Australia
- Occupation: schoolteacher (French language)
- Years active: 1910-1946
- Known for: assisting Jewish refugees in WWII

Frances Barkman (March 1885 - 28 September 1946) was a Jewish Australian schoolteacher and community worker. Born in Kiev, in the Russian Empire, she emigrated to Australia in 1891, with her parents, who were fleeing the pogroms. She was raised in Melbourne, and became a French language teacher at the Melbourne Continuation School, and later the MacRobertson Girls High School. Outside of teaching, she was active in charity work with the Victorian branch of the Australian Jewish Welfare Society. During World War II, she played a vital role in providing assistance to Jewish refugees arriving in Melbourne, particularly children. She led efforts to establish a children's home for orphans and unaccompanied refugee children, which was renamed the Frances Barkman Home after her death.

== Early life ==
Frances Barkman was born in Kiev in the Russian Empire in March 1885. Her parents were Joseph and Anna Barkman, a Jewish couple who later fled Kiev to escape the pogroms, a wave of violence perpetrated against Jews in the Russia empire in the 1890s. They arrived in Melbourne in 1891, where Joseph Barkman found a position teaching Hebrew at Ormond College, which was non-sectarian in its admissions, and open to students from all religions.

For secondary education, Barkman attended the Rathdowne Street State school, in the Melbourne suburb of Carlton, Victoria. She then decided to pursue teaching as a career, one of the few professions open to women at the time. She attended the Training Institute, later renamed the Melbourne Teachers College. After completing her studies, she began teaching in the Victorian Education Department. While teaching, she continued her education, earning a Diploma of Education from the University of Melbourne in 1905. In 1912, she completed a Bachelor of Arts, also at the University of Melbourne.

== Career ==
=== Teaching ===
Barkman's teaching career began in suburban state (or public) schools. In 1911, she began teaching French at the public high school in Melbourne, known then as the Continuation School. The school was composed of departments for boys and girls; the boys high school was relocated in 1927, and the girls high school was moved in 1931, and renamed the MacRobertson Girls' High School. Barkman taught at the Continuation School and then at the MacRobertson school, until her sudden death in 1947. In addition to teaching French, Barkman also produced numerous plays for the high school students, as well as for the Lyceum Club outside of school.

Barkman's dedication to promoting French language and culture was recognized by the French government, which bestowed two awards on her in the 1930s. She also sat on the University French Standing Committee, served as an examiner in French for the university public examinations, and was an active member of the Victorian Alliance Française. During World War II, she served as the inaugural president for the women's auxiliary within the Australian Free France movement, and oversaw war relief efforts at her school.

=== Community volunteer work ===
Outside of her professional life, Barkman was very active as a volunteer in charitable works through Jewish agencies. She was the honorary secretary of the Victorian branch of the Australian Jewish Welfare Society, and took a leadership role in the organization's efforts to help refugees from Europe who arrived in Victoria. In her obituary in the Australian Jewish Herald, it was noted that Barkman had organized concerts for refugees during the war because they were not able to listen to music on the radio, due to restrictions on the use of "wireless sets".

Barkman was particularly concerned for the welfare of refugee children, and at her initiative, in 1939 the Australian Jewish Welfare Society petitioned the Australian government during World War II to issue visas for unaccompanied Jewish minors fleeing the Holocaust. The government agreed to allocate 250 visas a year for unaccompanied children as part of the overall three-years total for Jewish visas, which they capped at 15,000. To provide support and housing for these children, Barkman led efforts to establish a home for refugee children at Larino, an estate and mansion in Balwyn. The home opened in 1939, under the management of the Victorian branch of the Australian Jewish Welfare Society, and continued as an orphanage until 1964.

== Death and legacy ==
After battling cancer, Barkman died in hospital on 28 September 1946. Her memorial service was held at St. Kilda's synagogue. In her will, she left money for a scholarship fund to assist students in the Jewish Refugee Children's Home; the fund was named the Frances Barkman Memorial Fund. It provided financial support for a students who would otherwise not have the means to pay for university courses. Barkman also left money to the University of Melbourne and the Australian Jewish Welfare Society.

In 1948, the Larino Home was renamed the Frances Barkman House. When it was sold in 1965, three Frances Barkman Homes were established as family group homes, in Caufield. These closed in the early 1990s.

== See also ==
- Judaism in Australia
