= Gwynneth Vaughan Buchanan =

Australian zoologist

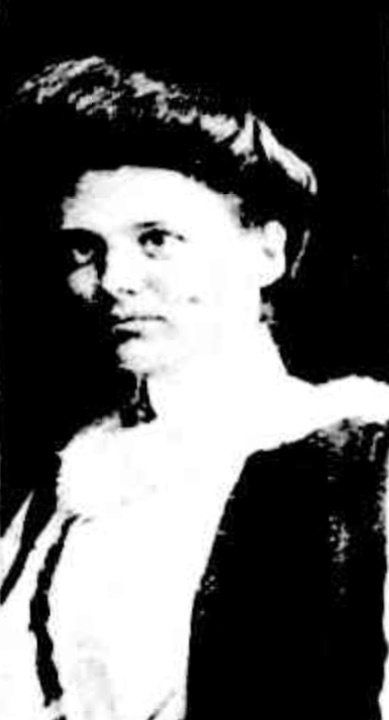
Gwynneth Vaughan Buchanan at her graduation in 1908

Gwynneth Vaughan Buchanan (1886–1945) was an Australian zoologist. She is best known for her work on animal morphology, culminating in the book Elements of Animal Morphology. She was a lecturer, and then a senior lecturer, at the University of Melbourne from 1921 to 1944.

== Early life ==
Buchanan was born on 21 November 1886, in Sydney, New South Wales, Australia. She was the only child of Thomas Buchanan and Gwynneth Vaughan. Her father, Thomas Buchanan, was a banker. After her father's death in 1897, she moved to Melbourne to live with her mother. Her religious influences have Anglican origins.

== Education and career ==
Buchanan graduated from the University of Melbourne with B.Sc. (first class honours) in March 1908. She also won the scholarship in biology for her final honours examination. In December the same year, she won the MacBain scholarship for her work in the field of Australian earth worms, which allowed her to continue in the same field of research until 1909, when she was made junior demonstrator in biology. She then graduated M.Sc. in 1910, and began to tutor in biology at Queen's College, Melbourne. She also received a bursary in support of her research. In August 1913, she moved to England, where she studied at University College, London. She received her D.Sc. at the University of Melbourne in April 1916.

In 1915, Buchanan received a government scholarship to study human embryology. She also taught at Queen's, Ormond and Trinity Colleges as well as the Presbyterian Ladies' College. She was a public examiner in anatomy and physiology from 1914 to 1916, and in animal morphology and physiology from 1919 to 1922. Her book Elements of Animal Morphology, first published in 1921, was used in schools until 1963.

=== Teaching roles ===
Buchanan was appointed the lecturer-in-charge of biology at the University of Western Australia for two terms in 1920. The very next year, she became a full-time lecturer in Zoology at the University of Melbourne, and then in 1925, a senior lecturer. She also took a year's study leave in Britain and the United States of America before taking on this role. In 1926, she became the acting head of department. By this point, she was increasingly more preoccupied with teaching instead of research, carrying out a programme in the senior zoology years.

=== Roles in clubs and societies ===
- Leading member of University Science Club, founding member in 1935
- Secretary of McCoy Society for Field Investigation and Research
- Staff representative in Melbourne University Union Committee, 1921–1935
- Member of Victorian Women Graduates' Association, president in 1934–1935
- Delegate to the conferences of the International Federation of University Women in Oslo, 1924 and in Cracow, 1936
- Co-honorary secretary of the committee working to establish the University Women's College, 1920–1937
- One of the first governors of the University Women's College, and a council member until 1945
- President of the Lyceum Club (Melbourne), 1929–1931
- Held office as president and vice-president of the University Women's Hockey Club
- Held office as president and vice-president of the Victorian Women's Hockey Association, most of 1927–1937

== Retirement and late life ==
By 1935, Buchanan was already afflicted with arteriosclerosis and chronic nephritis, and that resulted in her taking a leave of absence in 1944 and subsequent retirement at the end of the year. She died on 21 June 1945 in Victoria, Australia. She was cremated.
