= Ethel Osborne =

Australian industrial hygienist and medical practitioner

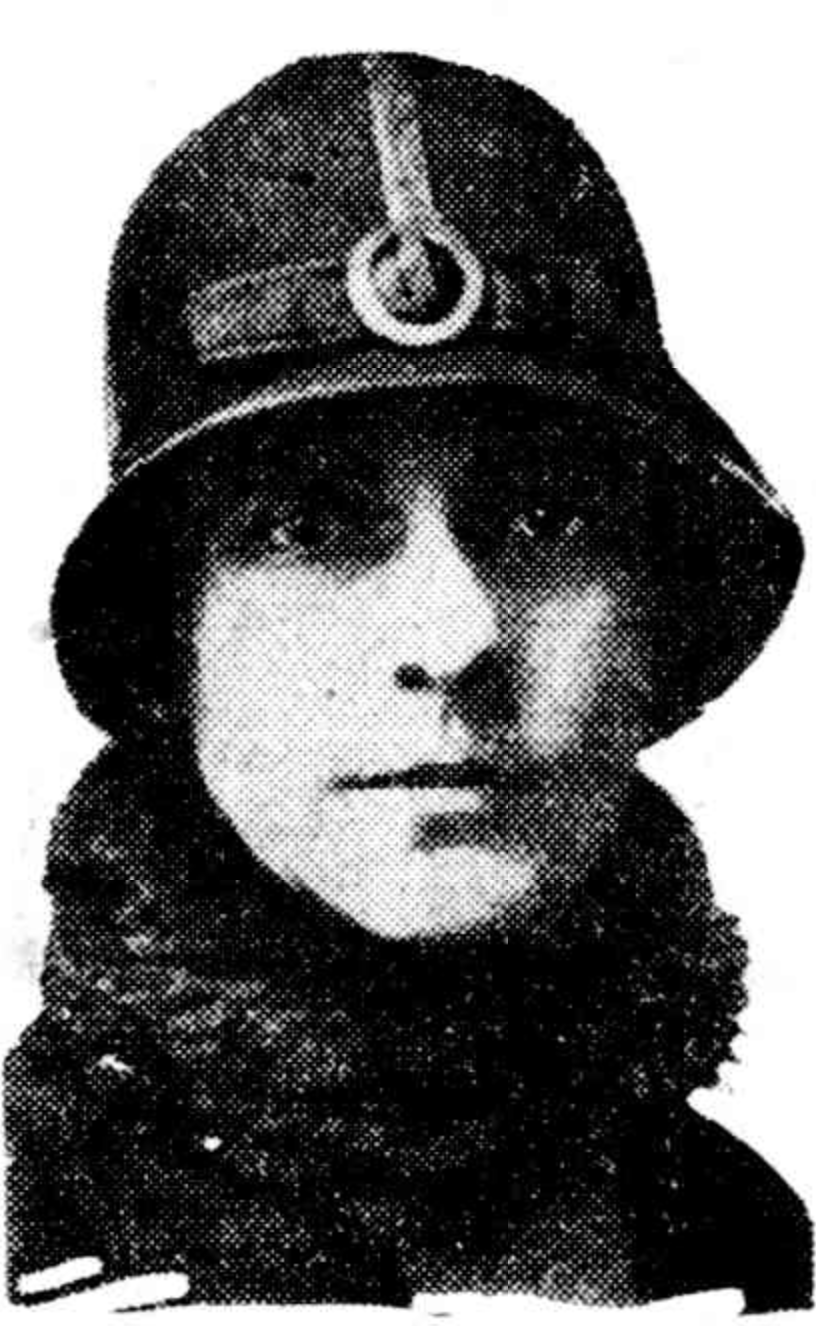
- Born: 30 January 1882; Armley, Leeds, Australia
- Died: 3 December 1968 (aged 86); East Melbourne, Victoria, Australia

Ethel Elizabeth Osborne (née Goodson 30 January 1882 – 3 December 1968) was a British-born Australian doctor who was an expert in the field of hygiene and public health. She was also a founder of both the Lyceum Club, and the Catalysts.

== Biography ==
Osborne was born in Armley, a district of Leeds in England and studied at the University of Leeds, graduating in 1901. On the 10 December 1903 she married William Alexander Osborne and then travelled to Melbourne.

In 1910 Osborne founded the Catalysts, a women's group in Victoria. She also founded a Lyceum Club in Melbourne, and was elected vice-president during its first meeting on 21 March 1912.

Osborne served for two years with the British Ministry of Munitions during World War II as a night welfare worker, where she performed research for the Health of Munition Workers' Committee and the Industrial Fatigue Research Board, publishing two reports, "Industrial Hygiene as Applied to Munition Workers" (1921) and was the coauthor of "Study of Accident Causation" (1922). Osborne also conducted inspections of the Women's Land Army training centres, taking her then three children with her. In 1919 Osborne returned to Melbourne.

Osborne had four children, Audrey Josephine in 1905, Gerard in 1908, Yrsa in 1913, and Charis in 1920. Osborne retired in 1938. In 2008 she was inducted into the Victorian Honour Roll of Women.
