= International Association of Lyceum Clubs =

Women's club in London, England

- Predecessor: International Lyceum Club for Women Artists and Writers
- Formation: 1903
- Founder: Constance Smedley
- Founded at: 128 Piccadilly, London, England
- Type: Women's club
- Website: lyceumclubs.org

The International Association of Lyceum Clubs was a women's club founded in London, England in 1903 by Constance Smedley. The club is still active.

== Background ==
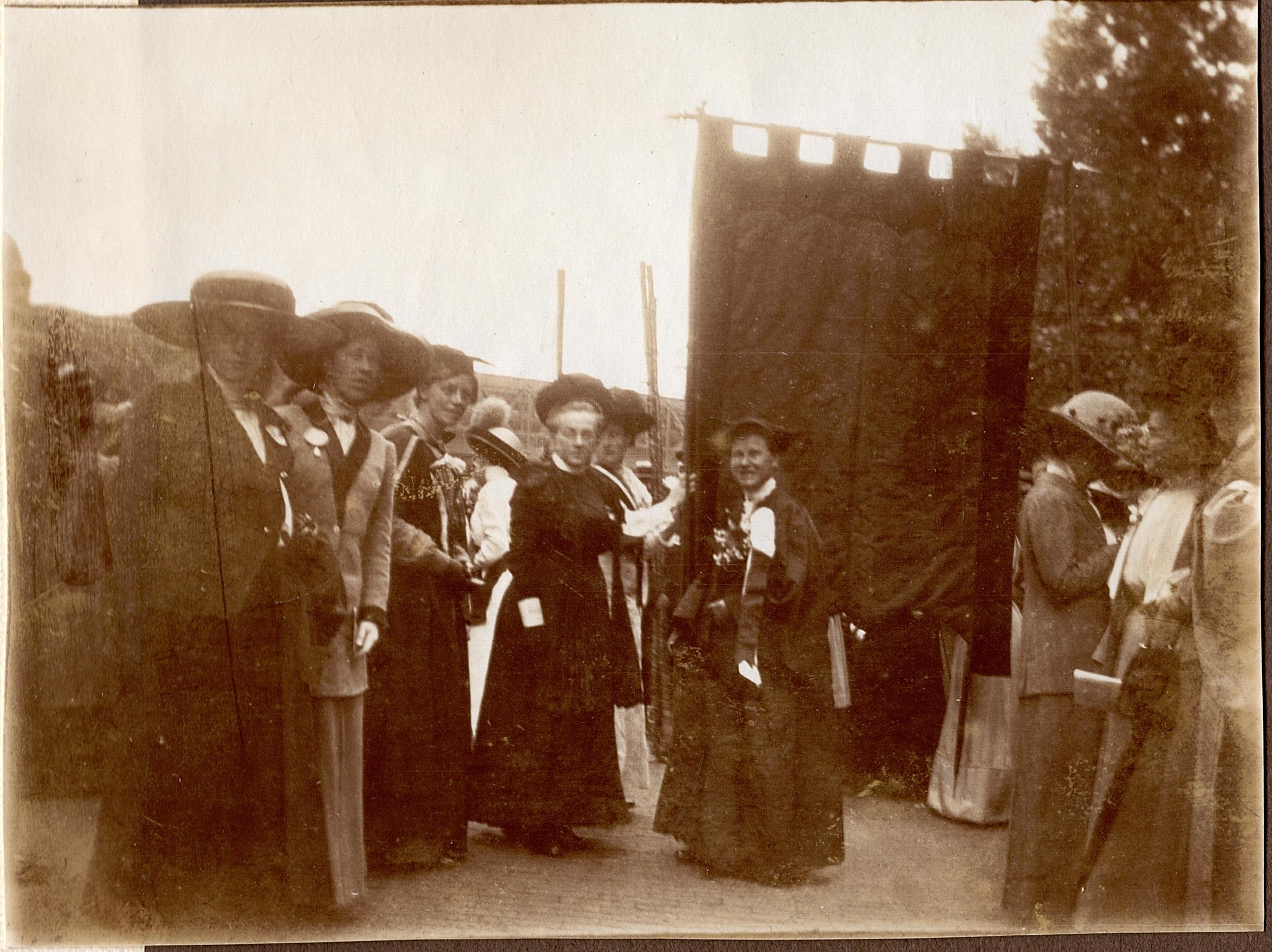
Women affiliated with Lyceum Clubs included Millicent Fawcett (fifth from left) and Lady Frances Balfour (to her left) photographed at the Women's Coronation Procession

The club was formed as a place for women involved with literature, journalism, art, science and medicine to meet in an atmosphere that was similar to the men's professional clubs of that era. Women would be able to hold meetings, provide meals, and accommodations in a professional environment.

Constance Smedley founded the first club as the International Lyceum Club for Women Artists and Writers at 128 Piccadilly in London. Sister organizations were soon established in Berlin, Paris, Florence, etc.

The club's membership was distinguished from its inception and included Lady Frances Balfour and Millicent Fawcett, both well known suffragettes. Lady Balfour was the club's first chairman. Her vice chair-man was Enid Moberly Bell. In February 1919, Fawcett represented women at the Paris Peace Conference where she was a guest at the city's Lyceum Club.

== Countries with Lyceum Clubs ==
Some countries have multiple clubs

- Australia – Lyceum Club Adelaide · Lyceum Club Brisbane · Melbourne Lyceum Club · Karrakatta Club Incorporated (Perth) · The Sydney Lyceum Club Inc. (Note: The Sydney Lyceum Club Inc. was first established in 1914 as the Sydney Lyceum Club by Agnes Rose-Soley (wrote as Rose de Boheme))
- Austria
- Belgium
- Cyprus – Larnaca · Limassol · Nicosia · Paralimni
- Finland – Helsinki · Oulu · Turku
- France – Bordeaux · Brittany · Caen-Normandy · Dijon-Burgundy · Fontainebleau Ile de France · Grenoble · Lille · Limousin · Lyon · Marseille · Orléans · Paris · Pau-Béarn · Troyes–Champagne
- Germany – Aachen · Berlin · Frankfurt Rhein-Main · Hamburg · Karlsrube · Konstanz · Munich · Stuttgart
- Greece – Athens
- Italy – Catania · Cremona · Florence · Genoa · Naples
- Morocco
- Netherlands – Amsterdam · Groningen · Nijmegen
- New Zealand – Auckland Lyceum Club · Morrinsville · Otorohanga · Tauranga · Te Awamutu · Te Kuiti · Te Puke Lyceum Club · Waikato · Whakatane
- Portugal
- Russia
- Sweden
- Switzerland – Basel · Bern · Bienne · Geneva · La Chaux-de-Fonds · Lausanne · Lucerne · Locarno · Lugano · Neuchatel · St Gallen · Zurich
- United Kingdom – London · Edinburgh
- United States of America
- España Lyceum Club Femenino de Madrid
- Cuba Lyceum Club Femenino de La Habana

== See also ==
- The Lyceum, Liverpool
- Lyceum Club (Dallas)
- Lyceum Club (Australia)
- Karrakatta Club
