= Jane Stocks Greig =

Scottish-Australian medical doctor and public health specialist (1872–1939)

Jean Greig
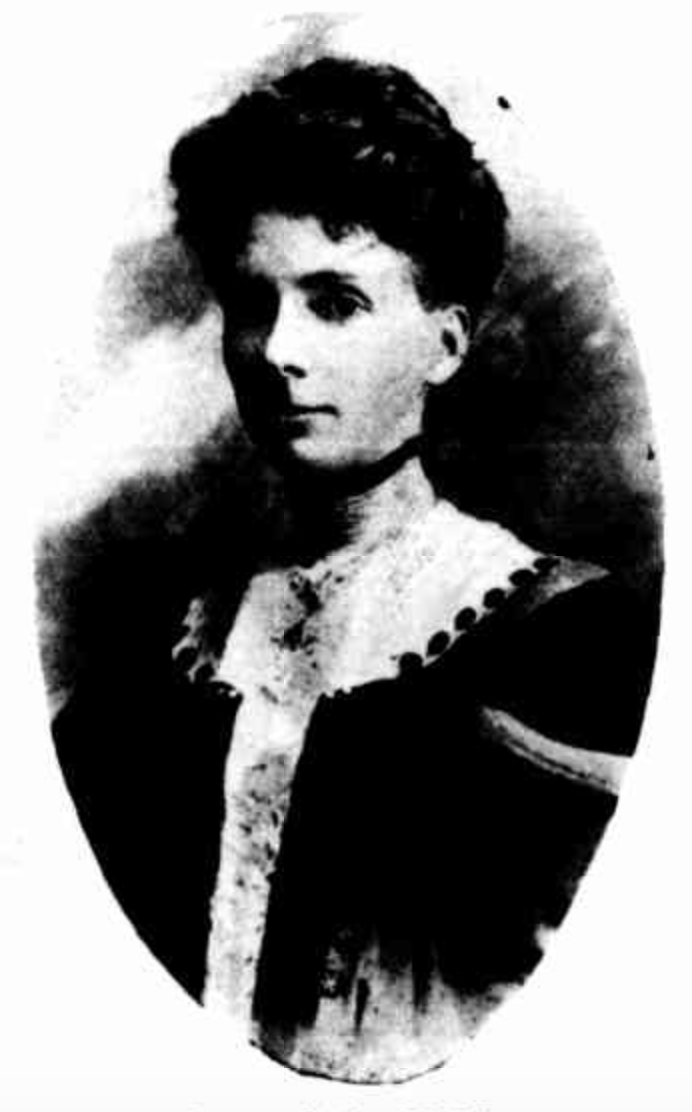
- Dr Jean Greig, 1907
- Born: Jane Stocks Greig; 12 June 1872; Cupar, Fife, Scotland
- Died: 16 September 1939 (aged 67); Richmond, Australia
- Education: University of Melbourne
- Occupation: physician
- Years active: 1897–1937
- Known for: advocate for public health, Chief medical officer of Victoria
- Medical career
- Field: public health

Jane Stocks "Jean" Greig (12 June 1872 – 16 September 1939) was a Scottish-Australian medical doctor and public health specialist.

== Early life and education ==
Jane Stocks Greig was born in 1872 in Cupar, Scotland, the oldest of eight children of textile merchant and higher education advocate Robert Greig, and his wife Jane Stocks (née Macfarlane) (1848-1902). She had five sisters and three brothers - Janet Lindsay (1874-1950), Clara Puella (1877-1957), Flos Greig (1880-1958), James Arthur (1882-1935), Ernest Howard (1884-1972), Hector Maximus (1887-1979) and Stella Fida (1889-1913).

She was educated at the High School of Dundee and while she was in Dundee her father wrote to his brother to check that women would be allowed to study medicine in Melbourne. He was told that it was possible and the family migrated to Melbourne, Australia in 1889 where she then attended Brunswick Ladies College. With her father's support and encouragement both she and her sister Janet enrolled at the medical school of the University of Melbourne in 1891. She graduated with a Bachelor of Medicine in 1895, and completed her Bachelor of Surgery with honours in 1896.

== Career ==
After leaving university, she worked in general practice in the Melbourne suburbs of Brighton and Fitzroy, and in 1896 founded the Victorian Medical Women's Society. She was a founding member of the Queen Victoria Hospital in 1896 and was an honorary medical staff member at the hospital until 1910.

Greig returned to the University of Melbourne to study for a Diploma of Public Health; when she completed the degree in 1910 she became the first woman at the university to do so. She went on to work for the Victorian Department of Education as a medical officer, providing healthcare services for schoolchildren. She was promoted to the department's Chief Medical Officer in 1929. From 1924 to 1925, she was a commissioner on the Royal Commission on Health. She visited a number of countries to give talks on types medical and dental inspection, and published numerous articles and reports in the Medical Journal of Australia. She was a lecturer in hygiene at the University of Melbourne and at the Teachers' Training College from 1916 to 1939.

== Death and legacy ==
Greig died from cancer in 1939 in Richmond, Victoria. She was inducted into the Victorian Honour Roll of Women in 2007, and in 2012 she was featured in an Australian postage stamp series titled "Medical Doctors".
