= Georgina Sweet =

Australian zoologist

Georgina Sweet OBE
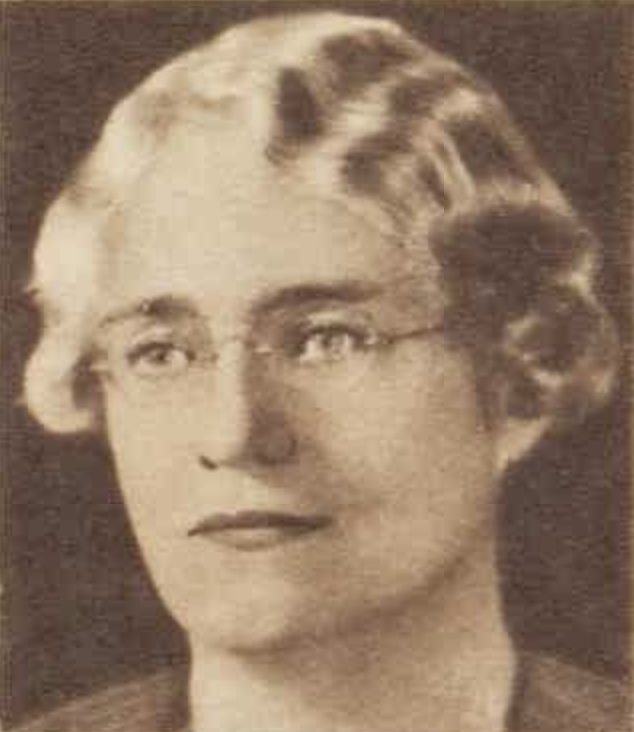
- 1937 photograph by Spencer Shier
- Born: 22 January 1875; Brunswick, Victoria, Australia
- Died: 1 January 1946 (aged 70)
- Occupation: zoologist
- Known for: parasitologist

Georgina Sweet OBE (22 January 1875 – 1 January 1946) was an Australian zoologist and women's rights activist. She was the first woman to graduate with a Doctor of Science from the University of Melbourne, and was the first female acting professor in an Australian university.

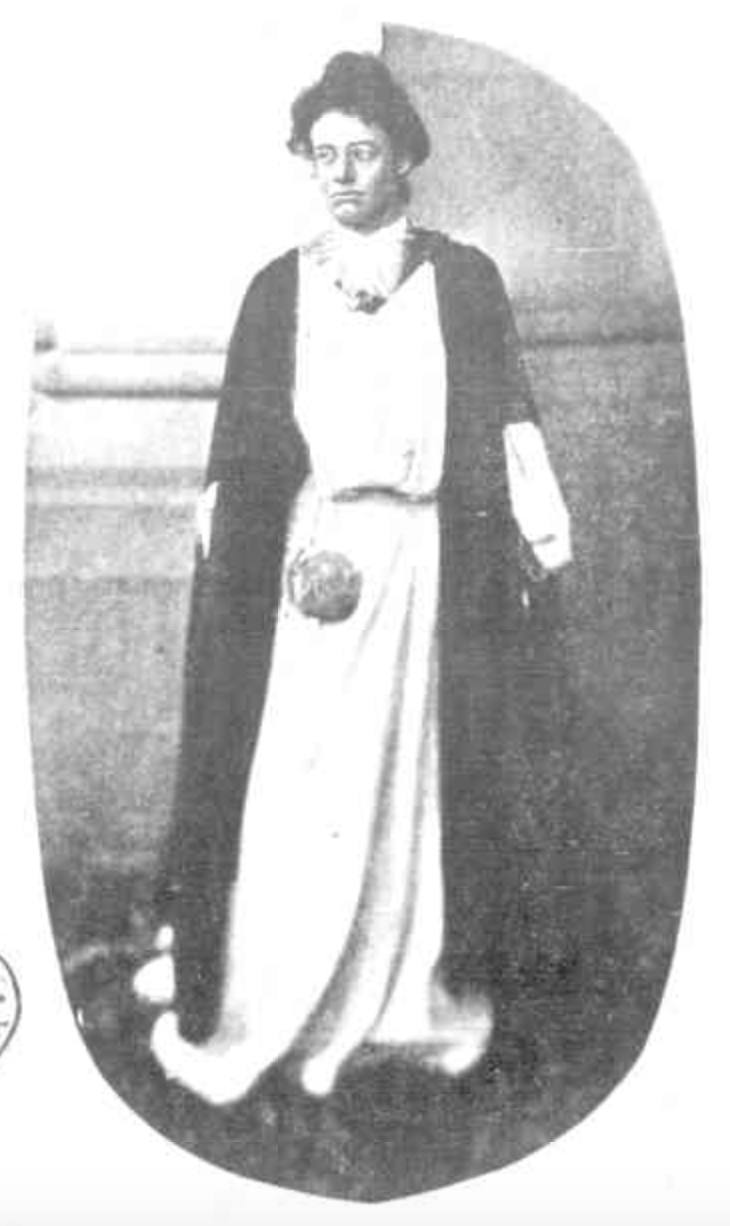
Georgina Sweet at her graduation, 1904

== Early life and education ==
Sweet was born into a Methodist family in Brunswick, Victoria. Her English father George Sweet was an amateur geologist and encouraged both his daughters to enter tertiary education. Sweet attended the Parkville Ladies' College, then went on to the University of Melbourne where she completed her BSc in 1896 and her MSc in 1898. Her early research was supervised by Baldwin Spencer and was on Australian fauna, but her later studies were based in the veterinary department working on parasites. She was awarded her DSc in 1904 for her study of Notoryctes – the marsupial mole; she was the first woman to be awarded a Doctor of Science at the University. Her work on parasites in Australian native animals and stock led to her being the first woman to win the David Syme Research Prize in 1911, contributing to her reputation as Australia's foremost parasitologist.

== University career ==
Sweet taught biology in high schools while studying; she was employed by the University from 1898 when she began work as a demonstrator, then lectured at Queen's College from 1901 to 1908 until offered a position in the university faculty. She lectured in both biology and parasitology and bore a heavy workload due to the periodic absence of the faculties professors. She became second-in-charge of the biology school when Thomas Sergeant Hall died in 1915, and from November 1916 to March 1917 she was Australia's first female acting professor when Baldwin Spencer took leave. She was encouraged to apply to take his position permanently, but was not successful, the position instead being filled by W. E. Agar. She was promoted to associate professor in 1920, the most senior academic position a woman had attained at the university. Stress and over-work led her to apply for sick leave in 1921, she worked part-time from 1924 and retired in 1926.

After leaving teaching Sweet continued to be involved in university life. She was active in the Graduates' Association and was involved in the provisional council for the establishment of the University Women's College for 20 years. The first stone of the Georgina Sweet wing was laid in 1936 and in the following year the first nondenominational hall of residence affiliated with the University opened. In 1936 she became the first woman to be elected to the University Council.

== Women's rights advocate ==
Sweet was a vigorous supporter of women's rights. She campaigned to have women on the University Senate and outside university her interests involved participation in national and international bodies promoting women's rights. Sweet was Australian president of the Young Women's Christian Association, 1927–1934; vice-president of the world YWCA from 1934; she was also foundation member of the Victorian Women Graduates' Association and in 1930 became the first president of the Pan-Pacific Women's Association.

Sweet enjoyed travel and made a journey overland from Cape Town to Cairo with Australian historian Jessie Stobo Watson Webb in 1922. She also travelled widely in Asia. When she died in 1946 she willed her estate to the Methodist church, the University and other charitable organisations. Some of her bequest to the University was used to establish the Georgina Sweet Bursary, which provides funds to a student of sufficient academic merit who is in special need of financial assistance.

== Awards and honours ==
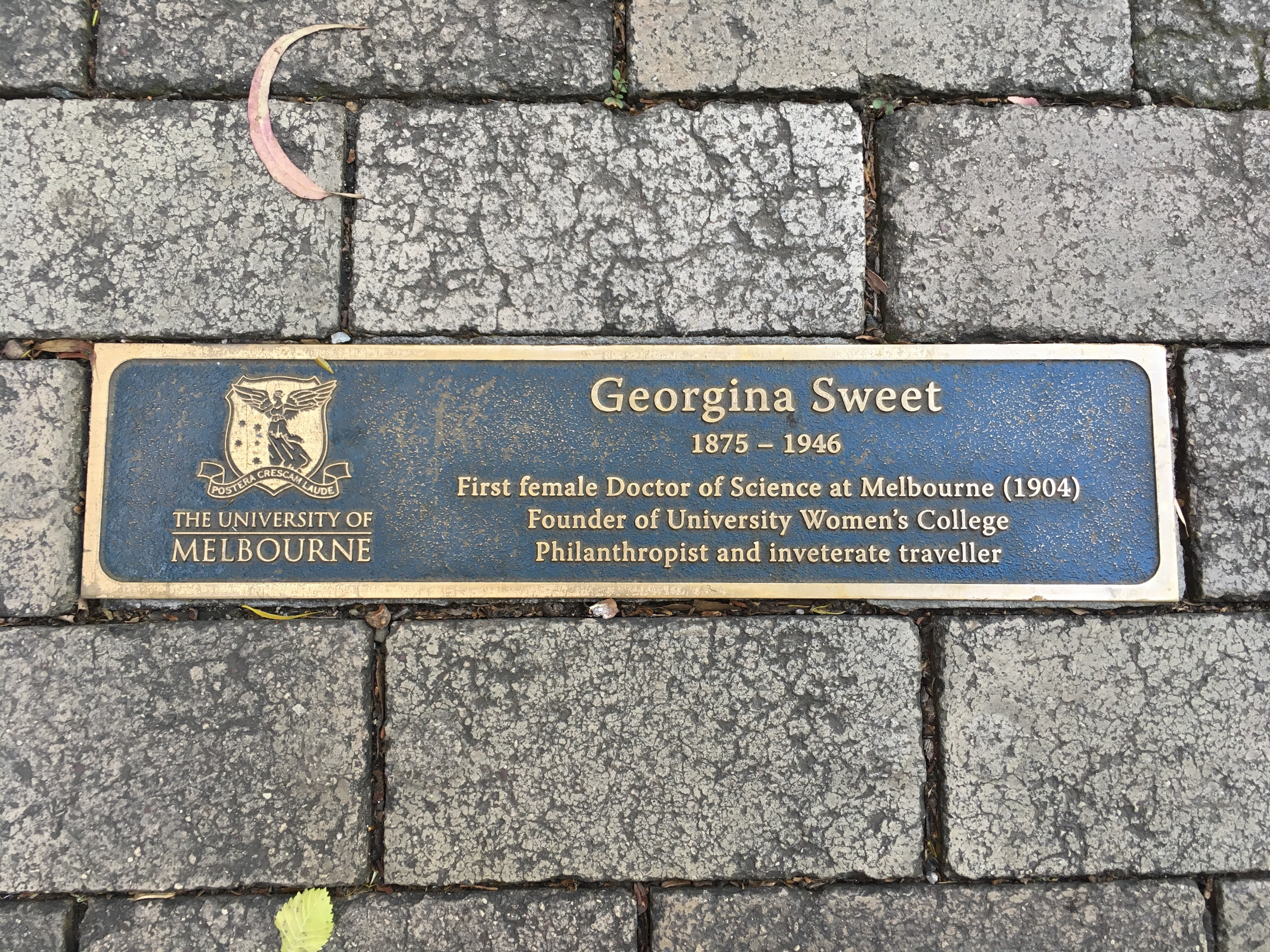
Plaque on Professors Walk on the Parkville campus of Melbourne University.

Sweet was appointed Officer of The Order of the British Empire on 3 June 1935, for services to women's movements. The Australian Federation of University Women offers an annual scholarship for Australian women undertaking postgraduate studies named in her honour.

Sweet was awarded the University of Melbourne Award, which "recognises those individuals who have made an outstanding and enduring contribution to the University and its scholarly community". A bronze plaque honouring her is on the wall along the Professors' Walk at the Parkville campus of the University.

In 2010 the Australian Research Council named an award, the Kathleen Fitzpatrick and Georgina Sweet fellowship after Sweet for women researchers in science and technology disciplines.

Sweet Place in the Canberra suburb of Chisholm is named in her honour.
