= Jessie Webb =

Australian academic and historian

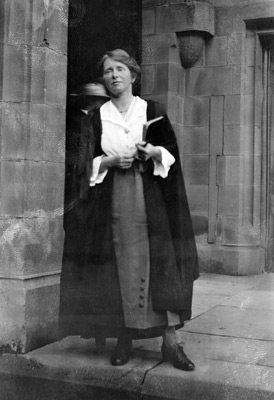
- Webb in academic dress at the university, c.1914–1918
- Born: Jessie Webb; 31 July 1880; Tumut, New South Wales, Australia
- Died: 17 February 1944 (aged 63); St Kilda, Victoria, Australia
- Education: Balaclava College; University of Melbourne
- Occupations: Academic; Historian

Jessie Stobo Watson Webb (31 July 1880 – 17 February 1944) was an Australian academic and historian, one of the first female teachers at the University of Melbourne. The only monograph of Webb's life is by R. T. Ridley, published by the History Department of Melbourne University.

== Early life ==
Webb was born in 1880 on Ellerslie Station, near Tumut, at the foot of the Snowy Mountains in New South Wales. Webb was the only child of grazier Charles Webb, originally from New Zealand, and his wife Jessie Webb, née Watson, of Scotland, who died shortly after childbirth. Webb was orphaned at age nine when her father died after an accident, and Webb was sent to live with her mother's family in Melbourne.

Webb attended Balaclava College, in Melbourne's inner south-eastern suburbs, and passed her matriculation exams in October 1896 at the age of sixteen. She enrolled at the University of Melbourne on Valentine's Day 1898. During her undergraduate study she won the Cobden Club medal, and a share of the J. D. Wyselaskie scholarship in English constitutional history. She graduated with a Bachelor of Arts in April 1902, attaining first-class honours in both history and political economy, as well as logic and philosophy. In 1904 Webb would add to this a Masters of Arts.

== Trinity College ==
From 1901 to 1912 Webb tutored history and political economy at Trinity College at the University of Melbourne. During this time she also tutored at Ormond College, and at several girls' secondary schools. Webb joined Clara Puella Greig who operated an independent coaching college, staffed with other female university graduates. Webb ran tutoring programs catering for students from matriculation level through the whole duration of undergraduate courses. In May 1906 she registered with the government as a teacher.

=== Night lecturer ===
In December 1908, after her third application to the university, Webb was employed as a night lecturer with the history department – the first woman to be appointed to such a position in Australia – teaching ancient and British history. At her appointment, Webb was the only other teacher in the department, aside from Professor John Simeon Elkington.

=== Full-time lecturer ===
On Elkington's retirement in 1913, she was elevated to a full-time lecturer, after Ernest Scott, the new professor, successfully lobbied the university to provide for a full-time assistant. Under Scott, and later under Scott's successor, Max Crawford, Webb served as acting professor whenever the professor himself was on leave, taking over their classes and their administrative duties too. Webb had extensive teaching responsibilities of her own; in 1914, for example, she gave two lectures each week in Ancient History, and two further evening lectures in both Ancient History and British History Part I weekly, in addition to a tutorial class with the honours students and consultations on the students' work. Webb was primarily responsible for communicating with the correspondence students, and she even "sent her own books out on rotation to these students as the university provided no funding to buy books for circulation." Webb did not underestimate the importance of those students, comprising as they did about a quarter of the faculty's enrolment in 1913, "and she knew that many of them were teachers trying to improve their qualifications."

Webb was promoted to become a senior lecturer within the history department in 1923. In 1925, she was an acting professor. Webb was an acting professor again in 1933–34 and in 1942–44. However, despite Max Crawford recommending Webb for an associate professorship in his 1937 report to the university, Webb was never permanently promoted beyond the position of lecturer, only ever acting as a fill-in. Her friend Dr Sweet had been appointed to an associate professorship in 1919, the first female to hold such a position at the university, though only after being passed over in the search for a full professor to succeed Baldwin Spencer, despite extensive support and recommendation from within the local and international academic community. Discrimination against women in academia was not uncommon at the time. In a speech to the university's Historical Society in 1928, reported in Farrago, Webb spoke sardonically of the systematic exclusion of women from the archaeological profession. Webb's friend Ella Latham could no longer continue in her own teaching career after her marriage. Indeed, Webb herself was only employed by the university on her third application, having been beaten twice prior by male candidates with, on paper, lesser qualifications than she. Webb remained the only female employee in the history department until the appointment of Kathleen Fitzpatrick in 1938.

Beginning in 1924, Webb organised regular purchases on behalf of the university of ancient coins and statuary casts, for the purposes of study and to decorate the Arts faculty building. The Jessie Webb Collection now forms part of the Classics and Archaeology Collection at the Ian Potter Museum of Art. Elsewhere in university life, Webb contributed to the founding of the University Women's College – since 1975 known as University College – which was established in 1933.

== Literary anthology ==
Webb joined in 1909 with her friend Ella Latham – fellow 1902 Melbourne Arts graduate, fellow tutor at her coaching academy, and wife of John Latham, future Chief Justice of Australia – in editing a literary anthology designed for school students, Phases of Literature: From Pope to Browning. The book was small, but included substantial notes on the selected texts which, evincing Webb's influence, were peppered with classical and historical references. It was to be the only work that Webb ever published.

== Community activities ==
Aside from her academic employment, Webb was involved in a variety of community activities during this time. When the Royal Historical Society of Victoria was founded in 1909, it met in Webb's rooms in the Block Arcade. Webb was a founding member of the Lyceum Club in 1912, and from 1920 to 1922 was the club's president. In 1922 Webb was a founding member of the Victorian Women Graduates' Association (now the Australian Federation of University Women, Victoria); she was President of this body also, from 1924 to 1925. During the First World War, Webb campaigned for conscription along with a group of other university staff; she and Harrison Moore produced a pro-conscription pamphlet.

In late 1922 and early 1923, Webb joined Dr Georgina Sweet, fellow lecturer and also a founding Lyceum Club and Women Graduates' Association member, on a journey through Africa, crossing the continent from Cape Town, Cape Colony to Cairo, Egypt. Webb had a strong interest in Greek history, and following her trip to Africa, she spent eight months at the British School at Athens. During this time she visited archaeological sites in Mycenae and Knossos, where she was taken on a tour by Arthur Evans, and she toured Crete on the back of a mule. Later in 1923, Webb was an alternate delegate for Australia to the League of Nations.

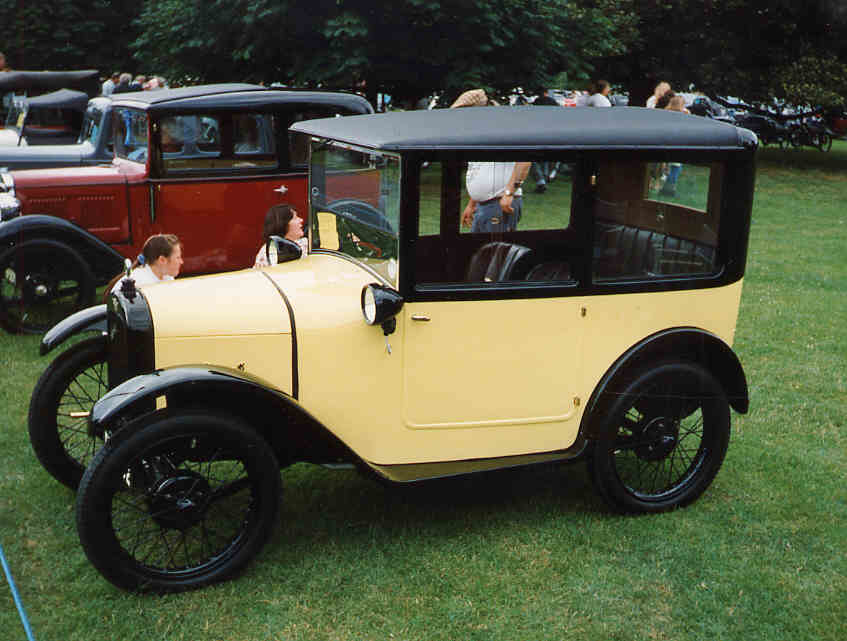
An Austin 7, of a sort akin to that in which Webb and Anderson drove to Alice Springs.

== Travel ==
In August 1926, Webb, with her friend and fellow Lyceum member Alice Anderson, travelled to central Australia, driving to Alice Springs and back in an Austin 7. Anderson, a pioneering female mechanic and motor garage owner-operator, died shortly after returning from the six-week trip, after accidentally shooting herself while cleaning some guns borrowed for the journey.

Webb returned to Europe again in 1936 – sailing out on a Norwegian cargo ship – beginning in England, North Africa (where she visited Greek and Roman settlements) and France, then travelling to Athens by train, and onwards to Turkey's Aegean coast, and then inland to Cappadocia. She returned via Germany, Syria and Mesopotamian sites in Iraq such as Ur and Babylon. For most of the journey Webb travelled alone, by bus and by train. Webb did not neglect her teaching duties during this time, however, composing nine exam papers for her subjects and posting them back to Australia ready to be sat by her students.

== Death ==
During her last stint as acting professor, Webb continued to exercise her administrative duties in running the history department despite being hospitalised with cancer. Webb died at the Linden Private Hospital in St Kilda in 1944. Following her death, the library in the history department at the university was named after her. Webb bequeathed £7,128 to the university in her will, which is used to fund the Jessie Webb Scholarship. This provides funding for a student to emulate Webb's own experience at the British School, to study and research for a season in Greece.

== Legacy ==
Webb's contribution to history and the teaching of history in Melbourne has been little noticed by subsequent generations. That Webb did not publish any historical work has contributed to this, though Kathleen Fitzpatrick has said that Webb "underestimated her ability and scholarship, and probably felt handicapped by distance from ancient sites, great libraries and professional colleagues which could not be bridged by rare periods of overseas leave." Susan Janson has posited that the strong focus on the publication of research is an aspect of later generations, and that Webb "was trained in an older tradition that stressed the pedagogical imperative for history".

Though Webb did not publish, she was for the most part well regarded for the quality of her teaching and the scholarship that went into her lectures. To the practice of history as taught at Melbourne, Webb brought an emphasis on historiography, and critical investigation of secondary material, alongside an associated emphasis on the use of primary sources. Richard Selleck argues that for the quality of her teaching, Webb "was respected in her time and honoured after her career finished," distinguishing herself particularly in delivering an excellent standard of education to the night students and the correspondence students, two groups not favoured by the central administration of the university. Ronald Ridley has praised the scope of her teaching, encompassing not just political but economic, social and cultural history, and covering not merely Greek and Roman civilisation but their antecedents in the region also, the introduction of which into the curriculum Ridley regards as her "most fundamental contribution to the students' awareness". Though Manning Clark was disappointed at the lack of "wisdom and understanding" he had sought but failed to find in Webb's lectures, A. A. Phillips praised her knack for human observation, which he compared to that of Jane Austen, and Keith Hancock rated her among the best three teachers he had at Melbourne.

While Webb's speciality was Ancient Greek history, she was well read in all classical history. She had a strong interest in Roman history, and followed the rapidly developing fields of Egyptian and Mesopotamian history and archaeology throughout her career. Former students noted the breadth of Webb's interests and reading, and her frequent inclusion of the best contemporary research in her lectures. Susan Janson has praised the sustained quality and variety of the large number of exam papers Webb set over the course of her career, and argued that "[i]f we take [them] as our evidence of Jessie Webb's productivity, we can revalue her work as a historian."

The Jessie Webb Award is presented annually by the Numismatic Association of Victoria for the best article by a female author in the Victorian Numismatic Journal.
