= Lyceum Club (Dallas) =

Women's organization in Dallas, Texas

The Lyceum Club of Dallas, Texas, United States, established by the city’s middle-class female establishment in 1931, promoted knowledge and comprehension of literature, music, art, drama, and later politics and international relations among women. Holding a steady membership of 45-75 women, the Dallas Lyceum club attracted notable individuals of the time, including musicians, authors, and government figures.

== Background ==
Founded in 1931 by Mrs. Alma Thurman, the Lyceum Club provided a Southern counterpart to the women’s club movement in the Northern United States. The Lyceum Club’s mission to explore all disciplines of the humanities paralleled the mission of the first women’s club, Sorosis, based in New York City. The Southern counterpart that the Lyceum Club provided, however, presented a new take on the usual modes of study of the humanities by specifically calling attention and recognition to Southern artists, authors, and musicians.

== Membership ==
The club steadily grew in membership numbers that it more than doubled in the first 25 years. (Note: 1931 history reports 45 members. By 1956 the number reported was 72 members) The elected officials led the group using increasingly individual modes of leadership with each passing year. This is reflected in the Spring Parties of the club. While the first Spring Parties of the Lyceum Club took place as a simple tea party at the Dallas Country Club, by the 1950s, the Spring Party could be expected to have a Creole theme to reflect the club’s study of Southern literature and art. This was due to the Creole background of the current president, who chose to focus the year’s activities on Creole-influences in the humanities.

== Official documents ==
The officials of the club would also issue official documents such as the official history of the club in increasingly creative methods, including poems, plays, and song verses. This change in the written histories serves as a clear sign of how members of the Lyceum Club not only studied the world of the creative arts, but also embraced the chance to participate in the creativity themselves. Thus, throughout the decades, the Lyceum Club continued to achieve its original goal to cultivate creativity and understanding of all variations of arts and literature through its bi-monthly meetings.
