= Elizabeth Inglis Lothian =

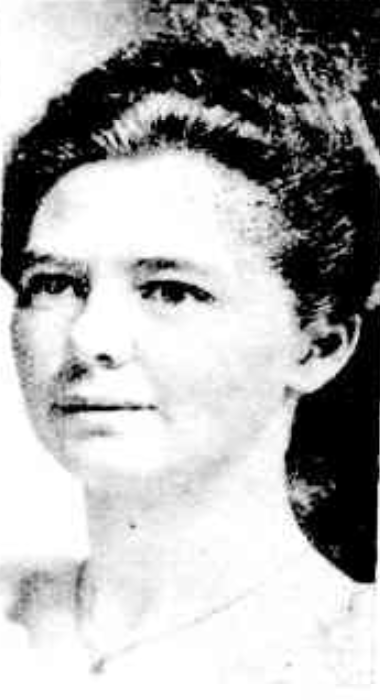
Elizabeth Inglis Lothian in 1908 on graduation as Master of Arts, University of Melbourne

Elizabeth Inglis Lothian (22 October 1881 - 6 May 1973) was an Australian teacher of classics.

== Biography ==
Lothian was born in 1881 in Gateshead, Durham, England to John Inglis Lothian, a publisher's cashier, and his wife Lillias, née Smith. The family emigrated to Australia, arriving in Melbourne in 1888. Lothian attended St Kilda State School followed by Presbyterian Ladies' College, East Melbourne. She then entered Ormond College as a non-resident at the University of Melbourne and studied classics towards a bachelor of arts degree, which she completed in 1903. In 1905 she entered Newnham College, Cambridge, on a university scholarship and studied classical and comparative philology and logic. In 1907 she returned to Melbourne and in 1908 completed a master's degree at the University of Melbourne.

In 1908, Lothian took a position as classics mistress at Tintern Ladies' College, Hawthorn, followed by a position as senior classics mistress at the Church of England Girls' Grammar School in 1914. In 1914 she also completed her diploma in education from the University of Melbourne. She retired from teaching in 1946 but continued to teach classics at Queen's College until 1954.

Lothian served on a number of professional bodies during her career. She was a member of the Victorian Women Graduates' Association from 1920, and in 1922 she was appointed to the Victorian School Board's classics standing committee. Lothian also served as a council member for the Classical Association of Victoria from 1927 to 1960. From 1917 to 1953, she was involved with the establishment and running of University Women's College.

Lothian died on 6 May 1973 at Box Hill, Victoria.
