= Janet Greig =

Australian anaesthetist (1874–1950)

Janet Grieg
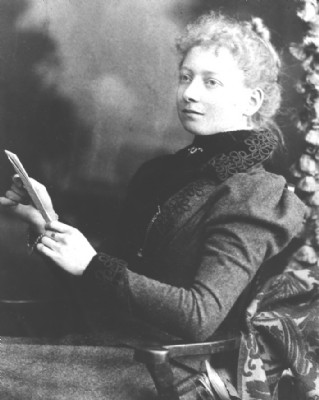
- Janet Greig, circa 1900
- Born: Janet Lindsay Greig; 8 August 1874; Broughty Ferry, Scotland
- Died: 18 October 1950 (aged 76); London, England
- Education: Brunswick Ladies College; University of Melbourne
- Occupation: anaesthetist
- Years active: 1897-1937
- Medical career
- Field: anaesthesia

Janet Lindsay Greig (8 August 1874 – 18 October 1950) was a Scottish-Australian anaesthetist. In 2007, she was inducted into the Victorian Honour Roll of Women.

== Early life and education ==
Janet Lindsay "Jenny" Greig was born in 1874 in Broughty Ferry, Scotland, the second of eight children of textile merchant and higher education advocate Robert Greig, and his wife Jane Stocks (née Macfarlane) (1848-1902). She had five sisters and three brothers - Jane Stocks Greig (1872-1939), Clara Puella (1877-1957), Flos Greig (1880-1958), James Arthur (1882-1935), Ernest Howard (1884-1972), Hector Maximus (1887-1979) and Stella Fida (1889-1913). She was educated at the High School of Dundee until the family migrated to Melbourne, Australia in 1889, where she then attended Brunswick Ladies College. Her father encouraged his children to pursue tertiary education, and in 1891 both she and her sister Jane enrolled at the medical school of the University of Melbourne. She graduated from the University, with a Bachelor of Medicine, Bachelor of Surgery with honours in 1895.

== Career ==
The following year, she and Alfreda Gamble were appointed resident medical officers at Melbourne Hospital, making them the first two women to fill such a role at the hospital and against considerable opposition from the hospital staff. She later became the first female anaesthetist in the state of Victoria, serving as an honorary anaesthetist at the Royal Women's Hospital during 1900–1917. During World War I, Greig volunteered to work as a medical officer at a military hospital in Melbourne, but was told that there was "no necessity for lady doctors in the military hospitals"; instead, she was recruited to examine nurses for military service.

For many years, Greig ran a private practice in Fitzroy, Victoria and worked as a consultant from Collins Street, Melbourne. She was one of the founding members of the Queen Victoria Hospital for Women and Children and was an honorary medical staff member there for 54 years. When a new pathology wing was constructed at the hospital in 1937, it was named after Greig. In 1940 she was admitted to the Royal Australasian College of Physicians and elected President of the Victorian Medical Women's Society.

Greig retired in 1947 and focused on her research of migraines. She died in 1950 while visiting London on a research trip.

== Awards and honours ==
- She was inducted into the Victorian Honour Roll of Women in 2007.
