= Empire Building =

Empire Building may refer to:

== Places ==
- Empire Building (Melbourne)
- Empire Building (Birmingham, Alabama)
- Empire Building (Atlanta) or the J. Mack Robinson College of Business Administration Building at Georgia State University
- Empire Building (Manhattan), a skyscraper in New York City
- Empire Building (Columbus, Ohio)

== Media ==
- "Empire Building", The Bill series 7, episode 84 (1991)
- Empire Building: The Remarkable Real Life Story of Star Wars, a 1997 non-fiction book by Garry Jenkins
- Empire Building, a 2013 album by Saint Pepsi

== See also ==
- British Empire Building, an Art Deco building in New York City
- Empire Buildings, a building in Albany, Western Australia
- Empire State Building, a skyscraper in New York City
