= Austral Building =

Building

Coordinates: 37.814633°S 144.969925°E

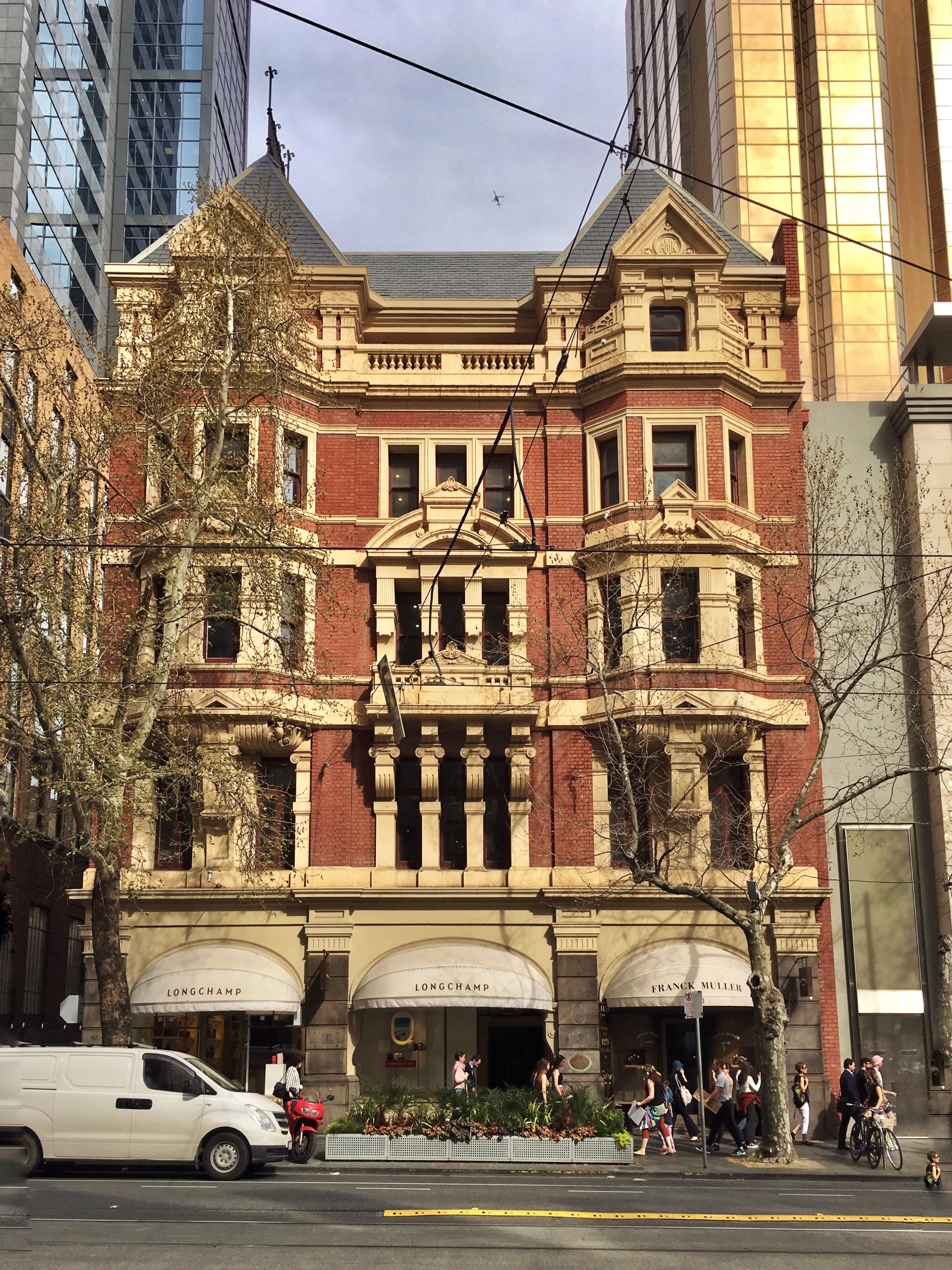
- Austral Building

General information
- Architectural style: Queen Anne style architecture
- Location: 115-119 Collins Street, Melbourne, Australia
- Completed: 1891

Design and construction
- Architect: Nahum Barnet

The Austral Building is a broadly English Queen Anne revival building located at 115-119 Collins Street, Melbourne, Australia. It was designed by noted Melbourne architect, Nahum Barnet, built in 1890, and housed noted literary and artistic tenants until well into the 20th century.

== History ==
Barnet was commissioned to design this building by magazine publisher, Alexander McKinley & Co., best known for the Melbourne Punch, as a speculative venture including shops and professional chambers, but also with purpose-built artist's studios on the fourth floor at the rear The studios were occupied by such noted practitioners as photographer JW Lindt and the painters John Mather (artist), Charles E. Gordon-Frazer, Leslie Wilkie and, in the 1920s, Alexander Colquhoun. During the 1890s and later the building was the headquarters of the Austral Salon, a pioneer Victorian club for women dedicated to their academic and artistic development. The building continued to be associated with artistic groups through the Melbourne Arts League from the 1940s to the 1980s, which encouraged young actors and artists and held exhibitions in the 1950s by such artists as Fred Williams and Donald Friend. The elegant ground floor metal framed shop fronts were added in 1909 and 1929.

== Description ==
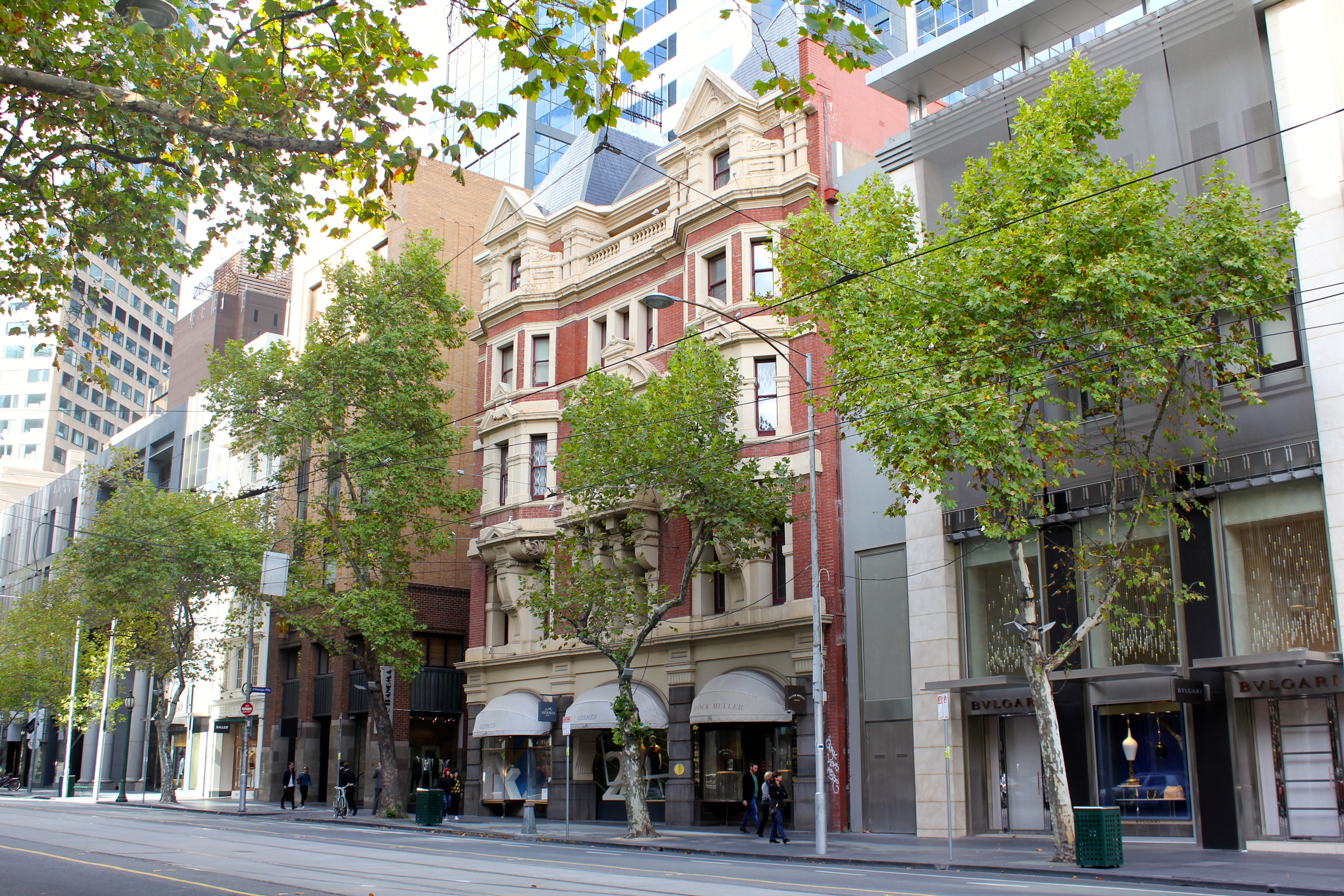
Street front view of Austral Building.

The building consists of five storeys and a basement, using plain red brick as the main wall material, with detailing provided in cement render. The front part of the building is capped with a steeply pitched slate roof. The arches of the ground floor support the bay windows on both sides, and strongly modelled bracketed window feature in the center. The main entrance is located in the central arch.

== Key influences and design approach ==
Nahum Barnet’s approach to architecture was a bold functionality of elements into a well-developed whole. He combined finely detailed and complete decorative elements with plain walls and durable massing, working across a variety of styles. He was a strong advocate for climate as a design factor and had an interest in developing an appropriate and suitable style for Australia, which he promoted in the press in the 1880s. He cleverly moved through the changing styles of architecture during his decades of practice, from Gothic Revival and Romanesque Revival to bold freestyle Classicism. The design used red brick as a main material, a hallmark of the Queen Anne, and one that was characteristic of his work in the 1900s, such as the nearby 1913 Auditorium Building.

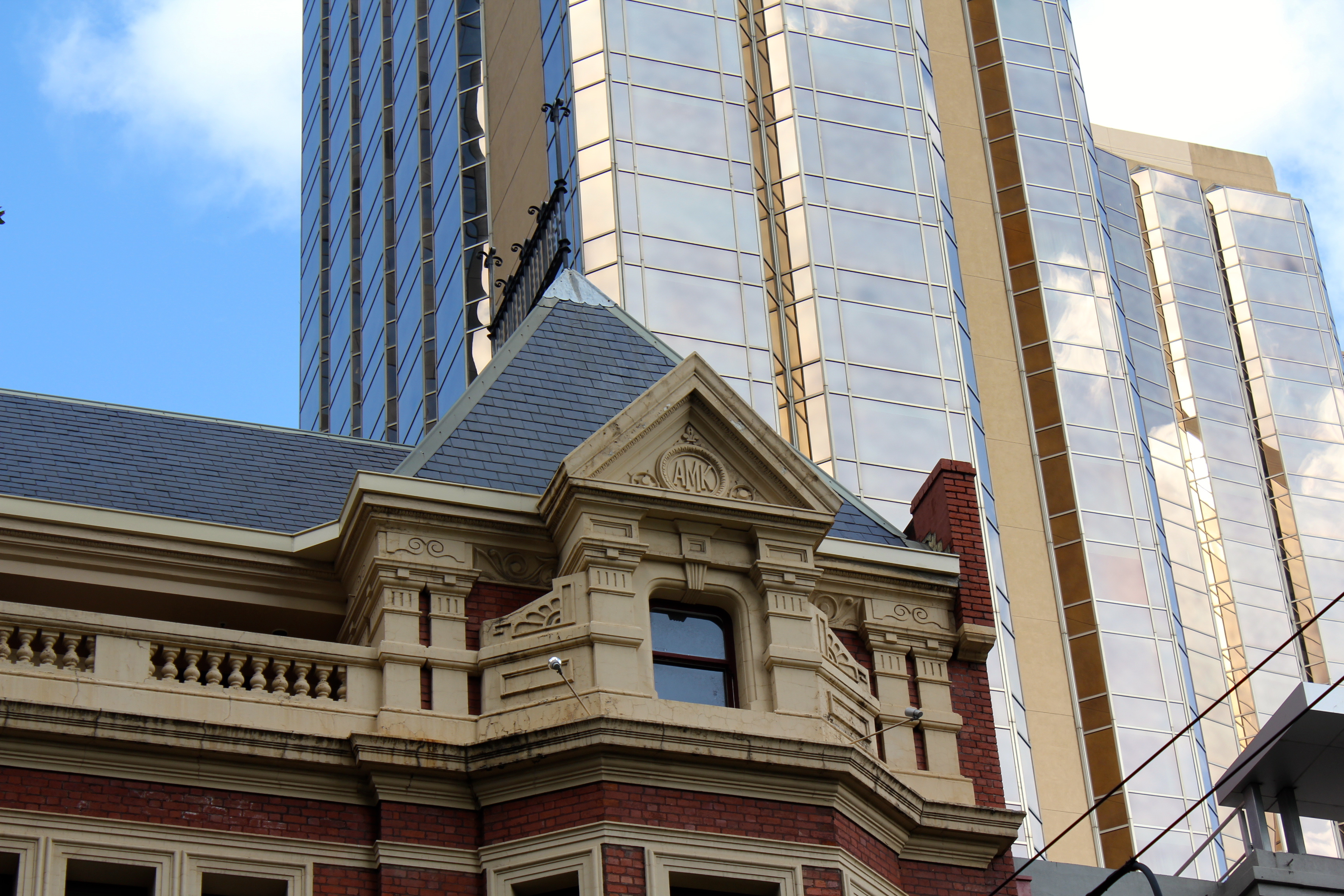
Roof detail of Austral Building.
