= Ruby Reynolds-Lewis =

Australian composer (1881–1964)

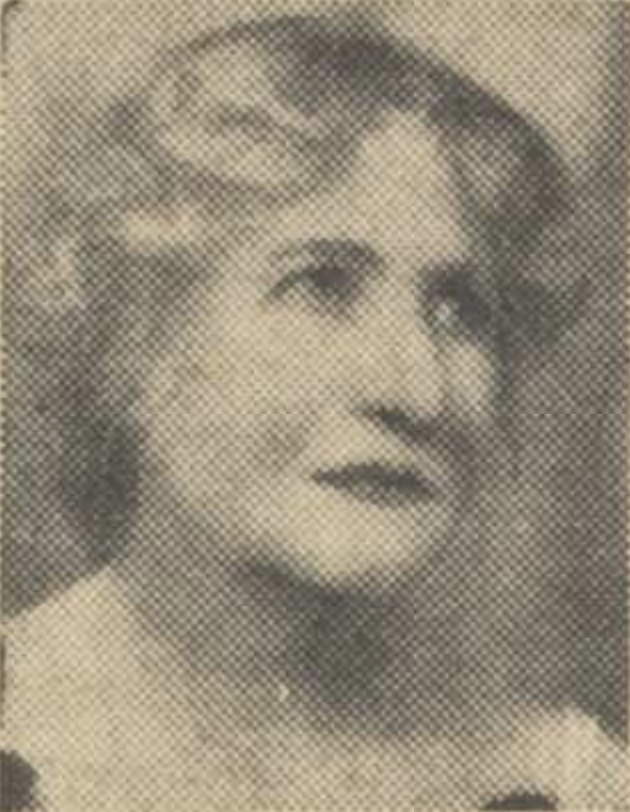
- Reynolds-Lewis in 1936
- Born: 13 November 1881; South Yarra, Australia
- Died: 13 December 1964 (aged 83); Ferntree Gully, Australia
- Occupation: Composer

Ruby Reynolds-Lewis (13 November 1881 – 13 December 1964) was an Australian composer. Her work "Foxhunt" was entered in the music event in the art competition at the 1924 Summer Olympics. She was the only Australian artist to compete in the Olympic arts competitions held from 1912 to 1948.

Reynolds-Lewis dedicated her 1919 composition "Cradle Song" to artist and musician George Hyde Pownall. Although named a "song", it was described as a piano solo and no words were published.

She was a member of the Austral Salon during the 1930s.

== Personal life ==
Born in South Yarra, Victoria, Australia, on 13 November 1881, Ruby Reynolds-Lewis was the only daughter of Philip Edward and Mary Emmeline Reynolds. Her father, an importer, died in Adelaide at the age of 34 in February 1883. In November 1901, she married Thomas Griffith Lewis at St Luke's, South Melbourne. Her husband died in 1920, leaving her to provide for their four children, Hilary, Tom, and twins Valmai and Valerie.

== Selected compositions ==
- "The Voice"
- "Cradle Song", 1919
- "Retrospection"
- "Playing the Game", 1923
- "Foxhunt", 1924
- "Wattle Gold", 1930
- "Honey Babe", 1956
