= Audrey Reader =

Australian politician (1903–1989)

Dame Audrey Reader DBE (9 December 1903 – 6 March 1989) was an Australian charity worker, who worked primarily in promoting the interests of women and of immigrants to Australia.

== Early life ==
Born Audrey Tattie Hinchliffe Nicholls in 1903 in Macedon, Victoria, Australia, the daughter of William Henry Nicholls and Mabel Tattie Hinchcliff Mallett, she married Reginald "Rex" Reader (1901–1986) in 1928; they had one daughter.

== Career ==
Audrey Reader was actively involved in the Liberal Party of Australia for more than forty years, from 1945 until her death, being a member of the State Executive for 26 years and a Federal Councillor of the party from 1955 to 1967. From 1955 to 1958, she was State Chairman of the Women's Section of the party.

From 1950 she was a member of the Good Neighbour Council of Victoria, and from 1955 she was a member of the National Council of Women; in 1958 she became an executive member of both of these bodies. In 1962 she was made Metropolitan Vice-Present of Victorian Division of the Liberal Party of Australia, and in 1964 Honorary Secretary of the National Council of Women of Victoria, which posts she held until 1967, when she represented Australia at the International Council of Women Executive Meeting in London.

From 1966 to 1972 she was the Australian convenor of the Migrating Standing Committee. In the late 1960s and early 1970s she represented the Victorian State Government on the Consumer Protection Council. In 1967 she became Honorary Secretary on the Australia Board of the National Council of Women, a post which she held for 3 years. From 1971 to 1973 she was a representative on the Commonwealth Immigration Advisory Council.

== Damehood ==
In 1978 Audrey Reader was created a Dame Commander of the Order of the British Empire (D.B.E.) for her services to women's affairs and politics.

== Sources ==
- Cadman, Kerith A (ed.), Who's who in Australia, 1988, 26th edition, The Herald and Weekly Times, Melbourne, 1988
