= Catherine Hay Thomson =

Australian journalist (c.1846–1928)

- Born: c.1846 Glasgow, Scotland
- Died: 24 July 1928 (aged 81–82); Cheltenham, Victoria, Australia
- Education: University of Melbourne
- Occupations: Journalist; Literary agent; Educator
- Known for: Undercover journalism; Co-founding the Austral Salon; Co-founding the National Council of Women of Victoria

Catherine Hay Thomson (c.1846 – 24 July 1928) was a Scottish-born Australian undercover journalist, literary agent and educator.

== Early life and education ==
Catherine Hay Thomson was born in Glasgow, educated in Melbourne and was one of the early female graduates from the University of Melbourne.

== Career ==
Thomson was principal of Queen's College, Ballarat for some time. In 1881, she opened a boarding and day school for girls in Spring Street, Melbourne.

Thomson began writing investigative articles, being referred to in The Bulletin in 1886 as "the female 'Vagabond' of Melbourne". Thomson worked as an undercover journalist, disguising herself as a man to visit brothels and taverns investigating corruption which was exposed in her newspaper articles. She investigated undercover as an attendant at the Kew Asylum, a psychiatric hospital in Melbourne and also as an assistant nurse at the Melbourne Hospital.

Thomson was one of the founders of the Austral Salon in 1890, a women’s club to foster literature, music and the arts. In 1899, Thomson and Evelyn Gough became joint proprietors of The Sun: An Australian Journal for the Home and Society. After the magazine merged with Arena in 1903 Thomson became a literary agent.

Thomson founded the National Council of Women of Victoria in 1902.

== Personal life ==
Thomson married Thomas Floyd Legge in Melbourne in 1918, aged 72. The wedding was held at the Women Writer’s Club. Thomson died in Cheltenham on 24 July 1928.

== Works ==
- Thomson, C. Hay (1909), Women writers of Australasia. The Commonwealth of Australia, s.n
- Thomson, Catherine Hay (August 1906) The Austral Salon: women's clubs in Australia. Womanhood. Vol.16 (93), p.[133]
