= Austral Salon =

Club for women interested in the fine arts in Melbourne, Australia

The Austral Salon of Music, Literature and the Fine Arts also known as the Austral Salon is a club that was established for women interested in the fine arts in Melbourne.

== Establishment ==
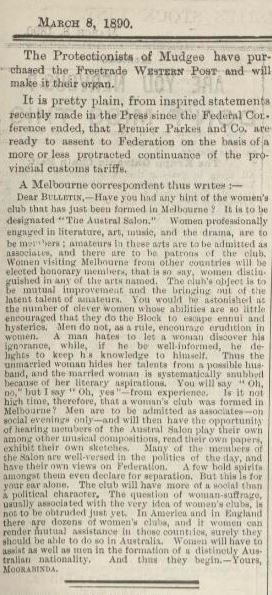
News item by Moorabinda in The Bulletin 8 March 1890 p19

The Austral Salon was founded in January 1890 by female journalists to create opportunities for women to discuss their ideas and gain intellectual stimulation. Mary Hirst Browne called a preliminary meeting in 1889, followed by the first meeting of the Austral Salon on 23 January 1890. Mrs Sidney Dickinson was elected executive vice-president, Miss Conor O’Brien, of the Evening Standard as secretary, and Miss M Hirst Browne as treasurer.

The Countess of Hopetoun, wife of the Victorian Governor, later first Governor-General of Australia, was the Salon’s first Patron. Journalist Agnes Murphy, poet Ada Cambridge and journalist Catherine Hay Thomson were among the founding members of the Austral Salon. Full membership was restricted to professional women ‘who were actively engaged in literary, artistic, scientific, or dramatic work,’ and Associates, who could be men or women.

The club was originally located at 115-119 Collins Street, Melbourne in the Austral Building.

== Activities ==
Before the opening of the Melbourne Conservatorium of Music the Austral club helped aspiring musicians. Artists such as Ada Crossley, Amy Castles, Florence Austral, Marjorie Lawrence and Nellie Melba performed at the Austral Salon. The Salon undertook many philanthropic projects.

In 1891, the Austral Salon raised money to send Tilly Aston, a young blind girl, to University. She became a writer and a teacher before becoming head of the Victorian Education Department's School for the Blind.

The Salon was one of the first four groups to affiliate with the National Council of Women of Victoria in 1902. The first official meeting of the Arts and Crafts Society of Victoria took place at the Austral Salon on 27 May 1908.

The Salon continues as The Austral Salon of Music, a Melbourne society committed to encouraging young musicians that holds regular recitals at St Peters Church, East Melbourne.

== Selected members ==
- Margaret Baskerville, sculptor
- Jennings Carmichael, poet
- Ethel Castilla, poet
- Agnes G. Murphy, writer and journalist
- Hilda Rix Nichola, artist
- Ruby Reynolds-Lewis, composer
- Margaret Evelyn Stanley, patron
- Violet Teague
- Catherine Hay Thomson, journalist
- Janie Wilkinson Whyte, impressionist artist

== See also ==
- Austral Building
