= The Jewish Herald (Melbourne) =

The Jewish Herald, later The Australian Jewish Herald, was an Australian newspaper published in Melbourne, aimed at the Jewish community of that city. "First published in Melbourne in 1877 [sic], in 1953 it was the oldest foreign-language paper in Australia." Its equivalent in Sydney was the Jewish Times.

First published in December 1879 as a monthly magazine edited by Rev. Elias Blaubaum of St Kilda Hebrew congregation, it was favorably reviewed in other Australian colonies. It was published fortnightly from 4 June 1880 to at least 20 February 1920. The editor from 1904 was Moses Moses.

On 7 March 1880 a group of influential Jews including Nahum Barnet and Rev. Elias Blaubaum, met at Gunsler's Café to chart a future course for the newspaper.

An article in the issue of September 1897 remarked on the similarity of the Jewish faith and Socialism, citing Professor Flint: both "vigorously condemned the two greatest scourges of humanity: war and oppression of the weak and feeble".

Newman Rosenthal was editor for Fink Press in 1925. He was at one time employed by the Victorian Education Department, but became science master at (Catholic) Xavier College, where he also taught the Hebrew language.

In 1933, the Jewish Herald joined with Australian Leben (the first Yiddish newspaper founded in 1931 by printer David Altshul) and Jewish Weekly News. The merger was shortlived, as in 1935 Newman Rosenthal, editor of the Herald, re-established it as a separate publication. The Australian Jewish Herald was published weekly from 23 May 1935 to 12 January 1968. Richard Flantz was a Zionist youth leader in Melbourne before taking up a journalism position in Israel in 1959, later becoming News Editor for English broadcasts by Kol Yisrael and Kol Zion Lagolah. He also worked as a Hebrew–English translator.

Maurice Adams (c.1915–1985) was chief NSW representative of the paper, a contributor to ABC political affairs programs and author of several CAB booklets. He dropped his "Herald" commitment in 1952 to become editor of the Hebrew Standard of Australasia.

Mark M. Braham was a Jewish commentator and controversialist, noted for his criticism of the modern state of Israel. He emigrated from England some time around 1949, and set up a hosiery business in Kings Cross. He had a position as treasurer of the Sir Moses Montefiore Home, and represented that organization on the NSW Jewish Board of Deputies, tasked with investigating excessive prices being charged for kosher meat. He had a bylined column in the Jewish Times from January 1965 and "As I See It" in the Jewish Herald from the same month. He was a regular contributor to The Bridge, an Australian Jewish quarterly. He was the author of the book Jews Don't Hate, which critic George Stern characterized as Braham's anti-Zionist rant, long on polemics and short on rational thought.

David Lederman was the owner and last editor of the paper. After the Herald folded he left Australia for Israel.

The newspaper was last published on 2 August 1968, following a boycott organised by the Victorian Jewish Board of Deputies and its president, Nathan Beller. This action was in response to the newspaper's publication of an anti-Zionist article by Mark Braham. Beller appears to assume that by publishing Braham's column, Lederman was endorsing his views.

Braham resigned from the paper in an attempt to save the newspaper. His last published statement statement included the words

Truth will not be silenced. The Jewish people are not going to be permitted to hear the truth from a Jew, identified with his people, conscious of the burden and privilege of his heritage. They will hear it from the anti-Semites—words spoken, not in love, but in hatred. Jewish leaders, intoxicated with power, have not learned from our history. "Victory cannot tolerate truth" (Nachman of Breslov).

The last issue of the Australian Jewish Herald was on 12 January 1968, leaving the Jewish Times as the oldest Australian Jewish newspaper.

== Digitisation ==
The Jewish Herald has been digitised from 1879 to 1920 and is available online through Trove, a service of the National Library of Australia. Most issues of its successor, the Australian Jewish Herald, from 23 May 1935 to its last issue of 12 January 1968 have been digitized and may be accessed via Trove.
