= Nahum Barnet =

Australian architect (1855–1931)

Nahum Barnet (16 August 1855 – 1 September 1931) was an architect working in Melbourne, Victoria, Australia, during the Victorian and Edwardian periods, best known for his extensive legacy of commercial buildings in Melbourne's CBD, as well as his last design, the Melbourne Synagogue.

== Practice ==
Nahum Barnet began practicing as an architect in 1879, and was an early advocate of red brick and terracotta, then gaining popularity in England, rather than the ubiquitous stucco or stone. By the late 1880s he had produced some major works, including Rosaville, an unusual and highly elaborate two storey terrace in Carlton, the Renaissance Revival style Her Majesty's Theatre (1886), as well as the Moss White & Co Tobacco Warehouse (1888) and the Austral Building (1891) in Collins Street, amongst the first to introduce the red brick Queen Anne style to the city's streetscapes.

Barnet was active in Jewish life like his father; when it first began publication in 1880, he was editor of Melbourne's Jewish Herald. In 1882 he was elected secretary of the Anglo-Jewish Association, and was honorary architect to the Jewish Philanthropic Society, doing work at the Jewish almshouses (later the Montefiore homes). He was to develop an extensive Jewish clientele, designing many houses and a number of tobacco warehouses and factories, and his first major commission, Rosaville in Carlton, was for Abraham Harris, a prominent member of the Jewish Community.

== Early commissions ==
Unlike some other boom era architects, Barnet weathered the economic crash of the 1890s, and became one of the most prolific commercial architects in Melbourne in the Edwardian era after 1900. He designed at least 32 offices, shops, warehouses and theatres in the central city between 1900 and 1925, ending up with various of his designs near each other. For instance the Gothic 1913 Francis & Co Chemist at 280-282 Bourke Street is right next to the more abstract Roughton & Co built the next year, and two doors down was the elaborate Wertheim showroom built 10 years earlier, and the Melba and Britannia Theatres, both 1912, were across the street. The 1891 Austral Building in Collins Street was a few doors up from his 1905 surgery for Dr Barrett at no 127, the 1913 YWCA was just around the corner in Russell Street, the 1913 Auditorium Building is half a block further down Collins Street, and Clyde House, also 1913, is across the street from that.

== Notable works ==
Notable works by Barnet after 1900 include a series of designs that were variations on the local version of the Romanesque Revival, combined with elements of the Queen Anne, characterised by the use of red brick and arches, often with projecting bays; examples include Mason, Firth & McCutcheon Printers in Bank Place, Love & Lewis in Bourke Street, and the Auditorium Building, which included a concert hall at ground level.

=== Style ===
Barnet embellished some of his essays in this style with Art Nouveau details, relatively rare in Melbourne, including Alston's Corner, the Paton Building, though most decorative elements were flowing floral designs. The Vienna Café was a popular business purchased by restaurateur Antony J Lucas who in 1915 planned to expand it into adjoining premises leased by W. H. Glen and Co. Pty Ltd., music sellers, appointing Barnet, to make it the Café Australia, "the most up to date in the Commonwealth both as regards furnishings and cuisine". The Prairie Style interior design was the work of Marion Mahony Griffin.

The striking Young Women's Christian Association clubrooms in Russell Street (demolished) was more eclectic, combining red brick, projecting squat turrets and a high stylised parapet. In this period he also designed in other styles, including the Arts & Crafts influenced Florida Mansions in St Kilda Road, an early block of flats (demolished), the Edwardian Baroque of the Empire Arcade and Wertheims, and stylised Gothic of Francis & Co. His last work was the Baroque Revival Melbourne Synagogue (1929) in South Yarra.

== Ubiquity ==
The claim that there "was not a street in the Melbourne central business district where a Barnet building could not be found" was coined by his friend Isaac Selby and reiterated in Barnet's obituary in The Argus in 1931. The obituary relates that when challenged with the street "Carpentaria Place" (a short street opposite the Windsor Hotel, now pedestrianised), the reply was "You are wrong. You have overlooked the cabman's shelter." Barnet had designed this in 1898, and it still exists, though relocated to Yarra Park along Brunton Avenue some time in the interwar years.

== Personal life ==
Barnet was born in the Melbourne Hospital on Swanston Street, the son of newly arrived Isaac Barnet, a Polish-born pawnbroker, tobacconist, and later a noted jeweller. Isaac was an active member of Melbourne's Jewish community throughout his life, as well as civic affairs, becoming a Councillor in the City of Collingwood in 1879.

In 1885 Barnet married Ada Rose Marks in the Great Synagogue, Sydney; they had four daughters and from the mid-1890s lived next door to his parents in Alma Road St Kilda. He died at home in St Kilda on 1 September 1931.

== List of works ==
- 1883 Rosaville, 46 Drummond Street, Carlton
- 1886 Her Majesty's Theatre, 199-227 Exhibition Street, Melbourne
- 1887 Working Men's College (1st stage), 124 La Trobe Street, Melbourne (with Terry & Oakden)
- 1888 Fergus & Mitchell Warehouse (later Robur Tea), 28 Clarendon Street, Southbank (with engineer John Granger)
- 1888 Moss White & Co Tobacco Warehouse (later Gill Memorial Home), 217-219 A'Beckett Street, Melbourne
- 1889 Liverpool (large house), 36 Princes Street, St Kilda
- 1891 Austral Building, 115-119 Collins Street, Melbourne
- 1891 Voltaire & Racine, a three storey terrace pair, 73-75 Fitzroy Street, St Kilda (demolished)
- 1892 Rosenthal Aronson & Co (later Slatters), 275-277 Lonsdale Street, Melbourne
- 1893 Clarkes Building, 275-281 Lonsdale Street, Melbourne
- 1897 Heimath, Lansell Road, Toorak (demolished?)
- 1898 Cabman's Shelter, Carpentaria Street, City (now in Yarra Park, Jolimont)
- 1900 Bernard's Swiss Portrait Studio, 323-5 Bourke Street Melbourne (demolished 1923)
- 1901 Wm Cameron Brothers Tobacco Warehouse, 435-447 Swanston Street, Melbourne (demolished 1970s)
- 1902 Chinese Mission Church, 119-125 Little Bourke Street
- 1902 Melbourne Sports Depot, 55-57 Elizabeth Street (2 floors added in 1925)
- 1902 Clauscen's Furnishing Arcade (later Love & Lewis), 194-196 Bourke Street Melbourne (demolished 1970s)
- 1903 St Kilda Synagogue (new front), Charnwood Grove, St Kilda (demolished c1930)
- 1903 Wertheim showrooms and offices, 294-296 Bourke Street (demolished 1932)
- 1903 Alcock & Co, 155-157 Elizabeth Street, Melbourne (demolished 1930s)
- 1903 Mason, Firth & McCutcheon Printers, 11-19 Bank Place, Melbourne
- 1904 Altson's Corner, ne corner of Collins and Elizabeth Streets, Melbourne
- 1905 Paton Building, 115-117 Elizabeth Street, Melbourne
- 1905 Empire Arcade, 290 Flinders Street, Melbourne
- 1905 Dr Barrett's Chambers, 103 Collins Street Melbourne (demolished 1988)
- 1905c House and surgery for Dr Barrett, 127 Collins Street (demolished 1930s)
- 1906 St Kilda Sea Baths, St Kilda beach (destroyed by fire 1926)
- 1907 Armstrong House, 217-219 Queen Street, Melbourne
- 1909 Wertheim Piano Factory (later GTV-9), Bendigo Street Richmond
- 1909 Aberdeen House, ne corner of Collins and King Streets, Melbourne (demolished 1989)
- 1909 Barnet Glass Rubber Co., 289-299 Swanston Street, Melbourne (later doubled in width and a floor added, and details removed, now Legacy House)
- 1911 London Hotel, Elizabeth Street, Melbourne
- 1911 The Kalazoic (Church Brothers P/L), 238 Elizabeth Street, Melbourne (demolished 1970s)
- 1911-12 Melba and Britannia Theatres, 283-289 Bourke Street, Melbourne (demolished 1970s)
- 1911c Zerchos College, 157 Collins Street, Melbourne (demolished 1980s)
- 1911c Norman Bros, 60-62 Elizabeth Street, Melbourne (demolished 1970s)
- 1912 Display Block, 313-315 Little Collins Street, Melbourne
- 1912 Majestic Theatre, 172 Flinders Street Melbourne (with Klingender & Alsop, demolished 1980s)
- 1913 Auditorium Building, 167-173 Collins Street, Melbourne
- 1913 Young Women's Christian Association, Russell Street, Melbourne (demolished 1970s)
- 1913 Connibere Grieve and Connibere, (later Reliance House), 301-311 Flinders Lane, Melbourne
- 1913 Francis & Co Chemist, 280-282 Bourke Street, Melbourne
- 1914 Roughton & Co, 284-288 Bourke Street, Melbourne
- 1914 Elizabeth House, nw corner Elizabeth & Little Collins Streets, Melbourne (with Grainger & Little architects, demolished 1930s)
- 1915 Clyde House, 182 Collins Street, Melbourne
- 1916 Florida Mansions, 601 St Kilda Road, Melbourne (demolished 1982)
- 1919 Cann's Department Store, 135-137 Swanston Street, corner Little Collins Streets. Four floors added 1935.
- 1922 Swanston House, 163 Swanston Street, Melbourne
- 1925 CML Building, 499 Dean Street, Albury, NSW
- 1925 Lancashire House (for J. & B. Sniders), 36-50 Flinders Lane, Melbourne (demolished 1970s)
- 1929 Melbourne Synagogue, Toorak Road, South Yarra.

== Gallery ==
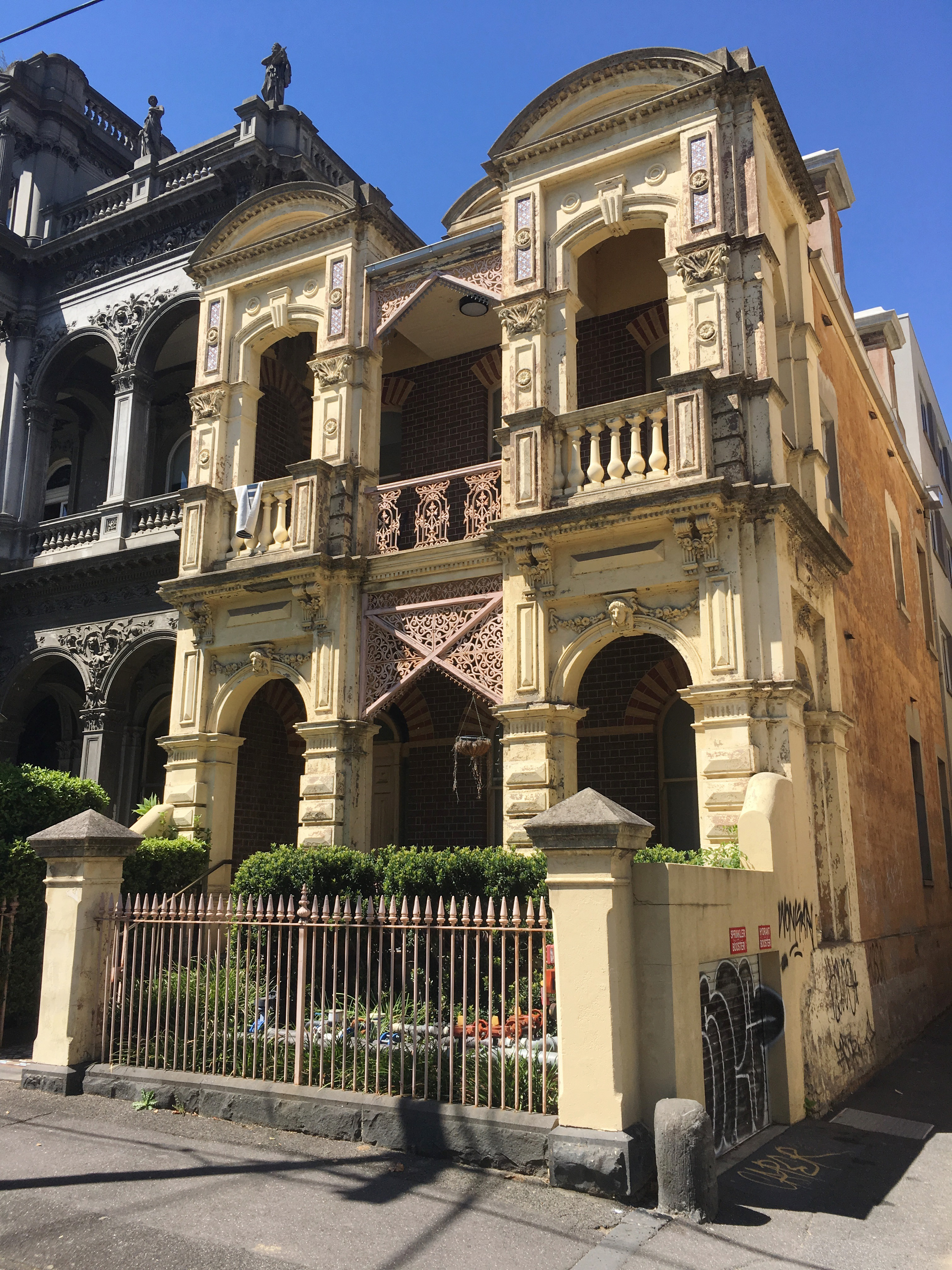
Rosaville, Carlton, 1883

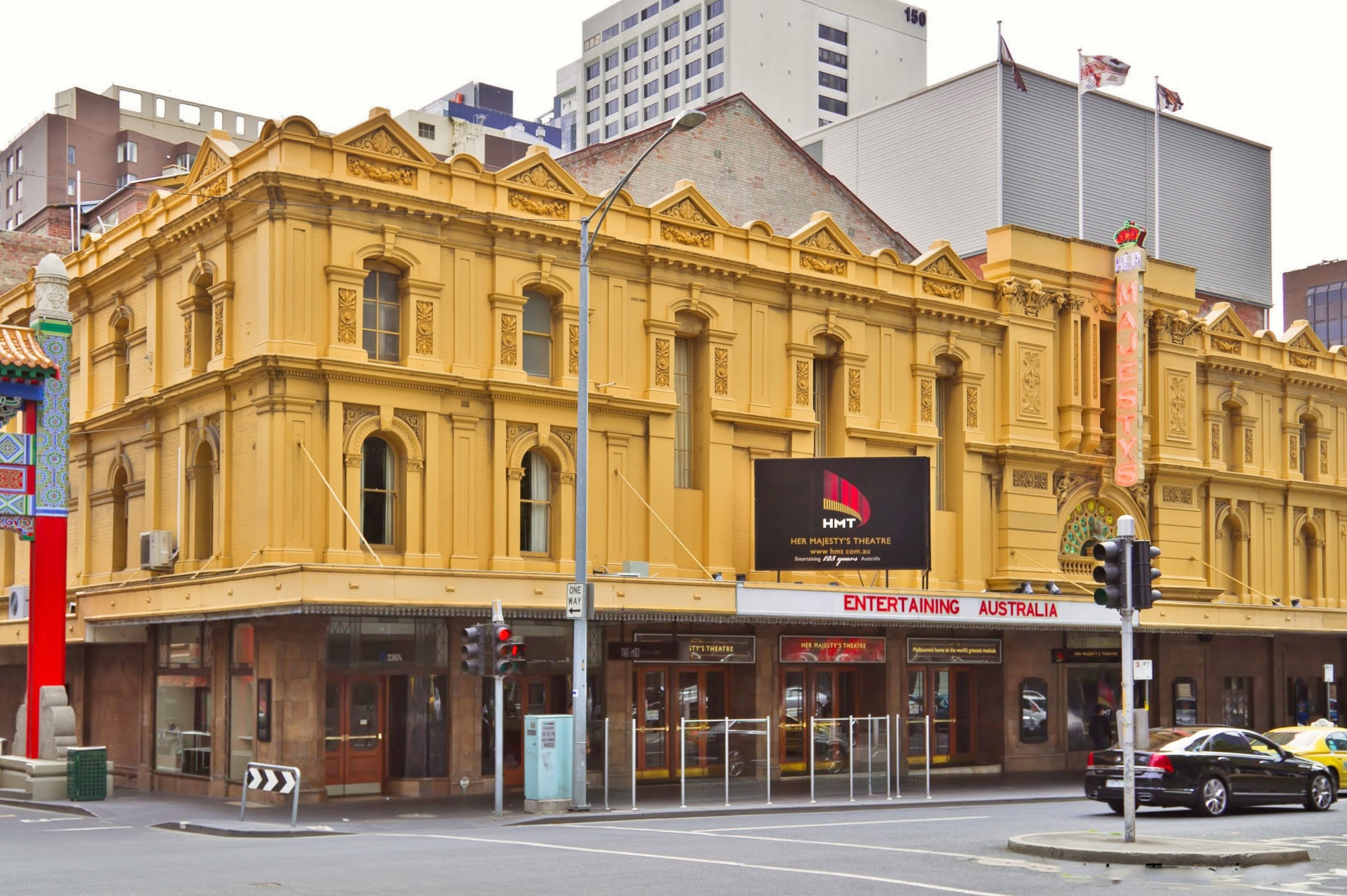
Her Majetsy's Theatre, 1886

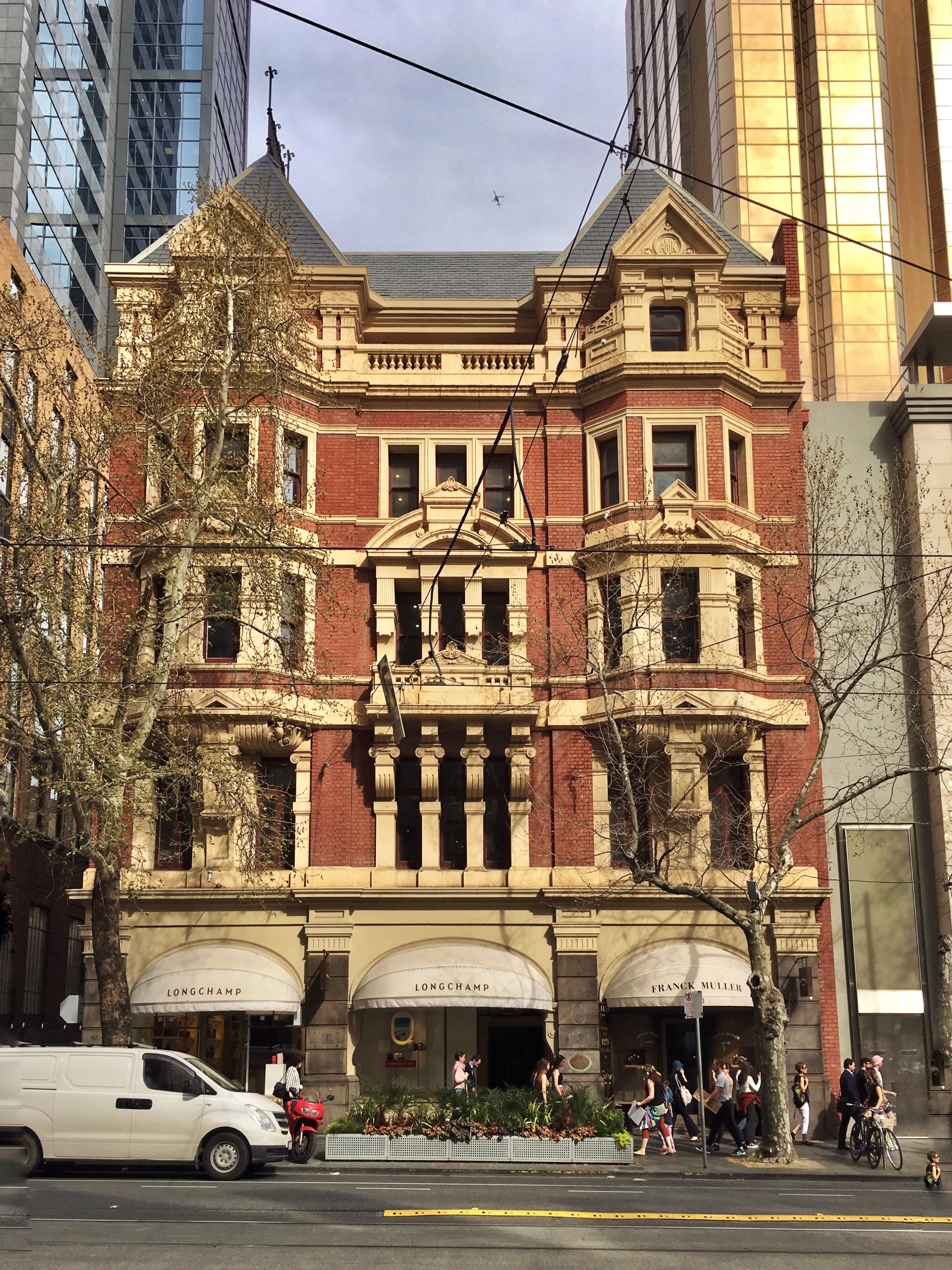
Austral Building, 1891

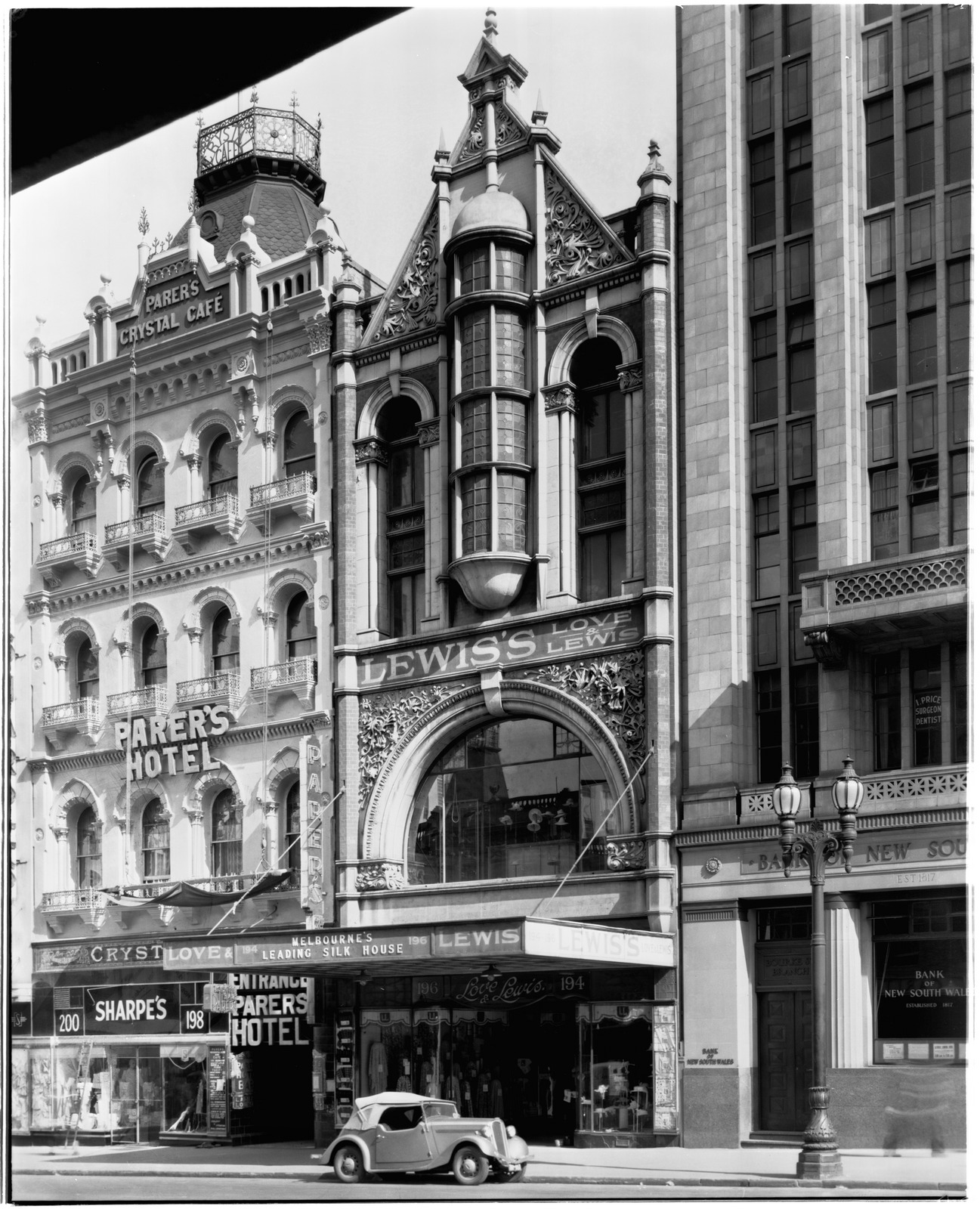
Clauscen's (later Love & Lewis), Bourke Street, 1902

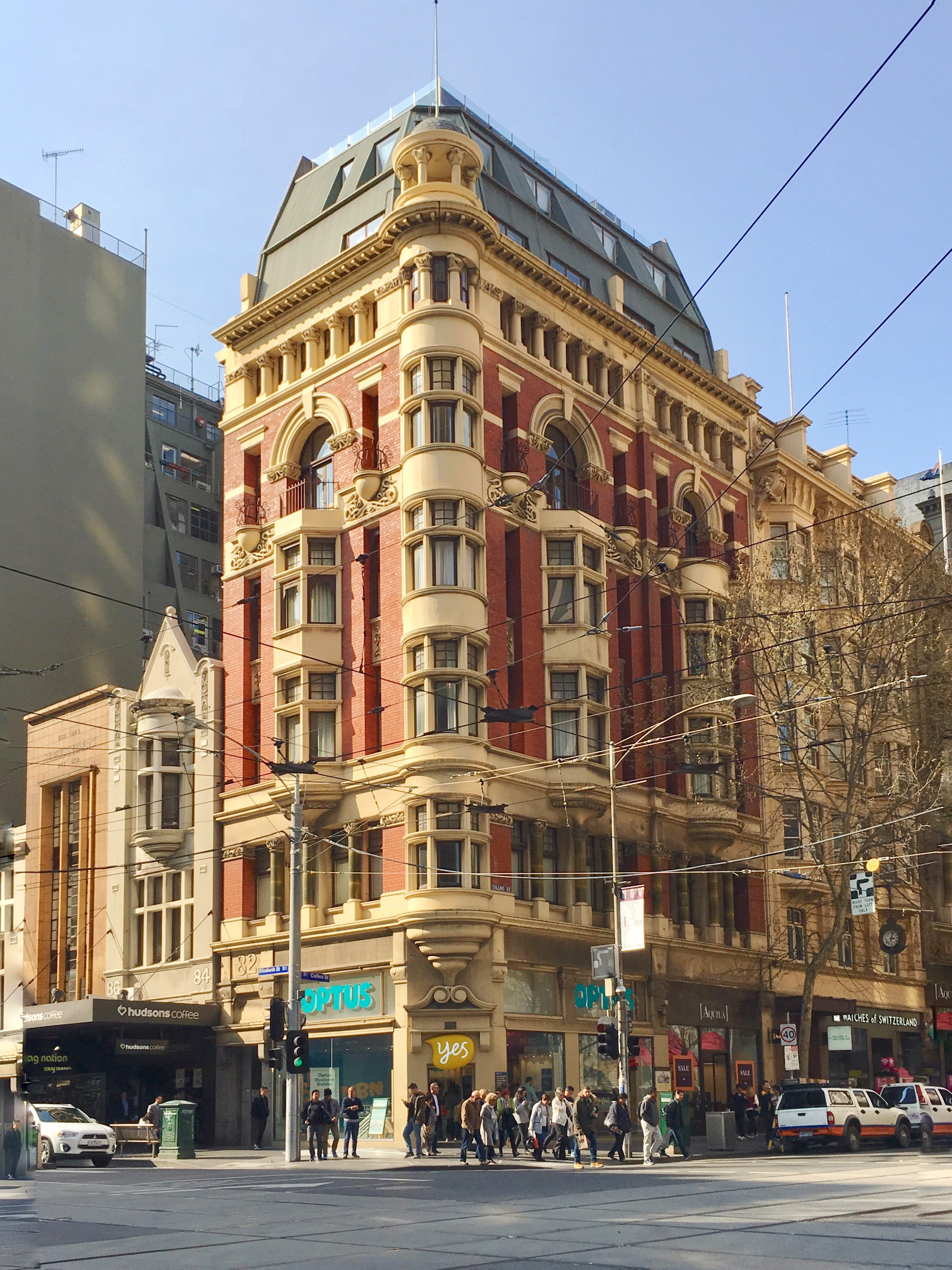
Altson's Corner, 1904

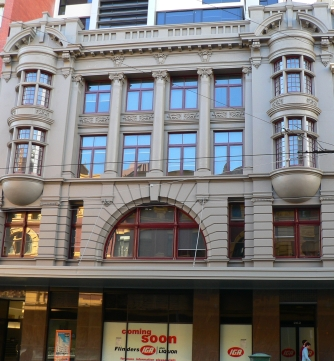
The Empire Building, 1905

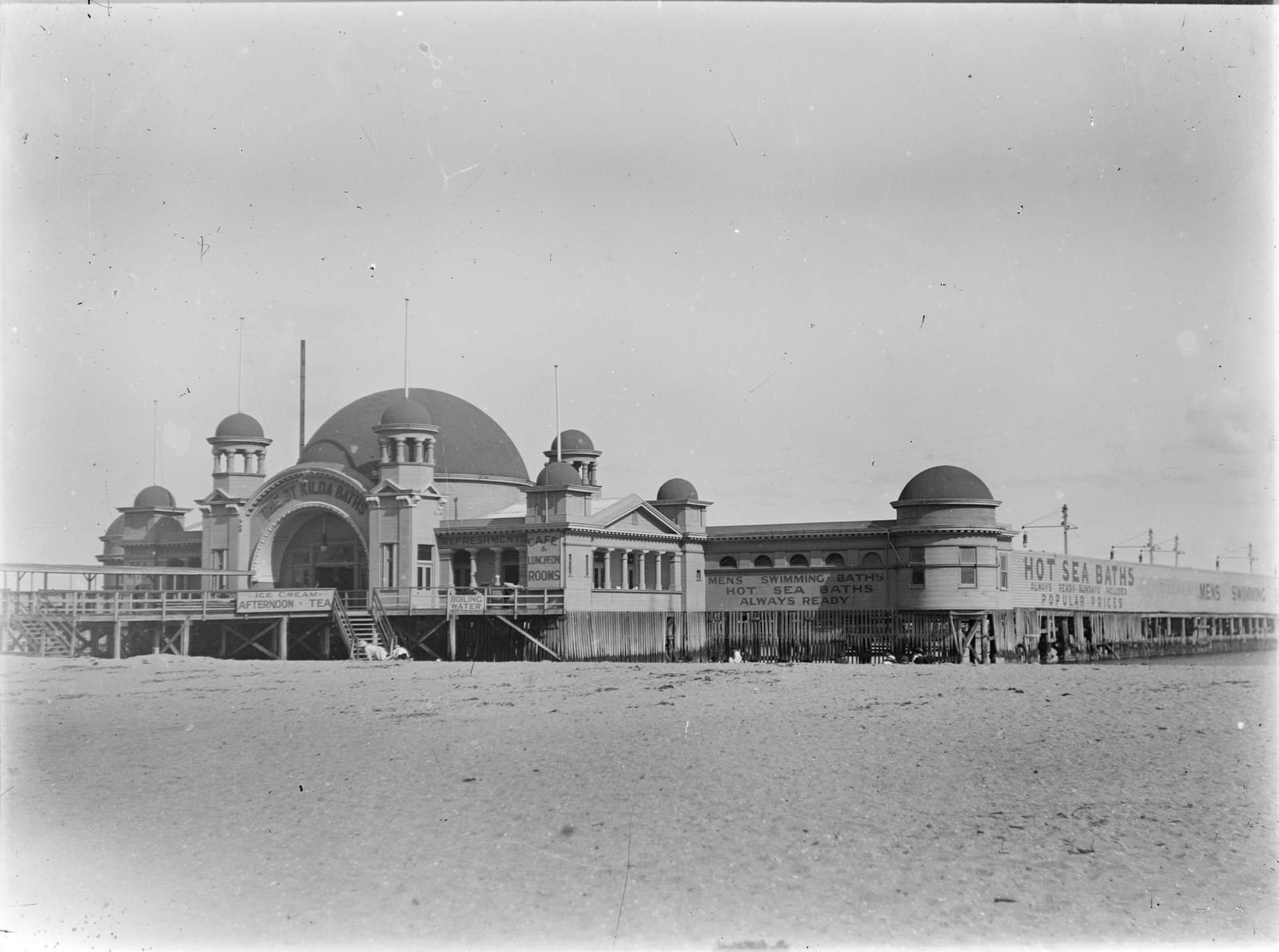
St Kilda Sea Baths, 1906

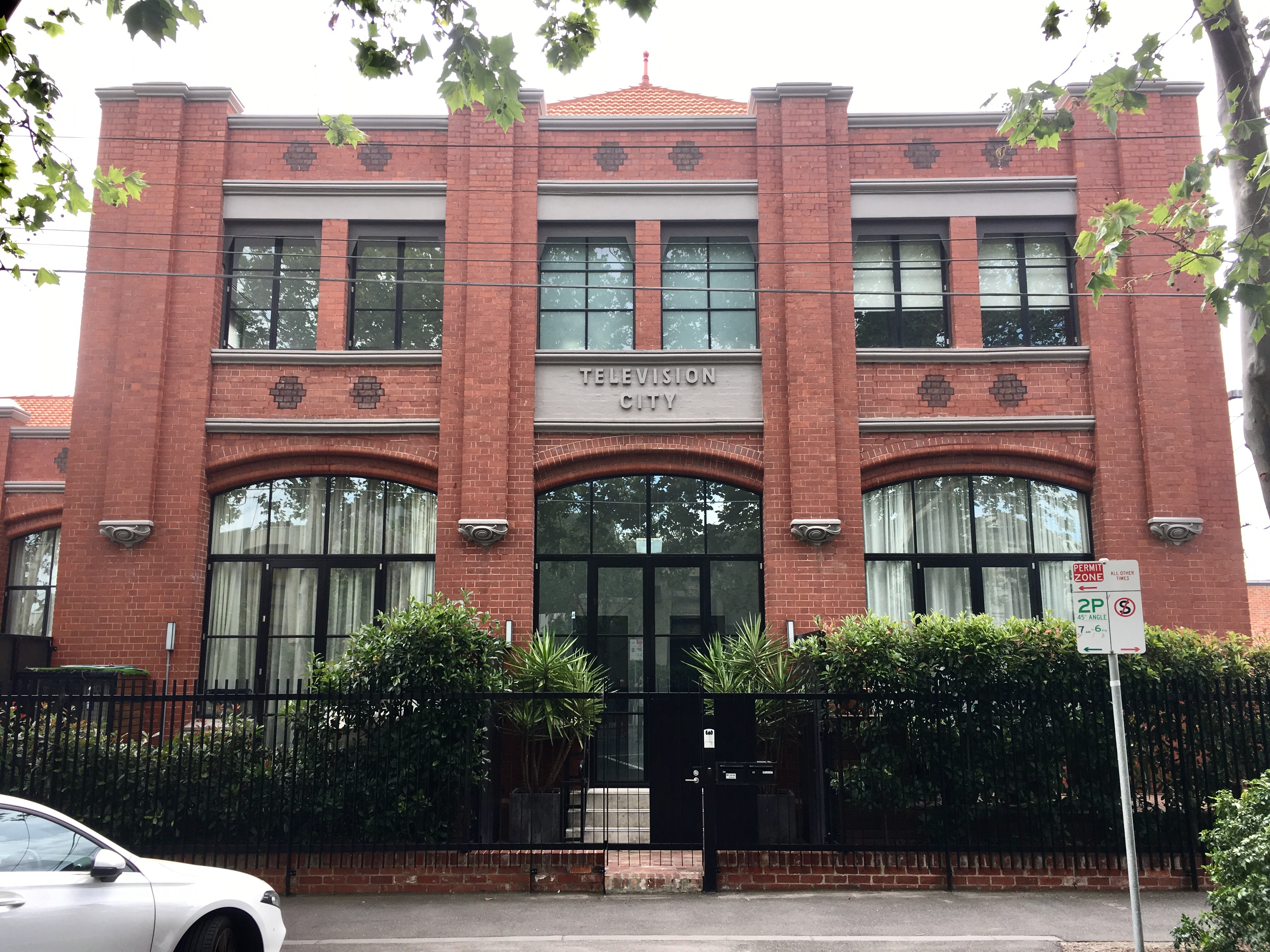
Wertheim Factory Richmond, 1909

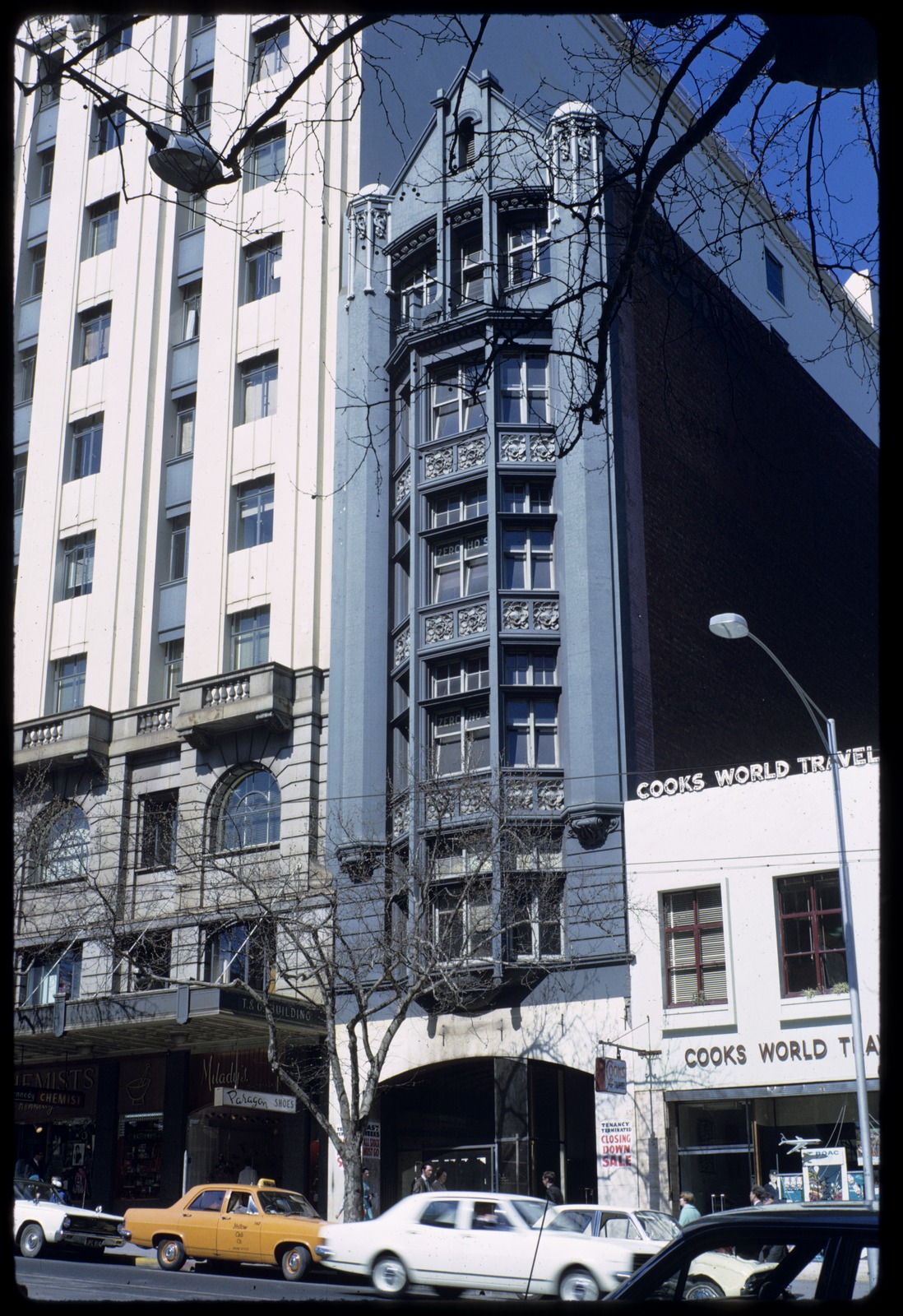
Zerchos College, 1911

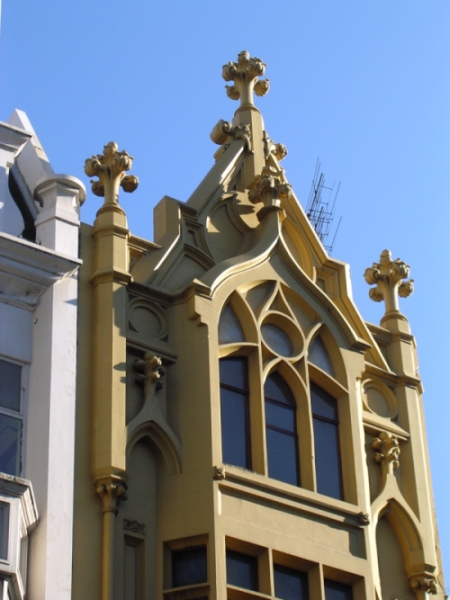
Francis & Co, 1913

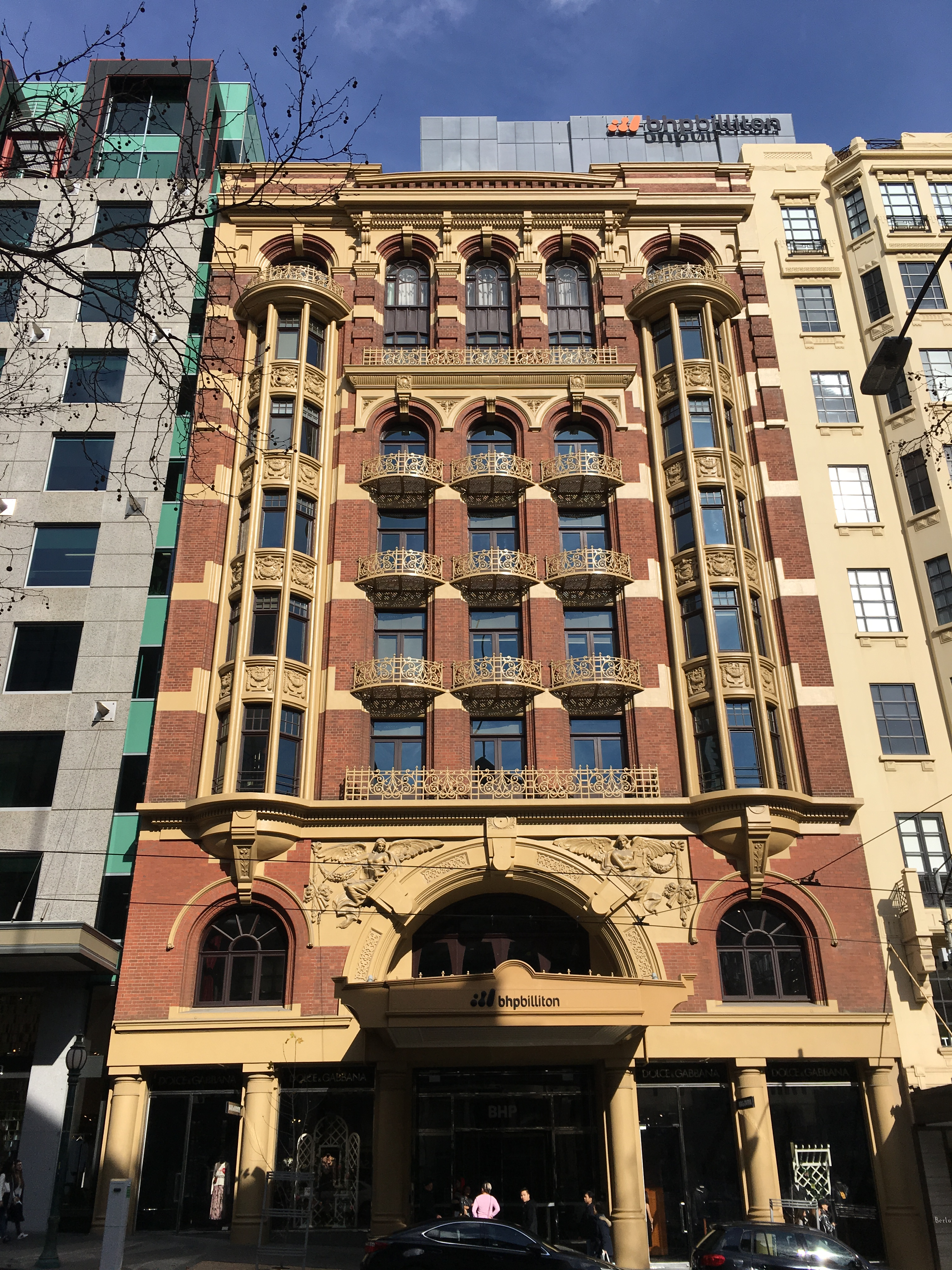
Auditorium Building, 1913

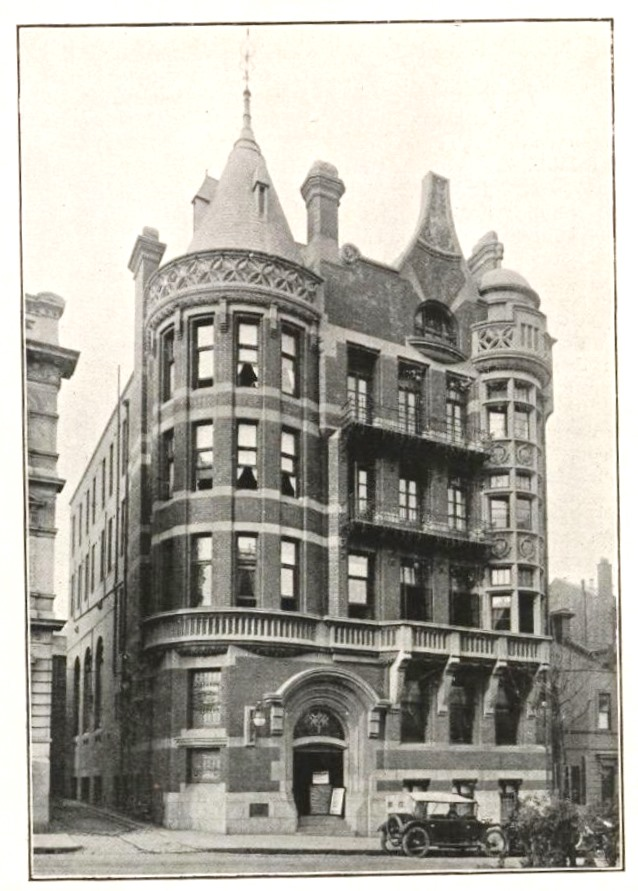
YWCA Russell Street, 1913

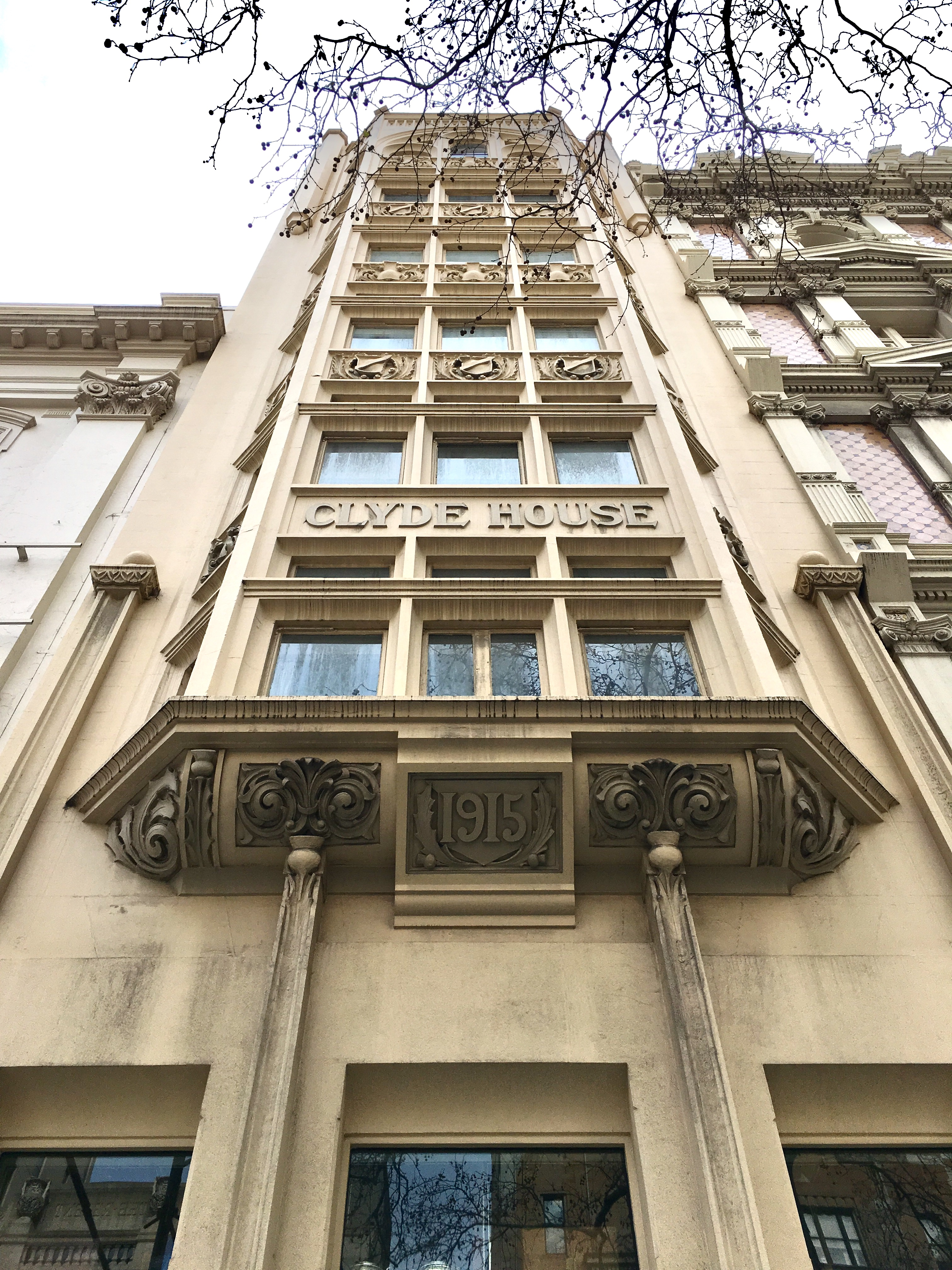
Clyde House, 1915

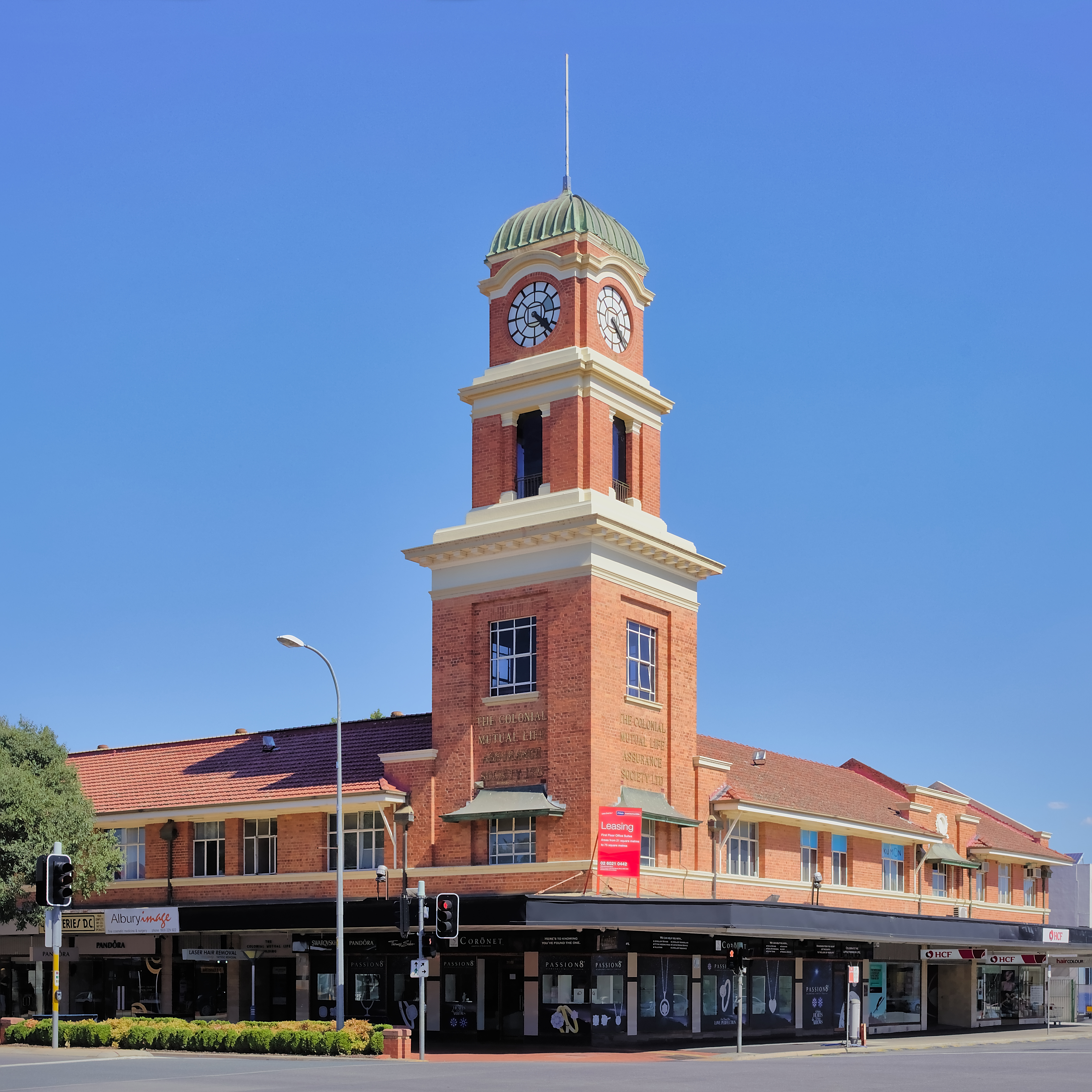
CML Building, Albury, 1925

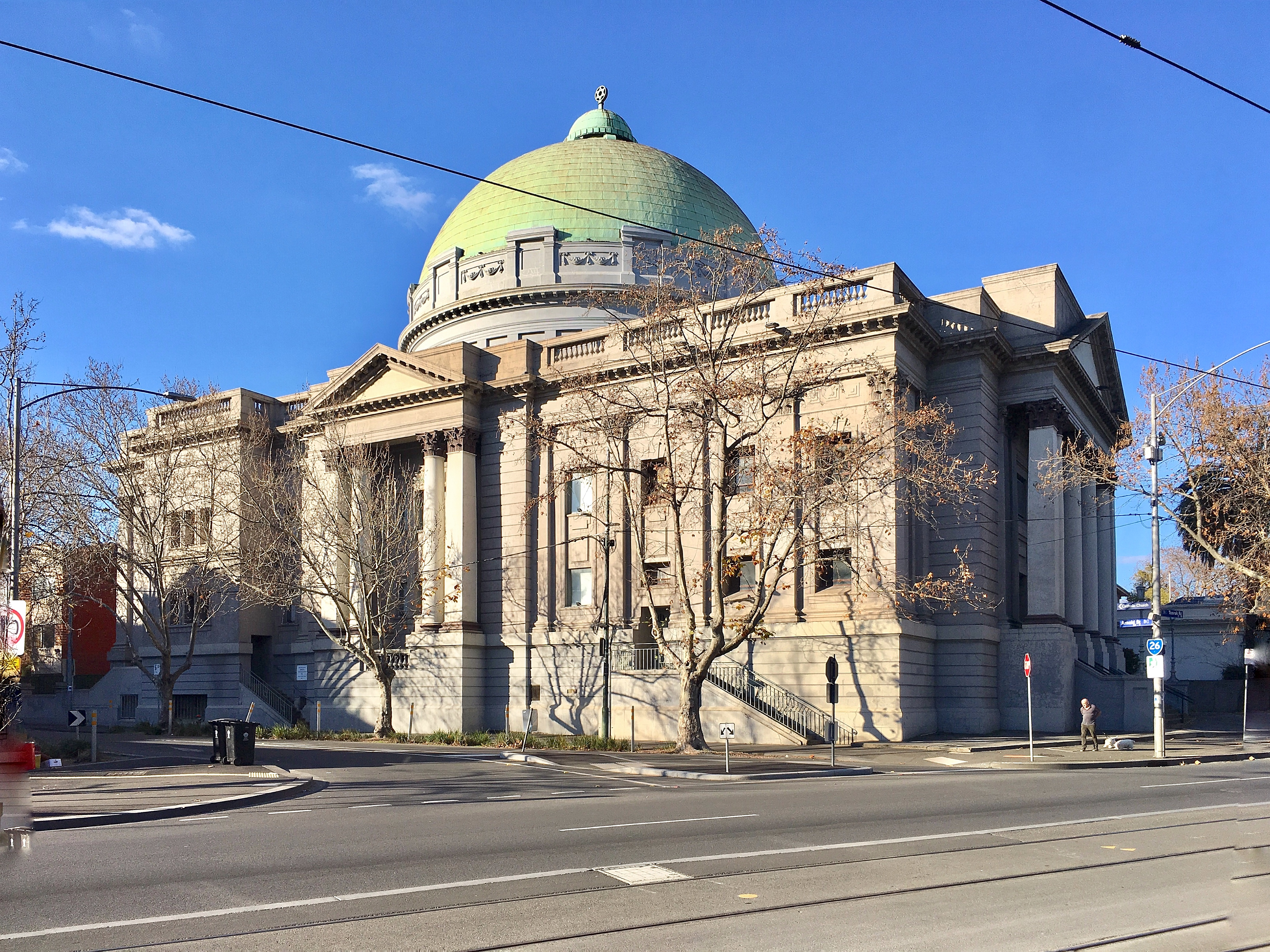
Melbourne Synagogue, 1929
