= Altson's Corner =

Coordinates: 37°48′57″S 144°57′51″E

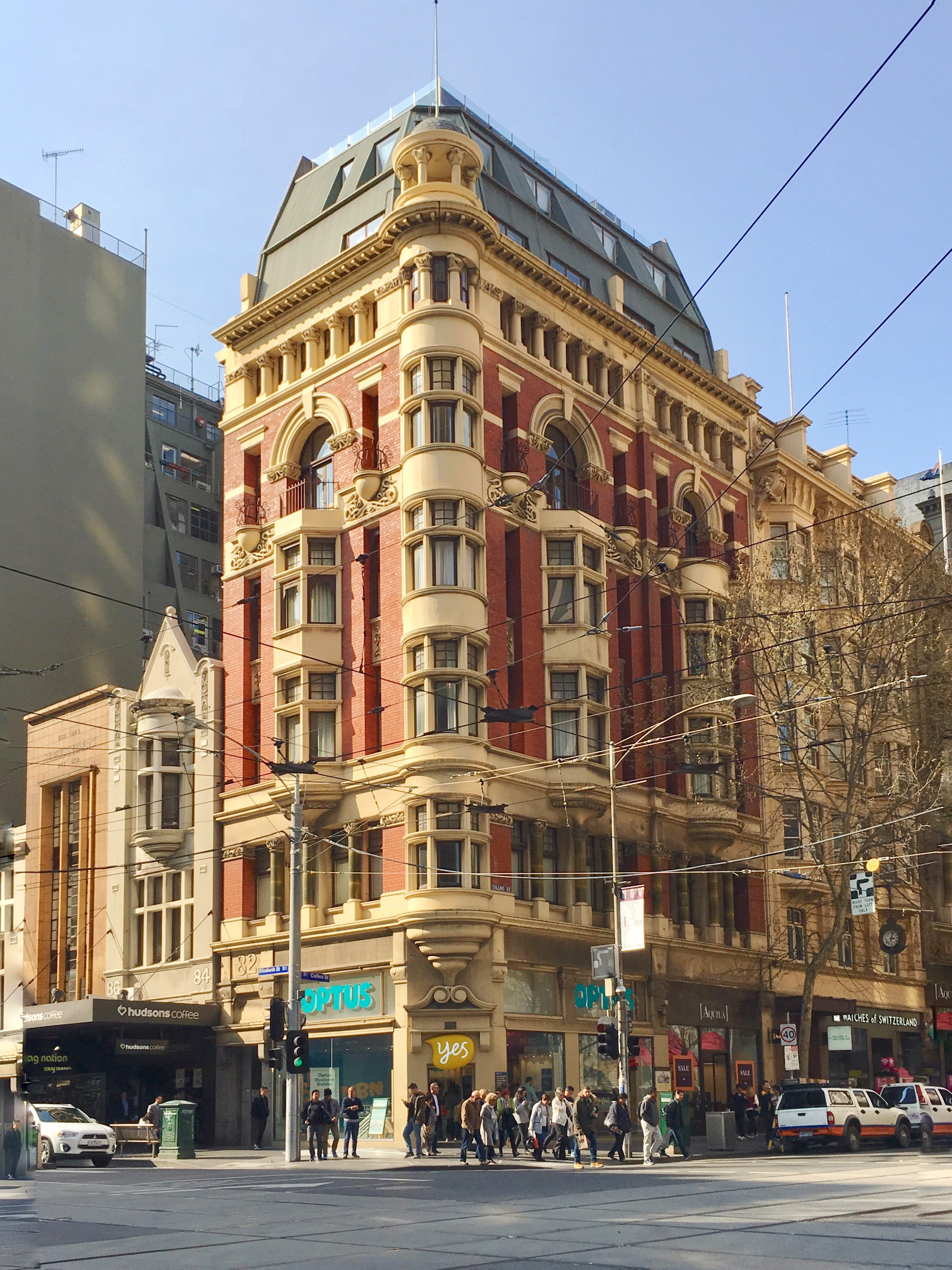
Altson's Corner in 2017

Altson's Corner is a heritage listed Edwardian building located on the corner of Elizabeth Street and Collins St in CBD of Melbourne, Australia, built for tobacconist Richard Altson in 1904, and extended in 1914.

== History ==
There is a plaque on the building attesting that the first brick building in Melbourne was erected here in 1839. It was owned by Alexander Brunton, and from 1840 housed the haberdashery and home of Michael Cashmore, one of the earliest Jewish settlers in Melbourne, and it was known as both Cashmore's corner and Brunton's corner. Until 1889 when the street numbers were changed, it had the enviable address of 1 Collins Street East.

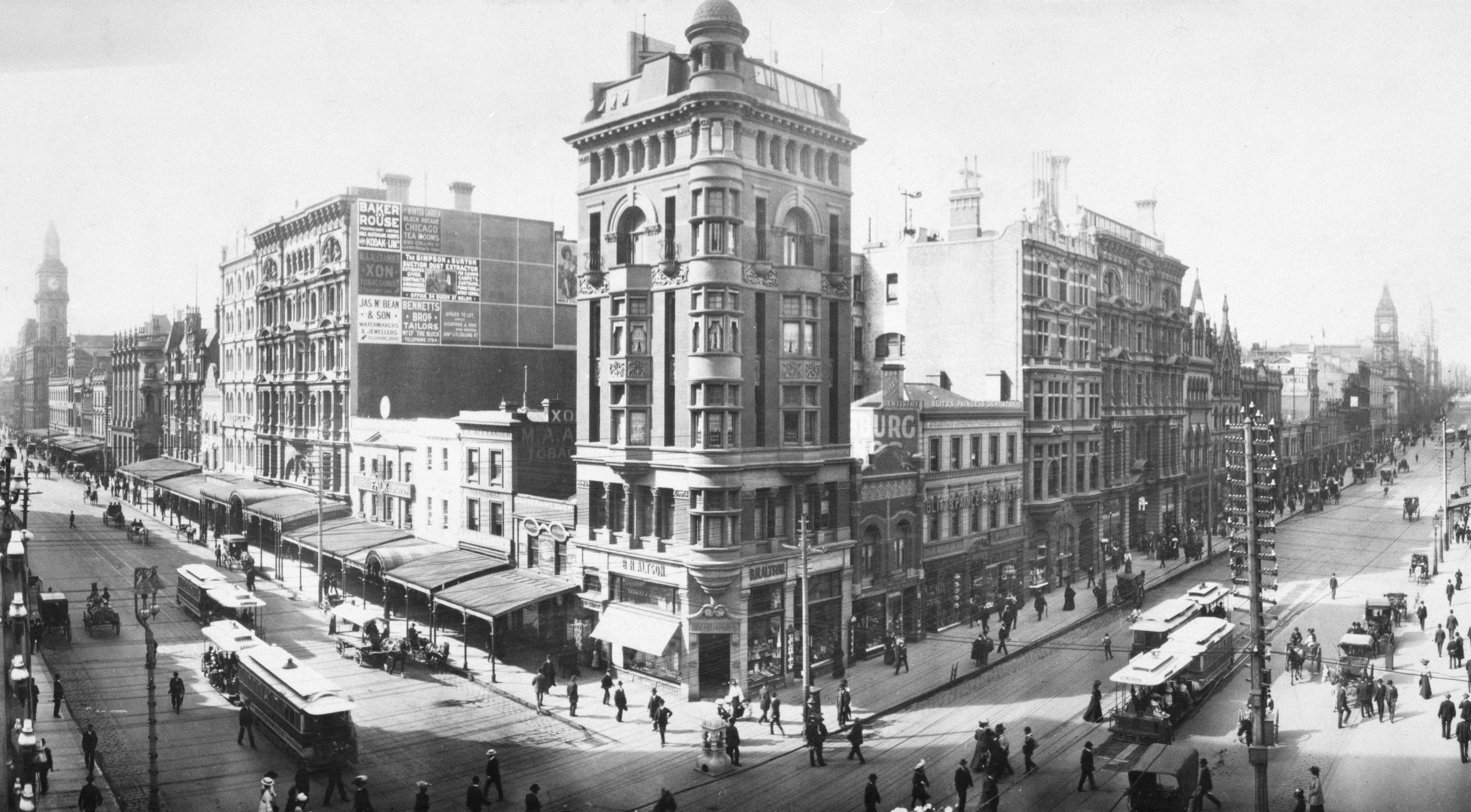
Altson's Corner in c1905

Tobacconist Henry Altson, an active member of Melbourne's Jewish community, occupied the old shop from about 1887, and the site became known as Altson's Corner. In 1903 he commissioned architect Nahum Barnet, another member of the Jewish community, to design a new premises, with a basement, ground floor shops, a mezzanine, five floors of ‘flats’ to rent above, topped by a mansard roofed studio suitable for artists or photographers. Barnet was a respected and prolific architect of the time, designing a range of commercial, residential and religious works from the 1880s into the 1910s, with many examples in the CBD. Constructed in record time by master builders Clements Langford Pty Ltd, the whole of the brick carcass was completed within a month in 1903. It was formally renamed Brunton Chambers, with the entrance and address to the upper floors now 82 Elizabeth Street. In 1912 Altson was able to purchase the land, and in 1914 also the property next door on Collins Street, and the building was then extended in matching style by one bay.

The Lyceum Club, for women who had a University degree, and the first women-only club to form in Melbourne, began here in 1912, until moving to larger premises in 1918.

Henry Altson died in 1945, and in 1956, the building was sold, and the business closed, with a redevelopment proposed. Instead, it was substantially altered in the 1950s, with the removal of the corner oriel and cupola, the top cornice and the balconettes, and the painting of the brickwork. In the 1970s, the upper floors were sealed off, leaving only the basement, ground and mezzanine floors in use as retail spaces.

In 1999, the building was purchased by Trevor Cohen, a descendent of Michael Cashmore, who engaged architect Kenneth Edelstein to restore the building, with the help of conservation architect Nigel Lewis, and convert the upper floors to apartments. The oriel bay windows, cupola, cornice, balconettes and Art Nouveau decoration were reconstructed in lightweight pre-cast materials matching the original in appearance. The single rooftop mansard floor artist's studio was replaced with two mansard floors. The program included retail space at basement and ground level, one or two bedroom apartments on levels 1 to 5, and two apartments spread over the mansard floors. The building was officially renamed The Cashmore.

== Description ==
The building is a seven storey office block, with retail at ground level, and basement, a mezzanine, and two rooftop mansard floors. It occupies a landmark corner position, emphasised by an almost circular projecting oriel window on the corner, topped by a cupola. The street sides feature bay windows set within tall arched elements, separated by tall narrow windows, giving the building a vertical emphasis. The attic level and first floor feature green-glazed columnettes, and the fourth floor features half-domed balconettes with cast-iron railings, with Art Nouveau decoration below. Column capitals and the tops of piers also feature Art Nouveau detailing. There is a prominent projecting cornice at the fifth floor, with a double level mansard roof above. Flat areas of wall are in red brick, while all other details are in painted cement render.
