= Jessie Isabel Henderson =

Australian social welfare worker (1866–1951)

- Born: Jessie Isabel Dodwell; 2 October 1866; Hobart, Tasmania, Australia
- Died: 11 January 1951 (aged 84); Hawthorn, Melbourne, Victoria, Australia
- Burial place: Boroondara Cemetery, Melbourne, Victoria, Australia
- Occupation: social welfare worker
- Organization(s): Hawthorn Ladies' Benevolent Society, Melbourne District Nursing Society, Housewives' Association of Victoria, National Council of Women of Victoria, Unemployed Girls' Relief Movement and Australian Comforts Fund
- Spouse: George Gabriel Henderson (m. 1891, died 1939)
- Children: 6

Jessie Isabel Henderson CBE (née Dodwell, 2 October 1866 – 11 January 1951) was an Australian social welfare worker. She was involved in organisations including the Hawthorn Ladies' Benevolent Society, Melbourne District Nursing Society, Housewives' Association of Victoria, National Council of Women of Victoria, Unemployed Girls' Relief Movement and Australian Comforts Fund.

== Biography ==
Henderson was born in 1866 in Hobart, Tasmania, Australia, and was the fourth daughter of shipping merchant Charles Dodwell and his wife Martha Dodwell. She was educated at a girls' academy in Hobart.

Henderson married George Gabriel Henderson on 24 February 1891 at St. Columb's Church in Hawthorn, Melbourne. They had six children. After her marriage she joined the Hawthorn Ladies' Benevolent Society.

In 1912, Henderson also joined the committee of the Melbourne District Nursing Society. In 1915 she was a founding member of the Housewives' Association of Victoria.

During World War I, Henderson was involved in relief work and campaigned in the pro-conscription cause. Two of her sons died during the conflict at Gallipoli. After the war, she chaired meetings to educate women about the League of Nations.

Henderson was a member of the National Council of Women of Victoria, becoming president in 1921 for a year long term. Her presidential address advocated for women receiving equal pay for equal work.

In 1927, Henderson was offered to be appointed as one of Victoria's first female justices of the peace, but was unable to accept the role due to her responsibilities to the numerous organisations that she was involved with.

During the 1930s depression, Henderson worked closely with Muriel Heagney. After a successful "Girls Week" of fundraising for unemployed girls, Henderson and Heagney established the Unemployed Girls' Relief Movement. The Movement founded sewing centres and a jam factory to provide employment.

During World War II, Henderson chaired a branch of the Australian Comforts Fund.

Henderson was appointed CBE in 1937. She died in 1951 in Hawthorn, Melbourne and was buried in Boroondara Cemetery.

== Legacy ==
Henderson was inducted into the Victorian Honour Roll of Women in 2001.
