= Margaret Gardiner Cuthbertson =

Factory inspector (1864–1944)

- Born: 6 September 1864; Bacchus Marsh, Victoria
- Died: 17 November 1944 (aged 80); Melbourne, Australia
- Resting place: Burwood Cemetery
- Occupation(s): Factory inspector, social reformer, and activist.
- Organization(s): Victorian Women's Public Service Association; National Council of Women of Victoria
- Known for: Being the first Female Factory Inspector in Australia.

Margaret Gardiner Cuthbertson (6 September 1864 - 17 November 1944) was an Australian factory inspector, social reformer, and activist. She was the first woman in Australia to hold the post of Female Factory Inspector, and the first President of the Victorian Women's Public Service Association.

== Early life ==
Margaret Gardiner Cuthbertson was born on 6 September 1864 at Bacchus Marsh, Victoria. Her parents were James Cuthbertson, a contractor from the north of England, and Jessie (née Watson), who had come to Australia from Edinburgh aged seven. Margaret was the youngest of seven children. Her sister Ada was one of the first women to work as a librarian in Australia.

== Career ==
Aged 16, Cuthbertson moved to Melbourne, where she worked in factories for eight years. In 1888, she began work as a telephone operator in the Postmaster General's Department.

Following the passing of the Factory and Shops Act in 1885, Victoria was the first state to appoint a Female Factory Inspector. Cuthbertson was the inaugural appointment to the post in 1894, chosen from 100 applicants. In 1900, she was promoted to Senior Inspector, remaining in role until 1920. She proved herself a good ally to women factory workers and apprentices, highlighting mistreatment and unfair practices in the industries she reported on, and advocating for fair wages and improved working conditions. In 1912, she was sent to the United Kingdom in an effort to find suitable female migrants for work in Victorian industry.

When the Victorian Women's Public Service Association was formed in 1901, Cuthbertson became its first President. She represented it on the National Council of Women of Victoria (est. 1902). She sat for many years on the council's executive committee, working on subcommittees for improving prison conditions for women, and to establish the Talbot Epileptic Colony. She was convenor of the Women's Centenary Council, established by the National Council of Women to research the contribution of Victoria's pioneer women. The resulting research was published as Records of the Pioneer Women of Victoria 1835-1860, including information on over 1,300 women.

Cuthbertson also supported the Free Kindergarten Union, founded in 1908. With Vida Goldstein, she worked to help unemployed women during the First World War.

Retiring as senior Female Factory Inspector in 1920, Cuthbertson continued her work for social welfare. She became a member of the council of the College of Domestic Economy (now the Emily McPherson College of Domestic Economy), served on the board of the Queen Victoria Hospital, and acted as treasurer of the Yooralla Hospital School for Crippled Children.

== Death ==
Margaret Gardiner Cuthbertson died on 17 November 1944 in Melbourne, and was buried in Burwood Cemetery.

An obituary in The Age described her as having done "valuable work in safeguarding the rights and well-being of woman and girl workers in the days when Victoria was becoming known as the leading industrial State in Australia".
