= Agnes G. Murphy =

Writer, journalist

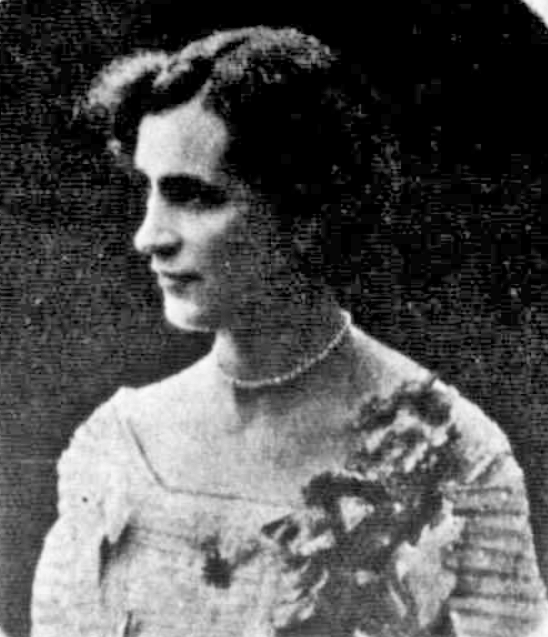
- Born: Agnes Gillian Murphy; 1865; Ireland
- Died: 15 March 1931; London

Agnes G. Murphy (1865 – 15 March 1931), was an Irish journalist and writer who wrote the first biography of Dame Nellie Melba.

== Life ==
Born in Tullamore, King's County, Ireland in 1865, Agnes Murphy spent much of her life travelling and writing. She initially visited Australia in 1885 to see her sister Lily who lived there and remained there when her financial situation was seriously curtailed. She had at least one brother. She worked as a journalist in Melbourne, and about nine years later, in London. Her first novel One Woman's Wisdom was recalled in Melbourne due to a libel suit though it sold very well in The United Kingdom. She worked for the Melbourne Punch and the Melbourne Herald beginning as their social editor and the only woman on the Punch reporting team. Before she left Murphy was identified as the editor of Punch. While in Melbourne, in 1890 Murphy was a founder of Austral Salon which was created to support the intellectual advancement of the women of Australia.

In 1891 Murphy, with the Austral Salon, raised funds to allow Matilda Aston to go to University.

She returned to Europe to work in London, leaving Melbourne by ship on 30 March 1895. On arrival she sold her novel immediately and began working for a wide variety of British newspapers as well including The Pall Mall Gazette. She continued to write her 'Ladies Letter' for Punch attributing them to Rhoda. She started an Austral Salon in London and was a popular hostess for singers and artists from Australia. Murphy spent two years working as Dame Nellie Melba's secretary and was trusted to write her biography which included several chapters written by Dame Melba directly. While living in London, Ada Crossley lived with Murphy in Swiss Cottage. Before leaving on a what ended up being a two-year trip, Murphy was elected to the council of the Society of Women Journalists. She was hired to be the advance Public relations for Crossley and as her health was also poor at the time she used the opportunity to recover. She continued to travel, with her lifelong companion Aimee Moore, returning to Australia on multiple occasions. They visited France, Spain, Italy, New York and San Francisco amongst others. It was there she was the first woman ever elected to membership of Geographical Society of California in 1904. She was an advocate for women and for Irish independence. Murphy gave talks and lectures around the world and worked for the New Zealand government on a tour of the US and Canada. She continued to work as an advance agent for musical performers.

Murphy died in London in 1931. She was buried in Hampstead Cemetery. After her death the Melbourne papers published a poem Murphy had written to her lifelong partner Aimee Moore.

In a dream I heard a message
From the Herald of the night,
And he said, "Your task is over,
Here no longer need you hover,
For your love no more will need you,
She has conquered in the fight."

Then I breathed her name in sadness,
And in silence sped away.
Through the realms of darkest distance,
Till at last with fond insistence
My cold lips gave forth the pleading, -
"With my darling let me stay."

"In that sphere," he answered gently,
"She will never need you more.
Come with me beyond the border,
There by loving service, order
That when she shall quit life's harbour,
There'll be light across the way."

"At the gate of God's high altar,
You will, wait and watch and pray,
Joy for her you loved so purely,
Till a tender Christ will surely
Hear your pleading for the loved one
You have left so far away.

"You will say, 'I loved her dearly,
More than life or death could prove.'
And our gracious Lord in pity,
Pointing to the Heavenly City,
Will cry."Peace! You both may enter,
Know you not that God is Love?"

== Bibliography ==
- One Woman's Wisdom, 1895
- Melba : A Biography, 1909
