= Alexander Colquhoun (artist) =

Scottish-born Federation era Victorian painter, illustrator and critic

Alexander Colquhoun (15 February 1862 – 14 February 1941) was a Scottish-born Australian painter, illustrator and art critic.

== Early life and training ==
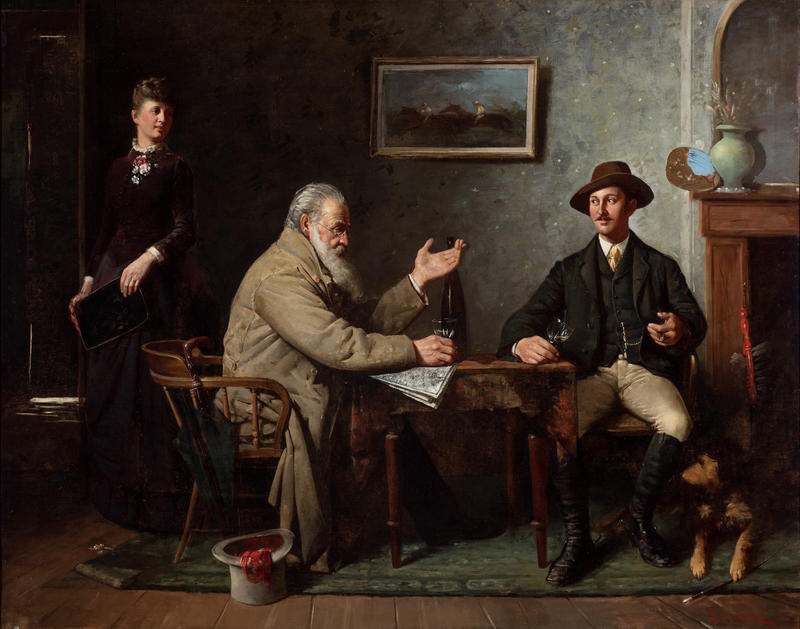
Alexander Colquhoun (1887) Divided Attention, Oil on canvas

Colquhoun was born the youngest child of Margaret (née Wright) and Archibald Colquhoun, merchant on 15 February 1862 and lived at 166 Hospital Street, Glasgow. Migrating to Australia on the Loch Vennacher when he was fourteen, the family arrived in Melbourne in 1876. The eldest daughter Margaret died soon after their arrival in Moonee Ponds, Melbourne, where they settled and where the oldest son Archibald, who had trained in Glasgow, practiced at the Alfred Hospital before moving to Bendigo Hospital where in 1880 he was appointed resident surgeon, but died 9 November 1892 shortly after his resignation earlier that year.

Alexander may have had preliminary art training in Glasgow from his father, but the first classes he attended in Australia were at the National Gallery of Victoria Art School in its School of Design (drawing) 1877-79 under Thomas Clark. He lived with his brother to study 1880-81 at the Bendigo School of Mines and Industries under Hugh Fegan. where he won prizes in 1880 for "Drawing from the round" and "Freehand Drawing", receiving his qualification "to teach drawing" from the Department of Education in 1881 with the certificate of competency, the highest certificate on this subject issued by the Department.

He returned to the National Gallery school 1882-87 to its School of Art under George Folingsby. A history painting he completed at the end of his course, Divided Attention, which had won 'first general prize' in an exhibition of student work at the National Gallery School, was praised in an extended analysis filling a column the Bendigo Advertiser when it was exhibited at the Sandhurst (Bendigo) Fine Art Gallery, where it is now in the collection.

His lifelong friendship with John Longstaff was formed at the Gallery School and at the Buonarotti Club. He was a friend of Max Meldrum and influenced by his tonalism and colour theories. His English wife Beatrix Colquhoun (nee Hoile), whom he married.on 15 September 1892 was also an impressionist painter and a former National Gallery school student and had studied art in Paris. They exhibited together, and were neighbours of Longstaff and Frederick McCubbin in Brighton.

== Exhibiting artist ==
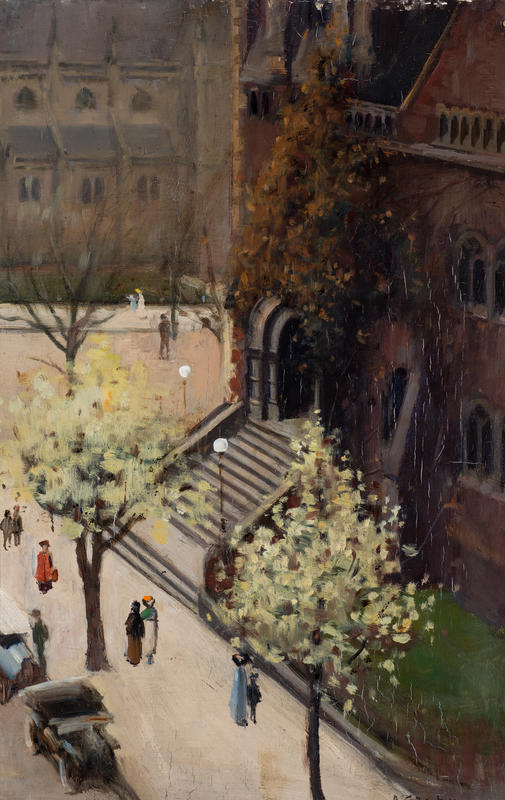
Alexander Colquhoun (1920-1926) Independent Church, Collins Street, Oil on wood, 47.5 x 31.4 cm, Castlemaine Art Museum, Gift of J.T. Tweddle, 1926

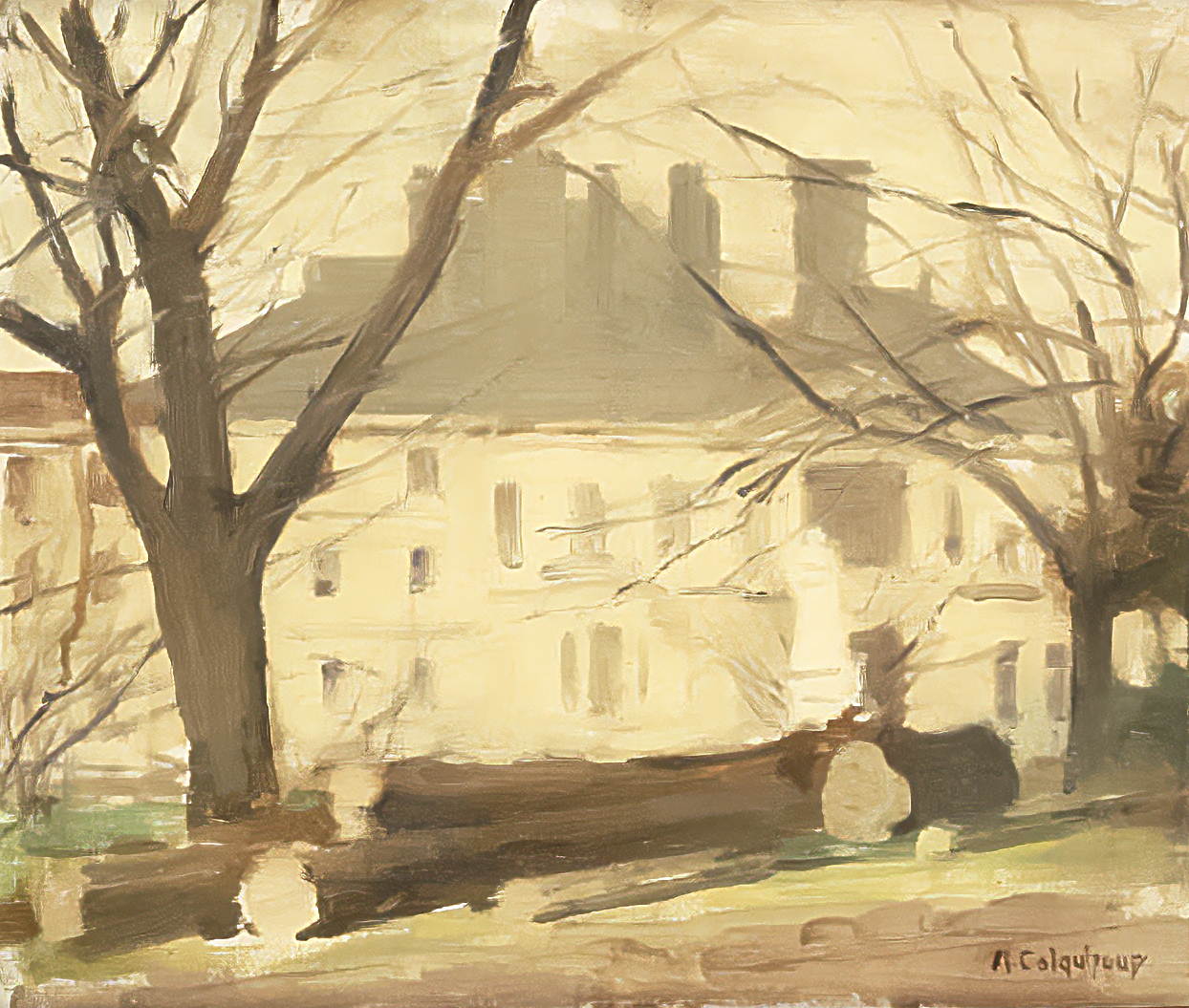
Alexander Colquhoun (c.1930) Building on corner of old Spring and Latrobe Streets, Melbourne

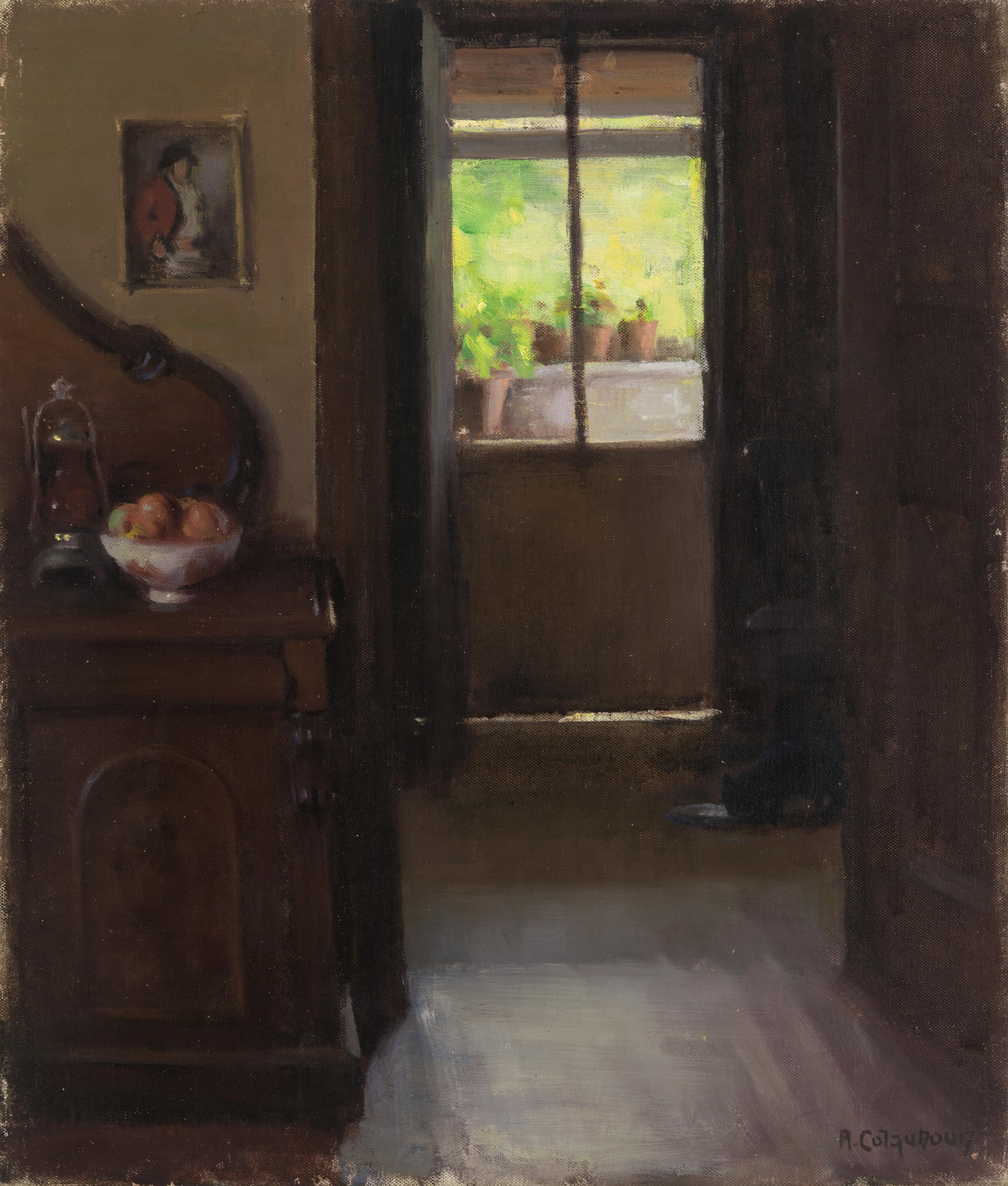
Interior (c. 1938) Alexander Colquhoun oil on canvas on composition board 45.4 × 38.5 cm

Colquhoun exhibited in the Australian Artists' Association in 1887, and next year he began showing landscape, interiors and portraits at the Victorian Artists' Society. His painting of an interior was amongst works loaned by Bertha Merfield from her collection to the inaugural exhibition of the Castlemaine Art Gallery in 1913.

His solo exhibitions were shown in galleries and in his studio, and, he regularly joined in those of the Victorian Artists' Society; of the Yarra Sculptors' Society in 1901; the Twenty Melbourne Painters; and the Australian Art Association in 1916-32. In the 1920s, Colquhoun ket a studio in the Austral Building, 115-119 Collins Street, Melbourne, from which he painted a view of the Independent and Scots Churches.

== Style and reception ==
A reviewer in The Bulletin in 1932 notes his conservative impressionist style;

Unassuming sincerity marks the work of Alexander Colquhoun, whose paintings are on show at the Grosvenor Gallery, Melbourne. Colquhoun has a keen eye for the pictorial aspects of his city and a charming way of relating what his eye has seen. He is a veteran painter, trained in the orthodox schools, who has abandoned the gallery picture ambition and returned to the simple impression, a far more difficult job.

McCulloch notes that;

“His paintings were impressionistic, but tempered by Folingsby's Munich style [ . . . ] His original sombre palette lightened with more impressionistic flavour and a greater sense of light and shade as his subjects changed from interiors to landscapes.”

== Teaching ==
Colquhoun conducted a private art school, and around 1910 taught drawing at the Working Men's College and was art teacher at Toorak Teachers College until 1930.

== Writing ==
While a member of the Buonarotti Club Colquhoun, then twenty-three, penned satyrical verse urging the Victorian National Gallery to rehang French painter Jules Lefebvre's 1875 nude Chloé, loaned to it by its purchaser Dr Thomas Fitzgerald, during a scandal about it being displayed on a Sunday.

He regularly wrote for and illustrated magazines including the V.A.S. and Art in Australia and as one of a number of Australian art critics for news periodicals who proliferated in the early 20th century, wrote for the Melbourne Herald for eight years 1914-22, and the Philadelphian Christian Science Monitor for a year during 1916-17. His critical writing and feature articles including contemporary biographies of Melbourne artists appeared regularly in the Age from 1926 until his death.

Though he avoided entering the controversy around the Meldrum tonalists, he contributed significantly with research into the early history of Australian art, and the Heidelberg School in early monographs on McCubbin (1919), Walter Withers and W. B. McInnes (1920), and was editor of the Year Book of Victorian Art (1922–23).

== Memberships ==
While a student at the National Gallery School Colquhoun joined the bohemian Buonarotti Club. He was secretary of the Victorian Artists' Society, 1904–14, a foundation member of the Australian Art Association and in 1936 was appointed a trustee of the National Gallery of Victoria. In 1937 he joined and exhibited with Robert Menzies' Australian Academy of Art.

He died in East Malvern on 14 February 1941, and was cremated, survived by his wife and three of their four children including Archibald, a painter who married the artist Amalie Sara Colquhoun

The Bulletin published a brief obituary:

"Artist Alexander Colquhoun, who passed over at 75 in Melbourne last week, was born and educated in Glasgow, and came out to Australia as a young man when the Eaglemont school was flourishing and Conder, McCubbin, Streeton and Tom Roberts were starting. In the early days of that movement he painted and exhibited a lot. Later he became art critic of The Age, a Gallery trustee and a foundation member of the Australian Academy. Colquhoun lost a son in the last war; another is a well-known Melbourne painter."

== Exhibitions ==
- 1887: Student show at the National Gallery of Victoria: first general prize for Divided Attention
- 1912, July: The Victorian Artists' Society's Seventeenth Annual Exhibition: The Old Home, Warrandyte
- 1913, 18 August: Joint show by the Colquhoun couple, Besant Hall, Centreway Arcade Melbourne

== Collections ==
- National Gallery of Victoria
- Castlemaine Art Museum
- Bendigo Art Gallery
- Art Gallery of South Australia

== Gallery ==
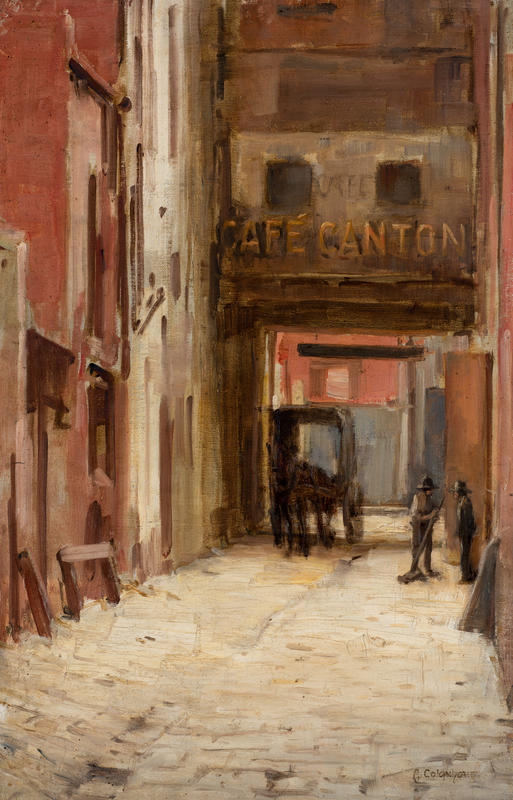
Alexander Colquhoun (c.1922) Cafe Canton, Oil on canvas, 53.5 x 35.5 c, Castlemaine Art Museum, J.R. Hartley Bequest, 1961

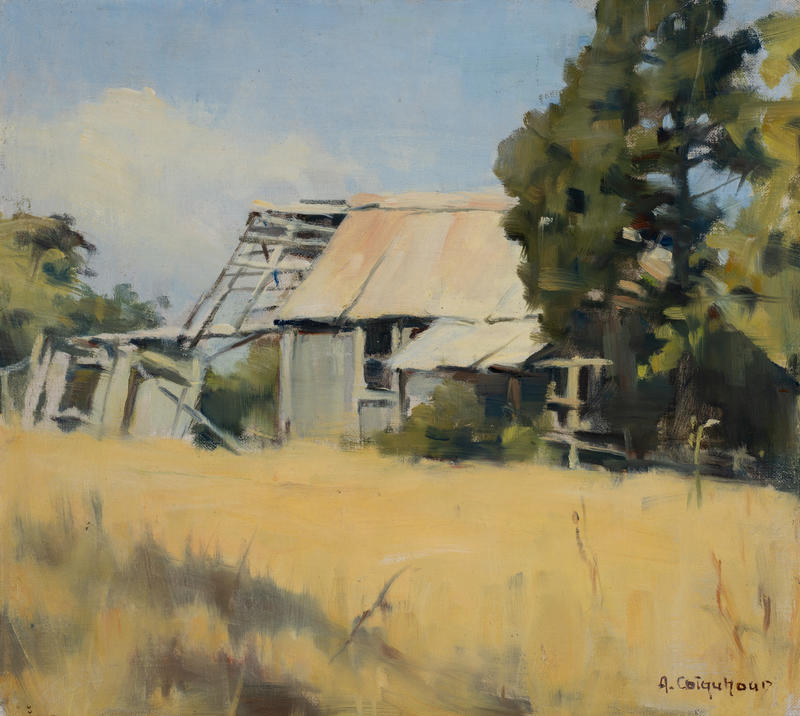
Alexander Colquhoun (1930s) Derelict, Oil on canvas mounted on board, 35.5 x 40.5 cm, Castlemaine Art Museum. Purchased 1940

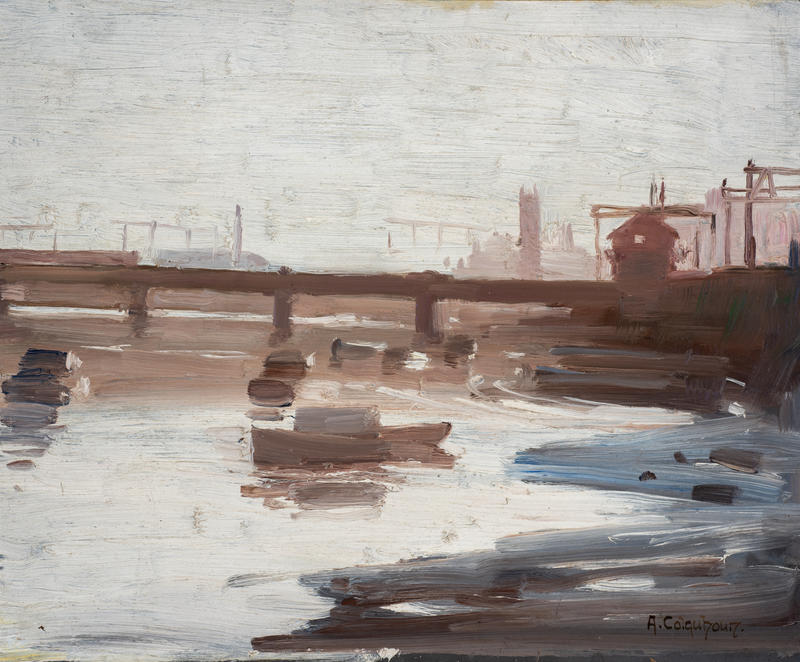
Alexander Colquhoun, (c.1920s) The River Oil on cardboard,25.5 x 31.0 cm Castlemaine Art Museum, purchased 1929

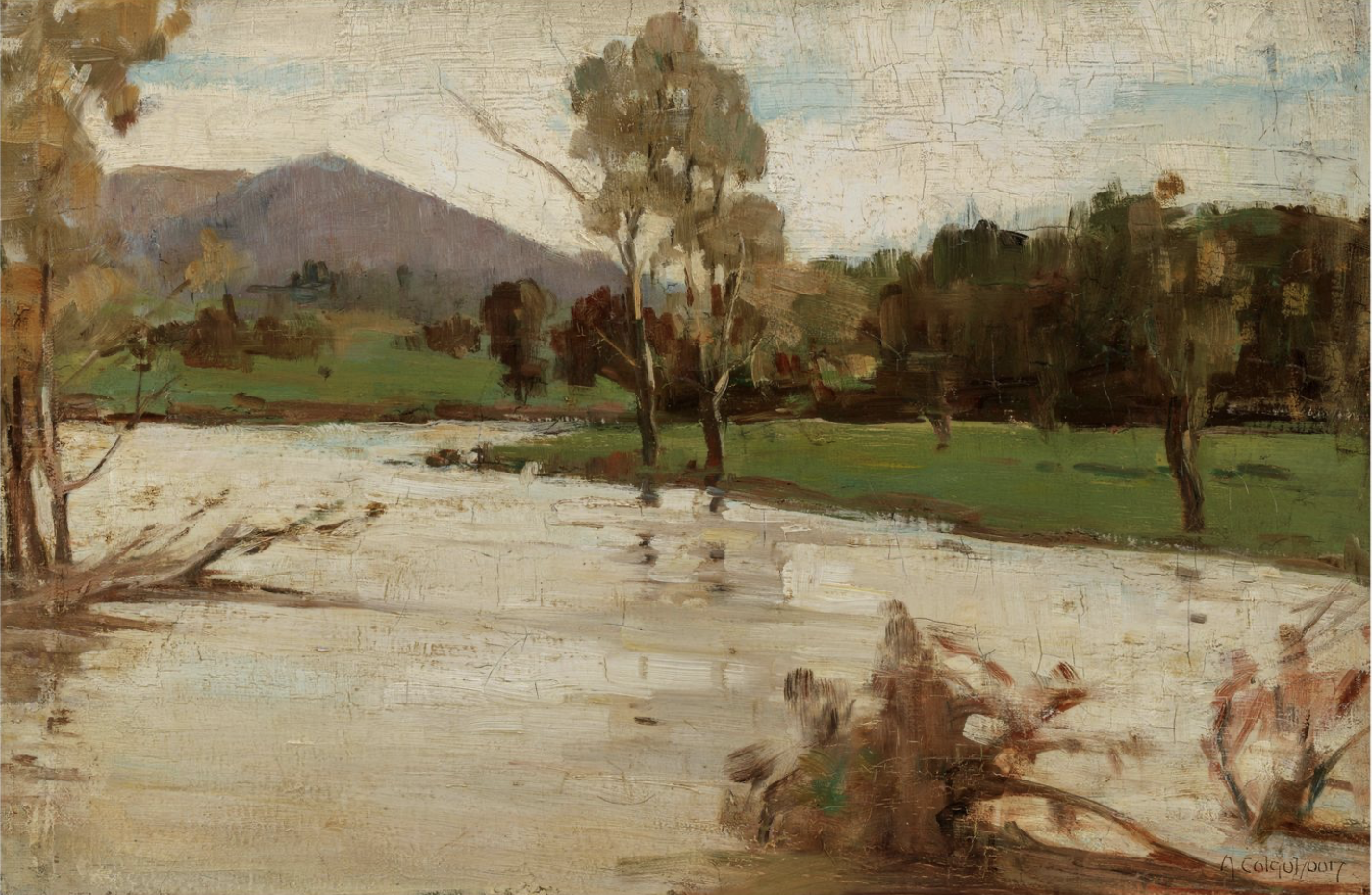
Alexander Colquhoun, Australia, 1862 1941, The Murray in flood, c.1920, Victoria, oil on canvas, 34.5 X 52.2 cm; Elizabeth and Tom Hunter Bequest 2009, Art Gallery of South Australia, Adelaide.
