= National Council of Women of Victoria =

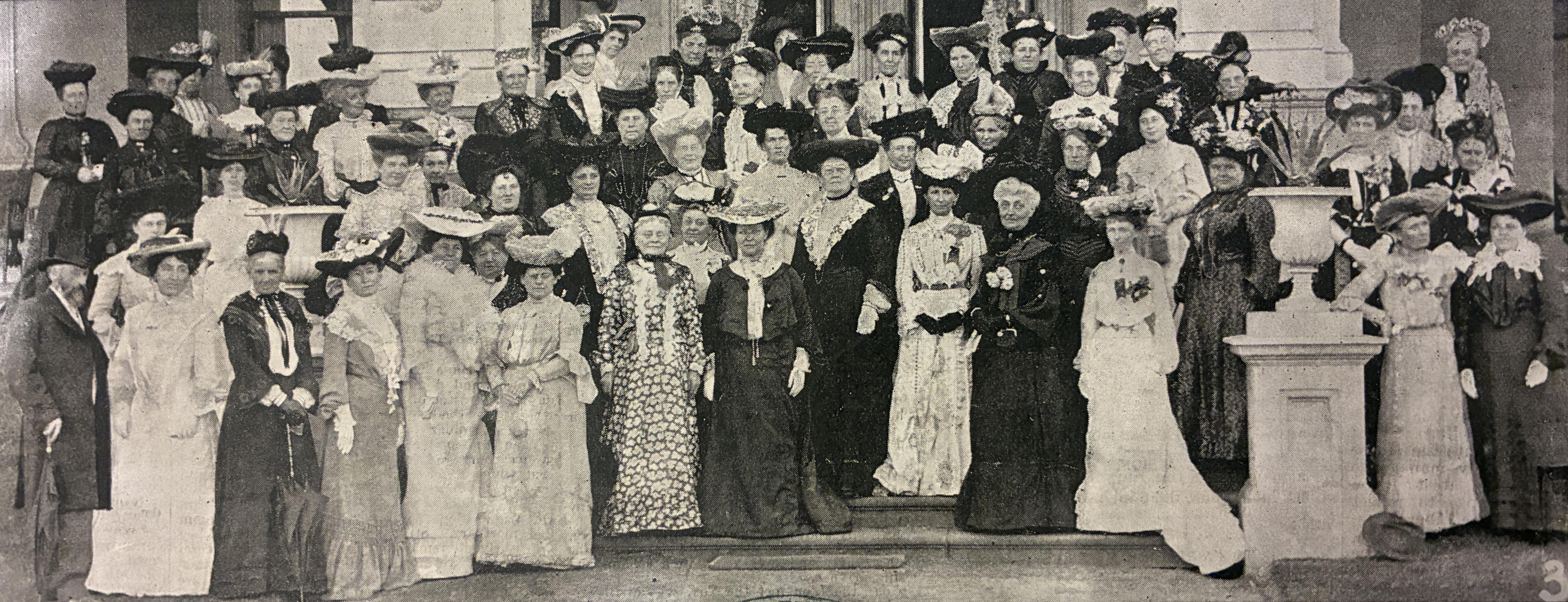
- Established: 1902; 124 years ago
- Location: Victoria, Australia
- Founding presidents: Janet Clarke
- Parent organisation: National Council of Women of Australia; International Council of Women
- Website: www.ncwvic.org.au

The National Council of Women of Victoria (NCWVIC) was founded in Victoria, Australia, in 1902 with Janet Clarke as the founding president. The organisation is a branch of the National Council of Women of Australia, and the International Council of Women. It is an umbrella group for a number of associated member organisations and aims to progress women's issues and women's rights in the state of Victoria.

== Background ==
The International Council of Women (ICW) was the idea of American women's rights activists Susan B Anthony, and May Wright Sewell formed at a women's suffrage conference that Anthony organised in 1888 in Washington DC on the fortieth anniversary of the 1848 Seneca Falls Convention. The 'council idea', as they referred to it, would be an international umbrella organisation which would go beyond just political rights of women, with a focus on broader women's interests. The council would bring together women's organisations on national and international levels to connect and learn from each other to promote peace and general wellbeing.

Sewell stated there were five key objectives:

- Providing a way for women and organisations in different forms of public work to meet
- fostering understanding between the individuals and groups to highlight where their different areas converged
- connecting the spiritual imperatives underpinnings of their work
- Exercising the spiritual influence to encourage progress through public opinion
- Move away from territorial identities from shaping internationalism and nationalism, and instead focussing on fostering social, humanitarian, moral, and political ideals

She further stated that the council would be a forum "where all the great questions that concern humanity shall be discussed from the woman's point of view" and that it would all the shedding of class and ethic boundaries through fostering human harmony and spiritual one-ness.

The first National Council of Women formed in Australia started in New South Wales (NSW) on 26 June 1896, when Margaret Windeyer called together NSW women's groups to form a council. Windeyer had represented NSW women on the council of the World's Congress of Representative Women in Chicago in 1893, which Sewell was instrumental in organising. It was the largest gathering of women from many different countries to have happened at that time. Speeches were given by 300 women from 27 countries, and they discussed the formation and structure of the ICW.

== Formation ==
On 19 March 1902, Janet Clarke called the inaugural meeting of representatives of 35 voluntary society at the Austral Salon. Clarke presided over the meeting. Emily Dobson, from Tasmania, was primary speaker as she had recently attended the ICW's 1899 Quinquennial Conference in London as part of the Australian delegation. She outlined objectives that had been drawn from those of the ICW:

1. To establish a bond of union between the various affiliated societies.
2. To advance the interests of women and children and of humanity in general.
3. To confer on questions relating to the welfare of the family, the state and commonwealth.

Margaret McLean, who was the president of the Women's Christian Temperance Union of Victoria (WCTU), put forward the resolution that the National Council of Women of Victoria be formed.

They elected office bearers and committee members which included Clarke as president, Louisa Bevan and Annie Lowe as vice presidents, and committee members Annie Watson Lister, Marie Kirk, and Catherine Hay Thomson.

=== Inaugural member organisations ===
At the inaugural meeting there were 35 member organisations represented including:

Medical and social services	Political/Lobby groups	Clubs
Association of Domestic Economy	Hawthorn Progressive League	Austral Salon
Australian Church Social Improvement Society	Jewish Women's Guild	Australasian Women's Association
Collingwood Creche	Kew Progressive League	Bendigo Women's Literary Society
Convalescent Home for Women	Prahran Women's Progressive League	Collingwood Girls' Club
Gentlewomen's Aid Society	United Council for Women Suffrage	Collins Street Independent Church Ladies' Reading Society
Maternity Patients' Convalescent home	Victorian Alliance	Daughters of the Court
Melbourne District Nursing Society	Victorian Lady Teachers' Association	Hawthorn Ladies' Reading Society
Methodist Neglected Children's Aid Society	Victorian Women's Political League	Princess Ida Club
Queen Victoria Hospital	Victorian Women's Post and Telegraph Association	Writers' Club
Victorian Infant Asylum and Foundling Hospital	Victorian Women's Public Service Association	
Women's Health Society	Women's Christian Temperance Union	
Women's Hospital	Women's Progressive League	
	Young Women's Christian Association	

== Associated people ==
- Ivy Brookes (1883–1970) – Australian community worker and activist who joined in 1912, and became vice president and then president in the 1930s and 1940s. She went on to be the president of the Australian branch from 1948 until 1952. She was also a vice president of the international branch.
- Margaret Gardiner Cuthbertson (1864-1944) – Australian factory inspector, who as the first president of the Victorian Women's Public Service Association, represented them on the council.
- Helen Elizabeth Gillan (1873–1955) – Voluntary worker and social reformer, published a history of the NCWVIC in 1945.
- Eleanor Glencross (1876–1950) – Australian feminist who was on the executive committee for ten years from 1918 until 1928, as well as being president from 1927 until 1928.
- Jessie Isabel Henderson (1866–1951) – Australian social welfare worker who was on the committee of the NCWVIC for more than 20 years. She was also president from 1921 until 1923.
- Kitty McEwan (1894-1969) –Australian sports journalist, golfer and war-worker, was a media officer and executive member of the council from about 1956 until 1969.
- May Moss (1869–1948) – Australian suffragist and women's rights campaigner, She was a member of the NWCVIC from 1904.
- Audrey Reader (1903–1989) – Liberal party organiser and community worker, was made an honorary member in 1974.
- Lillias Margaret Skene (1867–1957) – Australian activist who represented the Guild of Play on the council up until the 1920s.
