= Empire Building (Melbourne) =

Heritage-listed building in Melbourne, Australia

Coordinates: 37°49′4″S 144°57′56″E

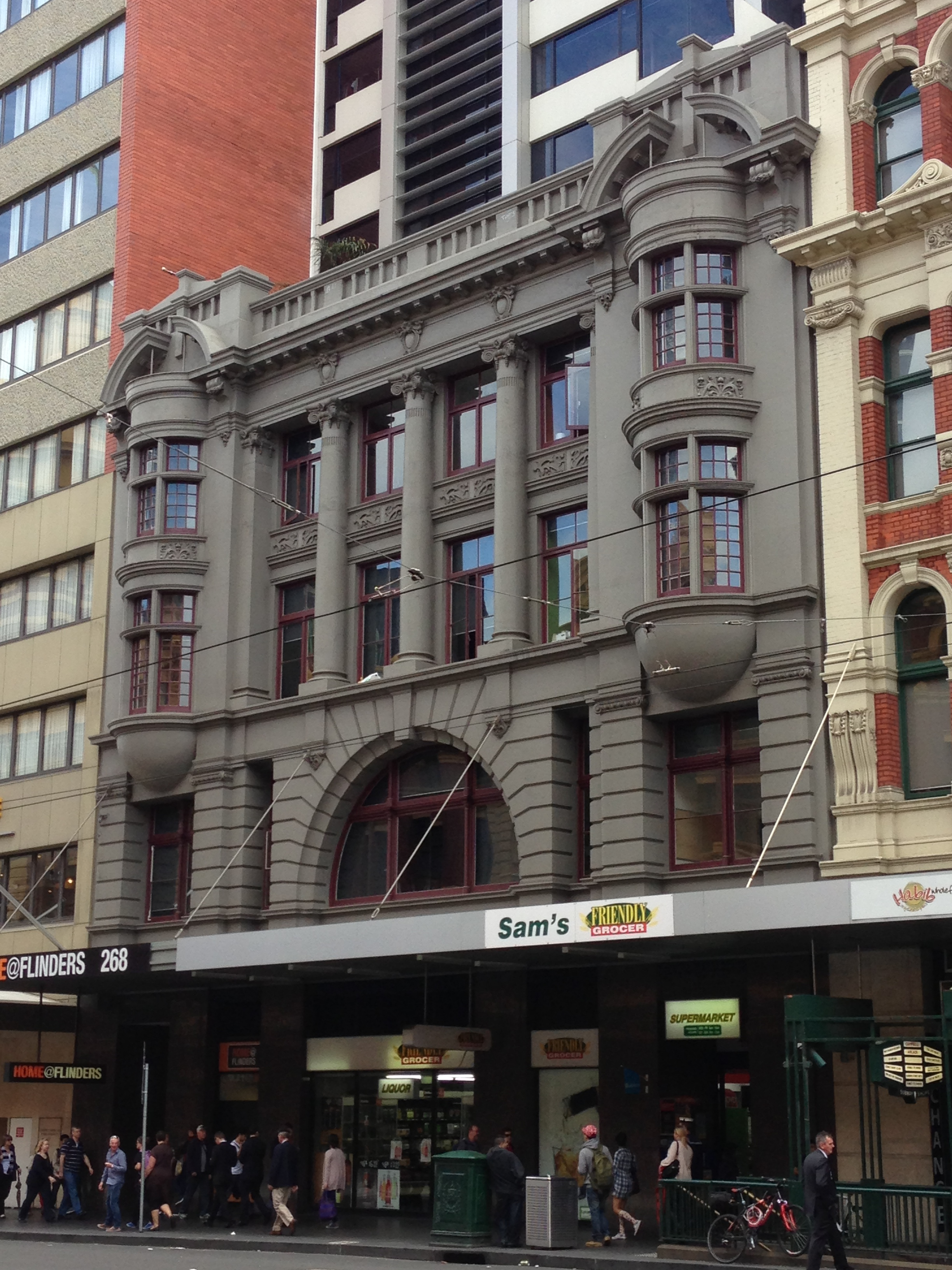
- Interactive map of the Empire Building area

General information
- Architectural style: Federation free classical
- Location: 290 Flinders Street, Melbourne, Australia
- Completed: 1906, 2006 (redeveloped)

Design and construction
- Architects: Nahum Barnet (original); Clarke Hopkins Clarke (redevelopment)

The Empire Building was home to commercial, retail arcade with offices and showrooms over, in the city of Melbourne, Australia. It stands beside the Mutual Store building on the corner of Flinders and Degraves Streets, opposite Flinders Street station. The Empire Building and Mutual Store were redeveloped into a residential complex, completed in 2006.

== History ==
Originally known as the Empire Arcade, the building was designed by Nahum Barnet and constructed in 1906. It housed a variety of different uses, with a dead-end retail arcade at ground level and "rooms" above, accommodating over the years the usual array of specialist uses found in city buildings such as a cafe on the first floor, a ladies training college, a dressmaker, a tailor, a poultry specialist, and a meeting room for hire. The Empire Arcade was nearly gutted by a spectacular fire in 1923, resulting in losses exceeding at £70,000 but it was quickly rebuilt in the following years. In 1955 it was purchased by the adjacent Mutual Store, and underwent a range of modifications. These included absorbing the arcade space, creation of entries through the party wall, the reconfiguration of entries and internal circulation, and the addition of a modern canopy. In 1965, the store closed and the two buildings became the city home of the College of Advanced Education for 40 years. The Mutual Store and the Empire Building were redeveloped by the developer Baycrown and architects ClarkeHopkinsClarke, beginning in 2001. The redevelopment was finished in 2006. Designed by ClarkeHopkinsClarke Architects, a small front section of the Empire Building was retained, and a 14 storey tower added behind. Retail spaces still take up the entirety of the ground floor, albeit no longer in an arcade format. The rest of the project is given over to small to medium-sized apartments. Because of the poor state of the building’s façade, the developer contracted a specialist firm to rebuild the mouldings, urns, and other features, and the original sandy yellow colour of the building was painted over in grey. This redevelopment required the balancing of heritage guidelines, commercial imperatives and the City of Melbourne Planning Scheme. Council required the retention of the street canopies to Flinders Street to provide continuous street shelter for pedestrians and to create an active edge to both Flinders and Degraves Street.

== Architecture ==
Barnet was a flexible architect who built in many different styles over his long career, or indeed at any given time. Built in the Edwardian Period, the Empire Building is a good example of Federation architecture in a broadly Federation Free Classical style, with other influences. Some of the classical elements could be described as Edwardian Baroque, such as the exaggerated voussoir around the central arched window, which continue as rustication to the whole first floor, and the pair of arched broken pediments on the parapet, while the Ionic colonnade shows the then emerging influence of the Neo-Classical. The shape of the main window suggests a Romanesque influence to Barnet's overall eclectic but delightful design.
