= List of Old Collegians of PLC Melbourne =

This is a List of Old Collegians of PLC Melbourne – known as "PLC Old Collegians" – of the Presbyterian Church school, Presbyterian Ladies' College, Melbourne in Burwood, Victoria, Australia.

In 2001, The Sun-Herald named Presbyterian Ladies' College, Melbourne the best girls' school in Australia based on the number of its alumni mentioned in Who's Who in Australia.

== Academic ==
- Maureen Brunt – Emeritus Professor of Economics, Monash University
- Maud Martha Cameron – Headmistress of Firbank Girls' Grammar School (1911–54) and president of the Victorian Association of Headmistresses (1936–37)
- Dymphna Clark (née Lodewyckx) – Language scholar and wife of historian Manning Clark
- Nina Alison Crone OAM – Teacher; Former Headmistress of Melbourne Girls Grammar School; Historian; Linguist; Journalist
- Mary (Isabel) Flinn – Prominent school teacher and university lecturer
- Julia Teresa Flynn – Educationist; First female school inspector; Namesake of 'Julia Flynn Avenue' in Isaacs, Australian Capital Territory
- Nancy Jobson – Educator; Former headmistress of Southland Girls' High School (Invercargill, New Zealand), Queen Margaret College (Wellington, New Zealand), Fairholme Presbyterian Girls' College (Toowoomba, Queensland), and Pymble Ladies' College (Pymble, New South Wales)
- Dame Leonie Judith Kramer – Former Chancellor of the University of Sydney
- Elizabeth Inglis Lothian – Teacher of Classics; Councillor of the Classical Association of Victoria
- Isabel McBryde AO – Professor Emerita, Australian National University; School Fellow, School of Social Sciences, Faculty of Arts; Independent Researcher
- Joan Montgomery AM. OBE – Educator; former principal of Clyde School, Woodend and Presbyterian Ladies' College, Melbourne
- Helen Gwynneth Palmer – Educationist, Socialist and Writer
- Rosemary Teele – Rhodes Scholar
- Marjorie Jean Tipping MBE – Freelance Author, Art Historian, Consultant and Lecturer on Early Victorian and Tasmanian History and Oriental and Colonial Art History

== Business ==
- Fiona Balfour – Chief Information Officer of Telstra (2006–07), and Qantas (2001–06)
- Dur-e Najaf Dara OAM – Restaurateur; Owner and Operator of EQ Cafebar (Melbourne); Partner/Menu Design of Nudel Bar (Melbourne); Partner of the Tea Corporation; Recipient of the Centenary Medal 2003 (also attended Methodist Girls' School, Singapore)
- Jane Harvey – Director of Medibank Private; Director of IOOF Holdings
- Rosemary Jessamyn Howell – Proprietor, Strategic Action Pty Ltd (formerly Rosemary Howell Business Services); Director National Board of Directors, Quality in Law Inc.
- Patricia Kailis AM, OBE – Governing Director and Co-Founder of the M G Kailis Group of Companies

== Community ==
- Annie Cohen – Charity worker
- Gladys Maeva Cumpston – Community worker, prize winning gardener and Braille transcriber
- Henrietta Jessie Shaw Daley – Community worker; Founder of the ACT branch of the National Council of Women
- Dame Phyllis Frost – Welfare worker and philanthropist, known for her commitment to unpopular causes.
- Jessie McLaren – Australian missionary in Korea, book collector, teacher and translator
- Florence Mitchell - Girl Guide leader
- Lady Eliza Fraser Morrison – Charity worker; Chairman of the Victorian Red Cross home hospitals committee; Assistant commissioner of the Australian Red Cross Society in England; Appointed C.B.E. and Edward K.C.M.G
- Eleanor Harriett (Nell) Rivett – Missionary and principal of the Women's Christian College, Chennai, India
- Philadelphia Nina Robertson – Red Cross administrator
- Helen Macpherson Schutt – Philanthropist
- Lady Alice Maud Sewell – First woman to win the Wyselaskie scholarship in classical and comparative philology and logic; Founding member of the Lyceum Club, Melbourne; Awarded the Coronation medal.
- Hilda Stevenson DBE – philanthropist and community worker
- Jean Marion Tom AO – Community worker; Recipient Centenary Medal 2003, ANZAC of the Year Award RSL 1999
- Rita May Wilson – Community worker

== Entertainment, media and the arts ==
- Christine Dorothy Brunton – Actress
- Felicity Cockram – Executive Producer, Producer, Business and Script Consultant; former CEO Australian Film Institute

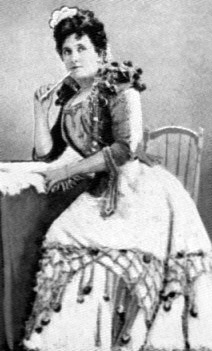
Dame Nellie Melba

- Enid Derham – Poet
- Lauris Margaret Elms – Opera Singer
- Louise Berta Mosson Hanson Dyer – Patron of the arts and music publisher
- Helen Mitchell – Soprano, who would be known as Dame Nellie Melba
- Helen Morse – Australian actress and costume designer
- Ida Rentoul Outhwaite – Artist
- Janet Gertrude (Nettie) Palmer – Writer and critic
- Ada May Plante – Artist
- Ethel Florence Lindesay Richardson – Author, published as Henry Handel Richardson
- Irene Frances Taylor – Journalist and feminist
- Violet Helen Evangeline Teague – Artist
- Tamsin West – Actress best known for her role as Linda in Round the Twist
- Grace Brown – Olympic Gold Medalist

== Medicine and science ==
- Lilian Helen Alexander – Pioneering medical practitioner
- Constance Ellis – First Victorian woman to become a doctor of medicine
- Ethel Godfrey – Victoria's first female dentist
- Ethel Gray – Nursing sister and army matron
- Robyn Guymer – Associate Professor, Department of Ophthalmology, University of Melbourne; Head, Macular Research Unit, Centre for Eye Research Australia; Consultant, Royal Victorian Eye and Ear Hospital
- Ida Gertrude Margaret Halley – Medical officer and Feminist; One of the first female medical students at the University of Melbourne
- Dr Margaret Hilda Harper – Pioneering paediatrician, daughter of former PLC principal Rev. Dr Andrew Harper
- Mary Jermyn Heseltine – One of the first Australian doctors to study exfoliative cytology; Established the first gynaecological cytology unit in Australia at King George V Hospital
- Kate Mackay – Physician and public servant
- Dame Annie Jean Macnamara – Medical scientist
- Winifred Barbara Meredith – Pioneering medical practitioner specialising in child and infant care
- Joan Janet Brown Refshauge – Pioneering medical practitioner and medical administrator
- Alice Ross-King – Civilian and Army nurse
- Anna "Nan" Schofield – One of the first Australian Army nurses to serve in the Middle East during World War II; Author
- Dr Eleanor Margrethe (Rita) Stang – Pioneering medical practitioner
- Elizabeth Kathleen Turner AO – Paediatrician who was a Medical Superintendent of the Children's Hospital Melbourne (1943-1946) and was the first doctor in Australia to administer penicillin.
- Rose Ethel Janet White-Haney – Botanist

== Politics, public service and the law ==
- Sally Capp – Lord Mayor of Melbourne
- Catherine Deakin – Sister of Alfred Deakin
- Joan Rose Dwyer OAM – Former Chairman Equal Opportunity Board (Vic); Member, Mental Health Review Tribunal (Vic)

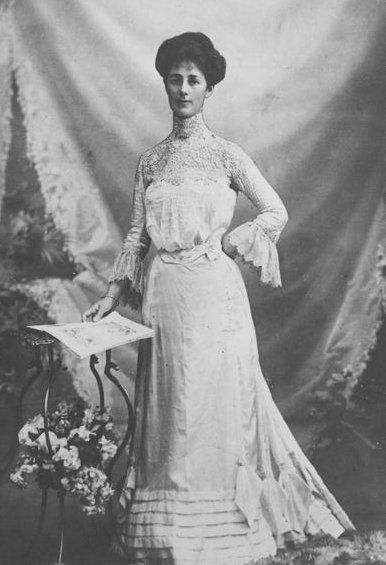
Vida Goldstein

- Elizabeth Moulton Eggleston – Academic lawyer and activist
- Vida Goldstein – Suffragette and first woman to stand for election to the Federal Parliament of Australia
- Flos Greig – First woman admitted to the Victorian Bar
- Rosemary Claire Hunter – Professor of Law at the University of Kent; formerly Professor of Law at Griffith University, Dean of the Faculty of Law, Director of the Socio-Legal Research Centre
- Fiona Krautil – Director of the Equal Opportunity for Women in the Workplace Agency
- Eleanor May Moore – Pacifist
- Alice Frances Mabel Moss – Campaigner for women's rights
- Hon. Justice Marcia Ann Neave AO- Judge, Court of Appeal, Supreme Court of Victoria; Chairwoman of the Victorian Law Reform Commission
- Senator Jocelyn Newman – Former Senator for Tasmania
- Kelly O'Dwyer – Federal member for the seat of Higgins.
- Marion Phillips – Politician, first Australian woman to win a seat in a national parliament
- Kim Rubenstein – Professor and Co-Director, 50/50 by 2030 Foundation, University of Canberra
- Judge Meryl Elizabeth Sexton – Judge, County Court of Victoria
- Jillian Skinner – Politician, elected as a member of the New South Wales Legislative Assembly; Former Deputy Leader of the Opposition, Shadow Minister for Health, Shadow Minister for Science and Medical Research, and Shadow Minister for Arts
- Christian Brynhild Ochiltree Jollie Smith – Solicitor, second woman to be admitted as a solicitor in New South Wales, first female taxi driver in Melbourne

== Religion ==
- Margaret Ruth Redpath AO – Former Acting Precentor, St Paul's Cathedral, Melbourne, and ground-breaking surgeon.

== See also ==
- List of schools in Victoria
- List of high schools in Victoria
- List of boarding schools
- Girls Sport Victoria
