= Cumpston =

Cumpston is a surname. Notable people with the surname include:

- Gladys Maeva Cumpston (1887–1975), Australia community worker
- Hal Cumpston, Australian actor, producer and writer
- James M. Cumpston (1837–1888), American Union Army soldier
- Jeremy Cumpston (born 1967), Australian actor and director
- John Cumpston (1890–1954), Australian public servant
- Louis Bowser Cumpston (1865–1931), British architect
- Nici Cumpston (born 1963), Australian photographer
