= Kim Rubenstein =

Australian legal scholar

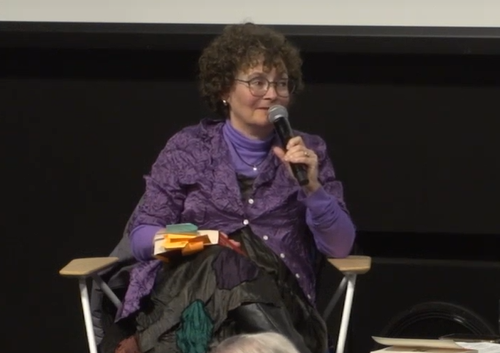
- Rubenstein in 2023
- Born: 1965 (age 60–61); Melbourne, Victoria, Australia
- Occupation: Academic director
- Political party: Independent
- Other political affiliations: Kim for Canberra

Academic background
- Education: Mount Scopus College; Presbyterian Ladies' College
- Alma mater: University of Melbourne (BA/LLB); Harvard University (LLM)

Academic work
- Discipline: Legal scholar
- Sub-discipline: Citizenship law
- Institutions: University of Canberra; Australian National University
- Main interests: citizenship, gender, oral history
- Notable works: Australian Citizenship Law (2nd ed.) (2017)

Kim Rubenstein FAAL FASSA (/ˈruːbənstiːn/ ROO-bən-steen; born 1965) is an Australian legal scholar, lawyer and political candidate. She is a professor at the University of Canberra.

She is a Fellow of the Australian Academy of Law and Fellow of the Academy of Social Sciences in Australia. Rubenstein won the 2013 Edna Ryan award for Leadership for "leading feminist changes in the public sphere" and is a gender equity advocate. In 2020 she became the inaugural Co-Director, Academic of the 50/50 by 2030 Foundation at the University of Canberra and a Professor in the University's Faculty of Business, Government and Law.

Rubenstein is one of Australia’s leading experts on citizenship, having written the major text, Australian Citizenship Law, acting as a consultant to government including being appointed a member of the Independent Committee that reviewed the Australian citizenship test in 2008 and appearing as legal counsel in citizenship matters before the Administrative Review Tribunal, Federal Court of Australia and the High Court of Australia. She comments on citizenship and gender matters in print, radio and TV media.

At the 2022 Australian federal election, she was an independent candidate in the Australian Capital Territory for the Australian Senate, but was not elected.

== Early life and education ==
Rubenstein was born in Melbourne in 1965, the older of daughters of Leigh and Susan Rubenstein. She attended Mount Scopus College and Presbyterian Ladies' College, becoming school captain of the latter. She was involved in Netzer Olami as a teenager and spent a year in Israel after graduating high school, attending a youth leadership course in Jerusalem and living on kibbutzim.

Rubenstein studied arts and law at the University of Melbourne, graduating in 1989. She was president of the Melbourne University Jewish Students' Society and joint editor of the Melbourne University Law Review, also representing the university in national mooting competitions. She subsequently worked as a solicitor at Corrs from 1989 to 1991. In 1991–1992 Rubenstein undertook an LLM at Harvard University with the support of the Sir Robert Menzies Scholarship, a Fulbright award, and a Queen Elizabeth II Jubilee Trust award.

== Career ==
Rubenstein spent 13 years (1993–2006) teaching at the University of Melbourne in constitutional and administrative law, migration law and citizenship law, promoted to Associate Professor in 2005, before moving to the Australian National University to take up a professorship in 2006. During her tenure at the Australian National University Rubenstein taught citizenship law and administrative law, and from 2006 to 2015 was Director of the Centre for International and Public Law in the ANU College of Law. In 2011 she was appointed the inaugural Convenor of the ANU Gender Institute, a role she held for two years in addition to her Directorship of the Centre for International and Public Law. In 2012 she was appointed an ANU Public Policy Fellow. Rubenstein became an Honorary Professor at the Australian National University in 2020 after her move to the University of Canberra to take up the position of Co-Director, Academic of the 50/50 by 2030 Foundation.

=== International appointments ===
- Visiting Professor at Tel Aviv Law School in 2017 and 2018 teaching comparative citizenship law course.
- Lady Davis Visiting Professor at Hebrew University in Jerusalem, October 2018 to January 2019.

== Political career ==
Rubenstein was an unsuccessful candidate at the 1997 Australian Constitutional Convention election, running alongside five candidates (including Eve Mahlab and Fay Marles) under the banner of "The Women's Ticket – An Equal Say". Their group polled 2.4 percent of first-preference votes in Victoria.

On 17 August 2021 Rubenstein announced her intention to run as an independent senate candidate for the Australian Capital Territory in the 2022 Australian federal election and established the Kim for Canberra party. Her candidacy was unsuccessful. Labor incumbent Katy Gallagher and independent David Pocock were elected as the ACT's two senators.

Rubenstein is a supporter of the Better Together Party, who intended to run two candidates as a single "job-sharing" senator at the 2025 federal election.

=== Kim for Canberra ===
Kim for Canberra
- Abbreviation: KCBR
- Leader: Kim Rubenstein
- Founded: 1 October 2021
- Registered: 18 January 2022
- Dissolved: 10 June 2026
- Ideology: Progressivism
- Colours: Dark Magenta

Website
- https://www.kimrubenstein.com.au/kim-for-canberra

In January 2022, the Australian Electoral Commission approved Rubenstein's application to form the political party called Kim for Canberra. The party received 4.43 percent of primary votes, representing 0.1328 of a Senate quota, in the 2022 federal election.

The party was deregistered in June 2026 as they had not endorsed a candidate at an election in more than four years.

== Prizes, awards and honours ==
- Fulbright 1991 Australian Postgraduate Scholar.
- Sir Robert Menzies Scholarship to Harvard, 1991–1992.
- Queen Elizabeth II Jubilee Trust award.
- Fulbright 2002 Senior Scholar.
- In 2008, Rubenstein presented the Dymphna Clark Memorial Lecture on the topic From Suffrage to Citizenship: the creation of a Republic of Equals.
- In 2012, she won a Westpac '100 Women of Influence' Australian Financial Review award for her work in public policy.
- Fellow of the Academy of Social Sciences in Australia(FASSA) in 2018 in the discipline of Law, with specialisations in citizenship, nationality, oral history, archives and law, gender and the Constitution.
- Fellow of the Australian Academy of Law (FAAL).
- In 2024, Rubenstein was the recipient of the Lifetime Achievement Legal Research Medal, awarded by the Council of Law Deans (CALD), the peak body for Australian Law Schools.

== Publications ==
Rubenstein has over 100 publications on a wide range of issues surrounding law, citizenship and gender. Some of her most prominent works include:

=== Citizenship ===
- Rubenstein, Kim (2017). Australian Citizenship Law (2nd ed.). Thomson Reuters (Professional) Australia Limited. ISBN 9780455236292.

=== Gender and public law ===
- Cass, Deborah; Rubenstein, Kim (1995). "Representation/s of Women: Towards a Feminist Analysis of the Australian Constitutional System". Adelaide Law Review: 3–48.

=== Oral history and women lawyers ===
- Rubenstein, Kim (2016). "'Alive in the Telling': Trailblazing Women Lawyers' Lives, Lived with Law". Law Text Culture. 20: 66–92.

=== As editor ===
Rubenstein co-edited a Cambridge University Press 5 volume series Connecting International Law with Public Law.

== Research grants ==
Rubenstein has been a Chief Investigator on several Australian Research Council grants:

- LP100200596 – Small mercies, big futures: enhancing law, policy and practice in the selection, protection and settlement of refugee children and youth.
- LP120200367 – The Trailblazing Women and the Law Project.
- DP130101954 – The court as archive: rethinking the institutional role of federal superior courts of record.
- DP250100382 – Auditing the auditors: Assessing capacity for gender-responsive lawmaking.

== Personal life ==
Kim Rubenstein married Garry Sturgess in 1997 and they have two children.

== See also ==
- List of Q&A panelists
- List of Old Collegians of PLC Melbourne
- Melbourne University Law Review
- Candidates of the 2022 Australian federal election
