= Rita Harris =

Rita Harris may refer to:

- Rita May Wilson Harris (1888–1975), Australian community worker
- Rita Harris (politician), American politician and activist
