= CALD =

CALD may refer to:

- Cambridge Advanced Learner's Dictionary
- Council of Asian Liberals and Democrats
- Council of Australian Law Deans
- Culturally and linguistically diverse, a term used in policy discourse related to multiculturalism in Australia
- former NASDAQ symbol between 2000 and 2001 of Caldera Systems, Inc.
- former NASDAQ symbol between 2001 and 2001 of Caldera International, Inc.
- NASDAQ symbol since 2003 of CallidusCloud
- Cerebral adrenoleukodystrophy, a rare inherited genetic disorder

== See also ==
- Caldesmon, protein encoded by the CALD1 gene
