= Thomas Lempriere =

British public official, author and artist (1796–1852)

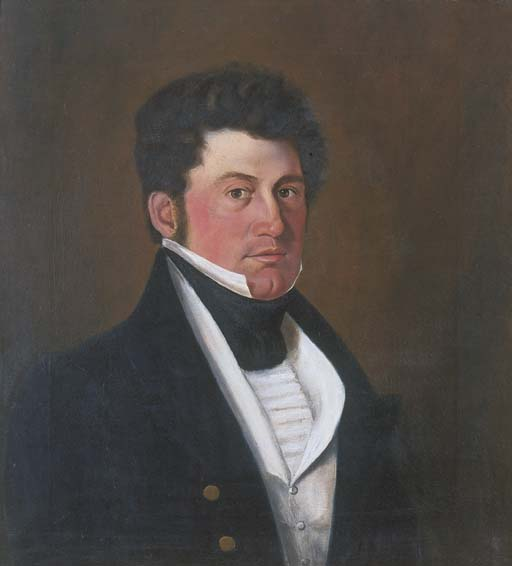
- Self-portrait, 1835
- Born: Thomas James Lempriere; 11 January 1796; Hamburg, Holy Roman Empire
- Died: 6 January 1852 (aged 55); At sea
- Resting place: Aden Settlement
- Occupations: Diarist; portrait painter; naturalist in convict-era Van Diemen's Land
- Spouse: Charlotte Smith (m. 1823)
- Children: 12
- Relatives: Emily Dobson (daughter)

Thomas James Lempriere (11 January 1796 – 6 January 1852) was a British colonial administrator in the Australian colony of Van Diemen's Land (present-day Tasmania). He is known for his diaries depicting the convict period in Van Diemen's Land, his work as a portrait and landscape painter, and his work as a pioneering naturalist.

== Early life ==
Lempriere was born on 11 January 1796 in Hamburg, Germany. He was the son of Harriet (née Allen) and Thomas Lempriere. His father was a merchant and banker from the Crown dependency of Jersey.

In 1803, during the Napoleonic Wars, Lempriere and his father were interned by the French government at Calais, where his father had a banking house. He was released and joined his mother in England, but his father was not released until 1813. Lempriere joined the British Army's commissariat in around 1815 and spent periods in France, Flanders and the West Indies. He later worked for a counting house in London.

== Career in Van Diemen's Land ==
Lempriere arrived in Van Diemen's Land in 1822 as a private immigrant aboard Regalia. He received a land grant and established himself as a merchant, becoming one of the inaugural shareholders of the Bank of Van Diemen's Land. His parents and sister joined him in Van Diemen's Land in 1825 and he went into business with his father in Hobart Town as Lempriere & Co., although the business failed within two years.

In 1826, Lempriere took up an appointment in the colonial administration's Commissariat Department. He was initially employed as a storekeeper at remote penal stations, spending time at Maria Island (1826–1827) and Sarah Island (1827–1830). He transferred back to Hobart in 1831 as a clerk at the department's headquarters, moving to Port Arthur in 1833 where he remained for fifteen years. Lempriere was promoted deputy assistant commissary general in 1837 and assistant commissary general in 1844. He was also appointed as a magistrate in 1838 and coroner in 1846. His final appointment was at Oatlands from 1848 to 1849.

=== Diaries and artwork ===
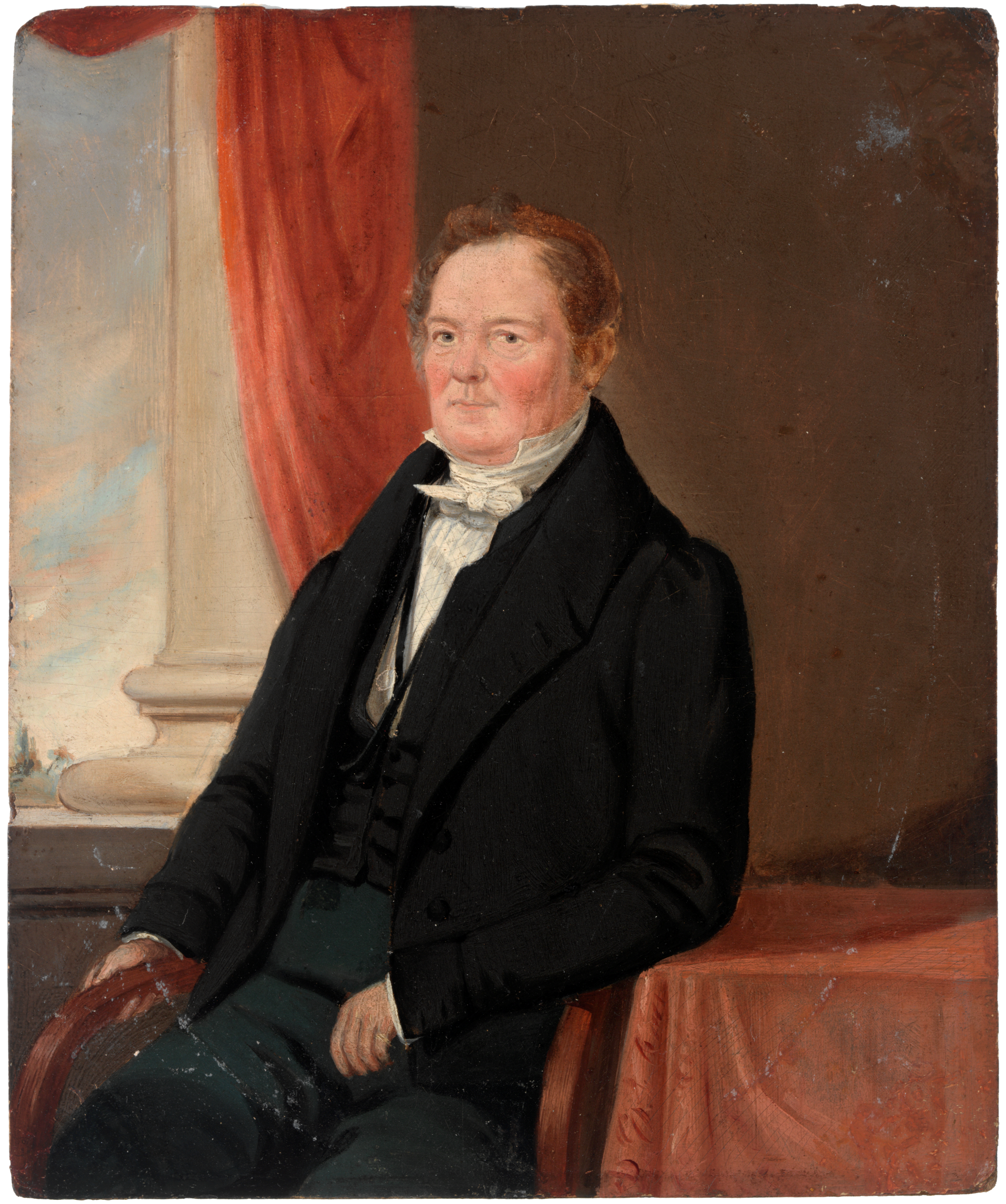
Oil painting of explorer George Evans, c. 1847

Lempriere's diaries span 1834–1836, 1837–1838 and 1847–1848 and are held by the Mitchell Library in New South Wales. He collected them for publication under the title "The Penal Settlements of Van Diemen's Land" and they were partially published in the Tasmanian Journal of Natural Science between 1842 and 1846. A full collection was published by the Royal Society of Tasmania in 1954.

Lempriere was a self-taught artist and apparently only began painting and drawing in his late thirties. According to his diaries, in 1837 sculptor Benjamin Law was "greatly astonished that anybody at such an age had begun to paint". By 1832, Lempriere was secretary of the Hobart Town Mechanics' Institution, the colony's first mechanics' institute. He commissioned a portrait from recently arrived artist Benjamin Duterrau in the same year, which was Duterrau's first recorded work in Van Diemen's Land.

Lempriere was primarily known for his portraiture which included paintings of convict commandant Charles O'Hara Booth, ship's captain William Kinghorne, minister John Manton, and fellow portraitist George Fleming Armstrong. He completed at least one self-portrait in 1835 and possibly another in 1837. He also completed several watercolour landscapes of Macquarie Harbour and "watercolour, pencil and ink sketches of scenes in Tasmania, portrait sketches, a watercolour of a bird and various copies".

According to George Augustus Robinson's diaries, in 1833 Lempriere promised to complete a series of portraits of Aboriginal Tasmanians for Robinson's benefit. A chalk and crayon drawing held by the British Museum has been tentatively identified by Gaye Scunthorpe and Cassandra Pybus as being a portrait of Maulboyheenner completed by Lempriere.

=== Naturalism ===
During his periods stationed at the remote convict settlements, Lempriere made recordings and preserved specimens of local flora and fauna, as well as tidal and meteorological observations. He frequently corresponded with British naturalist William Swainson, whom he sent significant number of samples spanning across birds, mammals, insects and molluscs. Many of these may have been used as holotype specimens, in the case of the dusky antechinus resulting in a species being named in Swainson's honour. Correspondence between Lempriere and Swainson is held by the Linnean Society of London.

Lempriere also provided samples of Tasmanian fish to naturalist John Richardson, which were stored in glass vials and are held by the Natural History Museum, London. From 1839 to 1849, Richardson published four papers drawing from Lempriere's collection in the Proceedings of the Zoological Society of London. Richardson named a species of skate Dentiraja lemprieri in Lempriere's honour.

Lempriere kept daily records of tide levels at Port Arthur from 1837 to 1842, which were published in Philosophical Transactions of the Royal Society via colonial governor John Franklin. On 1 July 1841, he and visiting Antarctic explorer James Clark Ross carved a sandstone line on the Isle of the Dead to serve as a tide gauge. This "provides one of the earliest sea level measurements in the southern hemisphere" and has led Lempriere to be described as a pioneer of sea-level monitoring.

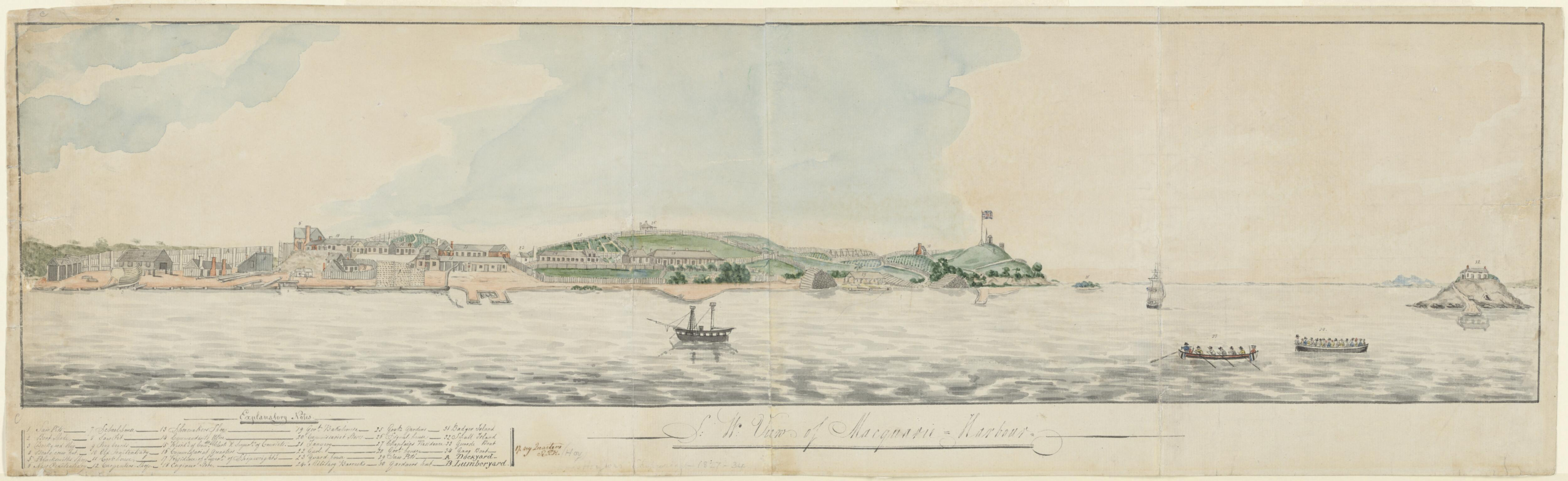
Watercolour painting of Macquarie Harbour by Lempriere, c. 1828

== Personal life ==
Lempriere had twelve children with his wife Charlotte Smith, whom he married in 1823. His daughter Emily married Henry Dobson, a future premier of Tasmania.

== Later life and death ==
In 1849, Lempriere was appointed as assistant commissary general in British Hong Kong. He was recalled to England in 1851 for health reasons but died at sea on the journey home on 6 January 1852. He was buried at the Aden Settlement in present-day Yemen.

== Sources ==
- Tuffin, Richard; Vertigan, Caitlin (2020). "Shoot, Catalogue, Eat: Interacting with Nature at a Tasmanian Penal Station" (PDF). Proceedings of the Australia ICOMOS Science Heritage Symposium: Under the Microscope - Exploring Science Heritage: 1–18.
