= Ruth Redpath =

Deacon, St Andrew's Anglican Church, Brighton

Margaret Ruth Redpath AO (born 1 April 1940) is a retired Australian surgeon and radiation oncologist. She worked as a palliative care pioneer in Australia and the United Kingdom. She has also been a senior priest in the Anglican Church of Australia, particularly at St Paul's Cathedral, Melbourne. Redpath was awarded the Order of Australia medal and awarded a Doctor of Medical Science (honoris causa) by the University of Melbourne.

== Education ==
Redpath attended Presbyterian Ladies' College, Melbourne PLC) and is named a "notable alumni" in their List of Old Collegians of PLC Melbourne. She graduated with an MBBS from the University of Melbourne in 1964.

== Career ==
=== Medical career ===
In 1965, Redpath became a resident medical officer at the Royal Melbourne Hospital. In 1975 she became a consultant radiation oncologist at St Bartholomew's Hospital and the Hospital for Sick Children in London, where she learned from an innovator of the modern hospice movement, Cicely Saunders, and the UK system of palliative care. In 1985, Redpath returned to Australia, which had a much less developed palliative care system at that time. She was medical director at Dandenong Palliative Care Service, Victoria (now South East Palliative Care), which she helped to found. She later worked at the Monash Medical Centre from 1990 to 1995 and the Peter MacCallum Cancer Institute. In these roles, she "set about building a model of specialist and community based care to meet the complex and individual needs of the terminally ill".

At the same time, Redpath was taking on wider leadership roles within palliative care and cancer care in Australia. Her roles included president of the Victorian Association of Hospice and Palliative Care (now Palliative Care Victoria) which she helped found, (1988-1992); president of the Australian Association of Hospice and Palliative Care (1992-1994); and president of the Anti-Cancer Council of Victoria (1998-2005).

=== Ordained ministry ===
Redpath was ordained deacon and priest in 2007. She served her curacy at St Andrew's Brighton and, from 2008–09, was priest in charge of St Aidan's Carrum with St Barnabas' Seaford. From 2010-2018, she served at St Paul's Cathedral, Melbourne, notably as acting precentor (2012–13) and as canon pastor (2014–18).

== Honours and awards ==
In 1994, Redpath, together with her husband, Bruce Redpath, was recognised with a Melbourne Achiever Award.

On Australia Day 2003, Redpath was made an Officer in the Order of Australia for "For service to the community in the initiation and establishment of palliative care services in Australia, as an educator in the field of professional practice, and as an advocate for improved services".

Redpath was awarded a Doctor of Medical Science (honoris causa) by the Faculty of Medicine, Dentistry and Health at the University of Melbourne.
