= Henrietta Jessie Shaw Daley =

Australian community worker

- Born: 17 May 1890; Melvern, Melbourne
- Died: 10 November 1943
- Occupation: Community Worker
- Spouse: Charles Studdy Daley
- Children: Five
- Parent(s): Thomas Obbinson(F), Rosa(M)

Henrietta Jessie Shaw Daley was a Melbourne-based community worker, also known as Jessie. She was born on 17 May 1890.

== Education and early life ==
Daley went to Presbyterian Ladies' College, Melbourne, and Rosbercon College, Brighton, and graduated in science from the University of Melbourne. Charles Studdy Daley, a civic commissioner, is the husband of Henrietta. Daley had five children.

== Career ==
Daley was the district commissioner and president of the Girl Guides Association, vice-president and president of the Canberra Mothercraft Society; Vice-president and the national board of the local branch of the YWCA; and the founder, inaugural president of ACT, National Council of Women.

== Honors ==
Daley died in 1943 and a room at YWCA, Canberra was named in her honor.
