= Winifred Barbara Meredith =

Australian doctor

Winifred Barbara Meredith OBE
- Born: Winifred Barbara Cameron; 17 September 1895; Merino, Victoria
- Died: 28 July 1979 (aged 83); Camberwell, Victoria
- Occupation: Medical practitioner

Winifred Barbara Meredith, OBE (née Cameron; 17 September 1895 – 28 July 1979) was an Australian medical practitioner and community worker. A 1921 graduate of the University of Melbourne, she worked at the Queen Victoria Memorial Hospital for Women and Children until her daughter was born in 1937. In 1946, she succeeded Vera Scantlebury Brown as the acting director of maternal, infant and pre-school welfare in the in the Victorian Department of Health.

== Biography ==
Winifred Barbara Cameron was born in Merino, Victoria, on 17 September 1895, the fourth child of Ewen Hugh Cameron, a grazier who was the member for Evelyn in the Victorian Legislative Assembly, and his wife Emma Harriet, née Nunn. She was educated at the Presbyterian Ladies' College in Kew, Victoria, and then entered the University of Melbourne, from which she graduated with her MB BS degree 1921. After a year at Royal Melbourne Hospital, she joined the Queen Victoria Memorial Hospital for Women and Children as a medical superintendent in 1923.

She married Charles William Meredith, the widowed vicar of Saint Peter's Anglican Church in Murrumbeena, Victoria, at St George's Church in Malvern, Victoria, on 6 October 1931. Through her marriage she acquired two stepsons. She continued working at her private practice in the Queen Victoria Hospital's department of obstetrics and gynaecology until her daughter was born in 1937. Her husband died on 11 May 1944, and the following year she resumed her medical career as an ante-natal medical officer in the Victorian Department of Health's maternal and child hygiene section. In July 1946, she succeeded Vera Scantlebury Brown as the acting director of maternal, infant and pre-school welfare, a position that became permanent in March 1947. That year she was awarded a Bachelor of Arts degree by the University of Melbourne.

A visit to Europe and North America in 1950 as a World Health Organization (WHO) fellow converted Meredith to the value of preventative medicine and the monitoring of early childhood development. She created a special infant welfare service for immigrants. She became a member of the Child Welfare Advisory Council in 1955 and was the Australian representative at the WHO conference on maternity care in the Philippines in 1959.

Meredith was appointed an Officer of the Order of the British Empire in the 1960 Birthday Honours. In the August of that year, she was the National Council of Women delegate to the International Council of Women conference in Istanbul. She retired that year.

Meredith died in Camberwell, Victoria on 28 July 1979 and her remains were cremated.
