= Philadelphia Nina Robertson =

Australian Red Cross Administrator

- Born: 27 February 1866; Wangaratta, Victoria, Australia
- Died: 11 January 1951 (aged 84); East Melbourne, Melbourne, Victoria, Australia
- Occupation: Red Cross Administrator
- Parent(s): John Dickson Robertson(F), Amelia, née Spencer
- Awards: Officer of the Order of the British Empire

Philadelphia Nina Robertson OBE (1866–1951), was an Australian Red Cross administrator.

== Early life ==
Robertson was born on 27 February 1866 at Wangaratta, Victoria, Australia. She was the fourth child of Amelia, née Spencer, and John Dickson Robertson. Her mother was English, and her father a Scottish Presbyterian clergyman.

Robertson was educated at Presbyterian Ladies' College, Melbourne, and learned to type and take shorthand; she later took up secretarial work. She also completed first-aid classes with the St John Ambulance Association in Castlemaine. At the beginning of World War I, Robertson was travelling in Britain; she joined the British Red Cross Society and the Order of St John and offered her services. She became a clerk until her return to Australia in November 1914.

== Career ==
In 1915, Robertson became the Secretary to the council of the Australian Branch of the British (Australian) Red Cross Society and to President Lady Helen Munro Ferguson, wife of governor-general Sir Ronald Munro Ferguson. Robertson became the General Secretary of the Victorian division in February 1921 and continued as secretary to the council. In recognition of her wartime work, in 1918 Robertson was appointed an Officer of the Order of the British Empire.

She visited London as an Australian Delegate twice to the conference of Sixteenth International Red Cross at 1938, and conference of the British Empire Red Cross in 1930. Robertson resigned from her job in December 1938, and the Victorian Division and the Central Council granted her life membership.

== Clubs and contributions ==
Robertson's contributions include publishing Red Cross Yesterdays, her autobiography in 1950; Shreds and Patches, a monograph in 1924; and An Anzac Budget and Other Verses, a monograph in 1916. Robertson was a member of the Albert Park Golf Club, the Alexandra Club, and the Victoria League. In 1950, the home for seriously disabled ex-serviceman, at Clarendon Street, East Melbourne, was named Philadelphia Robertson House in her honour.

Robertson died on 11 January 1951 in St Andrew's Hospital, East Melbourne, and was cremated according to the Presbyterian forms.
