= Ada Norris =

Australian women's rights activist and community worker

Dame Ada Norris DBE
- Born: Ada May Bickford; 28 July 1901; Greenbushes, Western Australia
- Died: 10 July 1989 (aged 87); Armadale, Melbourne, Victoria, Australia
- Occupation(s): Australian women's rights activist and community worker
- Known for: founded the UNAA National Status of Women Network in 1974 and served as President of Australia's National Council of Women

Dame Ada May Norris, DBE, CMG (née Bickford; 28 July 1901–10 July 1989) was an Australian women's rights activist and community worker. She founded the UNAA National Status of Women Network in 1974 and served as President of Australia's National Council of Women. In 1975 Norris headed the Australian International Women's Year Committee.

== Early life and family ==
Norris was born Ada May Bickford in Greenbushes, Western Australia on 28 July 1901. Her parents were English born Alice Hannah Baggs, and Victorian born Herbert Allan Bickford. When Norris was young the family moved to Melbourne where she was educated at Birchip State, Melbourne High School and the University of Melbourne, where she graduated in 1924 (BA Dip. Ed.). In 1964 she enrolled again at the University of Melbourne, this time in Indonesian studies.

On 6 July 1929, she married John Gerald Norris in Kew. John, a future Supreme Court of Victoria jurist, was later styled as Sir John Norris. They had two daughters, Rosemary (born 1933) and Jane (born 1938).

Rosemary would later be known as the Hon. Rosemary Balmford, a barrister, lawyer, law lecturer and judge. Jane completed architecture at the University of Melbourne, worked extensively in Theatre and film production design in the UK and became head of Design at the Australian Film, Television and Radio School (AFTRS; 1988-1994).

== Career ==
Norris began her career as a teacher at Leongatha and Melbourne High schools. She later was involved in community work, serving on the boards and committees of organisations in sectors such as disability, children, the aged and immigration. She became involved in the National Council of Women of Australia, joining the Victorian branch in 1935, and becoming the president of the branch from 1951 to 1954. She became the president of the national council from 1967 to 1970. She campaigned for women's rights and emancipation, such as equal pay for equal work, testifying on a wages board in a work-value case in 1967, and in an Australian Council of Trade Unions test case for equal pay. In this case, she demanded that changing attitudes to work and life, as well as women's contribution to the workforce be recognised. She travelled to conferences and workshops around the world promoting social causes and women's rights. She raised funds to build Luavi House, the first female residential college at the University of Papua New Guinea, opening on 16 April 1973.

She worked for the following organisations:

- The Victorian Society for Crippled Children (and Adults, after 1959): Foundation honorary secretary (1935-51); Vice-president (1951-76); Patron (1976-78).
- The Australian Advisory Council for the Physically Handicapped: Honorary secretary (1944-51); life member (1951); President (1955-57); Vice-president (1957-62).
- The Old People’s Welfare Council (later Victorian Council on the Ageing): Vice-president (1951-80).
- The Commonwealth Immigration Advisory Council: Member from 1950; Deputy-chairman (1968-71).
- The International Council of Women: Executive committee member (1966-78); Convenor of the migration committee (1973-76).
- The United Nations Commission on the Status of Women: Australian delegate (1961-1963).
- The United Nations Association of Australia: chairperson of national status of women committee (1976-80); International Women's Year committee member (1974-76) and the Victorian branch’s status of women committee member (1972-78).

== Death ==
She died on 10 July 1989 in the Melbourne suburb of Armadale.

== Honours ==
- Awarded the Queen Elizabeth II Coronation Medal 1953
- Ada Norris was appointed Order of the British Empire on 10 June 1954
- Appointed Dame Commander of the Order of the British Empire on 12 June 1976 "for distinguished community service".
- Appointed a Companion of the Order of St Michael and St George (in her capacity as President of Australia's National Council of Women)
- Awarded the Queen Elizabeth II Silver Jubilee Medal 1977
- Awarded the U.N. Peace Medal 1975
- Posthumously inducted onto the Victorian Honour Roll of Women 2001
