= Garry Sturgess =

Australian journalist and writer

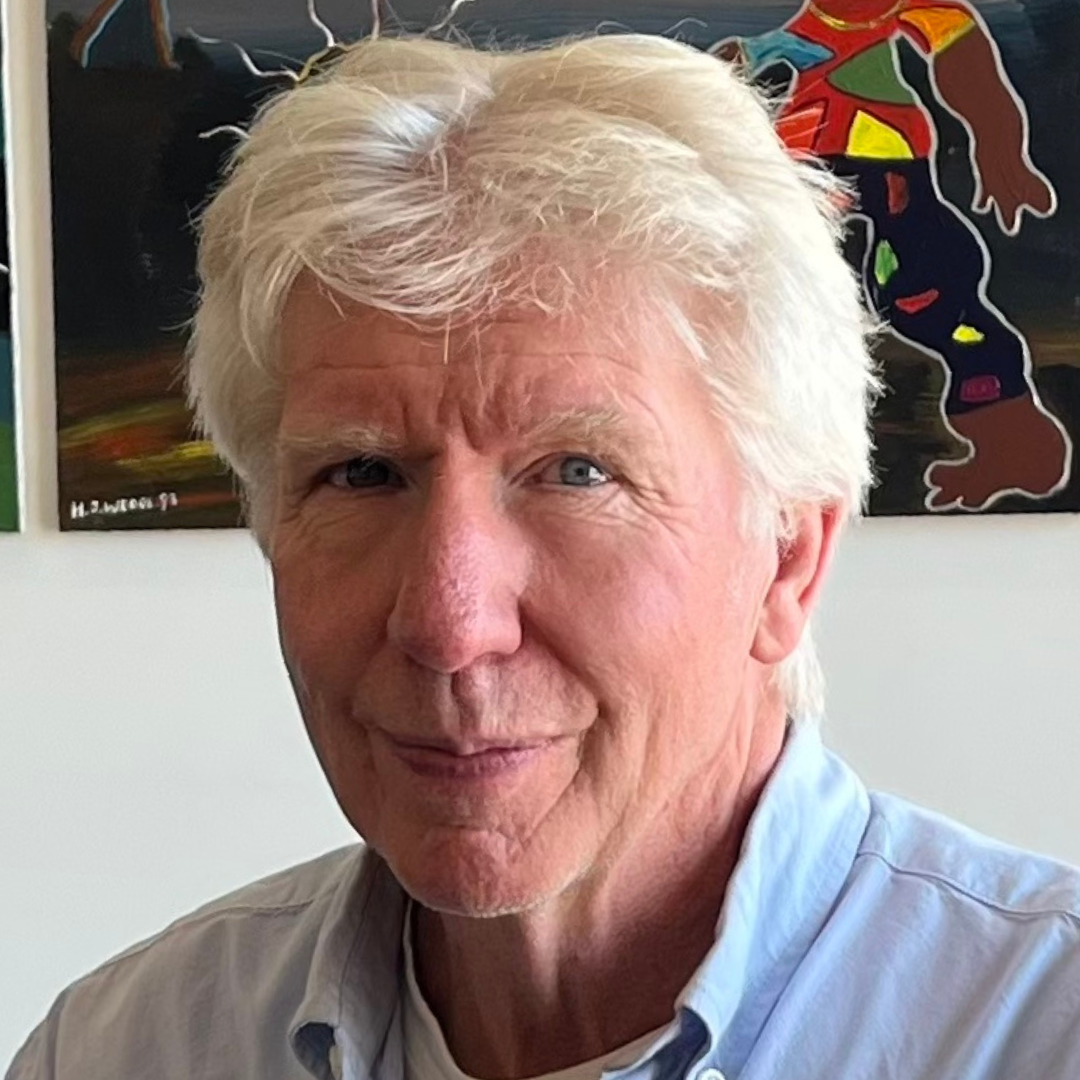
Garry Ellis Sturgess

Garry Ellis Sturgess is an Australian journalist, writer, filmmaker, lawyer, publisher and oral-historian. He is currently the publisher of Franklin Street Press and the oral history and biography website Inside Lives.

== Life ==
Sturgess grew up in Melbourne and is a graduate of Monash University (LLB; B.Juris) and Australian National University (PhD).

From 1977 to 1980 he was a freelance reporter and documentary-maker in Australia and the United States.

Sturgess was the legal correspondent for The Age in 1980–84 and was the presenter of The Law Report on ABC Radio National in 1984–85.

Sturgess practised as a barrister from 1985 to 1989 (Barrister & Solicitor, Supreme Court of Victoria; Barrister, Supreme Court of New South Wales; Barrister, High Court of Australia), specialising in media law with appearances in a wide range of jurisdictions and was a lecturer of Media Law, at Royal Melbourne Institute of Technology.

Sturgess worked as a freelance reporter and correspondent in Washington in 1989–91.

From 1990 to 1991, Sturgess was the Senior Reporter for Legal Times, covering the Federal Courts. Sturgess reported on the nomination and confirmation of Clarence Thomas to the U.S. Supreme Court for American Lawyer L.P. and for Court TV. Sturgess was the winner of the American Lawyer Group's Best Story 1991.

In 1994 he co-founded the communications provider Global Vision Media Pty Ltd. From 2003 to 2008, Sturgess was a consultant publisher at DigiTravel Publishing Pty Ltd.

Since 2010, Sturgess has been a regular interviewer of politicians, diplomats and senior public servants for the Oral History and Folklore branch of the National Library of Australia, conducting more than 60 oral histories. Interviews include former Prime Ministers' John Howard and Bob Hawke, as well as Australian cultural icons Barry Jones, Thomas Keneally and Ron Barassi.

In 2020, Sturgess was awarded a PhD from the Australian National University, for a documentary feature film, Barry Jones in Search of Lost Time – A Film Story, film script and accompanying exegesis explaining and defending the film. It examines the unique power of film as a medium for political biography using the extraordinary Australian polymath politician as the focus of the film and exegesis. It was the first time, the ANU school of Politics and International Relations had accepted a creative practice PhD combined with an exegesis explaining and defending the film.

== Broadcasting ==
=== Television ===
Sturgess was a senior researcher for the ABC's five-part television series on the Hawke/Keating governments, "Labor in Power" (1993). The series won the 1993 Gold Walkley, and the 1994 Silver Logie for Most Outstanding Factual or Documentary Program. Sturgess also produced the BBC Television's version of "Labor in Power".

Sturgess was also Associate Producer for the BBC Television program The Republic of Oz with former Primer Minister Bob Hawke.

Sturgess was the originator, co-creator, co-writer, interviewer & researcher for the SBS's three-part television series on the Howard government, Liberal Rule: The Politics that Changed Australia (2009). The series won the AFI Award for Best Documentary Series 2010, and won the Australia Directors Guild award for Best Direction in a Documentary Series 2010.

=== Radio ===
Notable broadcasts on the ABC:

- "Judging the World: Law and Politics in the World's Leading Courts" 1986, 6 hour-long programs.
- "Judges on Judging", 1986, 5-part interview series with the world's leading judges.
- "Prime Minister", 1980, 6-hour investigation of the office of Prime Minister in the post war period.
- "Federation", 1979, 2-part series examining the political economy of Australian Federation.
- "The Great Depression", 1977, 8-part oral history account of the 1930s economic crash.

Documentaries on other subjects include:

Nicaragua; Mexican Oil; Chile; Global Corporations; Human Rights; Abortion 'Theolegalogy'; Science Politics & The Bomb; Medical Malpractice; November 11; The Great War; Phar Lap; Ned Kelly;Donald Bradman; Aboriginal Land Rights; Unemployment; Alcoholism; Managing the Media.

== Publications ==
=== Books ===
- Garry Sturgess and Philip Chubb, Judging the World: Law and Politics in the World’s Leading Courts (Australia : Richmond, Vic: Butterworths ; W. Heinemann, 1988). This includes Judging By What They Say: Interviews with 42 of the World's Leading Judges, (Butterworths Pty. Ltd., William Heinemann, Sydney, London, Singapore, Toronto, Wellington, 1988).
- Bob Hawke, The Hawke Memoirs (Port Melbourne, Vic: Heinemann Australia, 1994). (Sturgess was a writer and researcher for The Hawke Memoirs.)
- Antony Anghie, and Garry Sturgess, eds., Legal Visions of the 21st Century: Essays in Honour of Judge Christopher Weeramantry (The Hague ; Boston: Kluwer Law International, 1998).
- Garry Sturgess and Bill Birnbauer, The Journalist Who Laughed (Richmond Victoria: Hutchinson, 1983).

=== Film ===
Sturgess is the director, editor and creator of Barry Jones In Search of Lost Time – A Film Story (2018) about the inspirational Australian polymath, politician and public intellectual Barry Jones. The film had screenings in Canberra, Melbourne (six-week season at Cinema Nova), Jerusalem and London. Barry Jones In Search of Lost Time was screened at the 2019 Portobello Film Festival, and was a finalist for Best Documentary. It was the first cinema release documentary feature of an Australian politician.

=== Articles / book chapters ===
- Garry Sturgess, "Murphy and the Media." In Lionel Murphy: A Radical Judge, an appraisal by eleven prominent Australians, edited by Jocelynne A. Scutt, 211–229. Carlton, VIC: MCulloch Publishing / Macmillan Co Of Australia, 1987.
- Garry Sturgess, "Through the Lens of Oral History." In Encounters with Constitutional Interpretation and Legal Education: Essays in Honour of Michael Coper, edited by James Stellios, 124–145. Leichhardt, NSW: The Federation Press, 2018.
- Garry Sturgess, "Letter From Washington", Victorian Bar News, No. 79, Summer 1991, about the Justice Clarence Thomas confirmation hearings.
- Garry Sturgess, "A Letter from America: Impeachment" Law Institute Journal, Victoria, 64(4), April 1990.
- Garry Sturgess, "The Role of the Press in the Criminal Justice System." In Professional Responsibility in Psychiatry, Psychology and Law: Proceedings of the 7th Annual Congress of the Australian and New Zealand Association of Psychiatry, Psychology and Law, edited by Ellen Berah and Deidre Greig, 107–116. Melbourne, 1986.

== Personal life ==
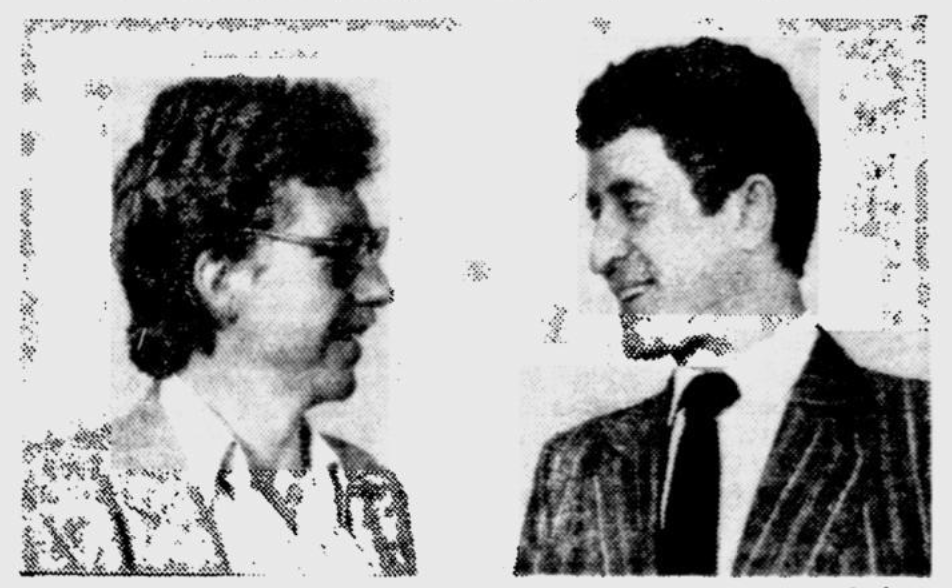
Garry Sturgess (left) and Gary Sturgess: trying to unravel the confusion.("On the Double," Age, 21 December 1981)

Garry Sturgess married Kim Rubenstein in 1997 and they have two children.

Garry Sturgess is often confused with Gary Sturgess. They are in fact, distant cousins.
