= Rita Stang =

Australian public health doctor (1894–1978)

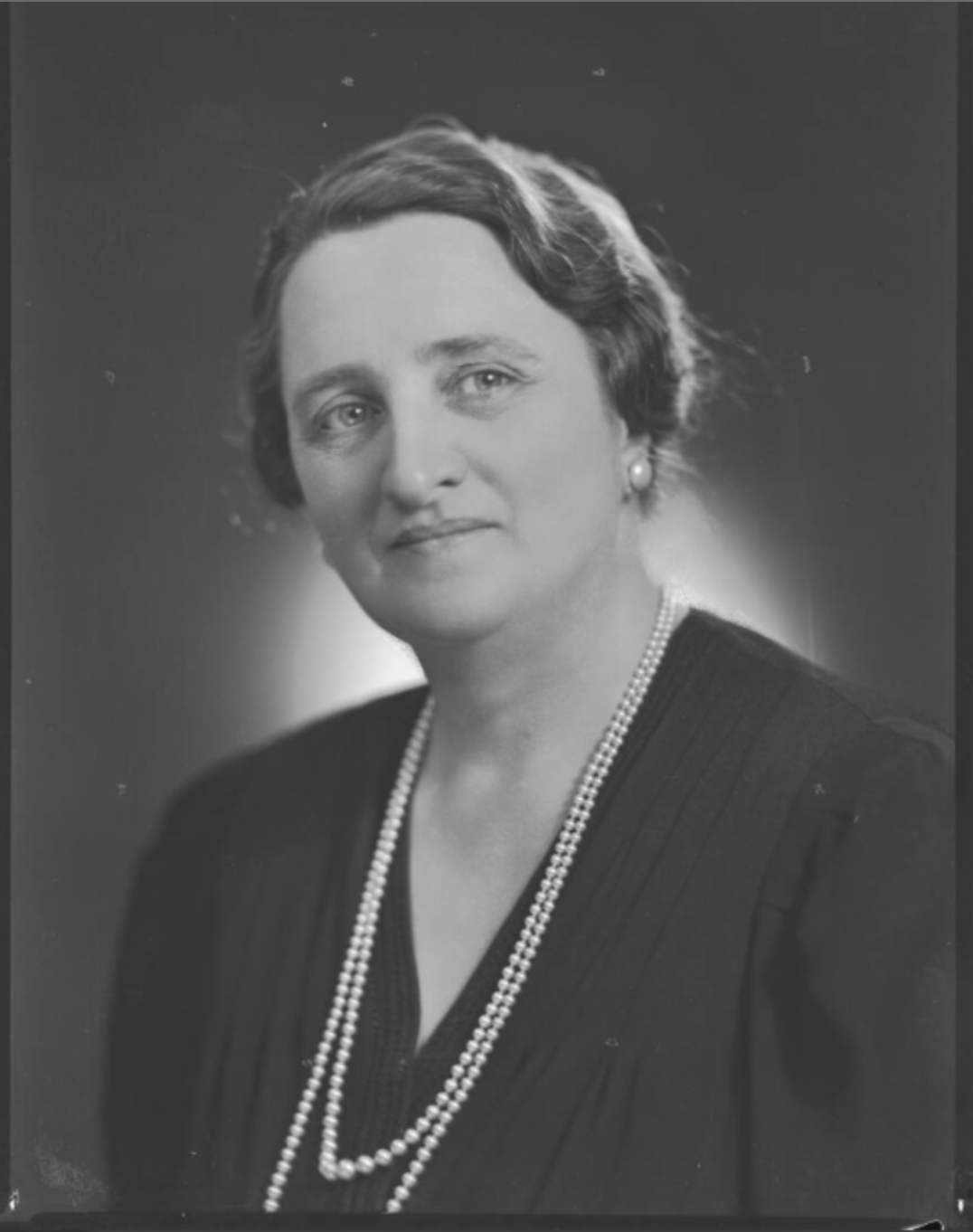
- Stang in 1942
- Born: Eleanor Margrethe Stang; 1 June 1894; South Yarra, Victoria, Australia
- Died: 18 July 1978 (aged 84); Melbourne, Victoria, Australia
- Education: University of Melbourne
- Occupation: Public health professional
- Known for: Infant health, hygiene
- Medical career
- Profession: Medical practitioner

Eleanor Margrethe "Rita" Stang (1 June 1894 – 18 July 1978) was an Australian medical practitioner. She was the senior medical officer for schools in Western Australia and adviser on infant health from 1929 until 1955.

== Early life and education ==
Eleanor Margrethe Stang was born in South Yarra, Victoria on 1 June 1894, the eldest of the children of public servant and doctor Thomas Newbould Stang and Eleanor Bath Stang (née Eastwood). She attended Presbyterian Ladies' College from 1905, before studying medicine at the University of Melbourne, from which she graduated with an MB BS in 1918. She received a Diploma of Public Health in 1927 from the same university.

== Career ==
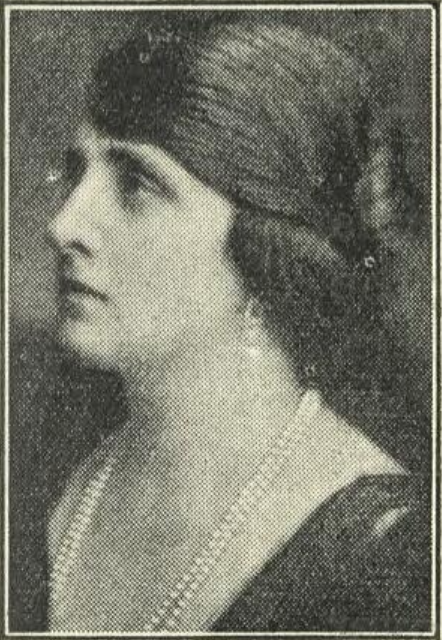
Stang in 1928

After graduation Stang worked alongside her husband as a general practitioner at Port Fairy. She later acted as resident medical officer at public hospitals in Melbourne. In 1925 she was appointed to replace Roberta Jull as medical officer for schools in Western Australia, on a salary of £500 to £600 per annum.

In July 1928 Stang went to England on exchange as medical inspector on the London County Council. While there, she studied hygiene teaching and practice, maternity and child welfare. She also attended a public health conference in Dublin representing the University of Western Australia and was a proxy participant at the congress of the International Alliance of Women for Suffrage and Equal Citizenship held in Berlin in June 1929.

On her return to Perth, Stang was appointed medical supervisor of infant health for the WA Child's Welfare Department, in addition to her school role.

In 1933 she was awarded a Bachelor of Medicine (ad eundum gradum) by the University of Western Australia.

Stang gave lectures in Perth and country areas and wrote articles promoting hygiene, effective child-rearing and immunisation against disease. She also pushed for pre-school clinics to be established to care for the health of children between two and school-age.

Stang retired from both of her public service positions in 1955 and returned to Victoria where she acted as a locum tenens and also as a ship's doctor.

In 2011 the ACT Government named a street "Stang Place" in the suburb of Macgregor in recognition of Stang's contribution to infant health.

== Personal ==
Stang married a fellow doctor, Norman Arthur Albiston, at Auburn Methodist Church, Hawthorn on 10 January 1919. There were no children of the marriage. She petitioned for divorce in 1927 on the ground of desertion.

Stang died in Melbourne on 18 July 1978 and was cremated.
