= Anna Schofield =

Early Australian Army nurse

Anna Elizabeth Schofield
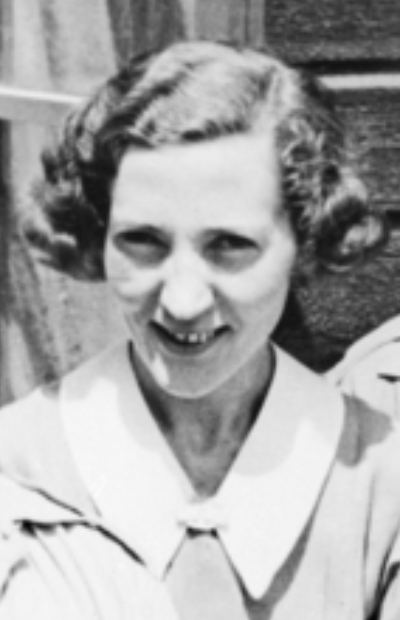
- In Qastina, Palestine, c. 1940–1941
- Born: Anna Elizabeth Whiteside; 23 February 1913; County Antrim, Ireland
- Died: 26 April 2007 (aged 94); Malvern, Victoria, Australia
- Education: Presbyterian Ladies' College, Melbourne
- Occupation: Lieutenant in the Australian Army Nursing service
- Spouse: Lieutenant-Colonel Victor Schofield

Anna "Nan" Elizabeth Schofield (23 February 1913 – 26 April 2007) was one of the first Australian Army nurses to serve in the Middle East during World War II.

== Biography ==
=== Early life ===
Schofield was born in County Antrim, Ireland to Fortescue Whiteside and Margaret Deane. She was one of six siblings. When her father died at the age of 36, the family moved to Australia, settling in Malvern. After attending Presbyterian Ladies' College, Melbourne, she graduated from training at The Alfred Hospital in 1935, specializing in theatre nursing.

=== Nursing career ===
She was in charge of the operating rooms when World War II broke out in 1939. As a member of the army nursing reserve list, she was among the first nurses called for service in April 1940. She was assigned to the 2/1 Casualty Clearing Station all around the Middle East. She set up field hospitals at Gaza, Qastina, Ameriya, and Mersa Matruh, where she treated patients at the Battle of Bardia. She wrote a memoir about her experiences titled Nursing Experiences in the Middle East 1941-1943.

=== Marriage and children ===
Schofield met Lieutenant-Colonel Victor Schofield in Ipswich, Queensland in mid-1942. The later married and moved to Geelong, raising six children: Elizabeth, John, Robert, Margaret, Ruth, and Jan. When Victor died at age 44, she moved back to Malvern, where she set up the Malvern Nurses Agency with her daughters Liz, Margaret, and Jan.
