= Lucy Charlotte Benson =

Australian musician and theatrical entrepreneur (1860–1943)

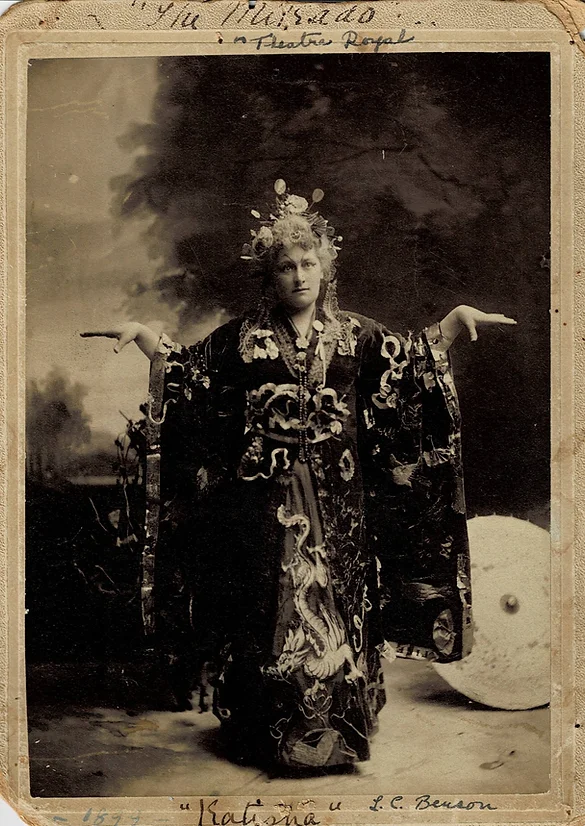
- Born: Lucy Charlotte Westbrook; 1 March 1860; Hobart, Tasmania, Australia
- Died: 14 October 1943 (aged 83); Sandy Bay, Tasmania, Australia
- Known for: singing
- Spouse: William Benson
- Children: six

Lucy Charlotte Benson (1 March 1860 – 14 October 1943) was an Australian organist, musician and theatrical entrepreneur.

== Life ==
Benson was born in Hobart in 1860. She was the first child of Fanny (born Lempriere) and William Westbrook. She had a private education. As a child she was the organist in three and later four different churches.

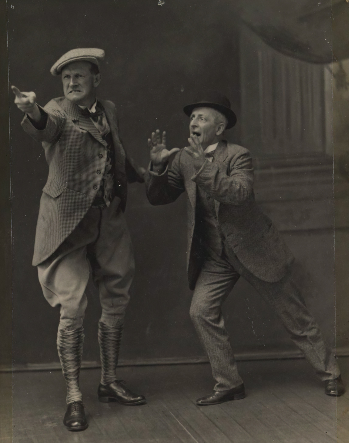
from Benson's production of The Toreador in 1926 in Tasmania.

She was the lead in H.M.S. Pinafore, eighteen months after Gilbert and Sullivan first published it. The other actors included her aunt Emily Dobson and William Benson. She was involved in producing most of the Gilbert and Sullivan operettas. She married William Benson, who also sang, in the Hobart suburb of Bellerive in 1881.

In 1905 she and her choir were given a civic reception in Hobart when they returned from Ballarat, having won the championship of the Commonwealth. The choir included eight of her relatives. She had won the gold medal.

In 1926 she directed the comic opera The Toreador or How Sammy Gigg Won the Bullfight. Benson was an accomplished singer who had performed for the Duke and Duchess of York,and was a teacher of voice production.

== Death and legacy ==
Benson remained a church organist until she was 83. She died in 1943 in the Hobart suburb of Sandy Bay. She is considered to be the first female conductor in Tasmania and the first in Australia to conduct opera. The medal she won in 1903 is part of the collection of Tasmania Museum and Art Gallery.
