= Ethel Godfrey =

Australian dentist

Ethel Florence Annie Godfrey
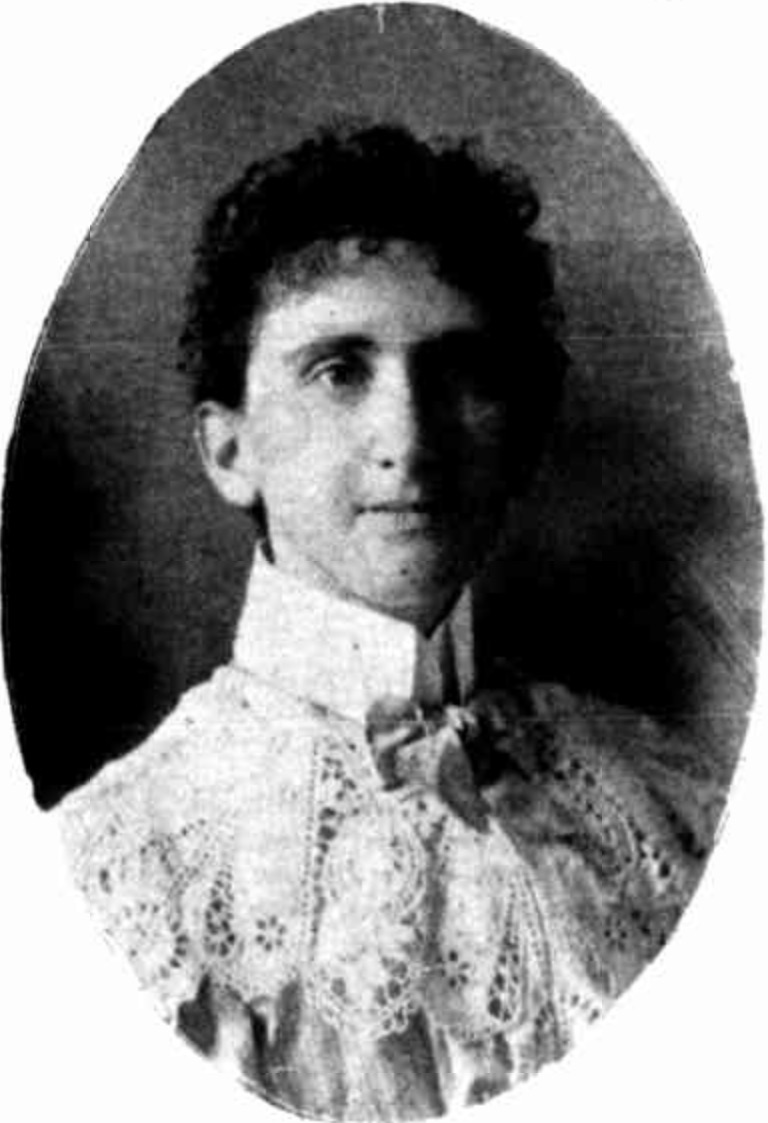
- Ethel Godfrey in 1899
- Born: Melbourne, Australia; 1871
- Died: 17 September 1956 (aged 84–85)
- Education: Presbyterian Ladies' College, Melbourne; Mr E Lenthal Oldfield’s Dental College and Oral Hospital
- Occupation: Dentist
- Known for: One of Victoria’s first female dentists

Ethel Florence Annie Godfrey (1871 Melbourne, Australia – 17 September 1956) was one of the first female dentists in Victoria, Australia.

== Career ==
Godfrey is a graduate of Presbyterian Ladies' College, Melbourne, where she is remembered as a notable graduate. She was one of four female students at Mr. E. Lenthal Oldfield's Dental College and Oral Hospital where she was a student between 1895 and 1898. She passed the Dental Board exam in November 1898 and registered as a dentist on 8 February 1899. The Victoria Hospital for Women and Children appointed her appointed honorary dentist in August 1899, the first dental appointment at a hospital in Victoria.

Godfrey practiced dentistry at 34 Collins Street in Melbourne alongside her business partner and future sister-in-law Alys Berry. When she married Dr. Samuel Arthur Ewing in 1903, she stopped her dentistry practice and had three children.

Godfrey died on 17 September 1956.
