= Mary Jermyn Heseltine =

Australian pathologist

Mary Jermyn Heseltine (1910–2002) was an Australian pathologist "and an early and forceful proponent of the adoption and use in Australia of the Pap smear for detecting cervical cancer."

== Education and career ==
Heseltine attended Ballarat Grammar School from 1921 until 1927 before Heseltine graduated from PLC Melbourne and the University of Melbourne (MBBS 1934). Heseltine went to the Cornell University Medical School in 1955 to study cytology with George Papanicolaou who invented the Pap smear. When she returned to Australia, she began the first gynaecological cytology unit in Australia at the King George V Memorial Hospital. A vocal proponent of cervical screening, she supplied slides and other educational materials, and frequently delivered lectures without charge. Her clinical peers viewed her as an effective communicator and greatly respected her as a team member. Heseltine was dedicated to inclusivity in her workforce, hiring individuals with disabilities: a talented secretary who was nearly blind, a young woman trained in cytotechnology who used a wheelchair and had significantly deformed hands, and another who was deaf. In 1975, Mary retired from King George V and assumed the role of staff specialist pathologist at in St Margaret's Hospital Darlinghurst.

She also embarked on an entirely different path by becoming a volunteer guide at the Art Gallery of NSW. Her enthusiasm, sharp insights, and humor attracted large crowds on her tours, as she moved briskly through the gallery, challenging even the younger participants to keep up. Visitors and colleagues were often amused when she humorously diagnosed the ailments and conditions depicted in various paintings.
