= Julie Gough =

Australian artist

Julie Gough FAHA
- Born: 1965 (age 60–61); Melbourne
- Known for: Sculpture

Julie Gough FAHA (born 1965) is an artist, writer and curator based in Tasmania, Australia.

== Early life and education ==
Gough was born in 1965 in Melbourne. Her paternal heritage is Scottish and Irish, while her maternal Aboriginal heritage is of the Trawlwoolway people of Tebrikunna, and her lineage has been traced to her ancestor, great-great-great-grandmother Dolly Dalrymple. She has lived mostly in Hobart, Tasmania, since late 1993.

In 1986, Gough completed a Bachelor of Arts (pre-history and anthropology) at the University of Western Australia. In 1989 she earned a Diploma of art at St Brigid's and Northbridge TAFE Colleges in Perth, and from 1991 to 1993 studied for a Bachelor of Visual Arts, at Curtin University in Perth.

In 1994, she completed a Bachelor of Fine Arts at the School of Art at the University of Tasmania. After completing a Master's degree in Fine Arts at Goldsmiths College, University of London (on a Samstag scholarship from the University of South Australia ), in 1998, Gough moved on to her doctorate, which she earned in 2001 at the University of Tasmania. In her thesis, entitled Transforming histories: The visual disclosure of contentious pasts, she explored her family history and heritage. Her thesis focused on reinterpreting the past via the artistic display of disparate objects which reframe narratives.

== Career ==
=== Artwork ===
Gough's sculptural works have included the use of kitsch bric-a-brac sourced from op shops, often featuring racist or dated motifs. Using these relics in her art is about challenging and subverting their historical meanings.

In 2001, her work, Driving Black Home (2000) contrasted with John Glover's colonial depiction of Tasmania, as part of the Australian Collection Focus series at the Art Gallery of New South Wales. The Gallery withheld Benjamin Law's busts of Woureddy and Trucaninny from the exhibition at Gough's request, noting their history as anthropological objects.

For the bicentenary of Federation, Gough was commissioned by the National Gallery of Victoria to create an artwork in response to Emanuel Phillips Fox's The Landing of Captain Cook. The resulting installation, Chase, a suspended ti-tree forest with symbolic red cloth, was reviewed by Gabriella Coslovich as sitting in an "...uneasy relationship..." in display alongside Fox's painting. Margaretta Pos reviewed the work as having stillness and menace, with a sense of "...redcoats in the shadows." One of the Gallery's deputy art directors, Frances Lindsay, described the work as extending the narrative from the painting, to the unseen context of displacement of Aboriginal people.

A survey exhibition of her work entitled Tense Past: Julie Gough opened at the Tasmanian Museum and Art Gallery in 2019.

=== Other activities ===
In September 2001, Gough presented on the "Archaeology of nostalgia" at the Portraiture and Place symposium (jointly run by the National Portrait Gallery and the University of Tasmania).

She worked as a curator of Indigenous art at the National Gallery of Victoria from 2003 until December 2004, and was a lecturer in visual arts at the James Cook University in 2005.

Gough's undertook a residency at Woolmers Estate in 2018, researching her familial connections to Norfolk Plains, Woolmers and Brickendon estates.

As of July 2019 Gough has/had a part-time role at the Tasmanian Museum and Art Gallery.

== Recognition and honours ==
In 2020 Gough featured as one of six Indigenous artists in the ABC TV series This Place: Artist Series. The series is a partnership between the Australian Broadcasting Corporation and the National Gallery of Australia, in which the producers travelled to the countries of "some of Australia's greatest Indigenous artists to share stories about their work, their country, and their communities".

Gough was elected a Fellow of the Australian Academy of the Humanities in 2021.

=== Awards and funding ===
- Samstag scholarship from the University of South Australia, 1997–1998
- Arts Tasmania Wilderness Residency, 2001
- Indigenous research joint grant (with Greg Lehman and Margaret Walter), Australian Institute of Aboriginal and Torres Strait Islander Studies, for a biography of Woretemoteyener, June 2003
- Visual Arts and Crafts Board Fellowship, Australian Council for the Arts, 2006
- State Library of Victoria Creative Fellowship, 2006
- State Library of Tasmania Research Fellowship, 2006
- Artist in Residence, Turner Galleries, 2007
- Redlands Westpac Art Prize, 2009
- Australia Council residency, Kluge-Ruhe in Virginia, 2017
- Helen Lempriere Scholarship, 2017
- Arts Tasmania residency, 2018 (funding awarded in 2017)

== Exhibitions ==
=== Solo ===
- Re-Collection, Gallery Gabrielle Pizzi, August 1997
- Ebb Tide installation, Eaglehawk Neck, 1998
- Tense Past, Plimsoll Gallery, February 2001 (PhD examination)
- Intertidal, Gallery Gabrielle Pizzi, May 2005
- Musselroe Bay, Gallery Gabrielle Pizzi, March 2007
- Interrupted, Turner Galleries, August–September 2007
- The Ranger, SASA Gallery, September 2007
- Rivers Run, Cairns Regional Gallery, February–March 2010 and Devonport Regional Gallery, September–October 2011
- Hunting Ground Incorporating Barbecue Area, Gallery Gabrielle Pizzi, October 2014

=== Group ===
- Adelaide Biennial of Australian Art, 1998
- Between Phenomena, Plimsoll Gallery, March–April 2001
- Driving Black Home in Australian Collection Focus series, Art Gallery of New South Wales, May–June 2001
- Response to the Island, Long Gallery, December 2001
- Native Title Business: Contemporary Indigenous Art, Cairns Regional Gallery, February–March 2003 (also toured in Hobart in 2004)
- If Only You Knew, City Gallery, February–March 2004
- Jumaca, Old Fire Station Gallery, March 2005
- Cross Cultures, Linden St Kilda Centre, July–August 2005
- Habitus -- Habitat: Great Walks Arts and Environment, Perc Tucker Regional Gallery, January–February 2006
- Biennale of Sydney, June–August 2006
- An Other Place, Long Gallery, March–April 2007
- Thresholds of Tolerance, ANU School of Art Gallery, May–June 2007
- Power and Beauty, Heide Museum of Modern Art, December 2007 - March 2008
- Ephemeral Art, The Invisible Lodge, February–March 2008
- Ten Days on the Island, 2009
- Mute relics and bedevilled creatures, Counihan Gallery, May 2009
- River Effects: The Waterways of Tasmania, Ten Days on the Island, 2011
- Evolving Identities, John Curtin Gallery, May–June 2011
- Terrain: Landscape and Country in the Collection, Art Gallery of South Australia, December 2011-June 2012
- unDisclosed: 2nd National Indigenous Art Triennial, National Gallery of Australia, 2012
- BLAKOUT, SCA Galleries, University of Sydney, May–June 2015
- Counting Tidelines, CDU's Nan Giese Gallery, August 2015
- Unsettled: Stories within, National Museum of Australia, November 2015
- Exhibit A, Lock-Up, December 2015
- Encounters: Revealing stories of Aboriginal and Torres Strait Islander objects from the British Museum, National Museum of Australia, January–March 2016
- Everywhen: The Eternal Present in Indigenous Art from Australia, Harvard Art Museums, February–September 2016
- With Secrecy and Despatch, Campbelltown Arts Centre, April 2016
- Unhoused, Allport Library and Museum of Fine Art, July–September 2016
- Spectres of Modernity, Ruth McHugh University Gallery, July 2016
- Who’s Afraid Of Colour?, National Gallery of Victoria, December 2016-April 2017
- Defying Empire: 3rd National Indigenous Art Triennial, National Gallery of Australia, 2017
- Black matter: origin (stage one), 146 Art Space, July 2017
- The First Tasmanians: Our Story, Queen Victoria Museum and Art Gallery, July 2017
- Book Club, Lake Macquarie City Art Gallery, September–October 2017
- Tarnanthi, at the Art Gallery of South Australia, Adelaide, October 2021 – January 2022

== Collections ==
Gough's work is held in a number of private and public collections, including:

- Art Gallery of New South Wales
  - Bind, sculpture (2008)
  - Dark Valley, Van Diemen's Land, sculpture (2008)
- Art Gallery of South Australia
- Art Gallery of Western Australia
- National Gallery of Australia
  - Human nature and material culture, installation (1994)
  - She was sold for one guinea, assemblage (2007)
  - The chase, assemblage (2008)
  - Some Tasmanian Aboriginal children living with non-Aboriginal people before 1840, assemblage (2008)
  - Hunting Ground (Haunted) & (Pastoral) Van Diemen's Land, film and prints (2016)
- National Gallery of Victoria
  - Imperial Leather, sculpture (1994)
  - Chase, sculpture (2001)
  - Leeawuleena, sculpture (2001)
  - Night Sky Journey and Tracking Self, installation (2001)
  - Kelp water carrier, sculpture (2005)
  - Drift, sculpture (2005)
  - Lifebearer, sculpture (2005)
  - Seam, sculpture (2005)
  - Land and sky from sea 1 and Land and sky from sea 2, paintings (2005)
  - Observance, film on USB (2011–2012)
- National Museum of Australia
- Queen Victoria Museum and Art Gallery, Launceston, Tasmania
- Tasmanian Museum and Art Gallery
