= Alice Maud Sewell =

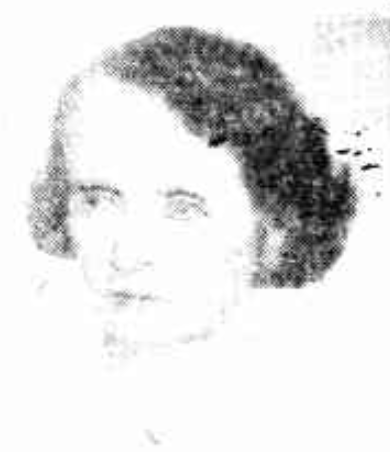
- Born: Alice Maud Cunning; 16 February 1881
- Died: 16 February 1971 (aged 90); Berwick, Victoria, Australia
- Occupation: Women's Advocate
- Spouse: Sidney Valentine Sewell (m. 1908–1949) (his death)

Lady Alice Maud Sewell (1881 - 1971) was the first woman to win the Wyselaskie scholarship in classical and comparative philology and logic. She was a founding member of the Lyceum Club (Melbourne).

== Biography ==
Sewell née Cunning was born on 16 February 1881. Sewell attended the Presbyterian Ladies' College, Melbourne. Sewell was the first woman to win the Wyselaskie Scholarship in classical and comparative philology and logic from the University of Melbourne where she earned her Bachelor of Arts degree in 1902 and her Master of Arts in 1906.

In 1908 she married Sidney Valentine Sewell (1880-1949).

In 1912 she was a founding member of the Lyceum Club (Melbourne). The club was modeled on the London Lyceum Club, with membership open to women with a university education.

Sewell was also a member of the Country Women's Association, the Victoria League, and the Ormond Women's Association.

She died on 16 February 1971 in Berwick.
