= Dur-e Najaf Dara =

Australian businesswoman

Dur-e Najaf Dara OAM (born 18 September 1945) is an Australian restaurateur and businesswoman.

== Early life and education ==
Dara was born on 18 September 1945 in Ipoh, Malaysia, in 1945.

She moved to Australia in 1962 and attended Presbyterian Ladies' College in Melbourne. She later studied social work at the University of Melbourne.

== Career ==
After graduating, Dara worked for the Youth Welfare Division of the Victorian Social Welfare Department, based at Winlaton and Turana in Melbourne. In 1978 she started waitressing at Stephanie's Restaurant and later became the manager and co-owner. She also worked on establishing the Pavilion (later Donovan's) in St Kilda and the Nudel Bar in the Melbourne business district.

In 1987, she became a partner in a tea import business and in 2000 she established the Lip café.

Dara has been involved in the hospitality industry as president of the Restaurant and Catering Association of Victoria (she was the organisation's first woman president) and board member of the Victorian Wineries Tourism Council and Business Matrix Victoria.

She has also been director of the Melbourne International Chamber Music Competition, and has served on the advisory boards of the Women's Reference Group of the Victorian Equal Opportunity Commission; William Angliss College; RMIT School of Tourism and Hospitality; and the Swinburne School of Hospitality and Tourism.

She is or has been patron of the Victorian Foundation for the Survivors of Torture; elder, Women's Circus Victoria; and a member of the Victorian Immigrant and Refugee Women's Coalition, the Tamil Eelam Women's Organisation, the Melbourne Chapter of the Australian Symposium of Gastronomy, Asia Link, Habitat for Humanity and Asia Society.

== Recognition ==
In 1997, Dara was awarded a Medal of the Order of Australia in recognition of service to the community and to promotional and fundraising activities for women's groups. Dara has also received the Vida Goldstein Award for excellence in her trade.
