= Helen Macpherson Schutt =

Australian philanthropist (1874–1951)

- Born: 17 April 1874; Melrose, Scottish Borders, Scotland
- Died: 19 April 1951 (aged 77); Hotel Barrière Le Majestic Cannes, Cannes, France
- Occupation: Philanthropist
- Spouse(s): William John Schutt, a Barrister

Helen Macpherson Schutt (née Helen Macpherson Smith, 17 April 1874 – 19 April 1951) was a Scottish-born Australian philanthropist.

== Early life ==
Born 14 April 1874, in Melrose, Scottish Borders, Smith was the only child of Australian born Jane Priscilla, née Macpherson, and Melbourne based, Scottish born timber merchant Robert Smith. She was born at Melrose, Scotland, on 17 April 1874. She lived at Fitzroy with her parents till she was seven years old and later she traveled to Europe, Britain, and Australia. Smith was partly educated at a Scottish boarding school, and at Hanover, Germany, in 1889 and later attended Presbyterian Ladies' College and learned music, German, dancing, and Elocution. She married a barrister, William John Schutt, on 11 December 1901 at Toorak Presbyterian Church, the wedding being widely reported in the press. In 1919, William Schutt became a judge in the High Court of Australia. He died in 1933, at Melbourne.

== Trusts ==
Schutt was involved in many charitable trusts like - Seamen, RSPCA Australia, and Bolton Clarke. She left a huge amount to establish a charitable trust, Helen M. Schutt Trust. In 2001, the trust was renamed as the Helen Macpherson Smith Trust, and in honor of her memory, at the Melbourne General Cemetery, an obelisk was erected.

== Death ==
Schutt died of pneumonia on 19 April 1951, aged 77, while staying at the Hotel Majestic at Cannes. She was buried in a pauper's grave at Marseilles for unexplained reasons and later exhumed, and later cremated.
