= Minnie May Gates =

- Born: Minnie May Forsyth; 13 September 1878; Willoughby
- Died: 30 August 1966 (aged 87); Caringbah
- Other name: Mrs Edmond Gates
- Occupation: community leader
- Spouse: Edmond Gates

Minnie May Gates MBE aka Mrs Edmond Gates born Minnie May Forsyth (13 September 1878 – 30 August 1966) was an Australian community worker who helped create the Big Sister Movement and who was the treasurer of the National Council of Women in New South Wales.

== Life ==
Gates was born in 1878 in the Sydney suburb of Willoughby. Her parents were Stephana (born Gates) and Robert Forsyth and they had nine children.

In 1928 she took an interest in helping women who were coming to Sydney and she formed a group within the NSW branch of the National Council of Women of Australia (NSWNCW). By the 1930s the ambition grew to open a hostel for women in Bligh Street in what is now the Sydney central business district. The hostel was largely funded by the NSWNCW from their budget for employment-relief. The initiative consumed most of their available money that year. In 1934 the NSWNCW decided that they could no longer fund the hostel and Gates decided that she would undertake its management. This was the start of the Big Sister Movement.

In 1932 she was elected the President of the Council for Social and Moral Reform.

In 1941 she was made a Member of the Most Excellent Order of the British Empire in recognition of her work with the Big Sister Movement and as treasurer of the New South Wales branch of the National Council of Women of Australia.

Gates served on the Royal North Shore Hospital's board throughout the 1940s and 1950s (as her father and grandfather had done). She campaigned to improve the hospital's child care. She stood down in 1960, the year that the Minnie Gates Playground was opened in the grounds of the hospital.

== Death and legacy ==
Gates died in 1966 in Caringbah in Southern Sydney. In 1976 the organisation she had founded centred its activities on a home it bought for the elderly in Miranda. The Big Sister Movement which had funded hostels and help the aged became the Big Sister Foundation in 2010. In 2018 it was distributing $500K to other community groups in Sutherland Shire which included money to assist the homeless.

== Private life ==
Minnie and her husband Edmond Gates had six children. Her husband was a dentist.
