= Margaret Findlater-Smith =

Margaret Findlater-Smith OAM
- Known for: Services to women

Margaret Findlater-Smith is an Australian woman who has advocated for economic empowerment for women. In June 2024 she received a Medal of the Order of Australia, for "services to women's affairs in a range of organisations".

== Career ==
Findlater-Smith started her working life employed as a radio operator with the WRANS in the 1950s, and then later entered public service. She attributes her dedication to community work and volunteering to her mother's inspiration, and has worked for most of her life advocating for improvements in women's lives. Findlater-Smith has been involved in advocating for the economic empowerment of women, through housing and salaries, in particular. She participated in the Women's Economic Security Consultation, which included a workshop with the Office of Women.

Findlater-Smith said she is inspired to work in advocacy and gender issues, because "We still haven't got equal pay for work or equal value and we still don't have the top standard for parental leave, but we are getting there."

She has worked on various boards, serving on the Equality Rights Alliance and the National Council of Women of Australia, where she was president from 2009 to 2012. She was NCWA board co-ordinator in 2018.

She also served on the board of the Women's Royal Australian Naval Service (WRANS), and is a member of Soroptimist International.

She is a board member of and was a previous president of the National Foundation for Australian Women. She is one of the "notable women" at the National Foundation for Australian Women.

== Publications ==
Findlater-Smith co-wrote a book on Goodwin Aged Care Services, and curated the material from archives, including Trove. Celebrating 70 Years of Goodwin described how a grassroots community can lead to improvements.

She spoke at the opening ceremony of the book, and the 70th anniversary, about the contributions the aged care community Goodwin has made.

== Honours ==
- 2024 - Medal of the Order of Australia
