= Rita May Wilson Harris =

Australian community worker (1888–1975)

Rita May Wilson Harris OBE
- Born: 24 January 1888; Brighton, Victoria, Australia
- Died: 21 July 1975 (aged 87); Brighton, Melbourne
- Occupation: Community worker
- Spouse: Norman Charles Harris (m. 1912; died 1963)

Rita May Wilson Harris OBE (1888–1975) was an Australian community worker .

== Early life ==
She was born at Brighton Beach, Melbourne, on 24 January 1888, the elder daughter of Victorian-born Alice Frances Mabel, née Wilson and Isidore Henry Moss.

The May Wilson family had to experience a seven-year drought at Dubbo, New South Wales, and as a result, the entire family moved to Melbourne. Harris went to Presbyterian Ladies’ College and worked at Carlton Free Kindergarten as a voluntary helper. Rita May married Norman Charles Harris on 10 April 1912 at the Presbyterian Church, Armadale. During World War II, Harrises kept open house on weekends, and numerous serviceman were entertained there with large tennis parties.

== Committee and organizations ==
Harris was a committee member and the secretary of Collingwood Crèche-Kindergarten, a life governor and a president of Keele Street Kindergarten. In 1955, Keele Street Kindergarten became Rita May Harris Free Kindergarten. Harris was the executive member, chairman of Finance committee and Vice President of the Free Kindergarten Union. To recycle and save waste materials, Harris started the Silver Door auxiliary in her leadership at 1939.

As a result of Harris work at Victoria towards Kindergarten Union, she became the Honorary Vice President of F.K.U. (Free Kindergarten Union) in 1950. Harris was also the President, Vice President, and received O.B.E at Melbourne Women's Hospital; and the outpatient's department of Royal Women's Hospital became Rita Harris Wing in 1958.

After Harris's retirement in 1950, she was involved with the Melbourne Legacy Club and raised money for the Legacy club and Red Cross. Predeceased by the death of Norman Charles Harris on 1963, Rita May Harries died at Middle Brighton on 21 July 1975.
