= Benjamin Law (artist) =

- Born: 4 February 1807; Sheffield, England
- Died: 5 July 1882 (aged 75); Moonee Ponds, Australia
- Notable work: Truganini (portrait bust)

Benjamin Law (4 February 1807 – 5 July 1882) was an English sculptor who worked in Australia.

== Career and life ==
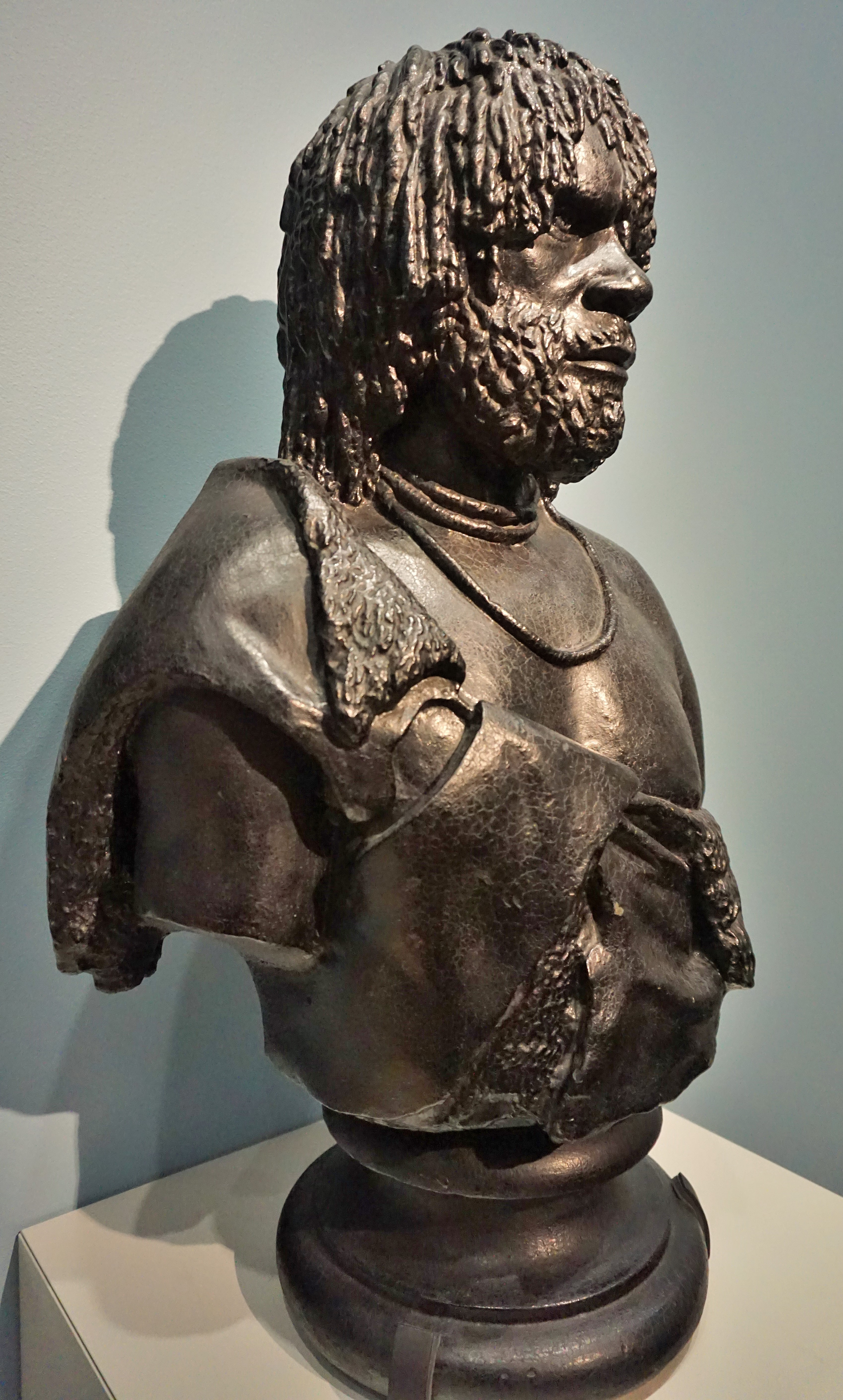
Woureddy, an Aboriginal Chief of Van Diemen's Land

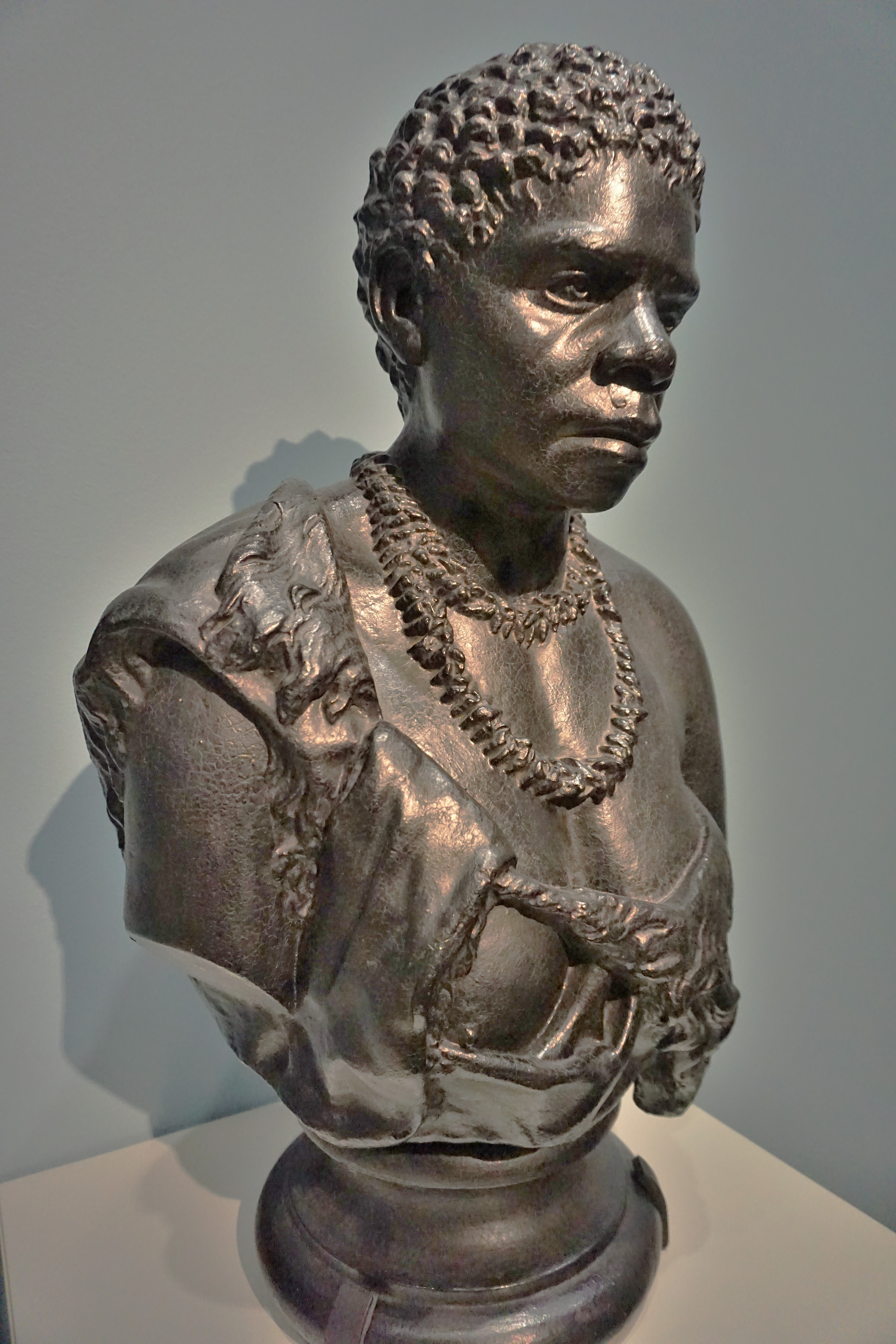
Trucaninny, Wife of Woureddy

Law was born on 4 February 1807 in Sheffield, to John Law (silversmith). He married Hannah Ellen Hilliard in October 1834, just prior to their emigration to Australia on the ship Sarah, arriving in Hobart Town on 15 February 1835.

The Laws were Master and Mistress of the Infant School in Hobart Town, and it was during their work there, circa 1835–1836, that Law completed the portrait busts of Woureddy (also written as Wouraddy, a Tasmanian Aboriginal chief of the Brune Island) and his wife, Trucaninny. Copies of the busts were sold overseas and the sculptures were exhibited by Launceston resident Henry Dowling at the 1866-67 Intercolonial Exhibition in Melbourne. They have been described as the most outstanding sculpture of the 19th century in Australia. The busts were purchased by Judah Solomon (a convict turned businessman), and there could be as many as 30 casts made, with 20 known to be held in private and public collections. There are copies in the Dumoutier's collection in the Musée de l'Homme, Paris. Plomley has suggested that other busts of Aboriginal people within this collection are also by Law.

Law was commissioned to create a bust of George Augustus Robinson in August 1835, and that same year, a posthumous bust of Dr James Ross for the Land Mechanics' Institute.

The Laws separated and were living apart in 1844, then in October 1850, Hannah died of consumption. In June 1851, Law remarried to Anne Beaton, a Scottish dressmaker. In November 1855, their almost-two-year-old son Joseph died of dysentery, and 8 days later, 24-day-old Benjamin junior died of the same condition. On 22 November 1855, Anne also died of dysentery. The remaining twin child of Benjamin junior, James Beaton, died at four months old from pneumonia on 16 February 1856. Martha Law was the only surviving child.

Law died of bladder disease and bronchitis on 5 July 1882 in Moonee Ponds. His death date has previously been erroneously listed in Glover's 1985 article, as 1 October 1890 in Westbury, but this was a different Benjamin Law.

=== Sculpture controversy ===
In 1981, Mary Mackay made a case for the busts being part of the portrait tradition, rather than as anthropological curiosities. The bust of Woureddy was modelled from a number of sittings, and both busts were considered to be commissioned by George Augustus Robinson.

In October 1988, Joanna Mendelssohn described the portrait busts as "countering the historical whitewash" within the Art Gallery of New South Wales' Great Australian Art exhibition. She notes that while the portrait busts were considered as anthropological records for many years, that their merit as analytical portraits as genocide survivors, has not been considered.

In 2001, artist Julie Gough asked for the portrait busts to be excluded from the Collection Focus exhibition at the Art Gallery of New South Wales.

In 2012, the portrait busts were included in the exhibition "Controversy: the power of art", at the Mornington Peninsula Regional Gallery.

==== Removal from TMAG's display ====
In August 2006, the Tasmanian Museum and Art Gallery (TMAG) removed the two Aboriginal portrait busts from display, pending advice from their Aboriginal Advisory Council. In 2009, the busts had been on loan from the Solomon family to the Tasmanian Museum and Art Gallery for 26 years, prior to an attempted auction by Sotheby's and a display at the National Portrait Gallery.

However, it was noted that the busts were on display in TMAG's upstairs Colonial Gallery in 2010.

In May 2010, David Hansen (former TMAG curator and then working for Sotheby's) was the joint winner of the annual Calibre Prize for an Outstanding Essay for his piece, "Seeing Truganini". The piece included reflection on the significance of the portrait bust.

==== Bust after Law ====
A wooden model after of one of the busts (created by artist John Vink in 1990, inspired by Law) was removed from an international exhibition, The Beaded Links. It was planned to be used to display a shell necklace by artist Lola Greeno, but it was decided to exclude it from display to avoid offence.

==== Removal requests ====
In 2009, Aboriginal community leaders in Tasmania wrote to museums and galleries, asking for any copies of the portrait busts of Woureddy and Trucaninny, to be removed from display. Pending further meetings, representatives of the community advised that the images of their ancestors should not be displayed without permission, as well as registering dismay at the description of Trucaninny as the last "full blood" Tasmanian aboriginal. The cultural institutions contacted by letter, included the Melbourne Museum, the University of Melbourne, the British Museum and Chicago's Field Museum. Campaigners included Aboriginal activist, Michael Mansell, Greens leader, Nick McKim, and Tasmanian Aboriginal Centre secretary Nala Mansell. The campaign began in response to a planned sale of the paired busts by Sotheby's in August 2009, with estimates between $500,000 and $700,000 and included protests outside the auction house in Melbourne. The vendors removed the sculptures from the sale hours before the auction.

=== Articles ===
- Glover, Margaret (1985). Benjamin Law 1807–1890. Early Tasmanian sculptor. Art Bulletin of Tasmania, pp. 34–39.
- Plomley, N.J.B. (November 1990). Benjamin Law, sculptor. Australiana, volume 12, number 4, pp. 96–98.

== Collections ==
National Gallery of Australia

- Trucaninny, wife of Woureddy (1836). Cast plaster, painted. Purchased 1981, accession number: NGA 81.3042.
- Woureddy, an Aboriginal chief of Van Diemen's Land (1835). Cast plaster, painted. Purchased 1981, accession number: NGA 81.3041.

The National Gallery also has a print after Benjamin Law. The lithograph is by Thierry Frères from a photograph by Bisson.

National Portrait Gallery of Australia

- Trucaninny, wife of Woureddy (1836). Cast plaster, painted. Purchased 2010, accession number: 2010.134.
- Woureddy, an Aboriginal Chief of Van Diemen's Land (1835). Cast plaster, painted. Purchased 2010, accession number: 2010.135.

State Library of Victoria

- [Bust of George Augustus Robinson] (1836). Plaster. Accession number LTS 58.
