= Emily Dobson =

Australian philanthropist

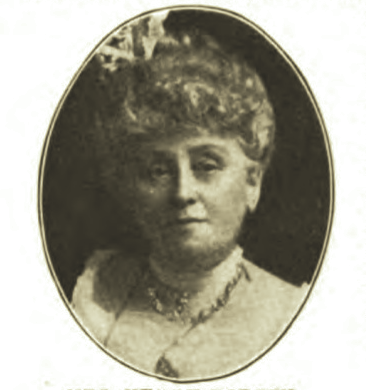
- Born: Emily Lempriere; 10 October 1842; Port Arthur, Van Diemen's Land
- Died: 5 June 1934 (aged 91); Hobart, Tasmania, Australia
- Resting place: Queenborough Cemetery
- Spouse: Henry Dobson (m. 1868; died 1918)
- Father: Thomas James Lempriere
- Relatives: Lucy Charlotte Benson (niece)

Emily Dobson (née Lempriere; 10 October 1842 – 5 June 1934) was an Australian philanthropist. She was known for her work supporting women's charities.

== Early life ==
Dobson was born in Port Arthur, Tasmania on 10 October 1842 to Thomas James Lempriere and Charlotte Lempriere née Smith. She was educated at home by her father. Her sister, Fanny, became the singer Fanny Benson who was the mother of Lucy Charlotte Benson. Emily married lawyer and politician, Henry Dobson, at the Bothwell Church of England on 4 February 1868.

== Philanthropy work ==
Dobson began her philanthropy work after her husband was elected to the Parliament of Tasmania in 1891. She became secretary of the Women's Sanitary Association in September 1891 which was founded to fight an outbreak of typhoid in Hobart. The group petitioned Hobart local council and ran candidates for the municipal election of 1892, alongside the men's Sanitary and General Improvement Association.

In 1892 Mary Jane Brabazon, Countess of Meath and her husband visited New Zealand and Tasmania. In Hobart she spoke about the success of the Ministering Children's League. It was agreed to start a group in Hobart. By 1906 there was a home in Victoria. In 1892 Dobson's founded a local Ministering Children's League. In 1898 she founded the ladies' committee of the Blind, Deaf and Dumb Institution. Dobson also supported nursing institutions and was one of the founders of the New Town Consumptives' Sanatorium in 1905 as well as being a life-long patron of the Tasmanian Bush Nursing Association.

Dobson was also a supporter of temperance and was the vice-president of the Women's Christian Temperance Union of Tasmania.

In 1899, she became vice-president of the newly founded National Council of Women of Tasmania and attended the 1899 International Council of Women meeting in London and was a delegate at the International Woman Suffrage Alliance Congress in Amsterdam in 1908. In 1919, the National Council of Women of Tasmania established the Emily Dobson Philanthropic Prize in recognition of her work.

Dobson died in Hobart on 5 June 1934 and was buried in Queenborough cemetery.
