= National Council of Women of Australia =

Australian organization founded in 1931

The National Council of Women of Australia (NWA) is an Australian organisation founded in 1931. The council is an umbrella organisation with which are affiliated seven State and Territory National Councils of Women. It is non-party political, non-sectarian, volunteer organisation and open to all women. It first affiliated with the International Council of Women in 1896, through the New South Wales NCW. That NSW organisation was created on 26 August 1896 in Sydney Town Hall by eleven women-related organisations.

The Constituent councils were formed in:

- New South Wales −1896
- Tasmania – 1899,
- Victoria and South Australia – 1902
- National Council of Women of Queensland – 1905
- Western Australia −1911
- Australian Capital Territory −1939
- Northern Territory – 1964.

The NCWA works on a Triennium basis and holds a conference every 18 months to encourage participation in its policy platform.

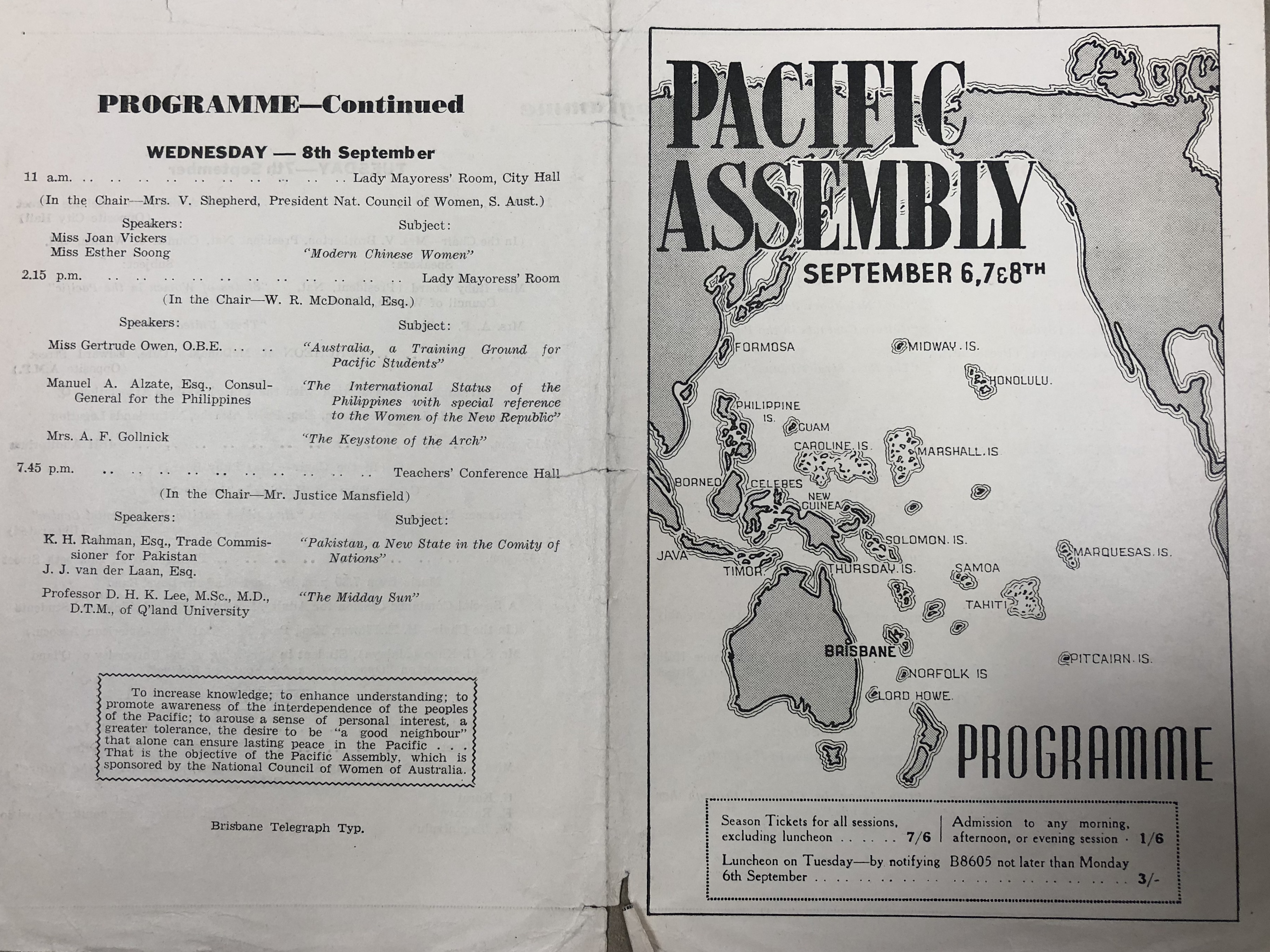
A Programme made for the Pacific Assembly in the mid 1900s. Includes the first and last pages of the programme.

The Pacific Assembly was a gathering in Brisbane City, Australia, over a three-day period in the 20th century. The assembly was sponsored by the National Council of Women. The gathering included representatives from many different countries around the world.

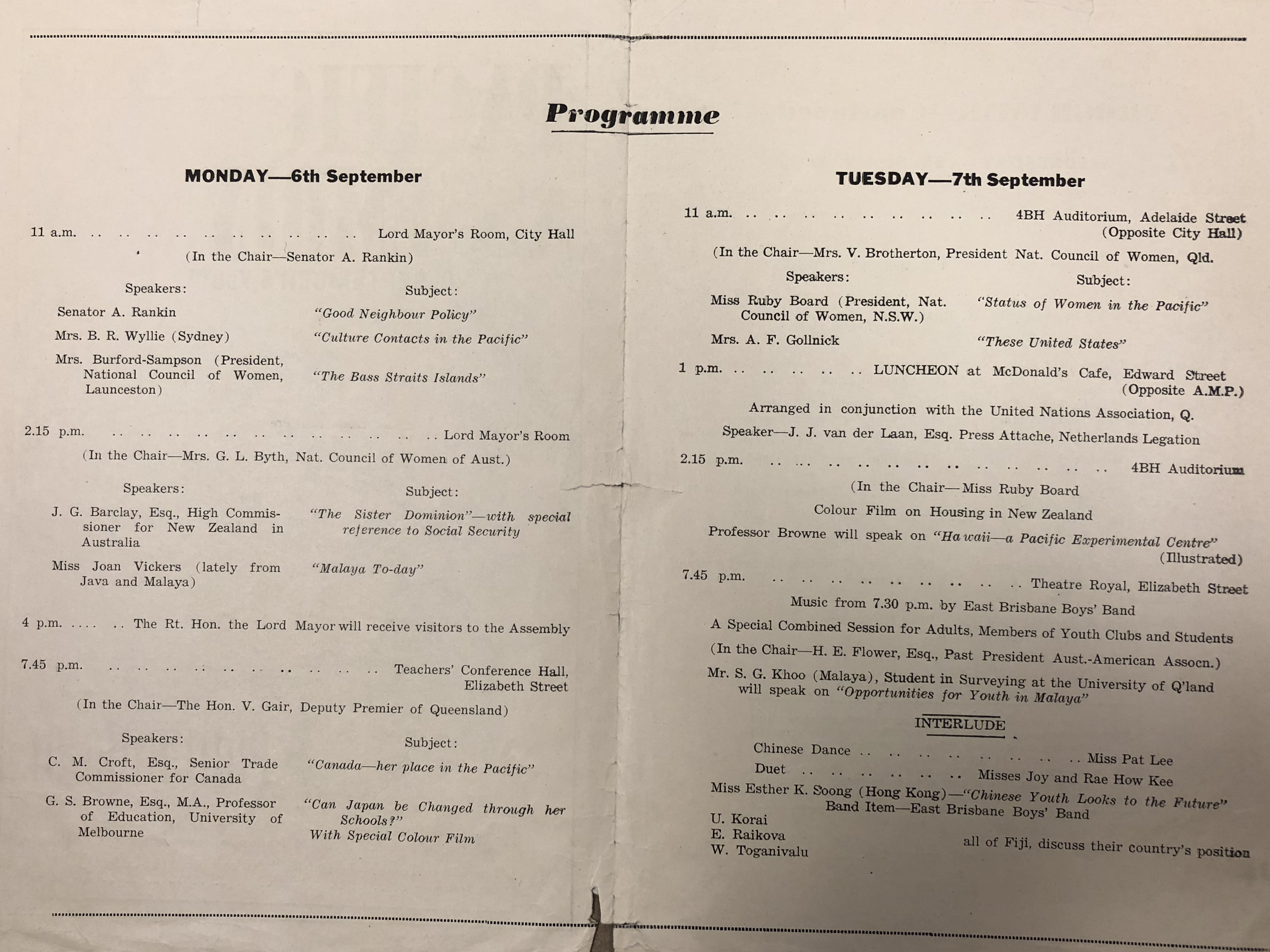
Pages 2 and 3 of the Pacific Assembly programme made in the mid 1900s.

== Notable women ==
Women associated with the Council include Diane Alley, Alice Evelyn Rawson, Yvonne Bain, Gracia Baylor, Ruby Board, Ivy Brookes, Elsie Byth, Margaret Davey, Emily Dobson, Leonie Christopherson, Edith Cowan, Dorothy Edwards, Margaret Findlater-Smith, Maureen Giddings, Ruth Gibson, treasurer Minnie May Gates, Vida Goldstein, Helen Elizabeth Gillan, Ann Hamilton, Margaret Emily Hodge, Esther Lipman, Irene Longman, Laurel Macintosh, Joyce McConnell, Margaret McIntyre, Thelma Metcalfe, Adelaide Miethke, Mabel Miller, Necia Mocatta, May Moss, Mildred Muscio, Ada Norris, Judith Parker, Audrey Reader, Gwen Roderick, Jessie Scotford, Edith Helen Barrett, Lillias Skene and Zara Aronson.

=== List of presidents ===
List of federal presidents of the NCWA:

- 1906–24: Emily Dobson
- 1924–27: Lillias Skene
- 1927–31: Mildred Muscio
- 1931–36: May Moss
- 1936–42: Adelaide Miethke
- 1942–44: Ruby Board
- 1945–48: Elsie Byth
- 1948–52: Ivy Brookes
- 1953–56: Ruth Gibson
- 1957–60: Thelma Metcalfe
- 1960–64: Dorothy Edwards
- 1964–67: Anne Hamilton
- 1967–70: Ada Norris
- 1970–73: Jessie Scotford
- 1973–76: Joyce McConnell
- 1976–79: Margaret Davey
- 1979–82: Laurel Macintosh
- 1982–85: Diane Alley
- 1985–88: Necia Mocatta
- 1988–91: Maureen Giddings
- 1991–94: Yvonne Bain
- 1994–97: Gwen Roderick
- 1997–00: Gracia Baylor
- 2000–03: Judith Parker
- 2003–06: Leonie Christopherson
- 2006–09: Hean Bee Wee
- 2009–12: Margaret Findlater-Smith
- 2012–15: Julie Morris
- 2015–18: Barbara Baikie
- 2018–2021: Robyn Nolan
- 2021–: Chiou See Anderson

== Archives ==
Its archives – pre the current Triennium – are held by the National Library of Australia for use by researchers.

Records of National Council of Women NSW activity are held by the NSW State & Records Authority, e.g. 1918 correspondence to Minister for Justice concerning women's citizen's rights and conditions of women prisoner.

== Works ==
- Balancing Work and Life – A Guide for Employers and Employees 1999. To avoid confusion with current day legislation and practice, this booklet is no longer available.
- From a Camel to the Moon (ISBN 0-646-38702- 2) 1999 An Anthology for the International Year of Older Persons,
- From the Heart (ISBN 0 9581638-0-4) 2002 – Women's experiences of the Australian Outback, to mark the Year of the Outback.
- 45 years on: What now in Contraceptives? Published in 2006 – This booklet includes information about research at the time (2006), with articles by Professor Gab Kovacs, Dr Neisha Wratten, and a piece by Dr Terri Foran on the history of contraceptives.
- A website has been created as a review of the NCWA presidents 1906–2006 – Stirrers with Style.

== See also ==
- Feminism in Australia
