= Solomon family =

19th-century British-Jewish family of merchants and painters

The Solomon family was a prominent family of Jewish merchants and painters in England known for their integration into respectable middle-class Victorian society in fashion despite systemic barriers on Jews in the 19th century and for their cultural impact by placing Jewish artwork into British prominence. They are also known for their amateur acting productions.

The Solomon family was of Jewish descent. Aaron Solomon immigrated to England from the Dutch Republic in the mid-18th century and had engaged in importing and selling Leghorn hats from Italy; during the Napoleon era, he developed a method of making them to continue his profitable business due to the import interruption. He was the first Orthodox Jew allowed to conduct business in the region.

In 1831, Meyer Solomon was the first Jew admitted to the Freedom of the City of London, providing the family upward social mobility that was not typically afforded to the Jewish during that time period, due to prejudice and impoverished economic conditions. When the hat business became unprofitable, he developed a method for producing embossed doilies and opened a factory, resulting in a much more lucrative fortune for the family. The family participated in Jewish practices such as Passover, but were not strictly observing of all Jewish customs. His wife, Kathe née Levey, was an artist who painted miniature figures.

Their rising socioeconomic status allowed the Solomon family admittance to the Royal Academy Schools to train as artists. All three children—Abraham Solomon, Rebecca Solomon, and Simeon Solomon—were given spots in the Royal Academy Summer Exhibition. The works of the Solomon family produced during this is considered an "epitome of the major trends of Victorian painting" of the late 19th century. They bridged Pre-Raphaelite, academic, and aesthetic art movements, and introduced religious iconography, particularly Jewish, and gender and sexuality into their works, all of which challenged conventions at the time. They were an important part of the Pre-Raphaelite Brotherhood. The material culture of the work of the Solomon family draws on medieval devotional and grotesque imagery and engages antisemitic blood-myth stereotypes.

In mid-1980s, the Geffrye Museum and the Birmingham City Art Gallery held exhibitions on the Solomon family, which led to the discovery of lost works of Rebecca's.
