= Joan Rose Dwyer =

Australian lawyer (1940–2019)

Joan Rose Dwyer OAM
- Born: 16 May 1940; Melbourne, Victoria, Australia
- Died: 11 September 2019 (aged 79); Melbourne, Victoria, Australia
- Occupation(s): Lawyer, barrister, solicitor, chairperson and Tribunal member

Joan Rose Dwyer OAM (16 May 1940 – 11 September 2019) was an Australian lawyer, barrister, solicitor, Chairperson, and Tribunal member.

Born in Melbourne on 16 May 1940, Dwyer graduated from the University of Melbourne in 1961. She became a solicitor in 1963 and a barrister in 1978. Dwyer was a research assistant for Sir Zelman Cowen and also for Queen Elizabeth II's solicitors in London.

Dwyer served as chairperson of the Equal Opportunity Board (Vic). She was a senior member of the Administrative Appeals Tribunal and a member of the Mental Health Review Board.

Dwyer was awarded the Medal of the Order of Australia in the 2005 Queen's Birthday Honours for "service to the community, particularly through the DEAL Communication Centre and to the law".

Dwyer died in Melbourne on 11 September 2019 after a five-year battle with cancer.
