= Hilda Stevenson =

Australian philanthropist

Dame Dame Hilda Mabel Stevenson DBE
- Born: Hilda Mabel McKay; 1893; Ballarat, Victoria, Australia
- Died: 1987 (aged 93–94)
- Occupations: Philanthropist, community worker
- Spouses: Cleveland James Kidd; Colonel George Ingram Stevenson
- Children: 1
- Father: Hugh Victor McKay

Dame Hilda Mabel Stevenson DBE (née McKay, formerly Kidd; 1893–1987) was an Australian philanthropist and community worker. She was the daughter of Hugh Victor McKay, a combine harvester inventor. She was the trustee and founder of the Sunshine Foundation.

== Education and early life ==
Born as Hilda Mabel McKay in Ballarat, Victoria, her father was Hugh Victor McKay, the inventor of the first commercially viable combine harvester. She attended Clarendon College and Presbyterian Ladies' College. Her first marriage was in 1916 to Cleveland James Kidd, who died in 1923. In 1936, she remarried to Colonel George Ingram Stevenson, CMG. She had one child, a daughter, by her first marriage.

== Philanthropy ==
- Royal Children's Hospital in Melbourne – she donated £100,000 in 1958 for the establishment of a Chair of Paediatrics at the hospital, to be administered by the University of Melbourne
- Florey Laboratories (University of Melbourne programme)
- International House (University of Melbourne programme)
- Sunshine Foundation, founder/trustee
- Victorian Arts Centre

== Association ==
In addition to working with the management committees of the Royal Children's Hospital, Melbourne and Melbourne University, Stevenson was also heavily involved in the Victoria Lawn Tennis Association, The Alexandra Club, Melbourne, and Peninsula Golf Club. On 31 December 1960, she was appointed an Officer of the Order of the British Empire, recognizing her social welfare work and Philanthropy. She was further made Commander of the Order of the British Empire in 1963 and a Dame Commander of the Order of the British Empire in 1968. The University of Melbourne awarded Hilda with an honorary doctorate of laws in 1973.

== Honors and recognition ==
- Officer of the Order of the British Empire, 31 December 1960
- Commander of the Order of the British Empire 8 June 1963
- Dame Commander of the Order of the British Empire, 1 January 1968
- Honorary doctorate of laws by the University of Melbourne, 1973

== Archival resources ==
- University of Melbourne, Baillieu Library Special Collections Papers, 24 March 1980—19 November 1980, 81/110; The University of Melbourne, Baillieu Library Special Collections.
