= Jessie McLaren =

- Born: 1883
- Died: 1968 (aged 84–85)
- Education: Master of Arts in philosophy
- Occupations: Australian missionary, gardener, translator, and teacher
- Spouse: Dr. Charles I. McLaren
- Children: Rachel Human

Jessie McLaren (1883-1968) was an Australian teacher, translator, gardener, missionary, and book collector. She spent thirty years in Korea and developed a library of rare Korean books, which her daughter, Rachel Human, donated to the National Library of Australia where it forms the McLaren-Human Collection.

== Education and early life ==
McLaren was a graduate in English and history and had a Master of Arts in Philosophy from the University of Melbourne. McLaren started her career as a traveling secretary for the SCM (Student Christian Movement) in New Zealand and Australia. She then founded the Mrs. Paton Memorial Hospital and later became a volunteer to assist the Korean people and taught in Ewha's Women's College. She died in 1968.
