= James M. Cumpston =

- Born: c. 1837; Gallia County, Ohio
- Died: May 24, 1888; Ohio
- Burial place: Coalton Cemetery, Coalton, Ohio
- Military career
- Allegiance: United States
- Branch: United States Army; Union Army
- Rank: Private
- Unit: 91st Ohio Volunteer Infantry Regiment
- Conflicts: American Civil War • Valley Campaigns of 1864
- Awards: Medal of Honor

James M. Cumpston (c. 1837 – May 24, 1888) was a Union Army soldier during the American Civil War. He received the Medal of Honor for gallantry during the Valley Campaigns of 1864.

== Medal of Honor citation ==
The President of the United States of America, in the name of Congress, takes pleasure in presenting the Medal of Honor to Private James M. Cumpston, United States Army, for extraordinary heroism from August to November, 1864, while serving with Company D, 91st Ohio Infantry, in action in the Shenandoah Valley Campaign, Virginia, for capture of flag.

== See also ==
- List of Medal of Honor recipients
- List of American Civil War Medal of Honor recipients: A–F
