= May Moss =

Australian suffragist (1869–1948)

- Born: Alice Frances Mabel Wilson; 27 April 1869; Ballarat, Victoria, Australia
- Died: 18 July 1948 (aged 79); Melbourne, Victoria, Australia
- Education: Presbyterian Ladies' College
- Occupations: Social Activist, Suffragette
- Spouse: Isidore Henry Moss (m. 1887)

Alice "May" Moss, CBE (27 April 1869 – 18 July 1948) was an Australian welfare worker and women's rights activist.

== Early life ==
She was born as Alice Frances Mabel Wilson in Ballarat and was educated at the Presbyterian Ladies' College in East Melbourne. She married grazier Isidore Henry Moss in March 1887 and they had two daughters.

== Career ==
While her children were young, Moss began to campaign for the rights of women and served as vice-president of the Australian Women's National League in 1906–14, during that time she actively campaigned in Victoria for women's suffrage. She was a member of the National Council of Women of Victoria from its formation in 1904. In 1914 she relinquished her position as vice-president of the Australian Women's National League at the onset of World War I in order to become the (then) only female member of the Victorian recruiting committee for the Armed Services.

She was an Australian delegate at the League of Nations Assembly at Geneva in 1927, where she was the first woman to sit on a finance committee. She attended the International Council of Women in Geneva in the same year and in 1928 was elected as vice president of the ICW, a position she held until her death.

She was the first president of the National Council of Women of Australia, serving from 1931 to 1936. She was involved in organising the centenary of Melbourne celebrations, she was on the executive of the Victorian and Melbourne Centenary Celebrations Council and chaired the Women's Centenary Council. She was the first female non-professional member of the National Health and Medical Research Council.

Moss died on 18 July 1948, in a private hospital in Melbourne.

Moss Street, in the Canberra suburb of Cook, is named in her honour. Moss was posthumously inducted onto the Victorian Honour Roll of Women in 2008.
