= Gladys Maeva Cumpston =

Australian Braille transcriber

- Born: 31 May 1887; Rosedale Victoria, Australia.
- Died: 18 June 1975 (aged 88)
- Resting place: Red Hill
- Occupations: Community worker, horticulturist, Voluntary Aid Detachment personnel
- Known for: Gardening, community work, and braille transcript
- Children: Three sons and four daughters

Gladys Maeva Cumpston (1887–1975), was an Australia community worker, horticulturist, a braille transcriber and also a member of the Voluntary Aid Detachment, born on 31 May 1887 at Rosedale Victoria, Australia.

== Early life and education ==
Gladys Marva Cumpston was born on 31 May 1887 at Rosedale Victoria, Australia. She learned by Governesses and went to Shirley College and Presbyterian Ladies’ College, Melbourne. John Howard Lidgett Cumpston, a Historian and first Federal Director of health at Australia, is the husband of Gladys. Cumpston had three sons and four daughters. After her husband's death in 1954, Cumpston promoted the publication of Johns historical research.

== Member ==
Cumpston was an active member of society such as Native Plant cultivating Society; Canberra Mothercraft Society; Canberra Nursery Kindergarten Society; Canberra Horticultural Society; Australian Red Cross Society; and Canberra and District Historical Society.

== Honors and recognitions ==
Cumpston won the Lady Gowrie Challenge Cup in 1949 and Ormond Cup in 1936. The Queensland Braille Writing Association recorded Gladys name in the honor board for her services as a Braille Transcriber.
