= Council of Australian Law Deans =

Peak body for law schools in Australia

The Council of Australian Law Deans (CALD) is an unincorporated association and the peak body of Australian law schools.
