= Presbyterian Ladies' College, Melbourne =

Location
- 141 Burwood Highway; Burwood, Victoria, 3125; Australia; 37°50′52″S 145°6′23″E

Information
- Type: Independent, single-sex, day and boarding, Christian school
- Motto: Latin: Lex Dei Vitae Lampas (The law of God is the Lamp of Life)
- Denomination: Presbyterian
- Established: 1875
- Chairman: Mark Chew
- Principal: Dr Emma Burgess
- Years: ELC–12
- Gender: Girls
- Enrolment: ~1,600
- Colours: Blue, black and gold
- Affiliation: Girls Sport Victoria
- Website: plc.vic.edu.au

Presbyterian Ladies' College, Melbourne (PLC), is an independent, private, Presbyterian, day and boarding school for girls, located in Burwood, an eastern suburb of Melbourne, Victoria, Australia.

Founded in 1875 at East Melbourne, PLC was one of the first independent schools for girls in Australia. The College has a non-selective enrolment policy and in 2007 catered for approximately 1,550 students from the Early Learning Centre (ELC) to Year 12, including 100 boarders. PLC features a co-educational Early Learning Centre, and a girls-only environment from Prep to Year 12. The college has been an IB World School since September 1990, and is authorised to offer the IB Diploma Programme.

PLC is affiliated with the Association of Heads of Independent Schools of Australia (AHISA), the Junior School Heads Association of Australia (JSHAA), the Alliance of Girls' Schools Australasia (AGSA), the Association of Independent Schools of Victoria (AISV), the Australian Boarding Schools Association (ABSA), is a founding member of Girls Sport Victoria (GSV), and is an accredited school of the Council of International Schools (CIS).

In 2001 The Sun-Herald named PLC Melbourne the best girls' school in Australia on the basis of the number of its alumni mentioned in Who's Who in Australia (a listing of notable Australians).^{[a]}

== History ==
Wood engraving of the planned Ladies' College, 1875. Only half was eventually built.

The Assembly of the Presbyterian Church of Victoria set up an education committee in 1869 to look into establishing a ladies' college. At this time the Church owned 2 acres (1 ha) in Albert Street, East Melbourne, opposite the current Fitzroy Gardens, and not far from the original site of the school's brother school, Scotch College. A school building and a teachers' home were already built on the site, and were rented to a teacher as a primary school. The committee resolved to build the college and provide advice and support, but the college would be self-supporting.

Joseph Reed drew plans for a building that would house 30 boarders and 150 day students, at an estimated cost of £12,000. They decided to draw a line down the middle of the plans and build one section only.

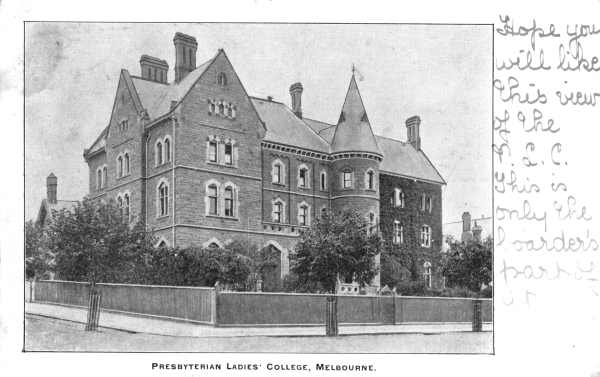
The original PLC building at East Melbourne, c. 1905

The building was completed in time for the school's first year, 1875, with Charles Henry Pearson as founding principal. Pearson served as principal until 1879, when Andrew Harper took over. While other private (church-run) girls' schools had existed before PLC, the school was Australia's first school for girls to offer a program and education equal to that of a boys' school modelled on the great English Public Schools.

By 1938 the East Melbourne buildings were at maximum capacity, and the college council began a search for a new site for the school. In 1939 they purchased a property in the suburb of Burwood, called Hethersett. The Junior School was moved in 1939, but the complete move was delayed by the outbreak of the Second World War. The school's current motto, Lex Dei Vitae Lampas ("The Law of God is the Lamp of Life"), was introduced during the Second World War, as the original German motto, Ohne Hast Ohne Rast (Without haste: without rest"), was deemed inappropriate.

On 29 September 1956 Lady Brooks, the wife of General Sir Dallas Brooks, Governor of Victoria, laid the foundation stone for the new school buildings at Burwood, and the senior school moved in 1958. The school's original buildings at East Melbourne were demolished that same year to make way for a Masonic centre, which was itself later demolished to make way for a further building.

== Boarding ==
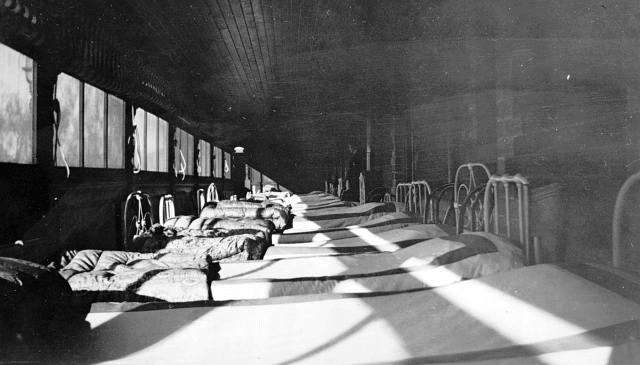
Dormitory of the PLC 'Koorinya' boarding house, c.1875

The PLC Boarding House provides accommodation for 100 girls. Boarders have access to the college's recreational and sporting facilities as well as computers for study needs.

In 2008 PLC opened a new extension to the Boarding House, adding sixty individual bedrooms for senior girls, new bathrooms, three music rooms, a laundry and one computer lab.

== School departments ==
PLC is divided into three school zones:

1. The Early Learning Centre, which educates girls and boys from 6 months to 5 years of age, using the Reggio Emilia approach.
2. The Junior School for girls from Prep to Grade 6.
3. The Senior School, which incorporates Years 7 to 12.

== Curriculum ==
=== Early Learning Centre ===
The Early Learning Centre (ELC) caters for students from 6 months to five years of age. The academic program for three-, four- and five-year-old children is influenced by the Reggio Emilia approach to early childhood education. Students at this stage are introduced to mathematics, language, reading, writing, science, social studies, drama, dance and movement, and Christian Education, through individual and group activities.

The program for children under three years of age is designed to develop basic skills such as independence, listening, communication and sharing. Indoor and outdoor activities are utilised in order to encourage development in cognitive, social, emotional and motor areas.

=== Junior school ===
The Junior School curriculum is based on the Australian Curriculum, and is designed to cater for the different needs of students. Curriculum areas are inter-related, with mastery of the English language seen as a priority. Subjects studied at this stage include Literature, Mathematics, Science, Technology, Studies of Society and Environment, Music, Art, Drama, Religious Education and Physical education. French is introduced at the lower Primary level.

=== Senior school ===
In Years 7 to 10, the school follows a core curriculum determined by the Australian Curriculum Standards. Two languages from a selection of French, Japanese, Indonesian, Latin, German and Chinese are taken during Years 7 and 8. This is dropped to one language from Year 9 onwards, but French can be taken as an elective in addition to another language, if the student so wishes. An elective program is offered to Years 9 and 10, allowing for a wide subject choice, enabling students to study subjects intensively or follow a new field of learning. Students in Year 9 also undertake a semester of a program called Outlook, which involves examining public transport, sustainability, accessibility and charity work. The program culminates in several days of a city program in the Melbourne CBD. In addition to the standard Victorian Certificate of Education the International Baccalaureate is also offered at the school. Furthermore, the school offers a wide range of extracurricular activities including involvement in music concerts such as the annual Gala Night held in August, optional chess tournaments and more. The school offers interschool debating through the Debating Association of Victoria from Years 7 to 12.

== Co-curriculum ==
=== Drama ===
Drama and dance studies are part of the compulsory curriculum in the Early Learning Centre, Junior School and in year 8. It may be chosen as an elective subject in Years 9 and 10. PLC also offers VCE Theatre Studies.

Musical and drama performances are held by the school each year to cater for students with an interest in an instrument, singing, acting, dancing or backstage. PLC also features a number of annual traditions, such as House Concerts and massed choirs and orchestras on stage at Hamer Hall, for the Senior School Speech Night. The Year 9/10 drama and Senior School drama productions are conducted in collaboration with Scotch College.

=== Music ===
Musical instrument instruction is available. Girls sing in assembly three mornings a week.

The music director from 1915 to 1935 was the Bohemian-born pianist Edward Goll, a pupil of Emil von Sauer, grand-pupil of Franz Liszt, and teacher of Australian musicians Margaret Sutherland and Nancy Weir.

=== Outdoor education ===
The sequential Outdoor Education program begins with a Year 3 teddy bears sleep-over, and carries through to the Year 11 Leadership Camp. From Years 4 to 12, there are a wide range of outdoor, adventure, curriculum and special interest camps including art, biology, Christian Convention, The Duke of Edinburgh Award, IB, geography, music, physics, leadership, astronomy, skiing, rowing and surfing.

=== Sport ===
PLC's sporting program includes specialist sports such as sport aerobics, fencing, triathlon, rowing, taekwondo, karate, surf lifesaving, and equestrian. PLC also participates in the full range of sports on offer by Girls' Sport Victoria: athletics, basketball, badminton, cricket, cross country, diving, golf, hockey, netball, soccer, softball, swimming, indoor cricket, tennis, volleyball, and water polo, as well as timetabled physical education classes with a broader focus on skills and fitness.

==== GSV premierships ====
PLC has won the following GSV premierships.

- Badminton (10) – 2001, 2002, 2003, 2005, 2006, 2007, 2009, 2017, 2018, 2019
- Cricket – 2016

=== Chess ===
Chess is offered as an optional after-school activity from Years 3-6 and has a weekly club within the Senior School. Students are often given the opportunity to take part in inter-school tournaments, one of which PLC will host every year. They set and currently hold the record for winning the Australian Schools' Teams Championships (ASTC) most years in a row in their category after winning it in 2016, 2017, 2018, 2019, 2020 and 2021. PLC also holds an annual Chess Championships within the school to find its strongest player, on top of House Chess.

== House system ==
The Junior School and Senior School have separate house systems, with different colours representing each House. The Junior school has four houses:

- Hethersett – Blue
- Koorinya – Silver
- Woollahra – Yellow
- Wyselaskie – Pink

In the Senior School, the houses compete in all areas to gain points in order to win the House Cup at the end of the year. House events include concerts, athletics and swimming. However, small-scale activities range from maths to debating to chess are also included. House colours are awarded through a point system, in which a student is awarded the house colour if she gains a certain number of points for participating in house activities.

The Senior school has six houses, each named after Scottish castles:

- Atholl – Light blue
- Balmoral – White
- Glamis – Green
- Leven – Purple
- Rosslyn – Red
- Stirling – Orange

== Notable alumnae ==
Old Collegians Logo

Alumna Dame Nellie Melba features on the Australian $100 note

Alumnae of Presbyterian Ladies' College, Melbourne are known as "Old Collegians", and automatically become members of the school's alumni association, the PLC Old Collegians' Association (PLCOCA). PLCOCA was formed in 1903 as a way of keeping PLC women in touch with each other and with the college.

In 2001, The Sun-Herald named PLC Melbourne the best girls' school in Australia on the basis of the number of its alumni mentioned in Who's Who in Australia.^{[a]} Among them women were the soprano Helen Mitchell, better known as Nellie Melba; Ethel Florence Lindesay Richardson, the author published as Henry Handel Richardson; Marion Phillips, a Labour politician and the first Australian woman to win a seat in the British parliament, and Vida Goldstein, a suffragette and the first woman to stand for election to the Australian Parliament.

== Notes ==
- Who's Who of Girls' School Rankings, 2001:

1. PLC Melbourne 2. SCEGGS Darlinghurst 3. MLC Melbourne 4. PLC Sydney 5. Melbourne Girls Grammar School 6. Mac.Robertson Girls' High School 7. North Sydney Girls High School 8. Sydney Girls High School 9. MLC Sydney 10. University High School, Melbourne

== See also ==
- List of schools in Victoria
- List of high schools in Victoria
- List of boarding schools in Australia
- List of pipe bands
