= Kokoda Track campaign =

Part of the Pacific War of World War II

Coordinates: 8°52′39.95″S 147°44′14.99″E

- Part of the New Guinea campaign of the Pacific Theater (World War II)
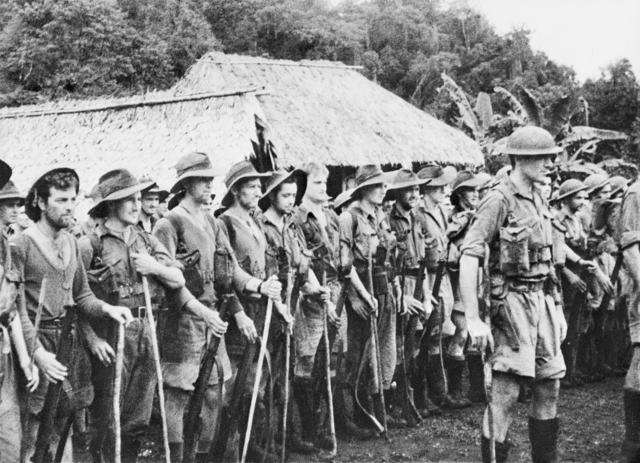
- Soldiers of the Australian 39th Battalion in September 1942
Date	21 July – 16 November 1942
Location	Territory of Papua
Result	Allied victory

Belligerents
Australia; United States	Japan

Commanders and leaders
(United States) Douglas MacArthur (Australia) Basil Morris (Australia) Thomas Blamey (Australia) Sydney Rowell (Australia) Edmund Herring (Australia) Arthur Allen (Australia) George Vasey	(Empire of Japan) Harukichi Hyakutake (Empire of Japan) Tomitarō Horii

Strength
30,000	13,500

Casualties and losses
625 killed 1,055 wounded 4,000+ sick	≈2,050 (Note: Between the initial fighting around Awala and the final battle at Oivi–Gorari.); ~ 4,500 including sick (Note: The figure is based on an estimated strength of 6,000 and a 75% rate. There is some difficulty in disentangling and distinguishing between the fighting that occurred "along the track" and the force that garrisoned Buna–Gona and was engaged in the battle that followed from 16 November 1942 to 22 January 1943. The effective strength at Buna–Gona at the conclusion of the Kokoda Track campaign is generally quoted at about 5,500 but an estimate of 9,000 represents the total strength, including labour units, non-combat forces, sick and injured. This is based on the interrogation of Lieutenant General Hatazō Adachi at the end of the war. Adachi commanded the 18th Army, of which the Buna–Gona garrison was part.)

The Kokoda Track campaign or Kokoda Trail campaign was part of the Pacific War of World War II. The campaign consisted of a series of battles fought between July and November 1942 in what was then the Australian Territory of Papua. It was primarily a land battle, between the Japanese South Seas Detachment under Major General Tomitarō Horii and Australian and Papuan land forces under command of New Guinea Force. The Japanese objective was to seize Port Moresby by an overland advance from the north coast, following the Kokoda Track over the mountains of the Owen Stanley Range, as part of a strategy to isolate Australia from the United States.

Japanese forces landed and established beachheads near Gona and Buna on 21 July 1942. Opposed by Maroubra Force, then consisting of four platoons of the 39th Battalion and elements of the Papuan Infantry Battalion, they quickly advanced and captured Kokoda and its strategically vital airfield on 29 July. Despite reinforcement, the Australian forces were continually pushed back. The veteran Second Australian Imperial Force (AIF) 21st Brigade narrowly avoided capture in the Battle of Mission Ridge – Brigade Hill from 6 to 8 September. In the Battle of Ioribaiwa from 13 to 16 September, the 25th Brigade under Brigadier Kenneth Eather fought the Japanese to a halt but ceded the field to the Japanese, withdrawing to Imita Ridge.

The Japanese advanced to within sight of Port Moresby but withdrew on 26 September. They had outrun their supply line and had been ordered to withdraw in consequence of reverses suffered at Guadalcanal. The Australian pursuit encountered strong opposition from well-prepared positions around Templeton's Crossing and Eora Village from 11 to 28 October. Following the unopposed recapture of Kokoda, a major battle was fought around Oivi and Gorari from 4 to 11 November, resulting in a victory for the Australians. By 16 November, two brigades of the Australian 7th Division had crossed the Kumusi River at Wairopi, and advanced on the Japanese beachheads in a joint Australian and United States operation. The Japanese forces at Buna–Gona held out until 22 January 1943.

Australian reinforcement was hampered by the logistical problems of supporting a force in isolated, mountainous, jungle terrain. There were few planes available for aerial resupply, and techniques for it were still primitive. Australian command considered that the Vickers machine gun and medium mortars were too heavy to carry and would be ineffective in the jungle terrain. Without artillery, mortars or medium machine guns, the Australians faced an opponent equipped with mountain guns and light howitzers that had been carried into the mountains and proved to be a decisive advantage. Australian forces were unprepared to conduct a campaign in the jungle environment of New Guinea. The lessons learned during the course of this campaign and the subsequent battle of Buna–Gona led to widespread changes in doctrine, training, equipment and structure, with a legacy that remains until the present day.

In consequence of the rapid Japanese advance and the perceived failure to quickly counterattack, a "crisis of command" resulted, in which manoeuvring by General Douglas MacArthur, Supreme Commander of Allied Forces in the South West Pacific Area, and General Sir Thomas Blamey, commander of Allied Land Forces, resulted in the sackings of three high-ranking Australian officers. The generalship of MacArthur and Blamey has been criticised for unreasonable and unrealistic perceptions of the terrain and conditions under which the campaign was fought—to the detriment of the troops committed to the fighting. The Kokoda Track campaign has been mythologised as Australia's Thermopylae and incorporated into the Anzac legend even though the premise of a vastly numerically superior enemy has since been shown to be incorrect.

== Background ==
=== Strategic context ===
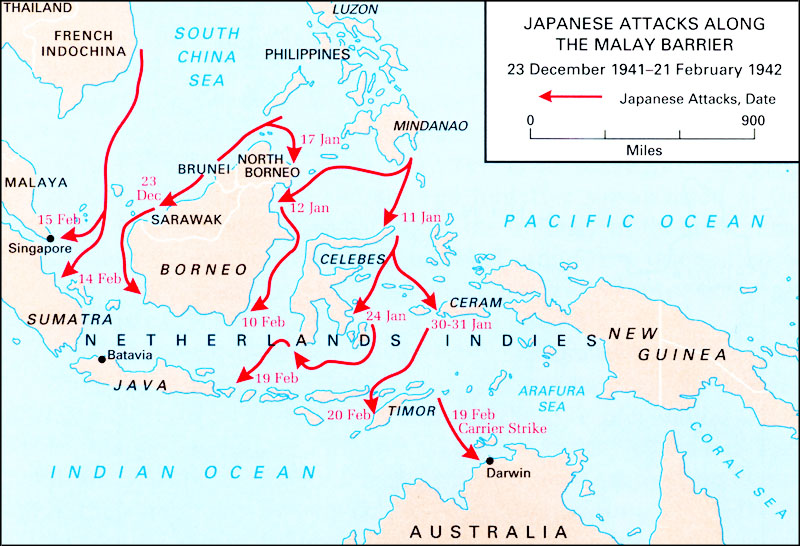
Japanese attacks along the Malay Barrier 23 December 1941 – 21 February 1942.

After the fall of Singapore, the Australian government and many Australians feared that Japan would invade the Australian mainland. Australia was ill-prepared to counter such an attack. The entire 8th Division, deployed to Malaya, Ambon, Timor and Rabaul, was lost or rendered ineffective as the Japanese rapidly advanced. The Royal Australian Air Force (RAAF) lacked modern aircraft and the Royal Australian Navy (RAN) was too small to counter the Imperial Japanese Navy. The RAAF and RAN were greatly expanded, though it took years for these services to build up to their peak strengths. The Militia was mobilised but, although a large force, it was inexperienced and lacked modern equipment. In response to the threat, the Government appealed to the United States for assistance, and the 6th and 7th Divisions of the Second Australian Imperial Force (2nd AIF) were brought back from the Middle East. British Prime Minister Winston Churchill attempted to divert them to Burma, but the Australian Prime Minister, John Curtin, refused to authorise this movement. As a compromise, two brigades of the 6th Division disembarked at Ceylon, where they formed part of the garrison until they returned to Australia in August 1942.

The Japanese Imperial General Headquarters considered invading Australia in early 1942 but decided against doing so in February that year, as it was judged to be beyond the Japanese capabilities, and no planning or preparations were undertaken. Instead, in March 1942 the Japanese military adopted a strategy of isolating Australia from the United States and preventing Allied offensive operations by capturing Port Moresby, the Solomon Islands, Fiji, Samoa and New Caledonia. An attempt to capture Port Moresby by an amphibious assault, Operation Mo, was thwarted by the Battle of the Coral Sea in May 1942. A month later, most of the Japanese carrier fleet was destroyed in the Battle of Midway, further reducing the possibility of major amphibious operations in the South Pacific. Following this, the Japanese began to consider an overland advance on Port Moresby.

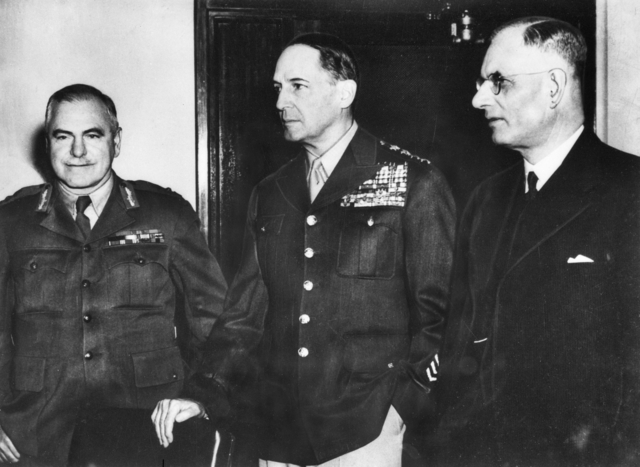
General Douglas MacArthur (centre) with General Sir Thomas Blamey (left) and Prime Minister John Curtin (right) in March 1942

Meanwhile, the Allied Supreme Commander in the South West Pacific Area, General Douglas MacArthur set about developing airfields for the defence of Port Moresby, and to strike against the Japanese. The first of these, Operation Boston, was authorised on 20 May and initially planned for the Abau–Mullins Harbor area. Milne Bay was subsequently determined to be preferable and a garrison force was sent by ship from Port Moresby on 22 June. Another strip at Merauke, on the south coast of Dutch New Guinea was authorised on 22 June to protect the western flank. On 9 June, MacArthur questioned General Sir Thomas Blamey, the commander of Allied Land Forces, as to measures taken for the defence of the overland approach from Buna. This set in train the deployment of forces to Kokoda. MacArthur began to consider the development of an airfield in the Buna area. An initial reconnaissance, landed by flying boat, was conducted on 10 and 11 July. Orders for the airfield construction, Operation Providence, were received by New Guinea Force (NGF) on 17 July, but were postponed by seven days on 18 July, and cancelled following the Japanese landings that shortly followed.

=== Geography ===
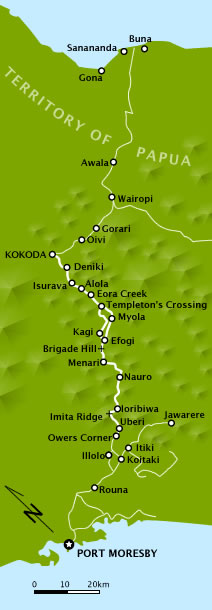
A map depicting locations along the Kokoda Track

In 1942, Papua was a territory of Australia. There had been little development and it was largely devoid of infrastructure beyond that around Port Moresby. The pre-war economy was based primarily upon copra and rubber—with plantations established intermittently in coastal regions—and mining. The administrative centre of Port Moresby had basic airfield and port facilities. There were no roads beyond the vicinity of Port Moresby and, by modern standards, these were little more than tracks. As a result, travel north of Port Moresby was largely undertaken by air, or sea. There were a few landing fields around Port Moresby, with others on the northern side of the Owen Stanley Range at the government stations of Buna and Kokoda. (Note: Milner refers to the strip at Buna as being "small and neglected".)

The village of Kokoda is positioned on a plateau in the northern foot-hills of the Owen Stanley Range. It overlooks the Yodda Valley (formed by the Mambare River) to its north. The Mambare runs roughly south-east to north-west. Kokoda is approximately 100-kilometre (62 mi) direct line from the coastal village of Buna, which formed part of the Japanese beachhead positions occupied on their landing. However, the overland route was approximately 160 kilometres (100 mi). The track to the coast crosses the Kumusi River at Wairopi, approximately 25 kilometres (16 mi) east of Kokoda. The river was spanned there by a wire-rope bridge (Wairopi being pidgin for wire rope). There was a wide track leading from there to the coast which the Japanese subsequently set about developing as a road for vehicle traffic. (Note: After the initial landing, it was quickly made trafficable for 60 kilometres (35 mi) from the coast to Sonbo.)

In 1942, the village was the site of a government station, rubber plantation and strategically important airstrip. The Kokoda Track is a foot track that runs roughly southwest from Kokoda 96 kilometres (60 mi) overland (60 kilometres (37 mi) in a straight line) through the Owen Stanley Range towards Port Moresby. It was known before the war and had been used as an overland mail route. While there is a "main track" that is associated with the fighting during the campaign, there are many parallel, interlocking tracks that follow much the same general course. The southern end of the track is now considered to start at Owers' Corner, 61 kilometres (38 mi) from Port Moresby. The vehicle track from Port Moresby originally terminated at McDonald's [Corner], where it serviced the McDonald homestead. Between June and late September 1942, around 11 kilometres (7 mi) of road was completed, extending it to Owers' Corner.

The Kokoda Track passed through what was referred to during the early war years as "the (Kokoda) Gap". To the Japanese, who had learned of the Gap through vague explorer's accounts, it potentially offered a corridor from Buna through the Owen Stanleys along which they could launch a quick advance on Port Moresby. Conversely, the Allies believed it was a narrow and largely impassable path that could be blocked and held with only limited resources. In reality, the Gap is a dip in the Owen Stanley Range about 11 kilometres (7 mi) wide, convenient for aircraft crossing the range to pass through.

The track reaches a height of 2,190 metres (7,185 ft) as it passes around the peak of Mount Bellamy. The terrain rises and falls with regularity, up to 5,000 metres (16,000 ft) up and down over the full length of the track. (Note: The Kokoda Track Commemorative web site and James give a cross-section of the track.) This markedly increases the distance to be traversed, although there are several flat areas, particularly around Myola. The vegetation is largely dense jungle. The climate is mostly hot and humid with high rainfall, although the higher parts are cold, particularly at night. The higher elevations are frequently above cloud level, resulting in fog.

Myola is close to the watershed. A stream flowing from Myola is part of the headwaters of Eora Creek on the northern watershed. On the northern part of the track, its course, to Deniki, is determined by Eora Creek. It follows along the side of the steep valley formed by the creek. It crosses the creek from one side to the other at several points along its course. From Deniki, the track descends to the Kokoda plateau.

=== Disease ===
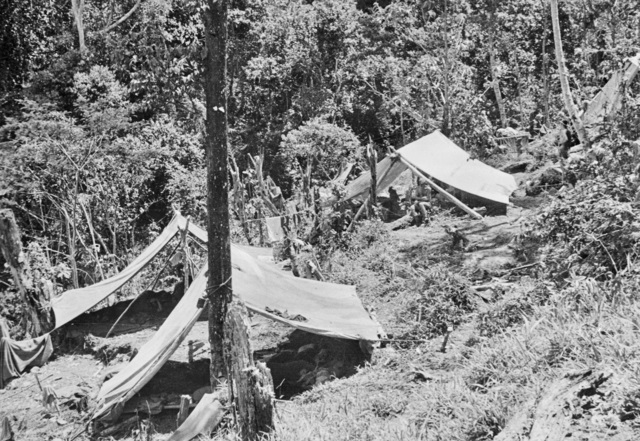
Tents of the 2/4th Field Ambulance near Efogi (AWM P02423.011)

Operations in New Guinea were impacted by tropical diseases such as malaria, dengue fever, scrub typhus, tropical ulcers, dysentery from a range of causes and fungal infections. Walker observes that the Kokoda Track "starts and ends with malaria". Malarial vectors were substantially absent from the cooler, higher elevations along the track. Most cases observed in these areas were relapses rather than primary infections. The immediate vicinity of Port Moresby is relatively dry. While this tends to mitigate the risk of malaria, significant rates of the disease were observed in troops, mainly militia, sent to New Guinea for defence of the port, leading up to the campaign. The risk from malaria was particularly high for troops operating in the coastal area around the southern end of the track and when the Australian forces had been forced back to Imita Ridge. AIF units returning from the Middle East were more aware of the threat this disease posed and arrived with supplies of quinine. For these reasons, the disease did not have the same degree of significance or impact on operations as it did at Milne Bay or the subsequent operations at Buna–Gona.

Anderson recounts the prevalence of dysentery among Australian troops, while James reports that "more and more [Japanese] succumbed" to diseases, including dysentery, as they withdrew along the track. Walker attributes enteric infections to poor field hygiene, contaminated and unpurified water, and a failure to make adequate sanitary provisions along the track during the early part of the campaign. He also identifies that a proportion of diarrhoeal disturbances were attributable to the poor diet (particularly the high-fat content of tinned beef) rather than infection.

=== Japanese forces ===
The Japanese 17th Army under Lieutenant General Harukichi Hyakutake was a corps-sized command, based at Rabaul, involved in the New Guinea, Guadalcanal, and Solomon Islands campaigns. Following Coral Sea, the 17th Army considered an overland advance on Port Moresby. This was based on pre-war intelligence that a road existed linking it with Kokoda. Initial aerial reconnaissance was inconclusive but plans were made for a reconnaissance in force and to exploit the possibility of an advance along such a route. The 15th Independent Engineer Regiment (less one company) and the South Seas Detachment under Major General Tomitarō Horii were assigned to these tasks. At the time, Horii was unenthusiastic as to the possibility of success, in consideration of the logistical difficulties that would be faced, but he did not press his objection.

An advance party, under command of Colonel Yokoyama Yosuke of the 15th Independent Engineer Regiment was to consist of the main force of the regiment, the 1st Battalion of the 144th Infantry Regiment, and the 1st Company, 1st Battalion of the 55th Mountain Artillery Regiment. It also included 500 Korean and Formosan labourers and 2,000 native labourers from Rabaul. A naval force based on the 5th Yokosuka Naval Landing Party was to land at the same time as the advance party and commence construction of an airfield at Buna. Japanese planning proceeded on the premise that an overland assault would occur.

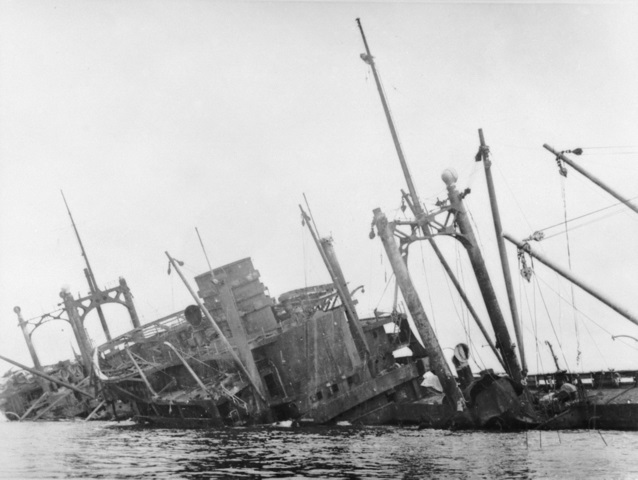
The wreck of Ayotosan Maru, a transport which was sunk during the initial landing shortly after disembarkation (AWM014868)

The initial landing took place from the evening of 21 July 1942. An infantry company was immediately dispatched towards Kokoda. A second component of the Yokoyama landing party arrived on 29 July. The landing was reinforced by successive convoys over the following weeks. The main force of the 144th Infantry Regiment landed on 18 August. The 41st Infantry Regiment (less 1st Battalion) landed on 21 August, with the 1st Battalion landing on 27 August.

Horii linked up with the advance party at Kokoda and began to assemble his force for the overland advance. By 26 August, it consisted of the 144th Infantry Regiment (three battalions), the 41st Infantry Regiment (2nd and 3rd Battalions, with the 1st Battalion yet to arrive—joining the main force on 14 September) and 1st Battalion, 55th Mountain Artillery Regiment. The 3rd Battalion was tasked with protecting the force's line-of-communication. The 41st Infantry Regiment fielded only 1,900 troops since both the 1st and 3rd Battalions had approximately 400 detached from each for road construction and supply tasks. The force has been estimated at 6,000. Horii commenced his advance with each man carrying sixteen days' rations. Troops of both regiments were seasoned veterans. The 41st Infantry Regiment had fought against Australians in Malaya.

=== Australian forces ===
The Australian territories of Papua and New Guinea formed the 8th Military District of Australia (subsequently designated New Guinea Force) under command of Brigadier Basil Morris. As war in the Pacific approached, there were two local militia units: the Papuan Infantry Battalion (PIB) and the New Guinea Volunteer Rifles. With growing tensions, the 49th Battalion was sent to Port Moresby in March 1941. On 3 January 1942, the 49th Battalion was joined by the 39th and 53rd Battalions under command of the 30th Brigade.

At the end of May, the force protecting Port Moresby was increased by the 14th Brigade, consisting of the 3rd, 36th and 55th Battalions. The militia units were considered poorly trained, though some effort was taken to infuse them with experienced junior officers, (Note: The 53rd Battalion received a significantly smaller proportion of these.) most of their time in New Guinea was spent labouring rather than training. Morale in the 53rd Battalion was particularly low. A draft, numbering about one hundred, was drawn from other militia units on short notice. With embarkation in late December, they were denied Christmas leave. Destined for North Queensland they were diverted to New Guinea en route. The disaffection undermined morale and has been cited as a significant factor in respect of the battalion's subsequent performance.

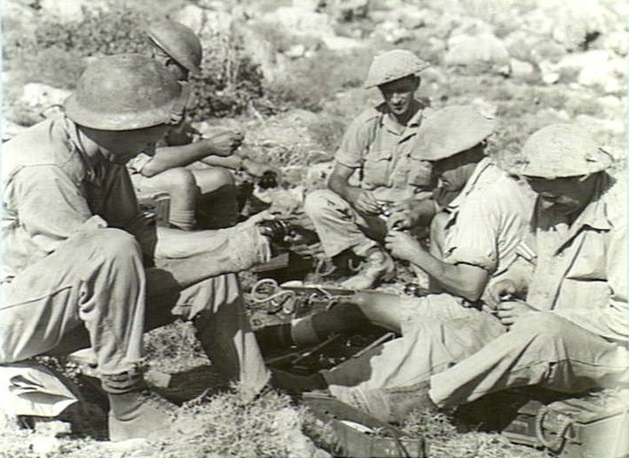
Soldiers of the 2/16th Battalion, 7th Division, fuzing Mills bombs, Damour, during the Syria–Lebanon Campaign. The division had also seen service in North Africa before being recalled to Australia. (AWM008641)

As well as defending Port Moresby, New Guinea Force commanded operations against the Japanese landings around Wau, that occurred on 8 March 1942, and was commencing development of an air base at Milne Bay. The 7th Division of the 2nd AIF was poised to deploy to New Guinea—its 21st and 25th Brigades would be assigned to the defence of Port Moresby, while its 18th Brigade would be sent to Milne Bay.

On 12 June 1942, Morris ordered the PIB to patrol a wide area of the north coast around: Ioma, located approximately 60 kilometres (35 mi) north-northeast of Kokoda; Awala, between Kokoda and Gona; and, Tufi, on Cape Nelson – with headquarters at Kokoda. The battalion, commanded by Major William Watson, consisted of three companies with a total strength of 310, including 30 Europeans – mainly officers and senior non-commissioned officers. Its role was reconnaissance. (Note: The strength here is from McCarthy. The operational instruction gives a strength of 20 "white officers" and 280 "native" other ranks.) There were indications of Japanese plans to land in the vicinity of Buna. On 22 June Morris received orders from LHQ to deploy "Australian infantry" to Kokoda for the forward defence of Port Moresby. (Note: Some authors have stated that the order was to deploy "white troops" and indeed, this is what is recorded in the NGF War Diary, however; the signal from LHQ required the deployment of "Australian infantry".)

About the middle of July, GHQ was planning Operation Providence for development of an airstrip in the vicinity of Buna. When orders were issued to Morris for the Providence operation on 17 July, he intended to use the 39th Battalion as the force required under the plan to garrison the Buna area. The initial deployment of the 39th Battalion had an entirely different aim though. Author, Eustace Keogh, clarifies this:

On 15 July General MacArthur issued orders for the first forward in this area [meaning Buna-Gona]. These orders directed that a small force of Australian infantry and American engineers should march across the Kokoda Trail to Buna where they would be joined by another party moving by sea. The object was to construct an airfield at Dobodura. Actually, the overland part of this movement had already begun, though it had an entirely different aim. On 20 June General Blamey...had ordered Morris to take steps to secure the Kokoda area and its airstrip...Preceded by the PIB, the leading company of the 39th was to leave Illolo on 26 June. Actually the company did not leave that point until 7 July.

On 23 June, an initial order was given for a company of the 39th Battalion to deploy to Kokoda with the possibility of it being joined by the rest of the battalion. This was amended on 24 June for deployment of the battalion (less one company). The instrument for this was NGF Operational Instruction 18. It placed the PIB under command of the 39th Battalion. It also assigned detachments of service units in support. Attachments were placed under command of Lieutenant Colonel William Owen, commanding officer of the 39th Battalion. "Maroubra" was assigned as the code word. An advance party, the battalion's B Company under Captain Sam Templeton, assembled at Illolo. Departing on Uberi 8 July, (Note: James refers to a "Uberi–Kokoda track report" of about July 1942, indicating that at the time, the start of the Kokoda track was considered to be Uberi.) it arrived at Kokoda on 14 July. (Note: Anderson 2014, p. 25 reports that B Company of the 39th Battalion arrived at Kokoda on 14 July 1942. Some other sources (particularly McCarthy 1959, p. 117 and Brune 2003, p. 98) may report the arrival as 15 July. The company's arrival on 14 July can be confirmed against the war diaries of the 39th Battalion and the 30th Brigade.)

As a code word, "Maroubra" continued to be used throughout the campaign to refer to operations along the track and the Australian forces deployed forward—even though references to "Maroubra Force" in sources is somewhat enigmatic. (Note: Anderson 2014 uses "Maroubra Force" throughout for the forces fighting along the track. Situation reports issued by NGF Headquarters continued to identify the 7th Division as "Maroubra" until 17 November, effectively, the end of the Kokoda campaign and commencement of operations for the advance toward the beachheads at Buna and Gona. For further details, see main article – Maroubra Force.)

The Japanese landings around Buna and Gona saw B Company of the 39th Battalion in position at Kokoda and C Company advancing along the track, departing Illolo on 23 July. The remainder of the battalion was poised to move and most of the battalion had arrived at Deniki by 4 August.

== Campaign ==
=== Overview ===
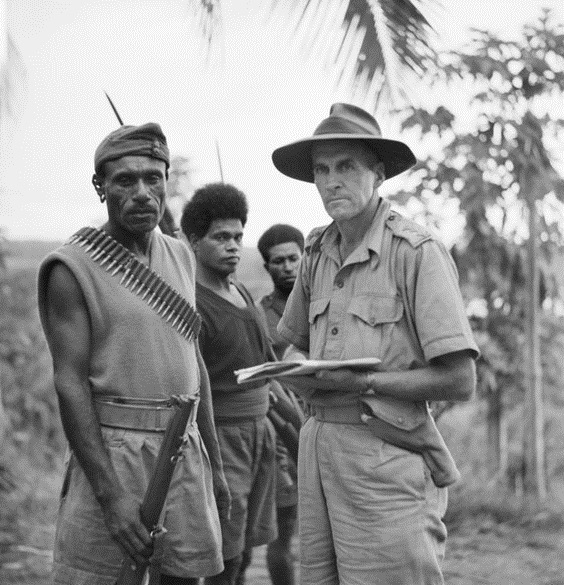
Captain Thomas Grahamslaw of the ANGAU and Sergeant-Major Katue of the PIB, October 1942. Grahamslaw was at Buna when the Japanese landed. (AWM127566)

In the early evening of 21 July 1942, Japanese troops landed close to Gona. The Japanese advance party moved rapidly towards Kokoda, reaching the Kumusi, at Wairopi in the afternoon of 23 July. The PIB and Australians engaged the advancing Japanese with ambushes. B Company, 39th Battalion assembled a force (including what remained of the PIB) to make a stand near Oivi on 26 July. One platoon remained at Kokoda. Threatened with encirclement, the force at Oivi withdrew south to Deniki. Having lost contact, the platoon at Kokoda also withdrew to Deniki on 27 July. With the force reassembled, it reoccupied the village unopposed on 28 July. The first battle at Kokoda was fought over 28–29 July. Repeated, determined attacks caused the Australians to withdraw to Deniki. Owen, commanding officer of the 39th Battalion, was mortally wounded in the fighting.

There was a pause in the Japanese advance. Remaining companies of the 39th Battalion arrived overland and Major Allan Cameron, Brigade Major of the 30th Brigade was appointed to assume command of the force. He planned an attack for 8 August towards Kokoda, with three companies advancing on different lines. Two of the companies were held up and forced to retire. A Company was able to occupy Kokoda but, isolated and under attack, it withdrew during the night of 9 August. Companies of the 39th Battalion had withdrawn to Deniki by 12 August and were attacked the following morning. With the threat of envelopment, the battalion commenced to withdraw towards Isurava on the morning of 14 August.

Meanwhile, the 53rd Battalion and headquarters 30th Brigade under Brigadier Selwyn Porter were sent as reinforcements. Two battalions of the 2nd AIF's 21st Brigade under Brigadier Arnold Potts were following. A defensive position was established by Porter at Isurava with the 30th Brigade to be relieved by the 21st Brigade force. As Potts' lead battalion approached, he took command of the combined force to effect the relief. However, the Japanese advance overtook events and, from 26 to 31 August, a battle ensued in which four Japanese battalions were committed. The 53rd Battalion failed to secure the eastern flank and, with the Japanese taking a commanding position to the Australian front, ultimately forced an Australian withdrawal. The 21st Brigade then fought a series of engagements between 31 August and 5 September as it withdrew from Eora Village to Templeton's Crossing.

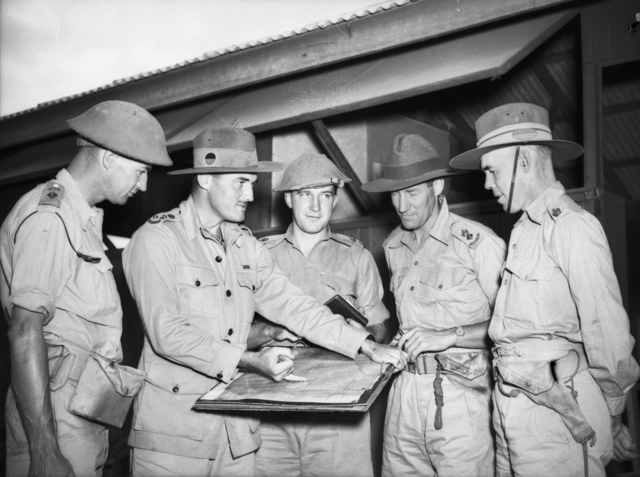
Officers of 30th Brigade, July 1942. Left to right, Lieutenant Colonel Owen Kessels 49th Battalion, Brigadier Selwyn Porter, Major Norman Fleay commanding Kanga Force, Lieutenant Colonel William Owen, 39th Battalion and his second in command, Major J. Findlay. (AWM 025958)

The Japanese had landed at Milne Bay on 25 August but, as the Australian position there firmed, the third battalion of Potts' 21st Brigade was released to join the fighting along the track. With this reinforcement, he determined to make a stand on Mission Ridge, running forward from Brigade Hill. In fighting from 6 to 9 September, two battalions of the brigade withdrew, narrowly avoiding encirclement while the 2/27th Battalion was feared lost until its remnants emerged from the jungle three weeks later.

Following the battle, Potts was recalled to Port Moresby, with Porter being placed in command. The depleted 21st Brigade was withdrawn to Ioribaiwa Ridge. It was reinforced by the 3rd Battalion and awaited relief by the 25th Brigade, under command of Eather. Eather took command of the combined force but the Japanese attacked just as his battalions were taking up position—with fighting over the period 14 to 16 September. He obtained permission to withdraw and consolidate at Imita Ridge—the final defensive position along the Track. Meanwhile, American forces had landed at Guadalcanal on 7 August. Unable to support both operations, Horii was ordered to withdraw. When Eather attacked the Japanese positions on 28 September, he found them abandoned. The Australian forces cautiously pursued the Japanese withdrawal. The 16th Brigade was committed to the advance and direct command passed to the 7th Division, under Major General Arthur "Tubby" Allen.

The 25th Brigade took the vanguard. On 10 October, Myola was occupied unopposed and contact was made with the Japanese defence. The 25th Brigade was held up at Templeton's Crossing from 16 October until the 16th Brigade pushed through on 20 October and advanced towards Eora Village. Here, the advance was held until the Japanese forces withdrew on 28 October. Pressured to hasten the advance by MacArthur, Allan was replaced by Major General George Vasey on 28 October. The 7th Division advanced towards Kokoda and, when a patrol reported it unoccupied, it was retaken on 2 November.

A further battle was fought around Oivi and Gorari from 4 to 11 November. Vasey was able to turn the flank and rout the Japanese. On 15 November, the 7th Division crossed the Kumusi River and commenced its advance towards the beachheads at Buna–Gona.

=== Reasons for Japanese withdrawal ===
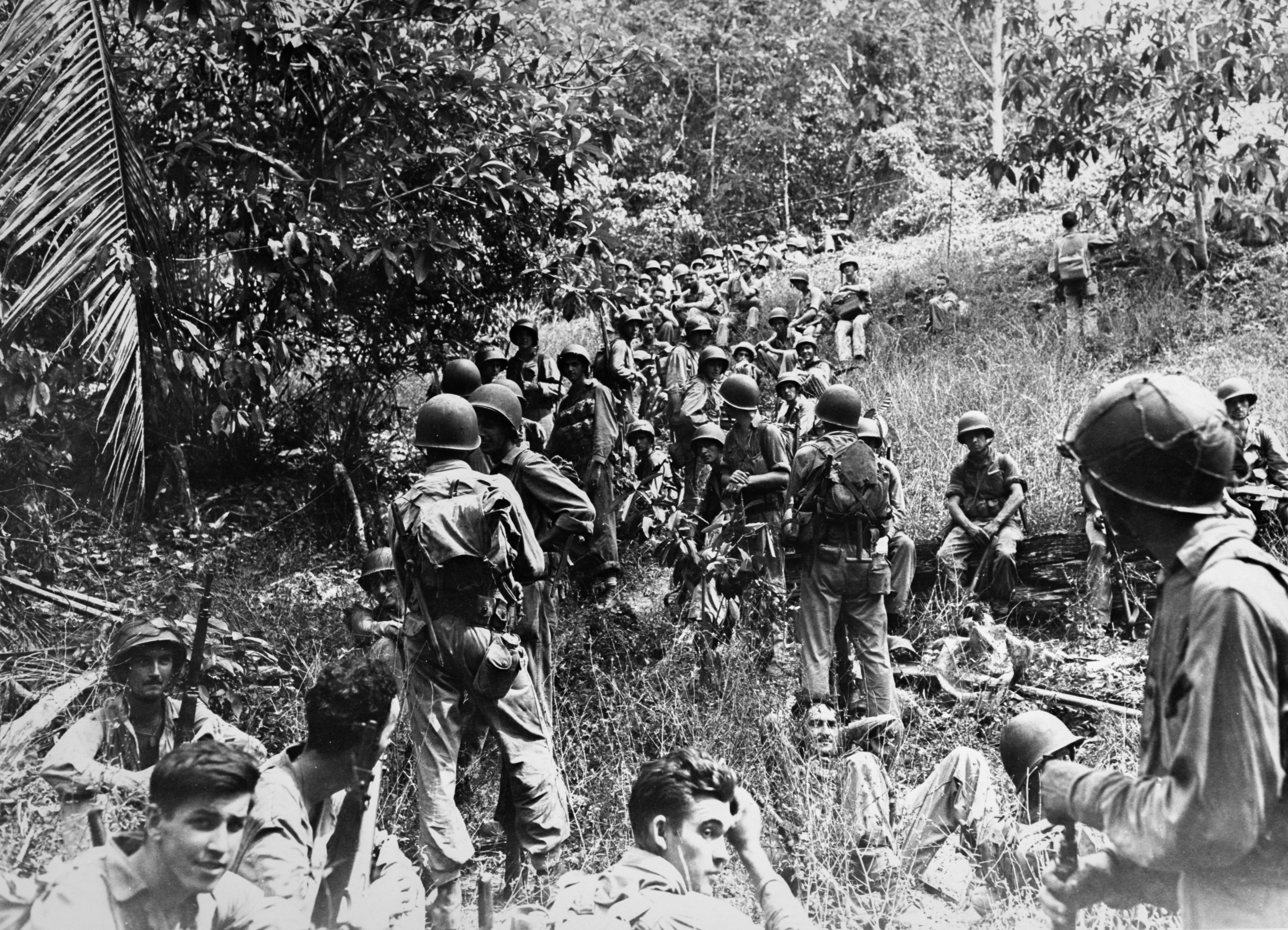
US Marines at Guadalcanal

As the Kokoda Track campaign was taking place, a Japanese invasion force made up of Japanese Special Naval Landing Force units attempted to capture the strategically valuable Milne Bay area on the eastern tip of New Guinea in August 1942. The Battle of Milne Bay, fought from 25 August to 7 September 1942, resulted in a Japanese defeat. This was the first notable Japanese land defeat and raised Allied morale across the Pacific Theatre.

Allied forces identified a Japanese airfield under construction at Guadalcanal, and 19,000 US Marines were embarked to capture the airfield. An amphibious landing was made on 7 August. The battle lasted until 9 February 1943 and was strongly contested, on land, at sea and in the air. Hyakutake's initial thrust on 14 September to re-take the island's Henderson Field was defeated. In an unequal battle, Major General Kiyotake Kawaguchi's forces lost about 850 killed, while the American Marines lost 104. When the news reached Imperial General Headquarters in Japan, they decided in an emergency session that they could not support fronts in both New Guinea and at Guadalcanal. Hyakutake decided that he only had sufficient troops and material to defeat the Allied forces on Guadalcanal. He prepared to send more troops to Guadalcanal in another attempt to recapture the airfield. With the concurrence of the Japanese command staff, he ordered Horii to withdraw his troops on the Kokoda Track until the issue at Guadalcanal was decided. The Japanese troops were, after several weeks of exhausting fighting and heavy losses, at Ioribaiwa, within 32 kilometres (20 mi) of Port Moresby. There were also concerns that Allied forces might land at Buna at any time.

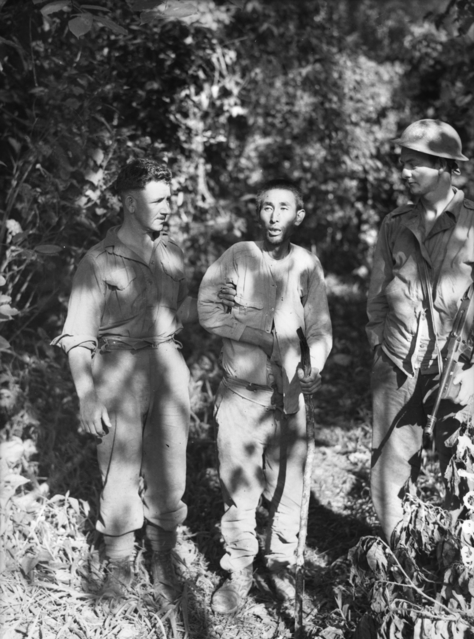
An emaciated Japanese prisoner captured near Menari as the Australians advanced (AWM027085)

Bullard, in the introduction to his translation observes:

... numerous orders and instructions had been issued to commander Horii from the 17th Army and Army General Staff in Tokyo from late August to halt the southward advance of the South Seas Force. These orders, however, were ignored until late September when the withdrawal actually began. Further, several factors were raised for the decision to withdraw—the threat of Allied landings at Buna, the supply situation, and the failure of the Kawaguchi Detachment to retake Guadalcanal.

These instructions to halt the advance appear to date from as early as 16 August: "Senior Japanese officers interviewed after the war thought that the factor most influencing the postponement was not Guadalcanal but rather 'stronger than anticipated Australian resistance at Kokoda.'"

Bullard reports orders to Horii of 28 August, "[to] advance to the southern slopes of the Owen Stanley Range ... but amass your main strength on the north side of the range in preparation for future operations". Bullard notes a degree of ambiguity with respect to defining the "southern slopes". On 8 September, the 17th Army ordered Horii to assemble the 41st Regiment in the Kokoda area. Horii did draw back the main body of his force but continued to thrust forward. When, on 19 September, Hyakutake became aware that Ioribaiwa had been occupied on 16 September, he "issued strict orders for front-line troops to immediately occupy a position to the north of Mawai". (Note: Haruki Yoshida 2017, p. 209 identifies Mawai as near Nauro.) An order of 23 September was to secure the Isurava–Kokoda area as "a base for future operations". (Note: Bullard reports that radio communication with Rabaul was based at Kokoda and that there was a lag in the order of three days each way in communications between the 17th Army headquarters and Horii's forward headquarters. Bullard cites the message of 19 September but does not quote the contents. He does quote the subsequent order of 23 September.) Horii had out-run his supply line and therefore his force was faced with extreme rationing and was unable to advance any further. On 24 September, the 2nd/144th Battalion withdrew from Ioribaiwa. The 3rd/144th Battalion formed the rearguard and withdrew during the night of 26 September.

=== Logistics ===
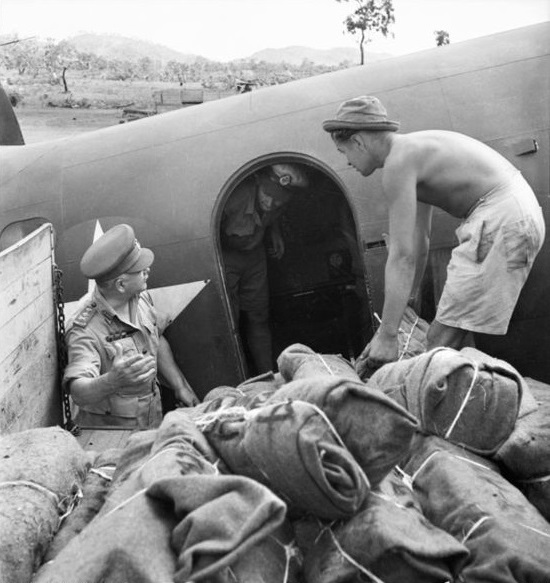
Troops load ammunition wrapped in blankets to be airdropped. Blamey displays a keen interest AWM013836

==== Allied logistics ====
This campaign and the battle that followed at the Japanese beachheads around Buna and Gona were defined, for both sides, by the limitations imposed by terrain and the capability to supply and maintain their forces under the conditions they faced. Morris said to Lieutenant General Sydney Rowell on handing over command of NGF, "The mountains will beat the Nips and we must be careful they don't beat us."

Substantially devoid of infrastructure, Morris had set about an ongoing programme to expand, improve and develop harbour and airfield facilities at Port Moresby. Opened in early October, a T-shaped wharf was constructed on Tatana Island. It more than doubled the capacity of the port. Under orders from GHQ, an airfield and subsequent port facilities were developed at Milne Bay. This saw Allied forces fortuitously placed to counter the Japanese landing that occurred there. Roads were virtually non-existent. In concert with orders to deploy Maroubra Force to Kokoda, Lieutenant Bert Kienzle was ordered to construct an overland road for its resupply. Historian Peter Brune describes it as "one of the most ludicrous" orders ever given. Just over 11 kilometres (6.8 mi) of road was completed by the end of September 1942, from McDonald's to Owers' Corner.

Kienzle guided Templeton's B Company of the 39th Battalion across the track to Kokoda. As they went, Kienzle identified staging points along the track and made arrangements for provisioning them. When they arrived at Kokoda, food was running low. Kienzle made a brief visit to his homestead in the Yodda Valley and returned with supplies. The trek was considered too arduous for the soldiers to carry any heavy equipment. Arrangements had been made for a coastal vessel to transport supplies and other equipment to Buna. It was unloaded the day prior to the Japanese commencing their landings at Basabua, northward around the coast, near Gona. (Note: The vessel having arrived on 19 July.) While Kokoda was held, it was possible to resupply by air landing. Owen flew into Kokoda to take command on 24 July. On 26 July, a platoon of D Company was landed. Lacking serviceable aircraft, this was done in two lifts by a single plane. (Note: Anderson 2014, p. 31 reports that the reinforcement was made by a single plane in two flights; however, Kelly 2003, p. 354 identifies it was flown by two different planes of different types and is able to identify them by type. Moremon 2000, pp. 130–131 reports that there were only two transports at Port Moresby at the time, having just arrived from Australia, and one of these was declared unserviceable on arrival with engine problems. Anderson reports the flight time to Kododa as 20 minutes with there being 90 minutes between each fight landing at Kokoda.)

Having returned overland, Kienzle made a report on the supply situation. A porter could carry a load equivalent to 13 days' rations. If he carried rations for a soldier, between them, they would consume the load in 6½ days. This made no allowance for ammunition, other necessary equipment or the porter's return. The trek to Kokoda was 8 days. He concluded that operations could not be sustained without large scale air drops occurring. Aerial resupply commenced with drop sites at Kagi and Efogi but neither site was particularly suitable. Significant quantities fell outside the drop zone and could not be recovered. Unreliable maps or poor visibility in the drop zone meant that supplies were often misdropped. Recognising that a better drop zone was needed, Kienzle set out on 1 August, to find a large open area he recalled having seen from the air. On 3 August, he identified the smaller of two dry lake beds near the crest of the range, which he called Myola. Kienzle immediately requested that dropping begin at Myola. Access to this large area alleviated the proportion of supplies lost to the jungle. It also made the task of carriers achievable. He set about establishing it as a supply camp and cut a new track towards Eora Creek. It joined the existing track at Templeton's Crossing, which he also named.

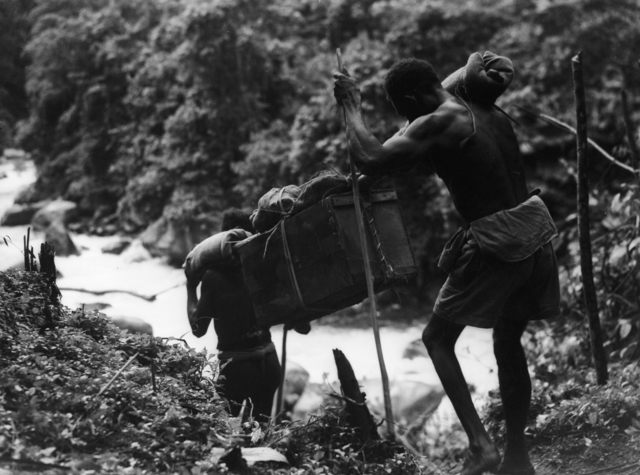
Papuan carriers with a two-man load, moving along the track (AWM013002)

While the discovery of Myola alleviated one of the problems associated with resupply, it did not solve them all. Air drops requested during the second battle at Kokoda were delayed by weather—which frequently interfered with air operations over the range. At the start of the campaign, effective air dropping techniques had not been developed. Belated drops to Kokoda were made by fighters because of the lack of transports. Belly tanks were filled with supplies but this could not be widely used. Parachutes were not initially available and, after a quantity were delivered in mid-September, remained in short supply and were reserved for essential equipment. (Note: A requisition to the US was made on 21 July for 5,000 parachutes and containers. An initial delivery of 1,000 parachutes (less containers) was sent by plane on 22 September, with the remainder, sent by ship.) Most supplies were "free dropped". Packaging was primitive by modern standards. Supplies were wrapped in blankets or tied in sacks. There was, however, a conscious choice to utilise packing, such as blankets, that were required by the troops and might otherwise have been supplied separately. (Note: Moremon 2000, pp. 180–181 reports that this was not initially adopted (until perhaps the latter part of August) and, had it been, it would have saved a great deal of manpower, with many thousands of blankets having been carried overland.) The rate of breakage and loss was high—on average, 50 per cent and up to 90 per cent. (Note: McCarthy gives an account of the progress that had been made and the methods employed as the Australians advanced in early to mid–October.) Lieutenant Fayle, Allen's aide-de-camp, commented that: "The whole fact of the matter, and NGF seemed unable to understand all through the campaign, was that recoveries were never 100 per cent of the supplies dropped and wastage was at times terrific."

The lack of transport aircraft was another constraint. On 5 August, the only two aircraft available for supply work returned to Australia. On 17 August, a Japanese air raid on Port Moresby destroyed five aircraft and severely damaged eleven others when the aircraft had been parked close together. Of these, seven transports (later dubbed "biscuit bombers") (Note: The war diary of the 21st Brigade reports that on 4 September, one killed and two injured by an airdrop.) were destroyed or put out of commission, leaving only one in service. This report by Gillison is indicative since there is considerable variation in the sources as to the number and type of planes damaged and destroyed. (Note: Gillison appears to refer to the transports generically as "Dakotas". It is apparent from the other sources that the transport planes involved were a mix of civilian and military types rather than the Douglas C-47 Skytrain, to which this designation specifically applies.) What is clear is that this was a disastrous event that significantly curtailed the Allied capacity to resupply the troops fighting along the track. Moremon says that no aircraft were available for dropping until 23 August while McCathy states this as 22 August. Given the tenuous supply situation, this was a significant break. Civilian aircraft and pilots were pressed into service in an effort to meet demand. They were mainly used in flights between Australia and New Guinea or in rear areas in order to release military planes and personnel for service in forward areas but this did not solve the immediate problem.

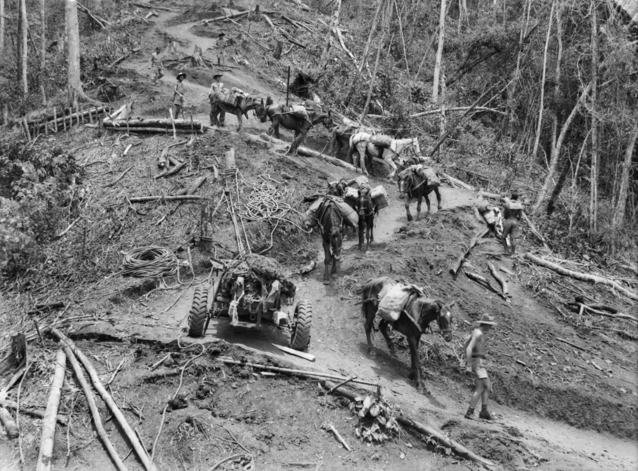
Mules and pack horses being led past a 25-pounder being hauled forward on the first leg of the track from Owers' Corner (AWM027023)

Potts' two battalions commenced their advance along the track on the basis that 40,000 rations plus ammunition and other supplies had been stockpiled at Myola and additional supplies existed at staging points along the route. Potts arrived at Myola on 21 August to find only 8,000 rations (five days' reserve) and a further two days' reserve forward. Potts was forced to hold his force at Myola until a sufficient reserve could be accumulated—which impacted his conduct of the battle at Isurava (commencing 26 August).

The "missing" rations have been the subject of investigation—both at the time and subsequently. Dudley McCarthy, the Australian official historian, concluded that the reason most likely lay in "faulty [staff] work by inexperienced staff". Rowell's investigation, made at the time, determined that the rations had been dispatched. The second and much larger, dry lake bed, Myola 2, was discovered by a patrol on 21 August. At this time, maps showed and air crew expected only one. John Moremon hypothesises that drops were likely made at the wrong one. (Note: Myola 2 was used as the main drop zone during the Australian advance. There are no reports identified, of finding remnants of such a large quantity of rations.) Rowell noted in his memoirs that "all through the New Guinea Campaign cargo dropping remained notoriously unreliable".

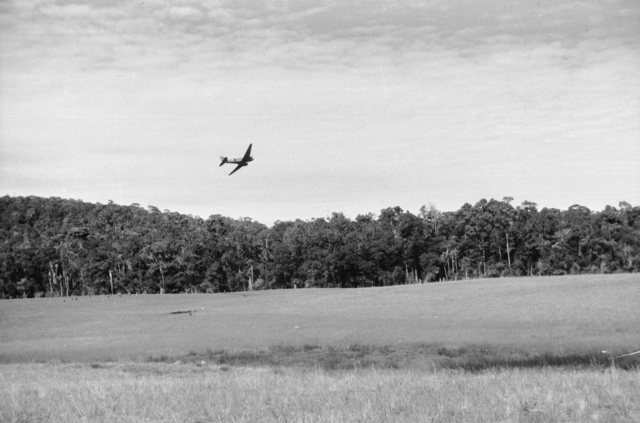
An airdrop over Myola (AWM P02424.071)

In consequence of this short-fall and the earlier loss of transports at Port Moresby, urgent requests were forwarded by Rowell through the chain-of-command. Transport aircraft in the theatre at this time were largely operated by the Fifth Air Force, with Major General George Kenney commanding Allied Air Forces. MacArthur released six Douglas Dauntless dive bombers, one B-17 Flying Fortress and two transports. He noted that, at the time, there were only thirty transport planes in Australia and, of these, only 50 per cent were available at any one time. His response stated that the resources being made available should be sufficient for the 9,000 kilograms (20,000 lb) of supplies necessary to supply forces at Wau and along the track (as estimated by Rowell) each day. The figure supplied by Rowell explicitly did not allow for any reserve to be established. MacArthur concluded by saying:

Air supply must necessarily be considered an emergency rather than a normal means of supply. Consequently every effort should be made by the GOC, NGF, to develop other means of supply.

When Potts asked for some additional 800 labourers to help alleviate the supply situation, Rowell replied that only 300 could be provided. There was simply not the labour force available to establish a reserve. As Allen was advancing, he estimated that he required 3,000 carriers to support his operations forward of Myola but in late October, there were only 1,250 forward of Myola and none to the rear. During the Australian advance, Myola 2 was developed as the major resupply point. A strip was developed there, being a larger area, but it was considered too risky for general use.

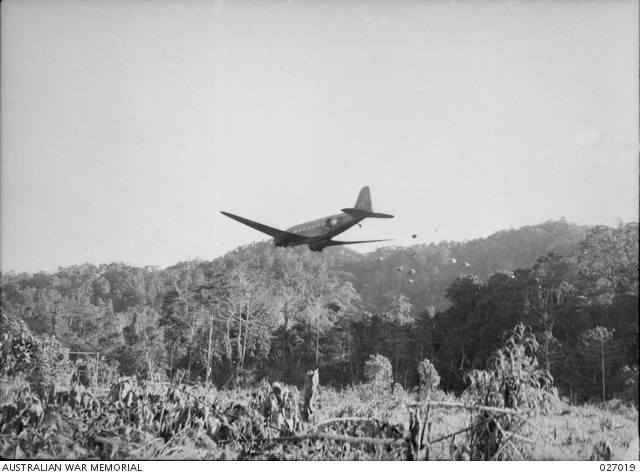
A US Douglas C-47 Skytrain transport plane dropping supplies to the Australian 25th Brigade near Nauro Village in October 1942

As Potts withdrew from Isurava, Myola was lost—his force destroying anything usable as it left. Successive withdrawals towards the start of the track eased the supply burden. As Allen advanced, following the withdrawing Japanese forces, he was acutely aware of the logistical problems facing his force. He faced pressure from Blamey and MacArthur to advance his forces without being able to assure their supply. His reluctance to do so was a significant factor leading to his replacement. McCarthy observes: "There was little that General Vasey could add immediately to General Allen's planning."

==== Japanese logistics ====
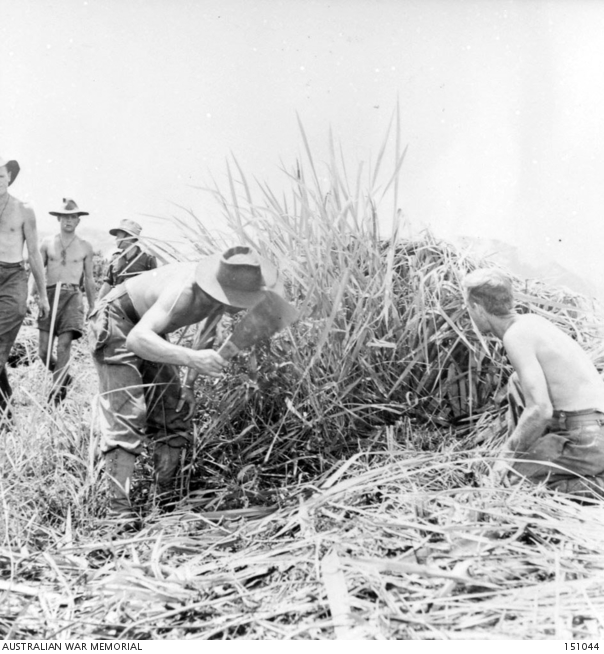
Australian troops clearing grass and obstacles from the airstrip at Kokoda. The Japanese failed to take advantage of the strip. (AWM151044)

Initial Japanese reconnaissance had indicated a trafficable road to Kokoda. Bullard reports the error in this. While the road was improved for vehicle transport to Sonobo, about halfway from Gona to Wairopi, levies from Rabaul and pack-horses would have to carry supplies the remaining distance to Kokoda and further forward. Meanwhile, allied airpower interfered with the Japanese line-of-communication, particularly at the Kumusi River, making it uncrossable by day. Soldiers advanced from Kokoda carrying 16 days' rations. The advance, from the end of July until Ioribaiwa, in mid September was to last for over forty-five days. Their load included ammunition for the artillery and machine guns as well as 18 kilograms (40 lb) of rice per man.

A convoy carrying four independent supply companies destined to arrive at Buna on 20 September was delayed: "The mechanism for maintaining supply for the South Seas Force was broken." By the time the Japanese had advanced to Ioribaiwa, there was extreme rationing and the daily rice ration had been reduced to 180 millilitres (6.3 imp fl oz; 6.1 US fl oz) per day without the prospect of captured stores alleviating the difficulty. Horii's force was unable to advance further. As the Japanese withdrew, Allied soldiers found that many Japanese had died of malnutrition with evidence that some Japanese had been reduced to eating wood, grass, roots and other inedible material. Australian soldiers were also confronted with evidence of cannibalism. Dead and wounded Australian and Japanese soldiers who had been left behind in the Australian retreat from Templeton's Crossing were stripped of flesh. In 1987, a Japanese documentary Yuki Yukite Shingun contained interviews with Japanese soldiers who confessed to cannibalism in New Guinea. The evidence of cannibalism inflamed and angered the feelings of the Australians towards their adversaries.

The Japanese made little use of aerial resupply; an exception recorded is the drop of supplies at Kokoda on 23 September. When Australian forces reoccupied Kokoda, they found the strip there overgrown and unused.

==== Papuan labour ====
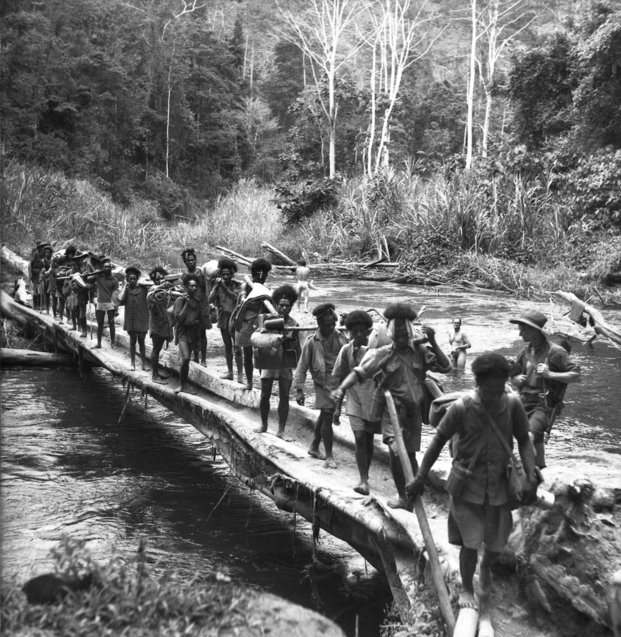
Papuan carriers in Australian service crossing a river between Nauro and Menari in October 1942

The pre-war plantation economy of the Australian territories of Papua and New Guinea was based on a system of indentured labour. On 15 June 1942, Morris issued the Employment of Natives Order under the National Security (Emergency Control) Regulations. This provided for the conscription of Papuan labour to support the Australian war effort. While resupply of the Australian forces on the track would have collapsed without airdrops, the native carrier force remained an essential component, moving supplies forward from the drop zones under arduous conditions. Captain Geoffrey 'Doc' Vernon wrote of the conditions endured: "The condition of our carriers at Eora Creek caused me more concern than that of the wounded ... Overwork, overloading ... exposure, cold and underfeeding were the common lot. Every evening scores of carriers came in, slung their loads down and lay exhausted on the ground."

On their return, they would carry back the wounded with care: for which they have been mythologised as the "Fuzzy Wuzzy Angels". There are many testaments of praise for the care rendered. In relation to the carriers, Captain (later Major) Henry Steward wrote after the war that "the men on the stretchers ...[were] ... tended with the devotion of a mother and the care of a nurse", while Frank Kingsley Norris recounted that, "if night finds the stretcher still on the track, they will find a level spot and build a shelter over the patient. They will make him as comfortable as possible, fetch him water and feed him if food is available—regardless of their own needs. They sleep four each side of the stretcher and if the patient moves or requires any attention during the night, this is given instantly".

The carrier force under command of Kienzle supporting the Australian advance is reported at over 1,600. The total number that worked on the track was significantly larger, with attrition through desertion and sickness. Author Paul Ham estimates a total of up to 3,000 and claims a desertion rate of 30 per cent. The ever-increasing need for labour impacted on the communities from which they were conscripted by reducing the capacity for food production.

The Japanese also relied on native labour to transport supplies for their forces on the Kokoda Track. Around 2,000 indentured workers were transported to the mainland from Rabaul, and a further 300 residents of the north coast of Papua were recruited. These labourers were poorly treated, and suffered from overwork. Many carriers who became sick or injured were murdered by Japanese forces. This mistreatment caused high desertion rates among the Papuan carriers. As the Japanese had difficulty obtaining replacement carriers, the casualties and desertions contributed to shortfalls in the quantities of supplies which reached the combat troops.

==== Medical ====
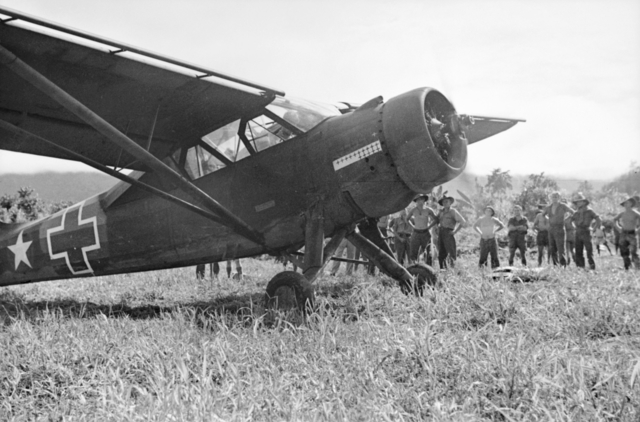
A Stinson L-1 Vigilant air ambulance operating at Kokoda, November 1942 (AWM P02424.085)

When the 21st Brigade joined the fighting early in the campaign, the medical plan was for evacuation forward to Kokoda, and there, by air, on the premise that it would soon be recaptured. This was discarded as it quickly became apparent that this would not happen and any serious casualties were moved back toward Myola. Potts had requested air evacuation but this was refused for a lack of suitable aircraft.

As Myola was threatened by the Japanese advance, the casualties gathered there had to be evacuated to the head of the track. The report of then Colonel Norris, the 7th Division's senior medical officer, noted the difficulty of providing sufficient means to move stretchers. Each required eight bearers which meant those wounded who were able to stagger were treated with "absolute ruthlessness" and not provided with stretchers. In one case, a casualty with a severely fractured patella (kneecap) walked for six days and some with worse injuries volunteered to walk to free a stretcher for the more seriously wounded.

As the Australians advanced back along the track to Kokoda, Myola again became the main evacuation point. Aircraft were sent from Australia and approximately 40 patients were evacuated by air before a Ford Trimotor and a single-engined Stinson of unspecified model both crashed and further air evacuation from Myola was suspended.

With the recapture of Kokoda, air landings and evacuation could occur from its landing strip and it became the main point of evacuation. As well as C–47s landing with supplies, Stinson L-1 Vigilant light observation aircraft converted for use as air ambulances, flew into Kokoda. (Note: See caption for AWM photograph "P02424.085". for details. "150934". identifies the plane in that photograph as an Aeronca L-3 but the distinctive difference in the engine cowling identifies this as an L–1.) At the start of November, the detachment at Myola was caring for 438 sick and wounded. Many walked back along the track as they became sufficiently well to make the trek. Some had to wait up to two-and-a-half months before porters were available to carry the stretcher cases forward to Kokoda for evacuation by air. The last arrived at Port Moresby only a couple of days before Christmas. (Note: Pilger 1993, p. 60 is quite specific as to the evacuation being forward to Kokoda for cases that had to be carried even though McCarthy 1959, p. 317 and Walker 1956, pp. 76–77 are somewhat ambiguous in respect to what actually occurred. Moremon 2000, pp. 328–329 supports Pilger in this matter.) Norris later wrote and questioned: "why after three years of war no adequate ambulance planes were available"?

=== Heavy weapons ===
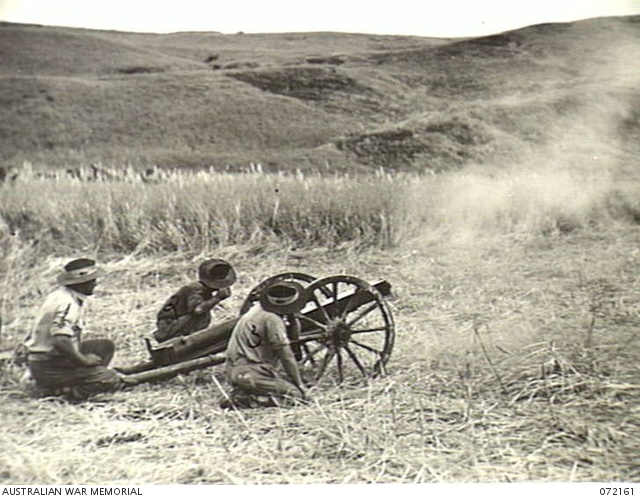
Members of 14th Field Regiment firing a captured 75 mm Type 41 regimental gun – 1944 (AWM072161)

Bullard reports that, while the munitions of the 144th Regiment were limited by what they could carry, this included eighteen [medium] machine guns (Type 92 Juki), (Note: It fired the 7.7×58mm Arisaka round which was "heavier" than the 6.5×50mmSR Arisaka fired from the Type 38 Arisaka rifle. Though designated as a heavy machine gun at the time, it fired a rifle sized cartridge and is thereby generally considered to be a medium machine gun.) three battalion (infantry) guns, two rapid-fire guns and two regimental artillery guns. The mountain artillery battalion deployed with three companies servicing a gun each, while leaving one gun in reserve at Buna. The 44th Regiment deployed with thirteen medium machine guns, three battalion guns, one regimental gun and one rapid-fire gun. Anderson indicates that the regimental and mountain artillery battalion guns were of the 75 mm Type 41, while the infantry guns were of the 70 mm Type 92. As the 37 mm guns were described as "rapid fire", these were most likely the dual-purpose Type 94 anti-tank gun which was a rapid-fire gun, as distinct from the earlier Type 11 37 mm infantry gun. (Note: Sometimes referred to as a "quick fire" gun because of its rapid rate of fire. This should not be confused with the British nomenclature, where "quick fire" (abbreviated "QF" - as in, the Ordnance QF 25-pounder) referred to artillery that fire cartridges as opposed to a shell and separate charge bags.) It employed an automatic cartridge ejection and was capable of firing up to 30 rounds per minute. Primarily a direct-fire weapon, using telescopic sights, it had an effective range of 2,870 metres (3,140 yd) and could be broken down into four loads of 100 kilograms (220 lb). The Type 92 battalion gun was a 70 mm light howitzer capable of direct and indirect fire. It had an effective range of 2,800 metres (3,060 yd), firing a high-explosive projectile of 3.795 kilograms (8.37 lb). (Note: Earlier sources refer to the Japanese using [medium] mortars and heavy mortars and it would appear that this gun has been identified as such.) The Type 41 was a mountain gun capable of firing a 5.8-kilogram (13 lb) high-explosive projectile to a maximum range of 7,000 metres (7,700 yd). It could be broken down into eleven units of not more than 95 kilograms (210 lb).

The Australian brigade structure included a regiment of artillery, consisting of two batteries, each equipped with twelve Ordnance QF 25-pounder guns. These had a range of 12,300 metres (13,400 yd) but weighed 1,800 kilograms (4,000 lb) and were not intended to be broken down into pack loads. As the Japanese advance threatened Imita Ridge the 14th Field Regiment (less one battery) deployed to near the head of the track to defend against a break-out by the Japanese into more open country. Two guns were hauled to Owers' Corner by caterpillar tractor. On 20 September, they shelled the Japanese positions at Ioribaiwa from a range of 10,000 metres (11,000 yd). A third gun was stripped down and man-handled forward, taking 50 men five days to move it just three kilometres (2 mi) through the mountainous jungle terrain. However, by time they were in position and ready to fire the Japanese were out of range.

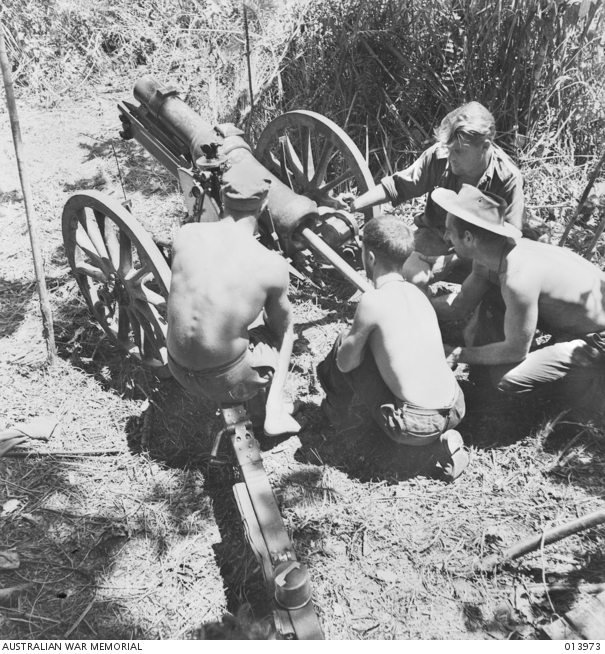
The 1st Mountain Battery was raised and a gun flown to Kokoda. A gun of the battery is shown here in action near Buna. (AWM013973)

In response to the situation, the 1st Mountain Battery was raised and equipped with 3.7-inch pack howitzers hastily obtained from the Royal New Zealand Navy. Initially it was intended that the guns would be moved by pack horse; however, following the unit's arrival in Port Moresby in early October it soon became clear that horses would be unsuited to the humid conditions in New Guinea with the guns to be moved by jeeps and native carriers instead. It took about 90 porters to move one gun without ammunition. The battery did not take part in the fighting along the track but on 15 November, a detachment with one gun was flown into Kokoda to support the Australian 7th Division.

An Australian infantry battalion had a mortar platoon with four Ordnance ML 3-inch mortars, capable of throwing a 4.5 kilograms (9.9 lb) round 1,500 metres (1,600 yd). (Note: At about this time, improvements increased the range to about 2,500 metres (2,700 yd).) Battalions also had access to the Vickers medium machine gun. (Note: The establishment of Vickers within battalions at the time is unclear and likely varied between Militia and AIF units. War diary entries for the 39th Battalion refer to its machine gun company at Deniki, while other sources refer to this as E Company. Hocking explains that following a reorganisation of the 6th Division's infantry battalions in late 1939, the machine gun platoons that had previously existed within each battalion were removed and centralised in a single unit at divisional level.) The Vickers, while water cooled, was of similar weight and capability to the Juki employed by the Japanese. When Australian forces deployed forward, neither of these weapons were carried. It was considered that they were too heavy to be carried and that they could not be effectively employed in jungle terrain.

A post action report by the 2/14th Battalion identified that it was a mistake not to take these weapons forward. By the time of the Battle of Brigade Hill–Mission Ridge (from about 6 September), the 21st Brigade was operating a section of three 3-inch mortars that had been parachuted into Myola. (Note: Moremon 2000, p. 179 reports a message from NGF to Potts of 24 August that it intended to drop five 3–in mortars and 300 bombs each at Myola as soon as the ration situation permitted.) When the Australians commenced the advance from Imita Ridge, most battalions moving forward carried a 3-inch mortar with twenty-four bombs and one Vickers machine gun with 3,000 rounds.

Despite this increased fire-power, the Japanese still held a significant advantage by quantity and range. McCarthy recounts instances where Australian mortars and Vickers machine guns brought into service were quickly targeted and taken out by Japanese artillery. There was also a high rate of misfires with mortar ammunition that had been airdropped and, after such a round exploded in the barrel and killed the crew, the use of airdropped mortar ammunition was suspended by the 16th Brigade.

The Japanese carried into the mountains thirteen artillery pieces and employed fifteen in the Battle of Oivi–Gorari at the end of the campaign. While Anderson reports that approximately 940 men were responsible for carrying the guns, ammunition and other paraphernalia across the Owen Stanleys, he concludes that, despite this burden: "Throughout the Kokoda campaign the Japanese held one distinct advantage over the Australians: artillery. The Japanese use of artillery pieces in each Kokoda battle was a force multiplier, and the Australians were never able to match the Japanese ranged weapons." He attributes around 35 per cent of the Australian casualties to the Japanese artillery but observes that the effect upon morale was perhaps of equal significance: "The helplessness felt by the men who were subjected to relentless bombardment without the means to retaliate sapped both their number and their spirit." Williams asserts that: "Japanese artillery provided an important, perhaps decisive, role on the battlefields of the Kokoda Track."

==== Other equipment ====
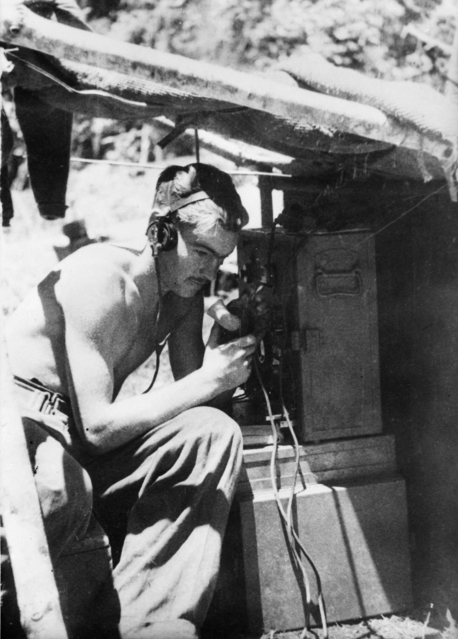
Radio set operated by Signalman James Pashley (AWM P02038.146)

Australian soldiers initially entered battle wearing a khaki uniform which contrasted with the darker greens of the jungle. Moreover, webbing of the 21st Brigade had been bleached white from their service in Syria. In contrast, the Japanese wore a green uniform more suited to the jungle environment and were adept at camouflage. By the time the 25th Brigade was committed to the fighting, it was wearing jungle green—albeit that these were khaki uniforms that had been quickly dyed. This dye ran and caused skin complaints among the wearers.

Much of the Australian equipment was standardised across military forces of the British Empire, which resulted in a force structure intended for fighting in open country and highly reliant on motor transport. Consequently, weight was not so much a consideration where equipment was not intended to be man-packed. The 109 radio set and associated equipment required nineteen carriers to transport, were temperamental as a result of the "excessive handling" and were susceptible to moisture and humidity. In contrast, the Japanese used compact wireless sets and lightweight aluminium signal wire.

Captured stocks of Mills bombs (model 36M) were valued by the Japanese. The lever and striker mechanism of the Mills bomb was considered superior to their own service grenade, the Type 99, which had to be struck on a hard object to ignite the fuze immediately before throwing.

=== Air operations ===
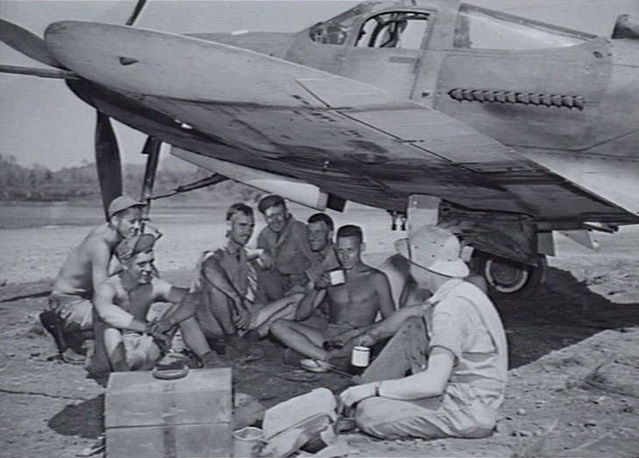
A USAAF Bell P-39 Airacobra and ground crew, Port Moresby, August 1942 (AWM025894)

Apart from the significant logistical contribution in support of the Australian forces, air operations included bombing missions against Rabaul, the Japanese base supporting the landings in Papua, and the attempts to resupply and reinforce the beachheads around Buna and Gona. Bombers were based in Australia, staging through Port Moresby—resulting in considerable crew fatigue.

Bombing sorties also targeted the beachheads, particularly the airfield being constructed at Buna, and the Japanese line of communication. Regular missions against Buna effectively neutralised the airfield—damaging it almost as fast as it could be repaired, thereby rendering it ineffective. The crossing of the Kumusi at Wairopi was regularly targeted and bridging works repeatedly destroyed. The Australian forces on the track called for bombing and strafing missions in support of operations on several occasions but such requests were not always fulfilled. Weather conditions across the range constantly interfered with operations.

=== Allied command ===
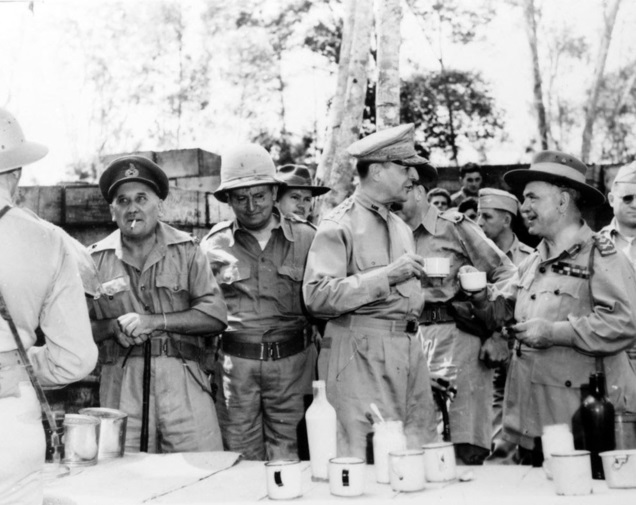
New Guinea. October 1942. A tea break at a canteen in the forward areas during a tour of inspection by US General, Douglas MacArthur. In the background, left to right, are: Major General G. S. Allen, Commander, Australian 7th Division AIF; Mr F. M. Forde, Australian Minister for the Army; General MacArthur, Supreme Commander, South West Pacific Area; and General Sir Thomas Blamey, Commander, Allied Land Forces AWM150836

MacArthur, after being ordered to leave the Philippines, arrived in Australia on 17 March 1942 and was appointed Supreme Commander of Allied Forces in the South West Pacific Area (SWPA). MacArthur had to compete with Admiral Chester Nimitz's plan to drive towards Japan through the central Pacific. Ambitious, he was concerned that his command should not be sidelined. Blamey had been recalled from the Middle East, arriving in Australia on 23 March 1942. Shortly after, he was appointed as commander-in-chief of the Australian Army and subsequently, to the separate position, which he simultaneously held, of commander, allied land forces SWPA.

Papua and New Guinea had been the Australian 8th Military District under command of Morris. On 9 April 1942, it was formed into New Guinea Force, with Morris promoted major general. As events escalated and the forces involved increased, Rowell arrived from Australia with HQ I Corps, taking command of the force on 12 August 1942. Morris was moved to command the Australian New Guinea Administrative Unit (ANGAU). At about this time, 7th Division was deploying to New Guinea and responsibility for the immediate defence of Port Moresby, including Maroubra Force and the Kokoda Track operation was devolved to divisional headquarters under Allan. (Note: New Guinea Force Operation Instruction No. 24 of 18 August 1942.)

Both Blamey's Allied Land Headquarters (LHQ) and MacArthur's General Headquarters (GHQ) were increasingly alarmed by the situation on the track, with Australian forces suffering a series of reversals, and by the Japanese landings at Milne Bay (this battle was fought from 25 August to 7 September 1942). Vasey, then Blamey's deputy chief of the general staff, wrote privately to Rowell on 1 September, that "GHQ is like a bloody barometer in a cyclone—up and down every two minutes". MacArthur also had a poor opinion of the Australian troops and no real appreciation of the conditions under which the fighting in New Guinea was being conducted. On 6 September, MacArthur wrote to General George Marshall that, "the Australians have proven themselves unable to match the enemy in jungle fighting. Aggressive leadership is lacking." Jones observes, "The attitude that the Australians were poor fighters pervaded thinking at MacArthur's headquarters".

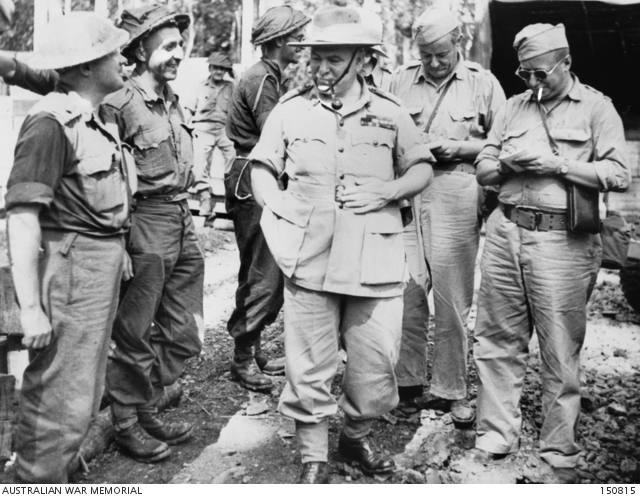
General Sir Thomas Blamey chatting with troops during MacArthur's visit (AWM150815)

The Australian government was also concerned. On 9 September, Army Minister Frank Forde directed Blamey to visit Port Moresby, which he did, from 12 to 14 September. On his return, he was able to assure the government of his confidence in Rowell and that the situation was in hand. Nonetheless, MacArthur persuaded the Australian Prime Minister, John Curtin, to send Blamey to New Guinea to take command there and "energise the situation". By this manoeuvre, MacArthur ensured that Blamey would be the scapegoat if Port Moresby fell.

MacArthur visited Port Moresby briefly from 2 October. On 3 October, he went as far forward as Owers' Corner, where he spent about an hour. He was present as the 16th Brigade, under Brigadier John Lloyd, was commencing its advance along the track. He subsequently established his advance headquarters in Port Moresby on 6 November 1942 (just after Kokoda was reoccupied) until January 1943.

==== Command crisis ====
The "command crisis" is referred to by McCarthy (among others) in the Australian official history as part of a chapter title: "Ioriabiawa: and a command in crisis". Academic and historian David Horner's first book is titled Crisis of Command: Australian Generalship and the Japanese Threat, 1941–1943, in which he studies the generalship in these early stages of the war with Japan. Anderson notes that, while the "command crisis" specifically relates to Blamey's sacking of Rowell, the phrase can also be applied to the sackings of Allen and Potts.

===== Rowell =====
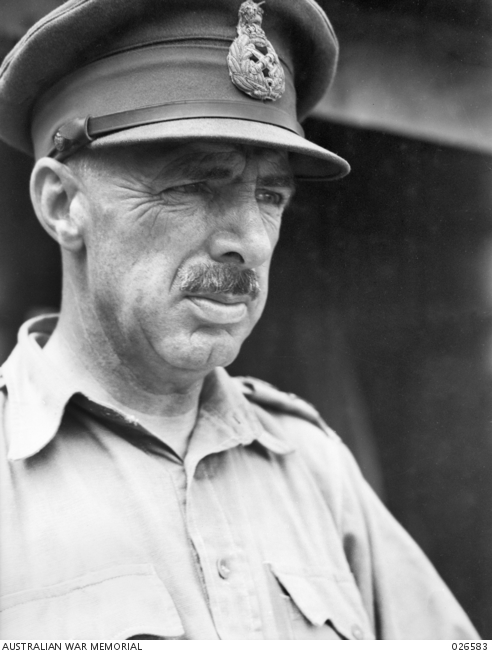
Lieutenant General Sydney Rowell (AWM26583)

Complying with Curtin's directive, albeit reluctantly, Blamey arrived in Port Moresby on 23 September 1942 with only a small personal staff. It was a situation which Blamey felt was quite reasonable but with which Rowell saw significant difficulties. Rowell's objections were that the circumstances of Blamey's presence in his headquarters would ultimately undermine the good conduct of its operation by forcing it to serve two masters. McCarthy's reporting of the initial situation suggests that Blamey, while maintaining his position, was conciliatory and empathetic toward Rowell's concerns. Allen recounts that Rowell's objection was not to Blamey using his headquarters as much as the expectation that he (Rowell) was expected to be Blamey's chief-of-staff. Horner observes that this was much how the headquarters subsequently operated under Herring. Underpinning the events that followed was bad blood between them stemming from Blamey's conduct in the Middle East and Greece. Perhaps, more importantly, there was a sense of disappointment in Blamey's lack of support by way of resolve to oppose the decision to send Blamey to New Guinea. In a letter to Major General Cyril Clowes at Milne Bay, Rowell said on this, "Either I am fit to command the show or I am not."

The situation continued to simmer until it came to a head after Blamey had visited Milne Bay on 25 September at MacArthur's suggestion and ordered Clowes to send a force by air to Wanigela. Major General George Kenney noted that Rowell was "not even consulted anymore". Rowell confronted Blamey on the issue and was relieved of command on 28 September. In a communication to Curtin, Blamey referred to Rowell as insubordinate and obstructive. Rowell was replaced by Lieutenant General Edmund Herring.

===== Allen =====
On 9 September 1942, Allen's command responsibilities were narrowed to the direct prosecution of the Kokoda Track campaign and flank protection. (Note: New Guinea Force Operation Instruction No. 26 of 9 September 1942.) Important to subsequent events, NGF retained control of aerial resupply. The Australian advance commenced with the attack of 28 September against the (abandoned) Japanese positions on Ioribaiwa Ridge. The 16th Brigade commenced to advance forward on 3 October.

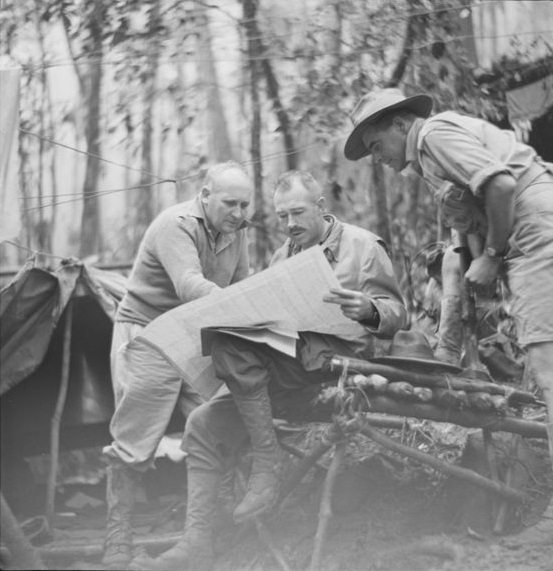
Major General Arthur Allen (left) and Brigadier Ken Eather (centre), September 1942 (AWM026750)

Allen had advanced his headquarters to Menari by 11 October. The 25th Brigade was advancing on two tracks from Efogi, toward Templeton's Crossing. He was mindful of the need to keep his troops fresh enough to fight and of the supply problems imposed by operations over the track. There were already difficulties in air drops meeting the division's needs. These concerns were expressed to Herring on 7 October, including the need to create a reserve over and above the daily needs. As a consequence, the supply programme intensified.

On 5 October, Blamey wrote to MacArthur in "hard terms" of the logistical difficulties faced by NGF and specifically, Allen. Despite this, Blamey and MacArthur pressured Allen to increase his rate of advance and Blamey forced the issue by only arranging for supplies to be dropped at Myola—effectively forcing Allen to advance to meet his point of supply. Anderson discusses this and identifies it as an "extremely risky" strategy. Blamey (and Herring) wanted Allen to maintain pressure on the retreating Japanese and push home the advantage. Dropping supplies forward maintains the momentum of advance but this quickly breaks down if the advance is stalled and there are limited reserves. The position of Blamey was premised on the proposition that the Japanese were an enemy in retreat. In fact, they had made a clean break from Ioriabiawa and had established defences that were blocking Allen's advance on both routes to Templeton's Crossing. With supplies dropped at Myola, Allen could not easily support the advance being made along the Mount Bellamy track and, until the position forward of Templeton' Crossing was secured, there was the risk of Myola being compromised.

On 17 October, Allen, now at Myola, received the following message from Blamey:

General MacArthur considers quote extremely light casualties indicate no serious effort yet made to displace enemy unquote. You will attack enemy with energy and all possible speed at each point of resistance. Essential that Kokoda airfield be taken at earliest. Apparent enemy gaining time by delaying you with inferior strength.

Allen's response was measured. He requested that any decision on his progress be deferred until a report could be made by a liaison officer or more senior officer. (Note: Lieutenant Colonel Minogue, a liaison officer from HQ NGF was forward with Allen, attending a conference at Myola on 23 October, but Blamey acted to relieve Allen before his report was received) MacArthur and Blamey continued to press Allen through the delays experienced at Templeton's Crossing and Eora Village. To his credit, Allen stood by his subordinates. Just as the 16th Brigade was advancing on Eora Village, a signal from MacArthur through Blamey on 21 October further pressured Allen: "Operations reports show that progress on the trail is NOT repeat NOT satisfactory. The tactical handling of our troops in my opinion is faulty." Allen replied, in part: "I have complete confidence in my brigade commanders and troops and feel that they could not have done better." Allen's trust may have been misplaced though, as Anderson describes Lloyd as having "botched" the tactical handling of the first two days of the engagement at Eora Village that were just then unfolding. He also notes that the downward pressure being applied for haste likely weighed heavily in Lloyd's decision to proceed initially with a frontal attack. The pressure for more haste thereby contributed to increasing the delays. On 28 October, Blamey ordered Allen's recall and replacement by Vasey. Allen had vouched for the judgement and professionalism of his brigade commanders (in this case, specifically Lloyd) and in this, he was ultimately responsible; however, Anderson opines that Allen's replacement may have been inevitable, regardless of the justification.

===== Potts =====
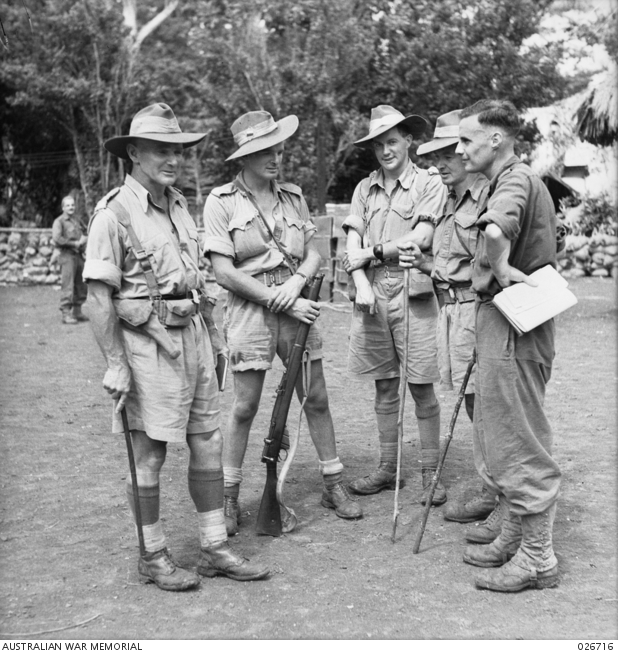
Brigadier Arnold Potts (left), forward area, September 1942 (AWM026716)

Potts had been sent forward to Isurava with orders to attack and recapture Kokoda. Instead, his force was unable to withstand the Japanese attacks and he was forced to conduct a fighting withdrawal, suffering a disastrous defeat at Brigade Hill. Increasingly concerned, MacArthur applied pressure to the chain-of-command. Potts was recalled to Port Moresby by Rowell on 10 September, with Porter as his replacement. Horner reports Rowell's motive as dissatisfaction with Potts' "mishandling" of his brigade and a need to obtain a first-hand account of conditions. Anderson reports Allen agreed with the decision, judging that Potts was "either tired or losing a grip of the situation". On arriving at Port Moresby, Potts was interviewed by Rowell and Allen, whereupon, satisfied with his performance, he was returned to command his brigade.

However, in a private interview (overheard by Potts' staff captain, Ken Murdoch) on 22 October, the day of the "running rabbit" address, Blamey told Potts he was no longer required in New Guinea: "Failures like the Kokoda Trail ... could not be tolerated—the men had shown that something was lacking ..[and he] blamed the leaders." (Note: This dressing-down indicates the intent of Blamey's subsequent address that day to the soldiers of the 21st Brigade.) Potts was transferred to command the 23rd Brigade reforming in Darwin, exchanging postings with Brigadier Ivan Dougherty. Herring has claimed that the decision was his—feeling that Potts needed to be rested and wanting Dougherty to take the position. Murdoch was inundated with resignation papers from officers affronted by Potts' treatment. Potts instructed Murdoch to reject all resignations.

====== The "running rabbits" incident ======
On 22 October, after the relief of the 21st Brigade by the 25th Brigade, Blamey visited Koitaki, near Port Moresby, where the 21st Brigade was encamped. Shortly after relieving Potts, Blamey addressed the men of the 21st Brigade on a parade ground. The men of the Maroubra Force expected congratulations for their efforts in holding back the Japanese. Instead of praising them, Blamey told the brigade that they had been "beaten" by inferior forces, and that "no soldier should be afraid to die". "Remember," Blamey was reported as saying, "it's the rabbit who runs who gets shot, not the man holding the gun." There was a wave of murmurs and restlessness among the soldiers. Officers and senior non-commissioned officers (NCOs) managed to quiet the soldiers and many later said that Blamey was lucky to escape with his life. During the march-past, many disobeyed the "eyes right" order. In a later letter to his wife, an enraged Brigadier Potts swore to "fry his [Blamey's] soul in the afterlife" over this incident. According to witnesses, when Blamey subsequently visited Australian wounded in the camp hospital, inmates nibbled lettuce, while wrinkling their noses and whispering "run, rabbit, run" (the chorus of a popular song during the war).

===== Analysis =====
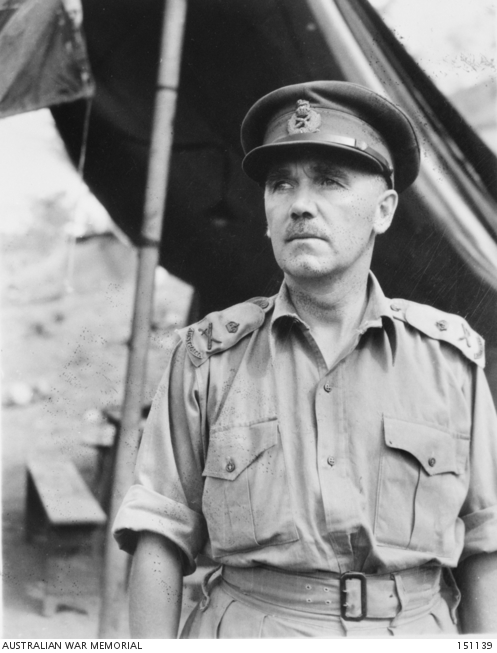
Lieutenant General Edmund Herring (AWM151139)

Historian Peter Dean acknowledges the general interpretation that the actions of MacArthur and Blamey were "to salvage their own positions at the expense of the troops" but reports that MacArthur, himself, was under pressure, citing a cable from the US Joint Chiefs to MacArthur of 16 October, "reminding him that they viewed the situation in Papua as 'critical'". Dean also notes that this coincided with the relief of Vice Admiral Robert Ghormley, Commander-in-Chief of US forces in the south Pacific who had operational control of the forces engaged at Guadalcanal. The pressure brought to bear by MacArthur was in the face of "complicated operational and strategic contexts", stating that, "an understanding of these contexts has been poorly done in most accounts of the fighting [in Papua]." This is encapsulated in correspondence from Brigadier General Stephen J. Chamberlin (MacArthur's operations chief) to MacArthur's Chief-of-Staff, Richard K. Sutherland, of 30 October 1942: "the key to our plan of action lies in the success or failure of the South Pacific in holding Guadalcanal ..." (that is, that the position at Guadalcanal was tenuous).

However, with specific reference to Allen, Horner finds, "MacArthur showed an abysmal lack of trust in his subordinate [Blamey and his view that Allen was doing all he could], and an unwarranted interference in the tactical handling of troops some 1,500 miles from his headquarters." While the Curtin government was largely steadfast in recalling the 2nd AIF from the Middle East to Australia against considerable opposition from Churchill, (Note: Churchill wished to divert at least part of the force to Burma.) Horner observes the government's complete dependence on MacArthur, which compromised Blamey's relationship with it. His analysis also observes that these events were underpinned by the logistical problems faced by the NGF on the track and elsewhere.

Horner's criticism of Blamey in sacking Allen is that he was in no position to accurately assess Allen's performance, observing that if Vasey could be flown into Myola to relieve Allen, then an assessment could have been arranged using the same means. Blamey acted to placate MacArthur because he (Blamey) was unwilling to risk his own job. Blamey had demonstrated "a remarkable lack of loyalty" toward his subordinate. To some degree, Herring shares in this criticism. Williams, however, observes that Allen's advance was nonetheless slower than might reasonably have been expected and that the criticisms leveled at him and leading to his sacking were reasonably justified.

Horner observes of Rowell, that his only failure was an inability to work with Blamey and that Blamey was more culpable in that he was unwilling to risk his own position. He should have shown more trust and loyalty toward his subordinate, negated MacArthur's manoeuvring, and avoided the situation.

Regardless of the justifications made, the sackings created a climate of suspicion, animosity, personal rivalries and a "toxic atmosphere" which pervaded the senior ranks and was detrimental to the war effort. Horner observes that Blamey trod a precarious line between "maintaining his own position and protecting the Australian commanders, between risking his own replacement and risking the distrust of his subordinates". Horner notes, "the arguments between generals and politicians might seem of little consequence. But the opposite is the case. It was errors by men like MacArthur and Blamey which lead to the near disaster in New Guinea. As usual, it was the men in the front line who paid the heaviest price."

== First phase – Japanese advance ==
=== Japanese landings and initial advance ===
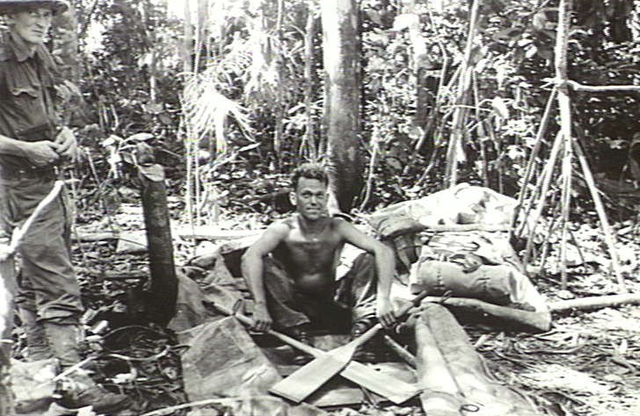
The Japanese brought rubber boats to cross the Kumusi River as they advanced. This one was left as they retreated. (AWM013707)

The Japanese landings at Gona commenced at about 5:30 pm on 21 July 1942. They were opposed by Allied air attacks until darkness fell and again in the morning, for the loss of one transport ship. The Japanese landings were observed by patrols of the PIB and officers of the ANGAU. Templeton brought forward two of his platoons. His remaining platoon was to protect Kokoda. First contact was made at about 4.00 pm on 23 July. A PIB patrol led by Lieutenant Chalk ambushed advancing Japanese near Awala. The bridge across the Kumusi River at Wairopi was destroyed by the withdrawing Australians and the Japanese were harassed as they made a crossing.

Owen had flown to Kokoda on 24 July and went forward with Templeton to assess the situation. Owen then returned to Kokoda and called for reinforcements to be landed. An ambush position was sited about 700 metres (800 yd) east of Gorari and sprung at about midday on 25 July. The force of two platoons and the remaining PIB then withdrew to Oivi, taking up a position that evening. D Company's 16 Platoon arrived by air at Kokoda in two flights on 26 July. The first flight arrived at 10:00 am. They were immediately sent forward and had joined the force at Oivi before the Japanese attack at 3:00 pm. The force was able to hold the Japanese for a time, before being forced to retire on a secondary position. With the Japanese trying to encircle this position, Templeton was concerned for the second flight yet to arrive and set out to warn it. There was a burst of fire shortly after he left. Templeton was never seen again. (Note: The second flight, was nearing Oivi at 5:30 pm. Misinformed that Oivi was lost it returned to Kokoda.)

Watson took command. As the force was increasingly threatened by encirclement, it broke toward Deniki. At Kokoda, Owen had lost contact with his forward platoons and also withdrew to Deniki, departing at 11:00 am on 27 July. On the following morning, a small party of stragglers arrived. Having spent the previous night at Kokoda, they reported the village unoccupied. Leaving two sections at Deniki, Owen quickly advanced back to the village.

=== Battle of Kokoda ===
By 11:30 am, Owen had reoccupied Kokoda with a force consisting of B Company, the remaining PIB and members of the ANGAU that had joined Maroubra Force, variously numbered at between 80 and 148. (Note: McCarthy reports the force at Kokoda as 80, inclusive of the PIB, and notes two sections (nominally 20) left at Deniki under command of Lieutenant McClean. Williams gives a detailed tally of the force available to Owen, totalling 148, however; it is unclear whether this inclusive of McClean's detachment.) Owen called for reinforcements and shortly after, two planes appeared overhead but did not land as the defenders were slow in removing the barricades that had been placed across the airstrip and the pilots believed the situation too risky to land. There are inconsistencies in the various accounts of this event—most significantly, whether this occurred on 28 July or the day earlier, when Owen was about to abandon Kokoda. (Note: There is a discrepancy among the sources about the reasons behind why the American pilots did not land. Keogh states that they were ordered to return to base by Morris, who was unable to determine whether the Australians still held Kokoda. Brune, however, states that the pilots were not ordered to return to Port Moresby, but in fact refused to land due to fears that the Japanese would attack before they could take off again. According to eyewitnesses on one of the planes, the pilot repeatedly refused Lieutenant Lovell's demand that they land and that they could clearly see Australians clearing barricades from the airfield, indicating that the 39th Battalion still held the airfield. There is also some confusion as to who was on the aircraft and when this occurred. McCarthy and McAulay also recount that the event occurred on 28 July. However, the NGF war diary reports the incident as being on 27 July. It refers to the pilot observing "our troops and natives" removing barriers and a radio signal recalling the plane. The preceding entry in the diary was at 4:00 pm the previous day from Maroubra, advising that Kokoda "could not now be held" as the position at Oivi had been "surrounded and abandoned". The entry of 27 July records that the two planes had been sent before the message from Maroubra had been received. The war diary of the 39th Battalion is consistent with that of NGF, in stating that two planes containing troops of the 39th Battalion arrived over Kokoda on 27 July and returned without landing. It reports that these troops were from D Company and that Lieutenant Lovell, the battalion's adjutant, was also on board. Milner reports the flight of planes on 27 July, but none subsequently during the first battle. Williams goes further, saying that the planes of 28 July contained reinforcements from D Company of the 49th Battalion. When Owen reoccupied Kokoda he requested reinforcements and Morris issued orders for a company of the 49th Battalion and 3 Platoon (mortars) of the 39th Battalion to be air lifted to Kokoda early on 29 July. The succeeding entries in the diary record the loss of Kokoda in the early morning of 29 July and that arrangements for air transport of reinforcements to Maroubra were "again suspended". Orders that the reinforcement planned for 29 July was to be drawn from 49th Battalion are confirmed by the battalion's war diary, with flights due for departure at 6:00 am on 29 July.)

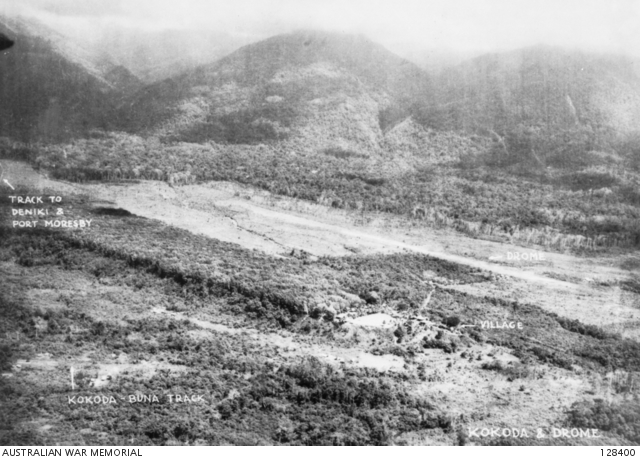
Kokoda village and airfield, August 1942. (AWM128400)

The Kokoda plateau is tongue shaped, with steep-sloped sides. The government station is located at its northern tip. The track from Oivi approaches the tip from the east. The track to Deniki runs down its centre to the south. Owen positioned his force around the station at its tip. At 1:30 pm, advance elements of the Japanese force that was to total approximately 200 were sighted. As the Japanese commander, Captain Ogawa, assembled his force, the Australian defenders were harassed through the night, including fire from light mortars and a Type 92 battalion gun, which was particularly telling as the Australians had no means to respond to it. The main attack commenced at 2:30 in the early morning of 29 July. Owen was in the forward positions to inspire his troops and received a mortal gunshot wound above his right eye. Watson assumed command and, as the force was being overrun, withdrew to Deniki.

Following the first battle at Kokoda, there was a brief pause in fighting during which both the Japanese and the Australians concentrated their forces for the next phase. For the Japanese, this was the 1st Battalion of the 144th Infantry Regiment, of which the 1st Company had faced B Company at Kokoda. The battalion was commanded by Lieutenant Colonel Tsukamoto Hatsuo. C Company and A Company of the 39th Battalion arrived at Deniki on 30 and 31 July respectively. Major Allan Cameron, Brigade Major of the 30th Brigade, had been sent forward to take command of Maroubra Force, arriving on 4 August. Cameron formed a low opinion of B Company after encountering troops moving southward along the track as he moved forward. Cameron's arrival coincided with a telephone line being established from the head of the track to Deniki. This greatly improved communications with Port Moresby. D Company arrived on 6 August. With this force, Cameron resolved to counterattack and recapture Kokoda. His plan was to advance along three routes assigned to each of his fresh companies with B Company securing Deniki. C Company was to advance along the main track to Kokoda. A Company, under Captain Noel Symington, was to advance along a parallel track to the east that was unknown to the Japanese. D Company was to advance on a track from Deniki to Pirivi. Pirivi was just south of the Oivi–Kokoda track and about 5 kilometres (3 mi) east of Kokoda. There, it was to take up a blocking position.

Final orders were issued by Cameron on the afternoon of 7 August, for an advance the following morning to the form-up points and an attack at noon. Cameron's force totaled 550 with the three attacking companies numbering 430. This was opposed by 522 men of 1/144 Battalion and a total force of 660, including an artillery platoon and combat engineers. Tsukamoto also chose to attack toward Deniki the same day along the main track and C Company encountered resistance, having advanced only 200 metres (200 yd).

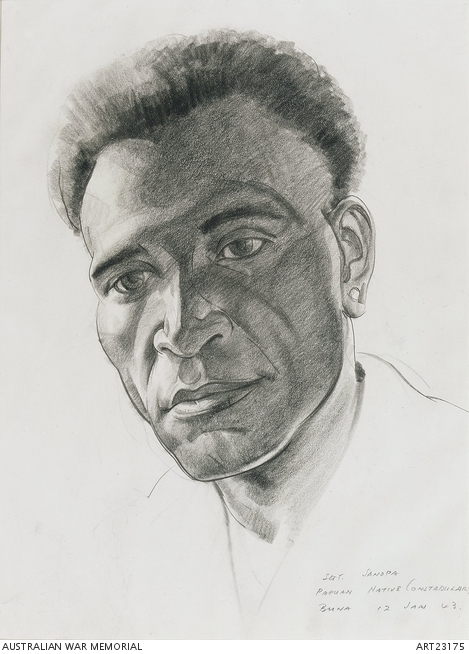
Corporal (later Sergeant) Sanopa, of the Royal Papuan Constabulary, attached to the PIB, featured prominently in the fighting around Kokoda. (By William Dargie AWM ART23175)

The attack on Kokoda was preceded with bombing and strafing by sixteen P–39s. Symington was able to advance into Kokoda and, meeting minimal resistance, was able to occupy it. A message was sent with Corporal Sanopa to Cameron requiring resupply by air and reinforcements to hold the village. C Company advancing on the main track, met increasing resistance as it came upon Tsukamoto's main force. Unable to advance further, it withdrew to Deniki, with the Japanese closely following. It arrived there at 5:50 pm. As D Company, under Captain Max Bidstrup took up a position at the junction on the Oivi–Kokoda track, it came under strong attack by engineers from both directions. Judging the attack on Kokoda had been unsuccessful he withdrew at 4:30 pm back to Deniki with his main force, arriving at about 1:30 pm on 9 August (with 17 Platoon, that had become isolated in the fighting, arriving the next day).

Sanopa arrived with Symington's message in the morning of 9 August. Cameron requested both an air drop of supplies and aerial reconnaissance to ascertain the situation at Kokoda. He was informed that resupply could not occur until the following day. Tsukamoto had sent a company back to Kokoda, arriving at 11:30 am on 9 August. Without resupply and facing determined attacks Symington's force held until 7:00 pm on 10 August. It then withdrew westwards by a circuitous route back to Isurava, arriving on 13 August. The reconnaissance flight occurred in the morning of 10 August but the promised resupply was delayed by weather until 12 August when it was dropped into the hands of the Japanese.

The Machine Gun Company of the 39th Battalion (Note: It is also referred to in some sources as E Company. See also McAulay 1992a, p. 58) had deployed along the track (less its medium machine guns) and had been holding a position at Isurava for about a week. Cameron called it forward, arriving in Deniki at 5:00 pm on 12 August, it exchanged roles with B Company. Patrols from Deniki had reported the Japanese advancing en masse from Kokoda. Their attack commenced 5:30 am on 13 August and continued throughout the day. Sporadic gunfire continued through most of the night and the attack was renewed the next morning. As the Japanese threatened his flanks and rear, Cameron ordered the withdrawal to Isurava at 9:50 am.

=== Battle of Isurava ===
Tsukamoto did not continue to press the advance but waited for Horii to concentrate his main force, estimating that the Australian force holding Kokoda had numbered around 1,000, to 1,200. The force available to Horii was based on five infantry battalions with supporting arms and services variously reported at 3,000 and 5,000 strong. Horii planned to attack with four infantry battalions, holding one of these in immediate reserve to exploit the result. The force that engaged the Australians at Isurava totaled 2,130, including artillery.

On 16 August, Lieutenant Colonel Ralph Honner arrived at Isurava to take command of the 39th Battalion. He also assumed command of Maroubra Force which, by then, included the first company of the 53rd Battalion to arrive at Alola, approximately 2 kilometres (2,200 yd) south of Isurava. Command passed to Porter when he arrived with headquarters of the 30th Brigade on 19 August. Potts, with two battalions of the 21st Brigade was also moving forward but their advance was delayed at a "critical time" due to insufficient supplies at Myola. Potts assumed command of the combined force on 23 August, with orders to attack toward Kokoda and the intention of relieving the 39th Battalion in order to alleviate his supply difficulties. The Australian force he commanded amounted to 2,290.

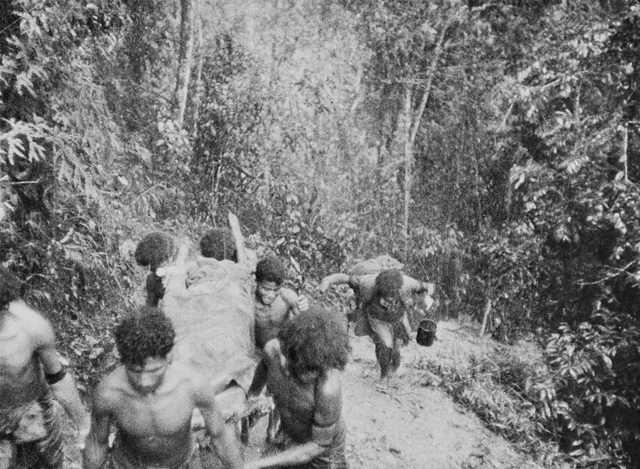
Papuan carriers evacuate Australian casualties on 30 August 1942

The position at Isurava occupied by the 39th Battalion was bounded front and rear by small creeks that ran into the gorge-like Eora Creek to the west; with a steep spur-line rising to the west. Main ridges, bounding Eora Creek ran north–south. The Isurava position and main track were on the "Isurava ridge" or western side of Eora Creek. A parallel track ran along the side of the "Abuari ridge" or western side of Eora Creek. Honner later recounted that it was: "as good a delaying position as could be found on the main track." The position was, however, overlooked by a spur-line to the north (referred to in the sources as a ridge), which afforded the Japanese a position from which they could fire down on the Australian position. The main force of the 53rd Battalion was located at Alola but tasked with security of the Abuari track on the western flank.

Forward positions and patrols on both tracks had been contacted on 26 August. The 39th Battalion positions came under artillery fire as the 2/14th Battalion was moving to occupy them. The 39th Battalion then took-up a position to their immediate rear. The 53rd Battalion was responsible for protecting the eastern flank and approach along the Abuari ridge. Through 26 and 27 August, the position there became increasingly uncertain. Forward companies of the 53rd Battalion failed to act decisively, the command party of the battalion, moving forward to take direct command was ambushed, leaving Lieutenant Colonel Kenneth Ward dead. The 2/16th Battalion was called up from near Myola to shore up the position on the eastern flank.

From 27 August, the Japanese attacks increased in intensity along both approaches. On the Abuari track, reinforcement by two companies of the 2/16th Battalion was able to stay the advance of the 2/144th Battalion on this axis. Japanese sources later noted that the defence by the 53rd and 2/16th on the right offered them "little opportunity to make a speedy exploitation", although, the Japanese commander has been criticised for not pressing his advantage there, apparently under the belief that it was more strongly held.

On the approach to Isurava, the 2/14th and 39th Battalions came under increasing pressure from Japanese attacks, culminating in hand-to-hand fighting in which Private Bruce Kingsbury was posthumously awarded the Victoria Cross. Eyewitnesses said that Kingsbury's actions had a profound effect on the Japanese, temporarily halting their momentum. His citation read, in part:

Private Kingsbury, who was one of the few survivors of a platoon which had been overrun ... immediately volunteered to join a different platoon which had been ordered to counterattack. He rushed forward, firing the Bren gun from his hip through terrific machine-gun fire, and succeeded in clearing a path through the enemy. Continuing to sweep enemy positions with his fire, and inflicting an extremely high number of casualties upon them, Private Kingsbury was then seen to fall to the ground, shot dead by the bullet from a sniper hiding in the wood.

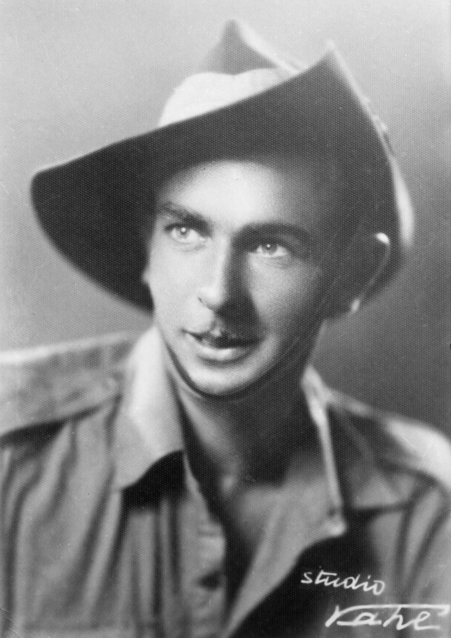
Private Bruce Steel Kingsbury VC. (AWM P01637.001)

Through this time, the Japanese were able to bring telling fire upon the Isurava position. Most accounts report this came from machine guns, [medium or heavy] mortars and artillery pieces. The account in Williams suggests that the mortars have been misidentified—attributing this instead to artillery alone. Williams reports eight artillery guns: with six artillery guns and machine gun fire falling on the rest house (later). The other two were dispersed in support of the 2/144th east of the gorge and the 1/144th in close support. The Australians were only able to reply with a single 3-inch medium mortar of the 39th Battalion that arrived on 27 August, having been brought up by the 2/14th after being airdropped at Myola.

With the western flank threatened, the Australian force at Isurava withdrew to a position at the Isurava resthouse (between Isurava and Alola) during the late hours of 29 August. On 30 August, the 3/144th attacked from the western flank and cut the route rearward to Alola. The attack was preceded by intense fire from the Japanese mountain artillery. At 3:00 pm, Potts order a withdrawal to Eora Village. Many members of Maroubra Force became separated including Lieutenant Colonel Arthur Key, who was subsequently captured and killed. In his post-operation report, Potts noted: "At no time were 2/14th and 2/16th Australian infantry battalions ever intact and available for a concerted operation, wholly and solely due to the delays occasioned by supply."

=== Eora Creek – Templeton's Crossing ===
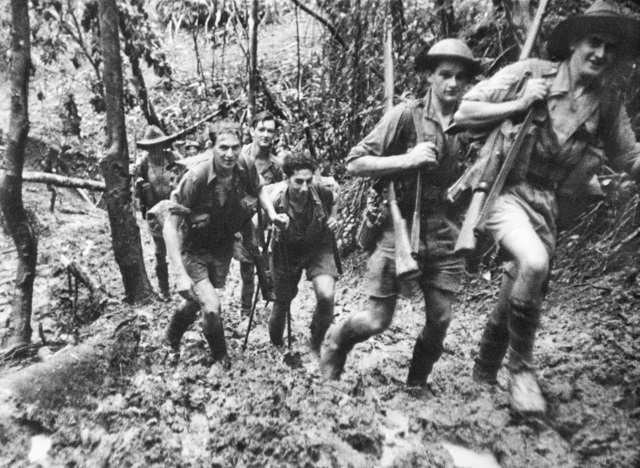
Members of the 39th Battalion withdrawing after the battle of Isurava

Disengaging from the battle at Isurava, Potts was compelled by the pursuing Japanese to conduct a fighting withdrawal. As the situation at Milne Bay stabilised, Allen released the 2/27th Battalion to join the rest of the 21st Brigade. Departing along the track on 30 August, it would take several days to reach the front and have no impact on this stage of the campaign. During the battle Horii decided to commit the 2/41st, under Major Mitsuo Koiwai, with the aim of conducting a wide arc to the west and emerging on the track to the south of Alola. They became lost, and in fact did not regain contact with the main Japanese force until after the battle, without firing a single shot. Horii now assigned the battalion to the vanguard to pursue the withdrawing Maroubra Force.

In the initial withdrawal, the 2/16th Battalion had a screening role, withdrawing by stages from the rear of Alola toward Eora Village, while the village itself was held by what remained of the 39th Battalion. As most of Maroubra Force had withdrawn through their positions, the 2/16th Battalion then retired on Eora Village, arriving about midday 1 September. It then took up a defensive position on a bald spur on the southern side of the creek that overlooked the crossing and village. The 2/14th Battalion was about 1 kilometre (1,100 yd) south along the track. The 39th Battalion, by then numbering less than 150, was ordered to proceed to Kagi and hold there. It remained forward until it was withdrawn on 5 September. On the morning of 31 August, the 53rd Battalion was sent out of battle and ordered to return to Myola, where part of the battalion remained, providing work parties.

Commencing with Eora Village, the 2/16th Battalion occupied delaying positions along the track: withdrawing from Eora Village at 6:00 am on 2 September; to a position forward of Templeton's Crossing until dusk of 2 September; and, a position overlooking Dump 1 (on Eora Creek about 2.5 kilometres (1.6 mi) south of Templeton's crossing), until the night of 4 September. At each stage, the 2/14th Battalion screened the withdrawal of the 2/16th Battalion.

Potts was, with this final engagement, able to make a clean break from the Japanese advance but only with the loss of Myola—the terrain afforded the Japanese too great an advantage and it could be bypassed, using the original track to the west. Potts abandoned Myola, destroying what supplies could not be carried out. It has been credited as a successful rearguard action for the Australians. (Note: Moremon 2000, pp. 191–192 observes that the withdrawal was constrained by the rate at which casualties could be evacuated, particularly given that the Japanese were known to kill any that might fall into their hands. This dictated that the withdrawal was fought by relatively short bounds where longer bounds might otherwise have been preferable and allowed for a clean break to have been made earlier.)

=== Battle of Brigade Hill ===
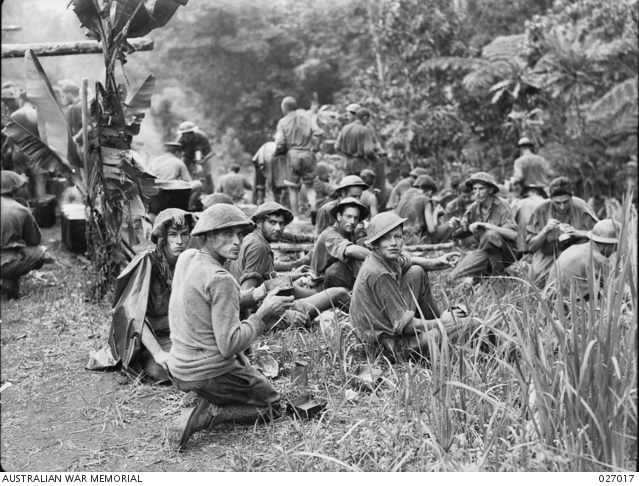
Men of the 2/27th Battalion returned to the Australian lines at Itiki after being isolated during the Battle of Brigade Hill–Mission Ridge. (AWM027017)

Under mounting pressure from Allen and Rowell to make a stand, Potts determined to do so at Mission Ridge, which ran northward from Brigade Hill toward the village of Efogi. Lieutenant Colonel Geoffrey Cooper, commanding the 2/27th Battalion had reached as far as Kagi with the leading companies on 4 September. Cooper then concentrated his battalion in position just south of Efogi, where he could screen the brigade before he was recalled back to the position of the main force during the afternoon of 6 September. The 2/27th occupied a forward position astride the track. The 2/14th Battalion was to its immediate rear and slightly to the east. Brigade headquarters was approximately 1,800 metres (2,000 yd) to the rear. (Note: Determined from map (Anderson 2014, p. 90).) The main force of the 2/16 Battalion was between brigade headquarters and the forward battalions, while its D Company was located with brigade headquarters as rear protection.

Horii had become dissatisfied with the rate of advance made with the 41st Regiment in the vanguard and replaced it with 144th Regiment from 5 September. Colonel Kusonose Masao employed his 2nd and 3rd Battalions in the attack. As the Japanese moved into position through the night of 6 September, Australians observed lights which Anderson describes as a "lantern parade". An airstrike was called for the following morning with eight B–26 Marauders and four P–40s as escorts, bombing and strafing. Anderson reports that it had a greater effect on the morale; positive and negative of the Australians and Japanese respectively, than it did in causing casualties.

During 7 September, the 3/144th Battalion probed toward the position of the 2/27th Battalion, with Japanese artillery and machine guns firing upon the forward Australian battalions. The 21st Brigade was only able to direct fire from a section of three mortars under command of the brigade. At 5:00 pm, the brigade war diary reports the 2/27th Battalion being "hammered by mortars, QF gun and HMG".

During the night, the 2/144th Battalion conducted an undetected enveloping move to the west and attacked up the ridge just before dawn to join the track between brigade headquarters and the forward battalions. At much the same time, the 3/144th Battalion launched an intense attack against the 2/27th Battalion. In the fighting that developed, the 2/27th Battalion drew back on the 2/14th Battalion's position while the 2/16th and 2/14th Battalions counterattacked south. Brigade headquarters (and D Company of the 2/16th Battalion) also attacked north to try to dislodge the incursion of the Japanese 2/144th Battalion without success.

Immediately before communication forward broke down, Potts passed command of the brigade group to Caro. As the situation deteriorated, the headquarters group withdrew to Nauro. The 2/14th and 2/16th Battalions broke track to the east and were able to rejoin the brigade. The 2/27th Battalion, however, were unable to follow and were considered effectively lost until they emerged from the jungle three weeks later. The battle at Brigade Hill – Mission Ridge has been described as a "stunning victory" for the Japanese and a "catastrophe" for the Australians.

=== Ioribaiwa and Imita Ridge ===
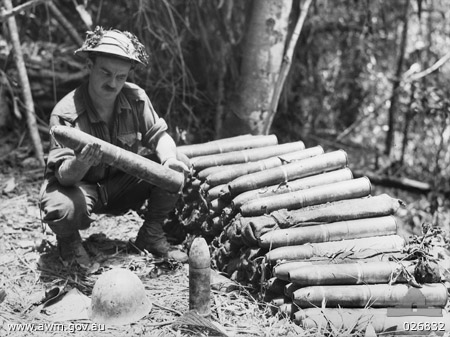
An Australian soldier inspects Japanese artillery rounds abandoned at Ioribaiwa. These rounds had been carried the length of the track by Japanese soldiers.

Even before the battle at Mission Ridge had concluded, Rowell had issued orders recalling Potts to Port Moresby. What remained of the 2/14th and 2/16th Battalions rejoined the 21st Brigade and withdrew southwards towards Ioribaiwa and harassed the Japanese advance. Porter, having orders to stabilise the position, took command of Maroubra Force on 10 September. By this time, the 2/14th and 2/16th Battalion were so reduced in strength that they were formed into a combined force fielding a company strength from each. It was reinforced by the 3rd Battalion and by the 2/1st Pioneer Battalion, although the latter did not move forward. The 25th Brigade under Eather was being sent forward to relieve the situation. As he prepared to attack, Eather assumed command of Maroubra Force. (Note: Williams 2012, p. 143, clarifies Eather's status as commander of Maroubra force: "Although Eather was not officially placed in command of Maroubra Force until 17 September, he exercised command at Ioribaiwa under the instructions of his divisional commander, Major General Arthur Allen, and with the compliance of Porter. Having consulted Porter, already on the ridge, Eather decided to leave Porter blocking the track while using his own brigade to swing around both flanks...")

Porter had positioned the composite battalion astride the track on the Ioribaiwa ridgeline, running from the main range to the northwest. The track followed a spur-line falling north toward Ofi Creek. The 3rd Battalion was positioned on the ridge to its immediate right on the eastern side of the track. It was the major ridgeline before Imita Ridge and the head of the track. Eather planned to attack, advancing past Porters' flanks with two of his battalions—the 2/31st Battalion on the western flank and the 2/33rd Battalion on the eastern flank. The 2/25th Battalion was his reserve. It took up a position on the track behind Porter's force. On the night 13–14 September, the 25th Brigade bivouacked to the rear of Porter's force ready to advance. As Eather's battalions were deploying, the Japanese attacked. Eather immediately called off the attack and adopted a defensive posture. This had the effect of placing his advancing battalions on either flank and significantly increasing his frontage.

From Brigade Hill, Kusonose had continued to pursue the Australians with the 2nd/144th and 3rd/144th Battalions. Horii had halted his main force awaiting permission to continue the advance. Kusonose's initial attack was made with half of the 3rd/144th Battalion advancing along the axis of the track, while the 2nd/144th Battalion was to make a flanking attack from the west. Kusonose was able to bring fire on the Australian positions from eight guns. Fighting continued through the day but both attacks had been held. An attack on 15 September was made by his reserve, the second half of the 3rd/144th Battalion against what he thought was the eastern flank of the Australian force. Unaware that Maroubra Force had been reinforced, this lodged in a gap between the Australian 3rd Battalion and the 2/33rd Battalion. Counter attacks by two companies of the 2/25th and two companies of the 2/33rd Battalion that day were unable to dislodge the Japanese from this foothold. (Note: A Company of the 2/33rd Battalion was initially tasked to attack but found the terrain too difficult. D Company was then committed.)

Fighting on 16 September continued much as it had on the previous day, although the Japanese lodged between the 3rd Battalion and the 2/33rd Battalion took to the high-ground—Sankaku Yama (Triangle Mountain). From there, they compromised Eather's communication with the 2/33rd Battalion. Feeling his position was vulnerable, he requested and received permission from Allen to withdraw back to Imita Ridge, with Allen stressing that there could be no further withdrawal. Eather commenced the withdrawal from 11:00 am, which Anderson describes as, "well-organised and orderly".

Eather has been criticised, particularly by the author, Williams, for disengaging from battle too soon and ceding victory to Kusonose when the latter was at an impasse and frustrated. Having committed his reserve, Kusonose was still unable to break the Australian defence.

== Interlude – Imita Ridge ==
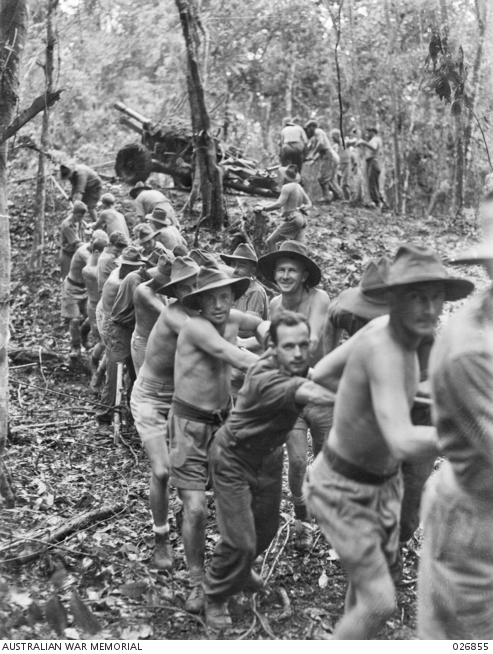
A 25-pounder gun of the 14th Field Regiment being pulled into position near Uberi. (AWM026855)

On 17 September, Eather was able to consolidate his position on Imita Ridge. The 2/33rd Battalion had been tasked to delay any further Japanese advance. A number of ambushes were set with mixed results. The Australian position, near the head of the track substantially resolved the difficulty of supply and the force was soon to be bolstered by the arrival of the 16th Brigade. Two 25-pounder guns of the 14th Field Regiment would at last be able to provide artillery support to Maroubra Force.

As the Japanese had advanced from Brigade Hill, a programme of patrolling was instigated to secure the flank approaches to Port Moresby. This utilised the 2/6th Independent Company extensively to patrol from Laloki along the Goldie River toward Ioribaiwa and for other tasks. Jawforce was raised from rear details of the 21st Brigade to patrol the eastern flank and approach from Nauro to Jawarere. Honner Force was raised with orders to attack Japanese supply lines between Nauro and Menari. Though the conceived plan came to nought through supply difficulties, it patrolled the western flank to the limit of its supply without encounter. (Note: Part of this responsibility fell to the 6th Division which, at about this time consisted of the 21st and 30th Brigades, the 2/6th Independent Company and the newly arrived US 128th Regiment.)

Upon reaching Ioribaiwa, the lead Japanese elements began to celebrate—from their vantage point on the hills around Ioribaiwa, the Japanese soldiers could see the lights of Port Moresby and the Coral Sea beyond. They made no concerted attempt to advance on Eather's position at Imita Ridge.

In this interlude, Eather patrolled toward Ioribaiwa, both to harass the Japanese and to gather intelligence on their disposition. By 27 September, he issued orders to his battalion commanders for an "all-out" assault the following day. The attack found that Ioribaiwa had been abandoned and the artillery fired by the Australians had been without effect. Patrols followed up immediately, with one of the 2/25th Battalion finding that by 30 September, Nauro was unoccupied. Ordered to withdraw, the position at Ioribaiwa had been abandoned by the last Japanese troops during the night of 26 September.

== Second phase – Australian counter-offensive ==
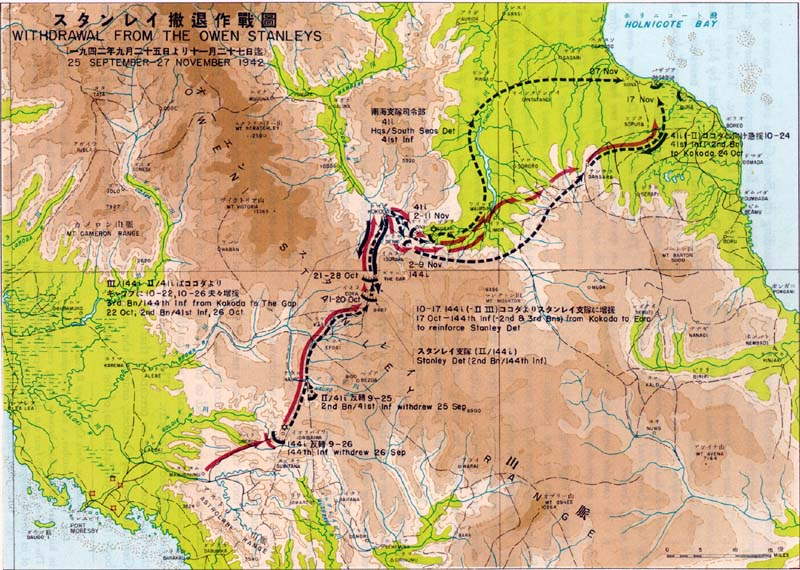
The Japanese withdrawal along the Kokoda Track

The 25th Brigade, to which the 3rd Battalion was attached, commenced its advance against the Japanese and the 16th Brigade followed to occupy the positions on Imita Ridge. Allen was conscious of the supply difficulties he would encounter and moderated his advance accordingly but was pressured by Blamey and MacArthur to pursue what they perceived to be a fleeing enemy. In fact though, Horii's force had made a clean break and withdrawn back to a series of four defensive positions prepared in advance. These were the responsibility of the Stanley Detachment, which was based on the 2/144th Battalion. The first two positions were forward near the northern ends of the two tracks north from Kagi—the main Myola track and the original track, also known as the Mount Bellamy Track. The third position overlooked Templeton's Crossing, where the two tracks rejoined. The fourth position was at Eora Village.

=== Second Battle of Eora Creek – Templeton's Crossing ===
On 10 October, Myola was reoccupied by the Australians. By 12 October, the 2/33rd Battalion was advancing toward Templeton's Crossing on the Myola Track and the 2/25th Battalion on the Mount Bellamy Track. The 16th Brigade was advancing on Menari to take up a position at Myola with the intention of taking the vanguard as the brigade moved through Templeton's Crossing.

==== Australian advance to contact ====
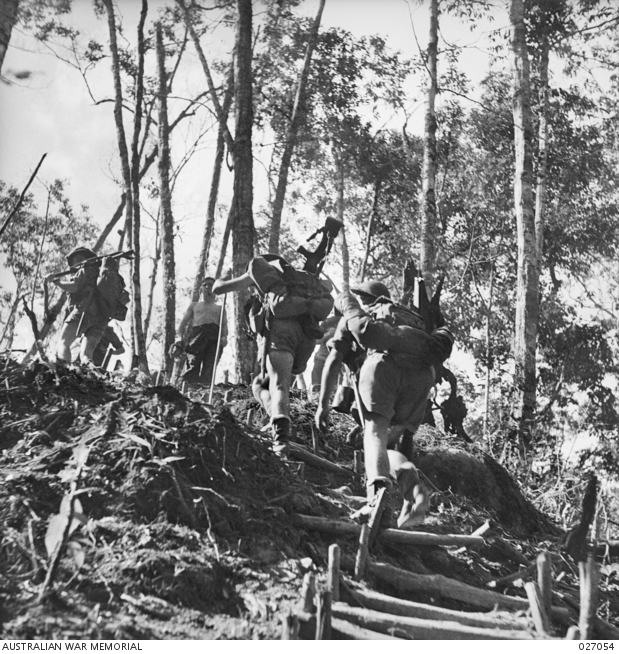
Members of the 16th Brigade moving forward along the track. (AWM027054)

On the Myola track, the Stanley Detachment had deployed its main force in-line along the track in considerable depth and in well developed positions. A forward patrol of the 2/33rd Battalion contacted the most lightly held forward position on 10 October. The positions resisted a series of frontal and flanking manoeuvres. Through 14 October, the 3rd Battalion moved around the western flank to co-ordinate with the 2/33rd Battalion in an attack on 15 October. However, the attack found that the Japanese had already withdrawn.

On the Mount Bellamy Track, the 2/25th Battalion met with the lesser Japanese force on 13 October and, after reporting the Japanese positions clear on 15 October, patrolled to Templeton's Crossing the following day. These two engagements have subsequently been identified as the opening phase of the Second Battle of Templeton's Crossing – Eora Creek.

==== Templeton's Crossing ====
The battalions of the 25th Brigade (less the 2/31st Battalion further back) reached the northern confluence of the tracks at Templeton's Crossing on 16 October. As the 3rd Battalion advanced, the Japanese position was identified in the late afternoon. It straddled the track on the high ground to the east of Eora Creek and 450 metres (500 yd) north of the crossing. The Stanley detachment had occupied two parallel spurs running toward the creek from the main ridgeline. Cameron, now commanding the 3rd Battalion, concentrated his force for an attack on the morrow. Attacks on 17 and 18 October were directed from the high ground on the Japanese eastern flank by the 3rd Battalion and A and D Companies of the 2/25th Battalion but failed to achieve a decisive outcome.

During the morning of 19 October, the 2/2nd Battalion under Lieutenant Colonel Cedric Edgar pushed forward to assist the 3rd Battalion, while the remaining two battalions of the 16th Brigade, under the command of Brigadier John Lloyd relieved the 2/25th and 2/33rd Battalions. On 20 October, the 2/2nd Battalion mounted an attack employing four companies from the high-ground to the east. This attack was to be renewed the following day, 21 October, but the Stanley Detachment had withdrawn in the night. Horii's main force had been withdrawn to Kokoda–Oivi. When the Stanley Detachment was forced to withdraw from Templeton's Crossing, he sent all available reinforcement to man the final position at Eora Village.

==== Eora Village ====
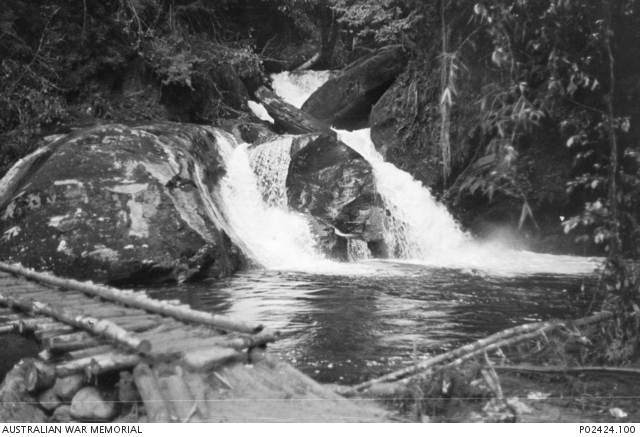
A log bridge on the track – first crossing of Eora Creek north of Myola. (AWM P02424.100)

The Australian advance then began toward Eora Village. As a patrol entered Eora Village at about 10:30 am, it was fired upon. From the village, the track crossed log bridges over Eora Creek and a tributary before following along the western side of Eora Creek as it headed northward. Overlooking the village from the north was a spur-line rising to the west. It was here that the Japanese had prepared two defensive positions – one on the lower slopes of the spur and another much higher up. Anderson reports that the Japanese had spent nearly two months in fortifying the position. From these, they could bring fire from medium machine guns and five artillery pieces. (Note: Of note, battle maps provided by McCarthy indicate heavy mortars and a mountain gun.)

On the afternoon of 22 October, against the advice of his battalion commanders, (Note: They favoured an attack from the west, down onto the position, as had been used to break the position at Templeton's Crossing.) Lloyd ordered a frontal attack on the lower Japanese position, which begain shortly thereafter. Anderson describes what followed as very confused but dawn of 24 October found the attacking force of battalion strength largely pinned down in front of the Japanese position, with 34 killed, many more injured, and no prospect of success. Lloyd then ordered the 2/3rd Battalion under Lieutenant Colonel John Stevenson to attack the Japanese positions from the top of Eora Ridge (to the west, and above both Japanese positions), but deploying to the forming-up point took two days.

The attack of the 2/3rd Battalion commenced in the morning of 27 October. Horii had ordered a withdrawal from the position on the night of 28 October. The 2/3rd Battalion resumed its attack on 28 October, co-ordinated with the remainder of the brigade. The position was now only lightly held by the 3rd/144th, which was about to withdraw, and the situation turned into a rout.

=== Occupation of Kokoda ===
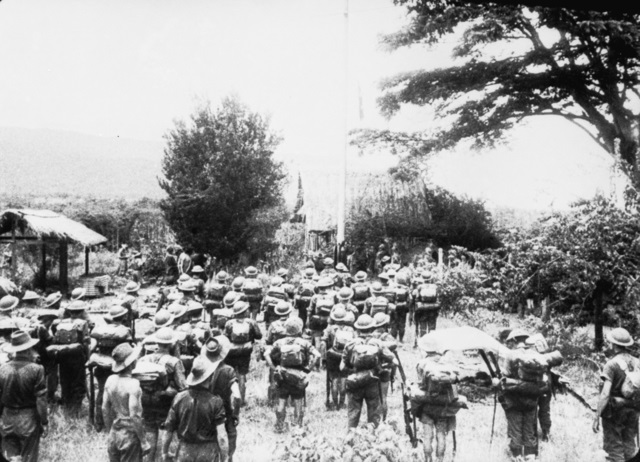
Flag-raising ceremony after the capture of Kokoda. (AWM013572)

On 28 October, Vasey arrived at Myola to relieve Allen. The Australian advance recommenced on 29 October. With a loss of positions that commanded the Gap and the approach to Port Moresby, Horii turned his attention to defending the beachheads at Buna–Gona. He concentrated his force around Oivi and Gorari. While a rearguard force screened his preparations, this was successively withdrawn without contact being made.

Aola was entered on 30 October and airdrops the following day alleviated supply problems as the Australian line-of-communication extended from Myola. On 2 November, a patrol of the 2/31st Battalion entered Kokoda and found that it had been abandoned. (Note: On 25 October, a patrol of the 2/6th Independent Company under Lieutenant Frederick Winkle entered Kokoda and withdrew when eventually fired upon.) At 3:30 pm the following day, Vasey led a flag-raising ceremony with hundreds present. The 7th Division could now land supplies at Kokoda. On 6 November, Vasey held a further ceremony in which he awarded medals and made gifts of trade-goods to the Papuans that had supported the Australians.

=== Battle of Oivi–Gorari ===
From Kokoda, the route to Wairopi, and then, to Buna–Gona, was mainly easterly, whereas the advance from Eora Village was mainly to the north. On the main track from Kokoda to Wairopi (at the crossing of the Kumusi River) Horii had constructed strong defensive positions, prepared several weeks before. These were centred on the heights overlooking Oivi, with a position in depth at Gorari, which also covered an approach from the southern parallel track. The 41st Regiment, with a battalion of the 144th Regiment and seven artillery pieces faced an advance from the west. Two battalions of the 144th Regiment held the position at Gorari and a track approaching from the south. The force headquarters was to the immediate rear.

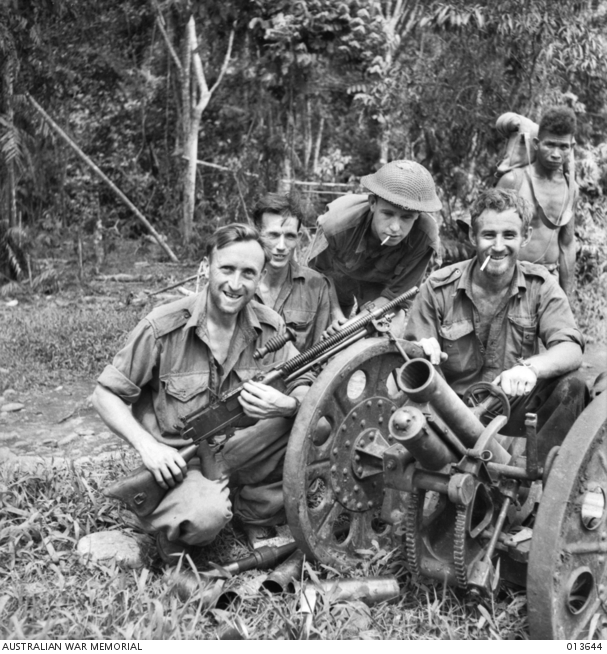
A 70 mm infantry gun captured during the fight at Oivi–Gorari. (AWM013644)

The 16th Brigade (including the 3rd Battalion) patrolled toward Oivi, making contact on 4 November. In fighting that continued until 6 November, it tried unsuccessfully to break the position. Vasey then committed the 25th Brigade, with the 2/1st Battalion attached, to an attack from the south toward Gorari. The brigade was to advance along the southern parallel track as far as Waju. The 2/1st Battalion leading, initially overshot this and had to retrace its steps but was ready to advance north on 7 November. Horii had become aware of the Australian movement and dispatched his two battalions at Gorari south along the connecting track. They established an all-round defence on a position near Baribe, about halfway between the two parallel tracks. Horii also called the 1st/144th back from Oivi to occupy the position left vacant at Goari.

On 8 November, Eather contacted the position at Baribe, enveloping it with the 2/25th and 2/31st Battalions. On 9 November, the 2/33rd and 2/1st Battalions pushed around the Japanese position on the connecting track and advanced on Gorari, where they attacked the 1/144th Battalion and Horii's headquarters. Bombing and strafing attacks were also conducted against the Japanese positions near Oivi. By 10 November, Horii ordered a withdrawal but the situation for the Japanese had degenerated into a rout. Fighting had largely ceased by midday 11 November. The Japanese lost around 430 killed, around 400 wounded and abandoned fifteen artillery pieces among other material.

== Advance on Buna–Gona ==
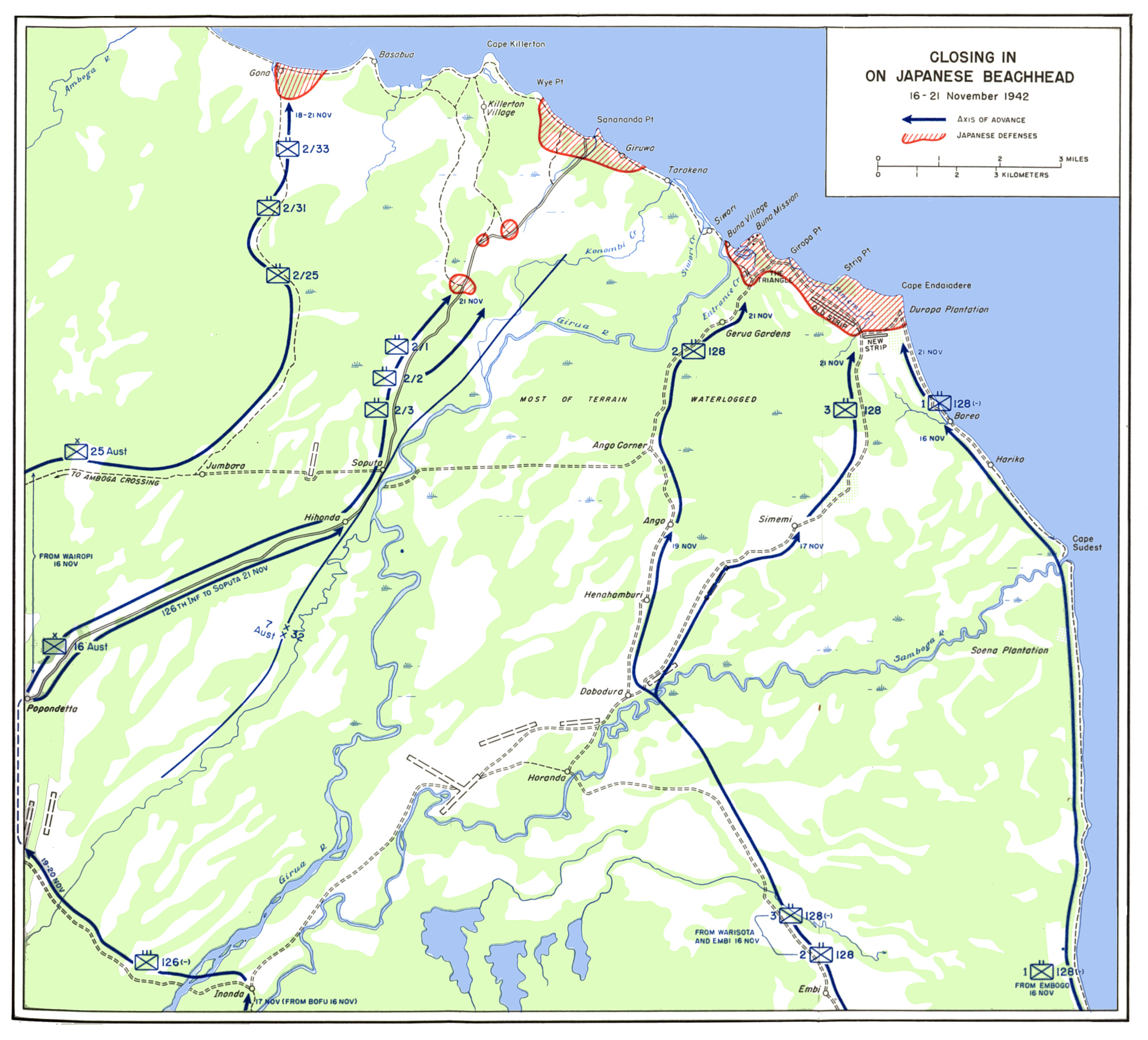
Closing in on the Japanese beachhead, 16–21 November 1942

Most of the Japanese force withdrew to the Kumusi River and 1,200 are estimated to have made the crossing of the flooded river. Horii was swept downstream and later drowned. Others followed the river downstream to the coast. Milner reports the strength gathered there as 900, under command of Colonel Yazawa. The 25th Brigade contacted the Japanese rearguard near Wairopi on 12 November but these withdrew in the night. While most of Vasey's force was rested, patrols continued to search out Japanese survivors and engineers were dealing with the problem of establishing a bridgehead. The crossing of the two brigades was completed on the morning of 16 November and they began their advance on the Japanese beachheads. The 25th Brigade took the track toward Gona while the 16th Brigade advanced along the track toward Sanananda. Elements of the US 32nd Division were advancing on Buna by a coastal route from the southeast.

=== Flanking move by US 32nd Division ===
The US 32nd Division had arrived in Australia in May. With few US forces to choose from, General Douglas MacArthur ordered the divisional headquarters and two regimental combat teams from the 126th and 128th infantry regiments to deploy to Port Moresby. They arrived between 15 and 28 September 1942. On 11 September, MacArthur added a plan for the 126th Infantry Regiment to conduct a wide flanking move to the east with the goal to engage the Japanese rear near Wairopi. The 2nd Battalion 126th Regiment, with supporting elements attached, was tasked with traversing the track from Kapa Kapa to Jaure. From Jaure, at the headwaters of the Kumusi River, the force was to advance toward Wairopi. The little-used track from Kapa Kapa to Jaure was 137 kilometres (85 mi) long.

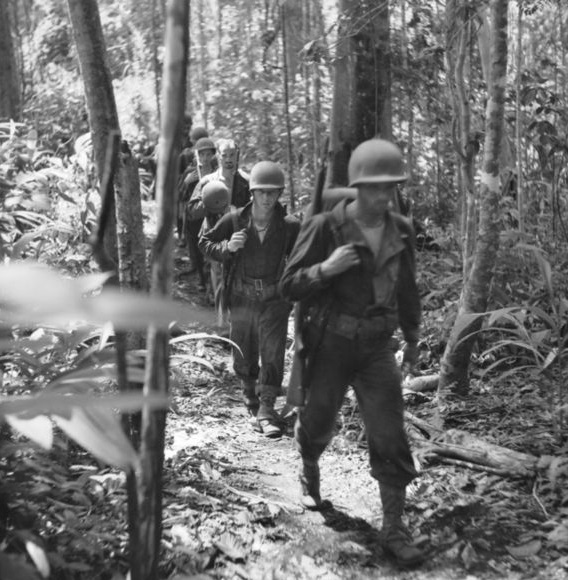
Soldiers of the 128th Inf Regt on the move at Wanigela as they head towards Buna.

The 32nd established a position at Kalikodobu, nicknamed "Kalamazoo" by the GIs, a short distance along the track. From here, the main body of the 2nd Battalion departed on 14 October 1942. The battalion had assembled at Jaure by 28 October. The Americans were utterly unprepared for the extremely harsh conditions they faced which significantly delayed their advance.

The planned envelopment of the Japanese forces never took place due to both the slow rate of the American advance and the unexpected, rapid withdrawal of the Japanese forces. While the 2/126th crawled over the Kapa Kapa Track, the balance of the 32nd Division was flown to newly developed advance airfields on the north side of the island. The 128th Regiment was flown to the most forward of these, located at Wanigella. From there, troops moved overland toward Buna or were ferried part of the way in coastal vessels, to meetup with Australian forces advancing on the Japanese beachheads. The first units of the 2/126th arrived in Soputa on 20 November 1942.

A similar proposal for attacking the Japanese rear near Wairopi was made by Brigadier Potts, following withdrawal of the 21st Brigade after Ioribaiwa. Chaforce, raised from battalions of the 21st Brigade (each contributing a company) was to be assigned the task of penetrating from Myola into the Kumusi River valley. With initial approval to advance to Myola, the operation was subsequently cancelled sometime shortly after 18 October 1942.

== Aftermath ==
=== Subsequent events ===
The Japanese at Buna–Gona were reinforced by fresh units from Rabaul. The joint Australian–United States Army operation faced a formidable defence that had been prepared well in advance of their arrival and the battle lasted until 22 January 1943. The 39th Battalion participated in the fighting at the beachheads and, following its withdrawal, was only able to parade about 30 members – its ranks having been greatly depleted by injury and illness. In March 1943 it was withdrawn back to Australia where it was disbanded in July 1943.

While this campaign, Milne Bay and the sea battles of Coral Sea and Midway ended the threat to Australia, the Australian government continued to warn the citizenry until mid-1943, that an invasion was possible. Allied operations against Japanese forces in New Guinea, including Operation Cartwheel and the Salamaua–Lae campaign, continued into 1945.

=== Strengths and casualties ===
A total of 13,500 Japanese were ultimately landed in Papua for the fighting during the campaign. Of these, about 6,000 or two regiments, were directly involved in the "forward areas" along the Track. Against this, the Allies assembled approximately 30,000 troops in New Guinea, (Note: A figure quoted by Blamey to the Australian Advisory War Council on 17 September 1942 and cited by McCarthy 1959, p. 234. This figure was for the defence of the Australian territories and not just concentrated to defend against the advance from Kokoda.) although at any one time no more than one infantry brigade, or approximately 3,500 troops, were involved in the fighting for most of the campaign. In terms of total troops committed over the course of the campaign, author Peter Williams estimates that "more than twice as many Australians than Japanese fought on the Kokoda Track".

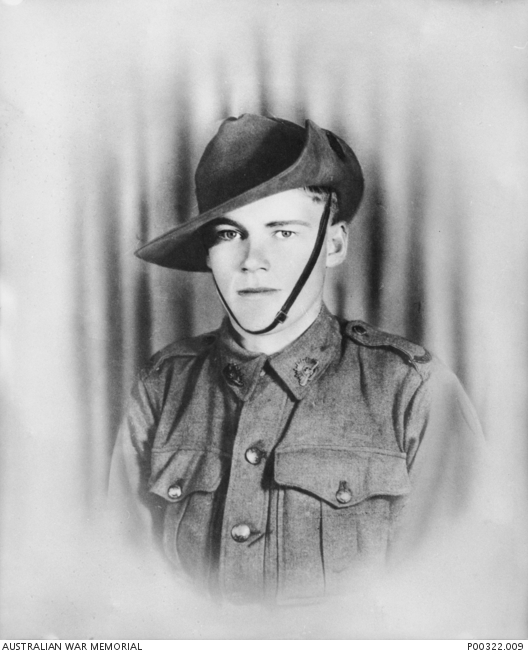
Private Vasil (Basil) Albert 'Babe' Lucas initially enlisted on 20 June 1940, aged 15 and was killed in action on 25 November 1942. (Note: Private Vasil (Basil) Albert 'Babe' Lucas enlisted on 20 June 1940, aged 15, with the service number NX33033. Pte Lucas had put his age up to enlist. He was discharged on 17 November 1940 and re-enlisted on 4 April 1941 in 2/3 Battalion. He served in Syria, Bardia and Tobruk and later in New Guinea on the Kokoda Track. He was killed in action on 25 November 1942 after an advanced dressing station to which he had been admitted with scrub typhus was strafed by Japanese aircraft. He was one of nine brothers from the Lucas family who enlisted from the Bega district. Many of the brothers had multiple enlistments and some enlisted together and served together for periods of time.) (AWM P00322.009)

Casualties amongst the Australians between 22 July and 16 November 1942 were 39 officers and 586 men killed and a further 64 officers and 991 men wounded, for a total of 625 killed and 1,055 wounded. Notably, three battalion commanders were killed or captured in the first month of fighting. (Note: These were: Owen, of the 39th Battalion; Ward, of the 53rd Battalion; and, Key, of the 2/14th Battalion who was captured and subsequently executed.) Non-battle, or sickness, casualties are not accurately recorded but are stated to have been about two to three times the battle casualty figure. The exact number of Japanese casualties is not known, although Williams estimates battle casualties at 2,050 between the initial fighting around Awala and the final battle at Oivi–Gorari. Non-battle casualties, however, increase this figure and it is estimated that of the 6,000 troops, or five infantry battalions, that were committed to the fighting, up to 75% became casualties, being either killed, wounded or becoming ill.

=== War crimes ===
During the Tokyo War Crimes trial after the war, there was not enough evidence to charge Japanese servicemen with acts of cannibalism. Some Japanese soldiers were tried and convicted in Australian-run military courts held in New Guinea. The Japanese were also responsible for the torture and execution of both combatant and non-combatant personnel including two female missionaries, May Hayman and Mavis Parkinson, during the campaign. Though not limited to the early stages of the campaign, McCarthy recounts events in the initial phase of the Kokoda campaign. All of the Australian servicemen captured during the course of the campaign were executed.

Australian troops also treated their opponents harshly. Most adopted a "no quarter" attitude and summarily executed Japanese military personnel during the infrequent occasions where they attempted to surrender. Despite official instructions against doing so, Australian servicemen often looted and mutilated Japanese corpses, on several instances taking gold teeth from them. These attitudes and actions were motivated by a variety of factors, including a view that the Japanese were deceitful, a desire to exact revenge for atrocities against Australian military personnel and widespread racism.

=== Nomenclature ===
There is some debate as to whether the correct name for the route over the range is the "Kokoda Track" or "Kokoda Trail". The battle honour awarded for the campaign, as determined by the Battlefields Nomenclature Committee, is "Kokoda Trail". The Australian War Memorial has adopted "Trail", largely for this reason.

Despite the historical use of "Trail", "Track" gained dominance in the 1990s, with the Australian Macquarie Dictionary stating that while both versions were in use, Kokoda Track "appears to be the more popular of the two". (Note: In his 2009 study, James reviews the issue in detail and concludes no definitive historical basis for preferring one over the other.)

==== Battle honours ====
For eligible Australian units, the battle honour "Kokoda Trail" was bestowed. Seven subsidiary honours were also bestowed. The honour, "Kokoda–Deniki" was awarded to the 39th Battalion and the Pacific Islands Regiment, which succeeded the PIB. The honour, "Efogi–Menari" was awarded for engagements between 6–9 September and included the battle at Brigade Hill–Mission Ridge. Other honours were: "Isurava", "Eora Creek–Templeton's Crossing I", "Ioribaiwa", "Eora Creek–Templeton's Crossing II" and "Oivi–Gorari". The 53rd Battalion did not receive any battle honour for the fighting during the Kokoda Track campaign.

=== Significance of the campaign ===
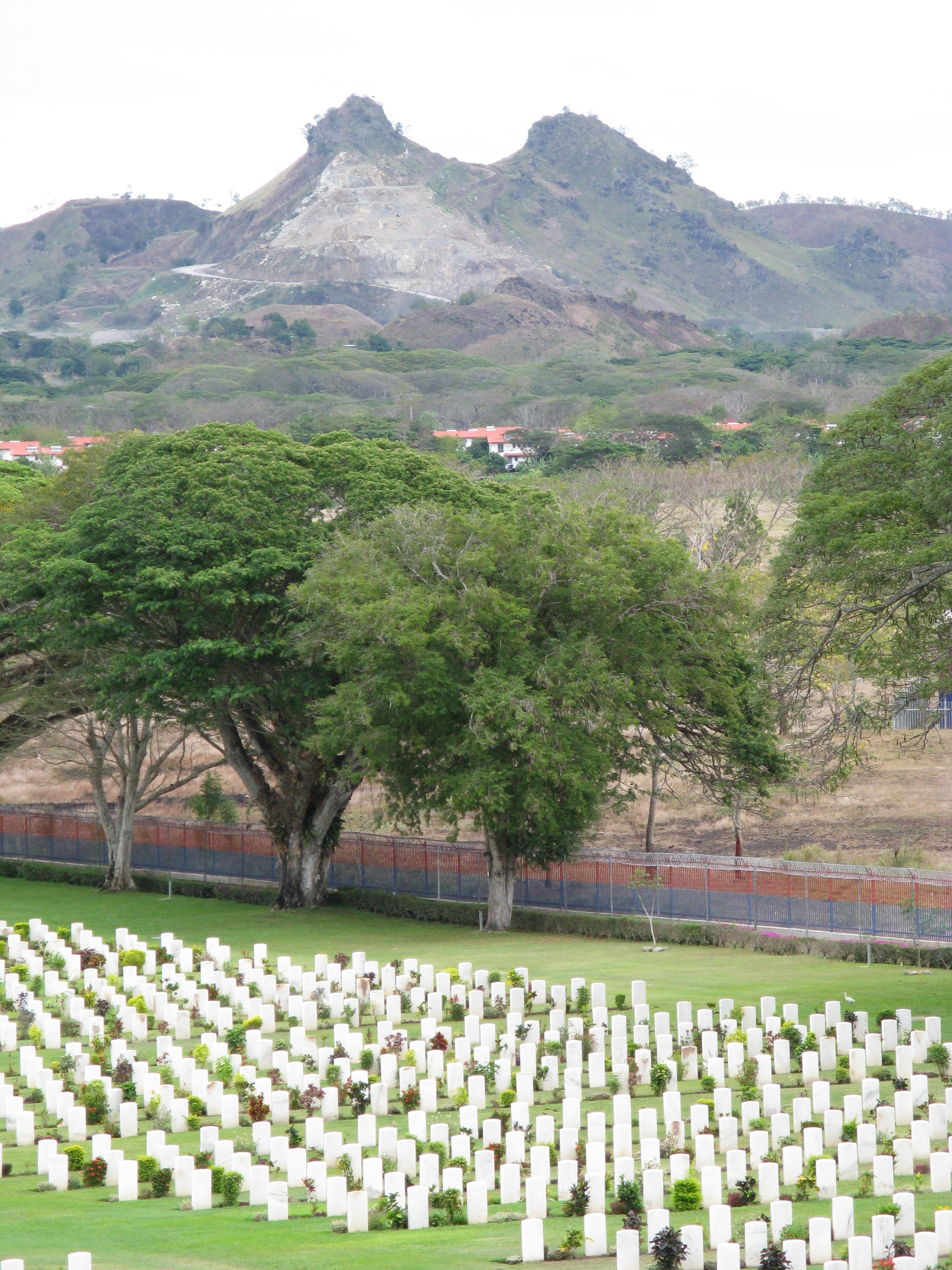
Bomana War Cemetery, near Port Moresby, where Australians killed in the campaign have been buried

While the Gallipoli Campaign of World War I was Australia's first military test as a new nation, the fighting during the Kokoda campaign represents the first time in the nation's history that its security was directly threatened. The 1942 newsreel documentary, Kokoda Front Line! documented the Australian fighting during the campaign and brought the war home for many Australians. Filmed by Damien Parer, it won an Oscar for the documentary category – the first time an Australian film/documentary was awarded an Oscar. (Note: It was shared with three other winners.) Curator, Poppy De Souza, observes: "This iconic newsreel contains some of the most recognised images of Australian troops in the Second World War, images that have contributed to the collective visual memory of the events at Kokoda. ...[quoting Parer] a war that seemed until this point 'a million miles away'". Although it has since become accepted that an invasion of Australia was not possible, or even planned by the Japanese, at the time there was a very real belief within Australia that this was possible and as such the Kokoda campaign has come to be viewed by some as the battle that "saved Australia". As a result, within the collective Australian psyche, the campaign and particularly the role of the 39th Battalion has become a key part of modern notions of the Anzac legend. Indeed, the Battle of Isurava has been described as "Australia's Thermopylae", although the key premise of this comparison—the idea that the Australians were outnumbered—has since been shown to be inaccurate.

Nevertheless, the Allied campaign was hampered by the poor intelligence available, which included antiquated maps, unfamiliarity with the terrain, and limited aerial photography. Senior military commanders including MacArthur and Blamey were unaware of the extraordinarily difficult terrain and the extreme conditions in which the battles would be fought, and orders given to the commanders were sometimes unrealistic given the conditions on the ground. In the end though, the strategy used against the Japanese in Papua—widely criticised at the time—led to an eventual, though costly, victory. The American official historian Samuel Milner judged that "the only result, strategically speaking" of the Kokoda track campaign and subsequent fighting in Papua "was that after six months of bitter fighting and some 8,500 casualties, including 3,000 dead, the South West Pacific Area was exactly where it would have been the previous July had it been able to secure the beachhead before the Japanese got there". More recently, Australian historian Nicholas Anderson has concluded that while the Kokoda Track was a significant Allied victory, it was less important to the outcome of the Pacific War than the defeat of the main Japanese effort at this time during the Guadalcanal Campaign.

The campaign also served to highlight the strengths and weaknesses of the individual soldiers and the lower level commanders. Following this and the fighting that followed at Buna–Gona, the American and Australian armies would take steps to improve individual and unit training and medical and logistic infrastructure would also be greatly improved, with an increased focus upon air transport to solve the supply problem. Within the Australian Army, there was a major restructure with the formation of Jungle divisions which addressed manpower issues and were more suited to operations in jungle environments. There was a significant reduction in the scale of motor transport, and Jeeps, with greater cross-country mobility, were employed rather than trucks. At battalion level, changes included increasing the number of mortars to eight, the addition of a machine gun platoon with four Vickers guns to enhance organic fire support, and a removal of the carrier platoon. The Land Warfare Centre, as it is now known, was established at Canungra, Queensland, with an emphasis on training for jungle warfare. Adrian Threlfall, in his thesis and subsequent book explores the challenges faced and how these shaped the Australian Army as a jungle warfare force.

== See also ==
- Kokoda Track Memorial Walkway
- The Kokoda Challenge

== Bibliography ==
- Allan, Jack; Cutts, Chris (1994). As It Seemed To Us: The 1st Australian Mountain Battery, RAA, AIF. Brisbane, Queensland: AEbis. ISBN 978-0-646-17515-7.
- Anderson, Nicholas (2014). To Kokoda. Australian Army Campaigns Series – 14. Sydney, New South Wales: Big Sky Publishing. ISBN 978-1-922132-95-6.
- Australia-Japan Research Project (2007). Japanese Army Operations in the South Pacific Area: New Britain and Papua Campaigns, 1942–43. Translated by Bullard, Steven. Canberra: Australian War Memorial. ISBN 978-0-9751904-8-7.
- Blakeley, Herbert (1957). The 32nd Infantry Division in World War II. Maison, Wisconsin: Thirty-Second Infantry Division History Commission. OCLC 3465460.
- Brune, Peter (2003). A Bastard of a Place: The Australians in Papua. Crows Nest, New South Wales: Allen & Unwin. ISBN 1-74114-403-5.
- Coates, John (2006). An Atlas of Australia's Wars. Melbourne: Oxford University Press. ISBN 0-19-555914-2.
- Collie, Craig; Marutani, Hajime (2009). The Path of Infinite Sorrow: The Japanese on the Kokoda Track. Crows Nest, New South Wales: Allen & Unwin. ISBN 978-1-74175-839-9.
- Coulthard-Clark, Chris (1998). The Encyclopaedia of Australia's Battles. Sydney: Allen & Unwin. ISBN 1-86448-611-2.
- Craven, Wesley; Cate, James (1948). Army Air Forces in World War II, Volume 1: Plans and Early Operations—January 1938 to August 1942. Chicago: University of Chicago Press. OCLC 704158.
- Day, David (1999). John Curtin. A Life. Sydney: HarperCollins Publishers. ISBN 0-7322-6413-8.
- Dean, Peter (2013). "Anzacs and Yanks: US and Australian Operations at the Beachhead Battles". In Dean, Peter (ed.). Australia 1942: In the Shadow of War. Cambridge: Cambridge University Press. ISBN 978-1-107-03227-9. LCCN 2012464720.
- Dennis, Peter; Grey, Jeffrey; Morris, Ewan; Prior, Robin; Bou, Jean (2008). The Oxford Companion to Australian Military History (Second ed.). Melbourne: Oxford University Press. ISBN 978-0-19-551784-2.
- Department of the Army (1994) [1966]. Japanese Operations in the Southwest Pacific Area, Volume II – Part II. Reports of General MacArthur. United States Army Center of Military History. Archived from the original on 25 January 2008.
- Dod, Karl (1966). The Corps of Engineers: The War Against Japan. Washington, D.C.: United States Department of the Army. OCLC 17765223.
- Dufty, David (2017). The Secret Code-Breakers of Central Bureau. Melbourne, London: Scribe. ISBN 9781925322187.
- Fitzsimons, Peter (2004). Kokoda. Sydney: Hachette. ISBN 9780733619625. LCCN 2005440684.
- Gailey, Harry (2000). Macarthur Strikes Back. Novato: Presidio Press. ISBN 0-89141-702-8.
- Gailey, Harry A. (2004). MacArthur's Victory The War in New Guinea, 1943–1944 (1st ed.). New York: Presidio Press. ISBN 978-0-307-41593-6.
- Gillison, Douglas (1962). Royal Australian Air Force 1939–1942. Australia in the War of 1939–1945. Series 3 – Air. Vol. I. Canberra: Australian War Memorial. OCLC 2000369.
- Grey, Jeffrey (1999). A Military History of Australia. Cambridge: Cambridge University Press. ISBN 0-521-64483-6.
- Grey, Jeffrey (2001). The Australian Army. The Australian Centenary History of Defence (First ed.). Melbourne: Oxford University Press. ISBN 0-19-554114-6.
- Ham, Paul (2004). Kokoda. Sydney, New South Wales: HarperCollins. ISBN 978-0-7322-9836-4.
- Happell, Charles (2008). The Bone Man of Kokoda. Sydney: Macmillan. ISBN 978-1-4050-3836-2.
- Harries, Meirion; Harries, Susie (1991). Soldiers of the Sun: The Rise and Fall of the Imperial Japanese Army. New York: Random House. ISBN 0-679-75303-6.
- Haruki Yoshida (2017). "Japanese Commanders in Kokoda". In James, Karl (ed.). Kokoda: Beyond the Legend. Cambridge: Cambridge University Press. pp. 206–221. ISBN 978-1-107-18971-3.
- Hawthorne, Stuart (2003). The Kokoda Trail. Queensland: Central Queensland University Press. ISBN 1-876780-30-4.
- Hocking, Philip (1997). The Long Carry: A History of the 2/1st Australian Machine Gun Battalion, 1939–1946. Melbourne, Victoria: 2/1 Machine Gun Battalion Association. ISBN 0-646-30817-3.
- Horner, David (1978). Crisis of Command. Australian Generalship and the Japanese Threat, 1941–1943. Canberra: Australian National University Press. ISBN 0-7081-1345-1.
- Horner, David, ed. (1984). The Commanders: Australian Military Leadership in the Twentieth Century. Sydney: Allen & Unwin. ISBN 9780868614960.
- Horner, David (May 1993). "Defending Australia in 1942". The Pacific War 1942. War and Society. Canberra: Department of History, Australian Defence Force Academy. ISSN 0729-2473.
- Horner, David (1995). The Gunners: A History of Australian Artillery. St Leonards, New South Wales: Allen and Unwin. ISBN 978-1-86373-917-7.
- Horner, David (1998). Blamey: The Commander-in-Chief. St Leonards, New South Wales: Allen & Unwin. ISBN 978-1-86448-734-3.
- Hopkins, William B. (2008). The Pacific War: The Strategy, Politics, and Players that Won the War. Minneapolis: MBI Publishing. ISBN 978-1-61673-240-0.
- Hough, Frank O.; Ludwig, Verle E.; Shaw, Henry I. Jr. (1958). Pearl Harbor to Guadalcanal. History of US Marine Corps Operations in World War II. Vol. I. Historical Branch, G-3 Division, Headquarters, US Marine Corps. OCLC 11613327.
- Imparato, Edward (1998). 374th Troop Carrier Group. Paducah, Kentucky: Turner Publishing Company. ISBN 1-63026-949-2.
- James, Karl (2009). ""The Track": A Historical Desktop Study of the Kokoda Track" (PDF). Commonwealth Department of the Environment.
- James, Karl (2013). "On Australia's Doorstep: Kokoda and Milne Bay". In Dean, Peter (ed.). Australia 1942: In the Shadow of War. Port Melbourne, Victoria: Cambridge University Press. pp. 199–215. ISBN 978-1-10703-227-9.
- Johnston, Mark (2007). The Australian Army in World War II. Botley, Oxford: Osprey Publishing. ISBN 978-1-84603-123-6.
- Jones, Laurence (1989). Defense of the Philippines to the Battle of Buna: A Critical Analysis of General Douglas MacArthur (PDF). Maxwell Air Force Base, Alabama: Air War College, Air University. OCLC 834250873. Archived (PDF) from the original on 9 June 2015.
- Jowett, Phillip; Andrew, Stephen (2002). The Japanese Army 1931–45 (2): 1942–45. Botley, Oxford: Osprey Publishing. ISBN 978-1-84176-354-5.
- Kelly, Robert (2003). Development of Air Transport 1903–1943. Allied Air Transport Operations South West Pacific Area in WWII. Vol. 1. Buderim, Qld: Robert H Kelly. ISBN 0-64642-637-0.
- Kenney, George C. (1949). General Kenney Reports: A Personal History of the Pacific War. New York City: Duell, Sloan and Pearce. ISBN 0160613728.
- Keogh, E.G (1965). South West Pacific 1941–45. Melbourne: Grayflower Publications. OCLC 7185705.
- Kienzle, Robyn (2011). The Architect of Kokoda. Sydney: Hachette. ISBN 9780733627637. OCLC 710810025.
- Larrabee, Eric (2004). Commander in Chief: Franklin Delano Roosevelt, His Lieutenants, and Their War. Annapolis: Naval Institute Press. ISBN 1-59114-455-8.
- Maitland, Gordon (1999). The Second World War and its Australian Army Battle Honours. East Roseville, New South Wales: Kangaroo Press. ISBN 0-86417-975-8.
- Macquarie Dictionary (4th ed.). Lane Cove, New South Wales: Doubleday Australia. 2005. ISBN 0-86824-056-7.
- McAulay, Lex (1992a). Blood and Iron: The Battle for Kokoda 1942. Milsons Point, New South Wales: Arrow Books. ISBN 0-09-182628-4.
- McAulay, Lex (1992b). To the Bitter End: The Japanese Defeat at Buna and Gona, 1942–43. Sydney: Random House. ISBN 0091825571.
- McCarthy, Dudley (1959). South-West Pacific Area—First Year: Kokoda to Wau. Australia in the War of 1939–45, Series 1 – Army. Vol. V. Canberra: Australian War Memorial. OCLC 3134247.
- Mallett, Ross (2014). "Logistics and the Cartwheel Operations". In Dean, Peter (ed.). Australia 1943: The Liberation of New Guinea. Port Melbourne, Victoria: Cambridge University Press. pp. 167–185. ISBN 978-1-107-03799-1.
- Maughan, Barton (1966). Tobruk and El Alamein. Australia in the War of 1939–1945. Series 1 – Army. Vol. III. Canberra: Australian War Memorial. OCLC 954993.
- Milner, Samuel (1957). Victory in Papua. Washington, D.C.: United States Department of the Army. ISBN 1-4102-0386-7.
- Moremon, John (2000). A Triumph of Improvisation: Australian Army Operational Logistics and the Campaign in Papua, July 1942 to January 1943. Canberra: Australian Defence Force Academy. OCLC 648818801.
- Morton, Louis (1962). Strategy and Command: The First Two Years. United States Army in World War II: The War in the Pacific. Washington: Center of Military History, United States Army. OCLC 1355622.
- Papuan Campaign: Buna-Sanananda Operation 16 November 1942 – 23 January 1943 (PDF). Washington, D.C.: United States Army Center of Military History. 1990. LCCN 91601186. OCLC 21992748. Archived from the original (PDF) on 13 December 2014.
- Palazzo, Albert (2004). "Organising for Jungle Warfare". In Dennis, Peter; Grey, Jeffrey (eds.). The Foundations of Victory: The Pacific War 1943–1944. Canberra: Army History Unit. pp. 86–101. ISBN 978-0-646-43590-9. Archived from the original on 9 March 2016.
- Paull, Raymond (1958). Retreat from Kokoda:The Australian Campaign in New Guinea, 1942 (1983 ed.). Richmond, Victoria: William Heinermann Australia. ISBN 0-85561-049-2.
- Pérusse, Yvon (1993). Bushwalking in Papua New Guinea (2nd ed.). Hawthorne, Victoria: Lonely Planet. ISBN 0-86442-052-8.
- Pilger, Alison (1993). "Courage, Endurance and Initiative: Medical Evacuation from the Kokoda Track, August–October 1942". War & Society. 11 (1): 53–72. doi:10.1179/072924793791198868. ISSN 0729-2473.
- Rogerson, Emma (2012). "The "Fuzzy Wuzzy Angels": looking beyond the myth" (PDF). Australian War Memorial.
- Rowell, Sydney (1974). Full Circle. Melbourne: Melbourne University Press. ISBN 0-522-84058-2.
- Smith, Michael (2000). Bloody Ridge: The Battle That Saved Guadalcanal. New York: Pocket. ISBN 0-7434-6321-8.
- Stanley, Peter (2007). "What is the Battle for Australia?" (PDF). Australian Army Journal. 4 (2, Winter 2007). Archived from the original (PDF) on 23 January 2018.
- Stanley, Peter (2008). Invading Australia. Japan and the Battle for Australia, 1942. Melbourne: Penguin Australia. ISBN 978-0-670-02925-9.
- Tanaka, Toshiyuki (1996). Hidden Horrors: Japanese War Crimes in World War II (Illustrated ed.). Boulder: Westview Press. ISBN 0-8133-2718-0.
- Thompson, Peter (2008). Pacific Fury: How Australia and Her Allies Defeated the Japanese Scourge. North Sydney: William Heinemann. ISBN 978-1-74166-708-0.
- Threlfall, Adrian (2008). The Development of Australian Army Jungle Warfare (PDF) (PhD). Victoria University. OCLC 428961444.
- Threlfall, Adrian (2014). Jungle Warriors: From Tobruk to Kokoda and Beyond, How the Australian Army Became the World's Most Deadly Jungle Fighters. Sydney: Allen & Unwin. ISBN 978-1-74237-220-4.
- Walker, Allan (1956). The Island Campaigns. Australia in the War of 1939–45, Series 5 – Medical. Vol. III. Canberra: Australian War Memorial. OCLC 249848614.
- Watson, Richard L. Jr (1944). USAAF Historical Study No. 17: Air Action in the Papuan Campaign, 21 July 1942 to 23 January 1943 (PDF). Washington, DC: USAAF Historical Office. OCLC 22357584.
- Watson, Richard L.; Rohfleisch, Kramer J. (1950). "The Crisis in the South and Southwest Pacific". In Craven, Wesley Frank; Cate, James Lea (eds.). The Pacific: Guadalcanal to Saipan, August 1942 to July 1944. The Army Air Forces in World War II. Vol. IV. Chicago: University of Chicago Press. OCLC 5732980.
- Wigmore, Lionel (1957). The Japanese Thrust. Australia in the War of 1939–1945. Series 1 – Army. Vol. IV. Canberra: Australian War Memorial. OCLC 3134219.
- Williams, Peter (2012). The Kokoda Campaign 1942: Myth and Reality. Melbourne, Victoria: Cambridge University Press. ISBN 978-1-10701-594-4.
