= Templeton's Crossing =

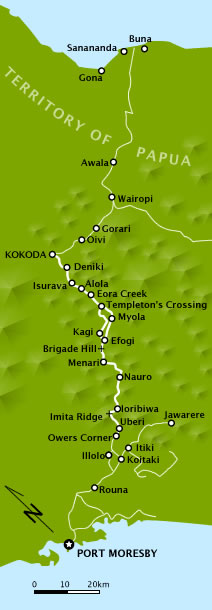
The Kokoda Track

Templeton's Crossing is a locality on the Kokoda Track in New Guinea. The original track, at the start of the Kokoda Track campaign, proceeded north from Kagi and crossed over the watershed of the Owen Stanley Range as it passed through "the Gap" (Note: "The (Kokoda) Gap" is a dip in the Owen Stanley Range about 11 kilometres (7 mi) wide, convenient for aircraft crossing the range to pass through.'"`UNIQ--ref-00000002-QINU`"' Such was the ignorance of the terrain by Allied planners, that it was perceived to be a narrow defile that could easily be blocked by explosives or held against a determined enemy by only a small force.'"`UNIQ--ref-00000003-QINU`"''"`UNIQ--ref-00000004-QINU`"''"`UNIQ--ref-00000005-QINU`"') – skirting the eastern side of Mount Bellamy. The track then proceeded north through the steep-sided Eora Creek valley. Templeton's Crossing is where the original track first crosses Eora Creek. (Note: Anderson'"`UNIQ--ref-00000008-QINU`"' reports that it was named for a crossing of tracks and not for a crossing over Eora Creek. Maps provided by both Anderson'"`UNIQ--ref-00000009-QINU`"' and McCarthy'"`UNIQ--ref-0000000A-QINU`"' show the new track section from Myola joining the old track but not a crossing of tracks. The maps also show the old track crossing Eora Creek at this point. James reports that Kienzle named the "crossing" after cutting the route from Myola, north.'"`UNIQ--ref-0000000B-QINU`"' To avoid confusion in his work, Anderson has chosen to refer to the bypassed section of track as the "Mount Bellamy Trail".'"`UNIQ--ref-0000000C-QINU`"' It is marked as such on his map.) It was named by (then) Lieutenant Bert Kienzle in memory of Captain Sam Templeton. Templeton commanded B Company, 39th Battalion. It was the first of the battalion's companies to deploy overland for the defence of Kokoda – arriving shortly before the Japanese landings. Templeton was killed in the early stages of the Japanese advance. Kienzle was an officer of the Australian New Guinea Administrative Unit, that had been tasked, among other things, to establish supply dumps and staging points along the track. In the course of this, he was to guide Templeton's B Company over the track as it deployed.

When the drop zone at Myola was identified by Kienzle, the main route used by the Australian forces was diverted through this important supply point, cutting a new section of track. Kienzle named the "crossing" after cutting the route from Myola, north. The route north from Myola first follows the Myola Ridge, before descending to cross Eora Creek at a point about an equal march between Myola and Templeton's Crossing. A supply dump, Dump 1, was established there. Rather than following the creek from there, the track crosses a ridge as it heads toward Templeton's Crossing. Confusingly, the site of Dump 1 has, in some sources, been identified as "Templeton's Crossing No 1" while the original crossing is called "Templeton's Crossing No 2". This appears to have originated from "Longitudinal section of the Kokoda Trail" produced in 1978 by the "Department of Works and Supply".

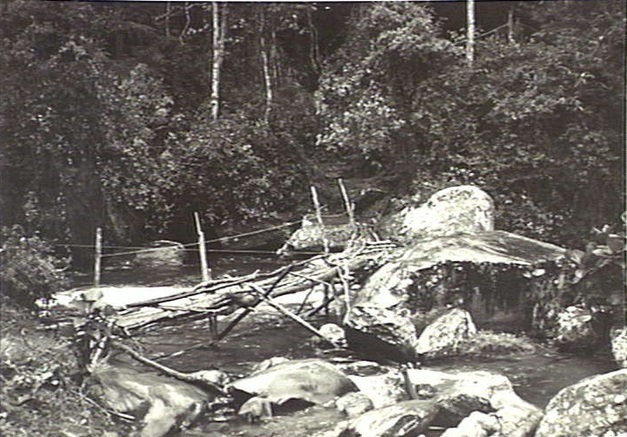
Templeton's Crossing, Kokoda Track, 1944

Templeton's Crossing is associated with two battles of the Kokoda Track campaign of the Second World War fought between Australians of Maroubra Force and Japanese troops. Both battles consisted of a series of engagements that occurred in the upper reaches of the Eora Creek valley. The first battle was fought from 31 August 1942 to 5 September 1942, as the Australian forces were withdrawing in the face of the Japanese advance. The second battle was fought from 11 to 28 October 1942, as the Australian forces pursued the Japanese forces withdrawing back to the north coast of Papua. In each battle, a significant engagement was fought in the vicinity of Templeton's Crossing.
