= Fuzzy Wuzzy Angels =

Name for Papua New Guinean war carriers

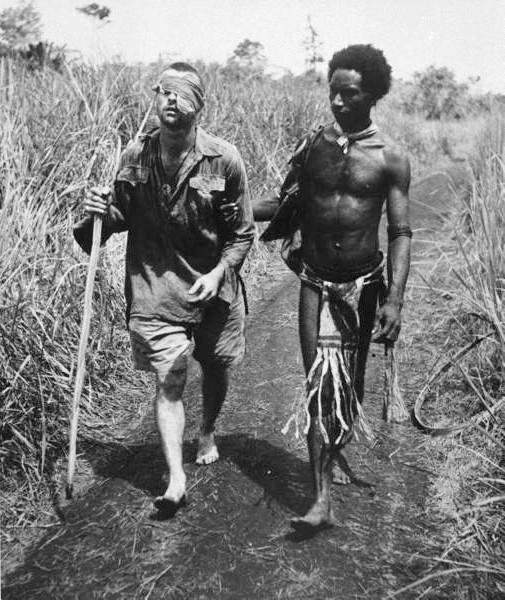
Dec 25, 1942, at the Battle of Buna-Gona, Papuan Raphael Oimbari aids Australian soldier George "Dick" Whittington, who died of bush typhus in February 1943. (Photo by George Silk)

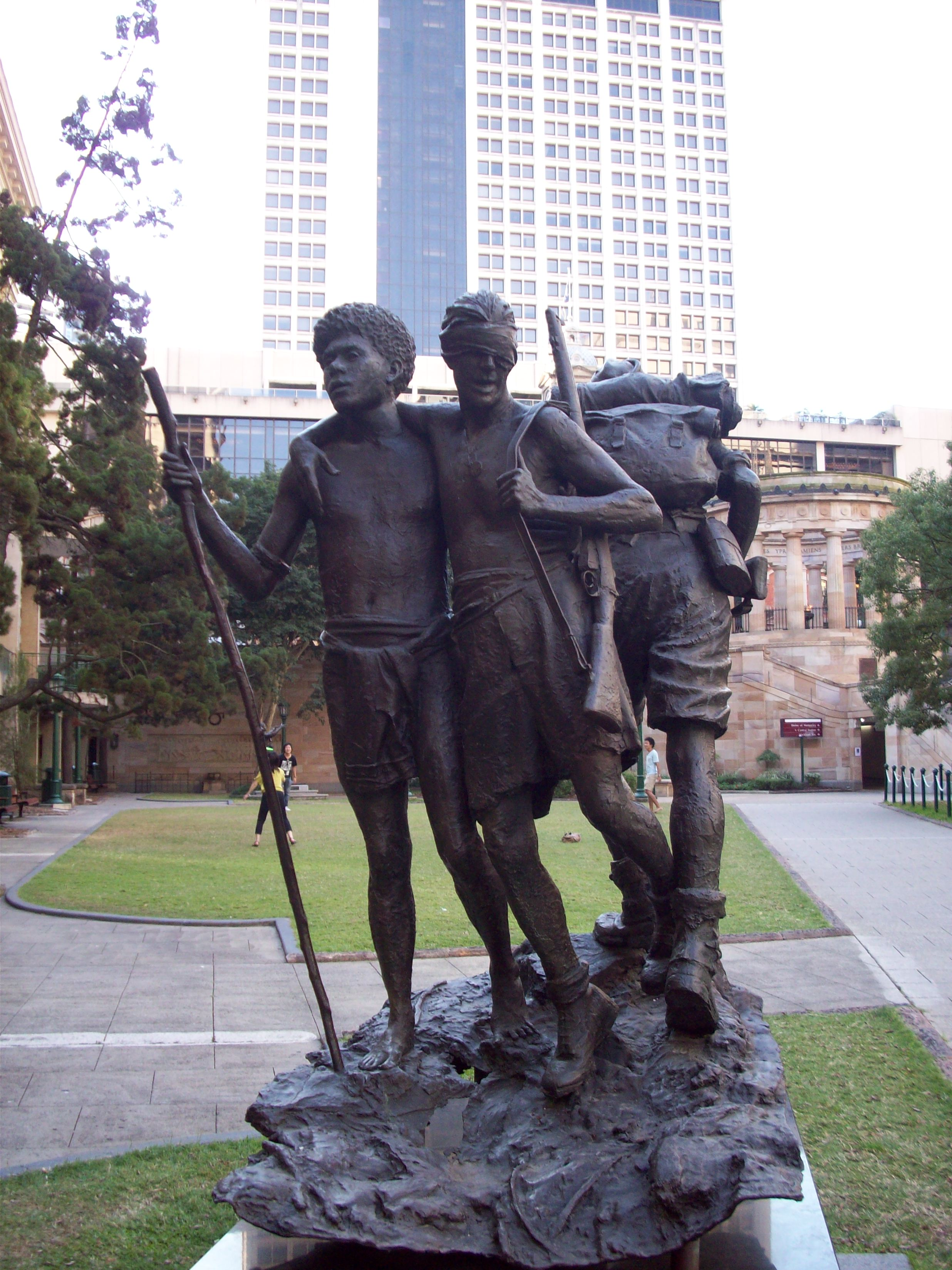
Statue in Brisbane commemorating the Kokoda Trail and the Fuzzy Wuzzy Angels.

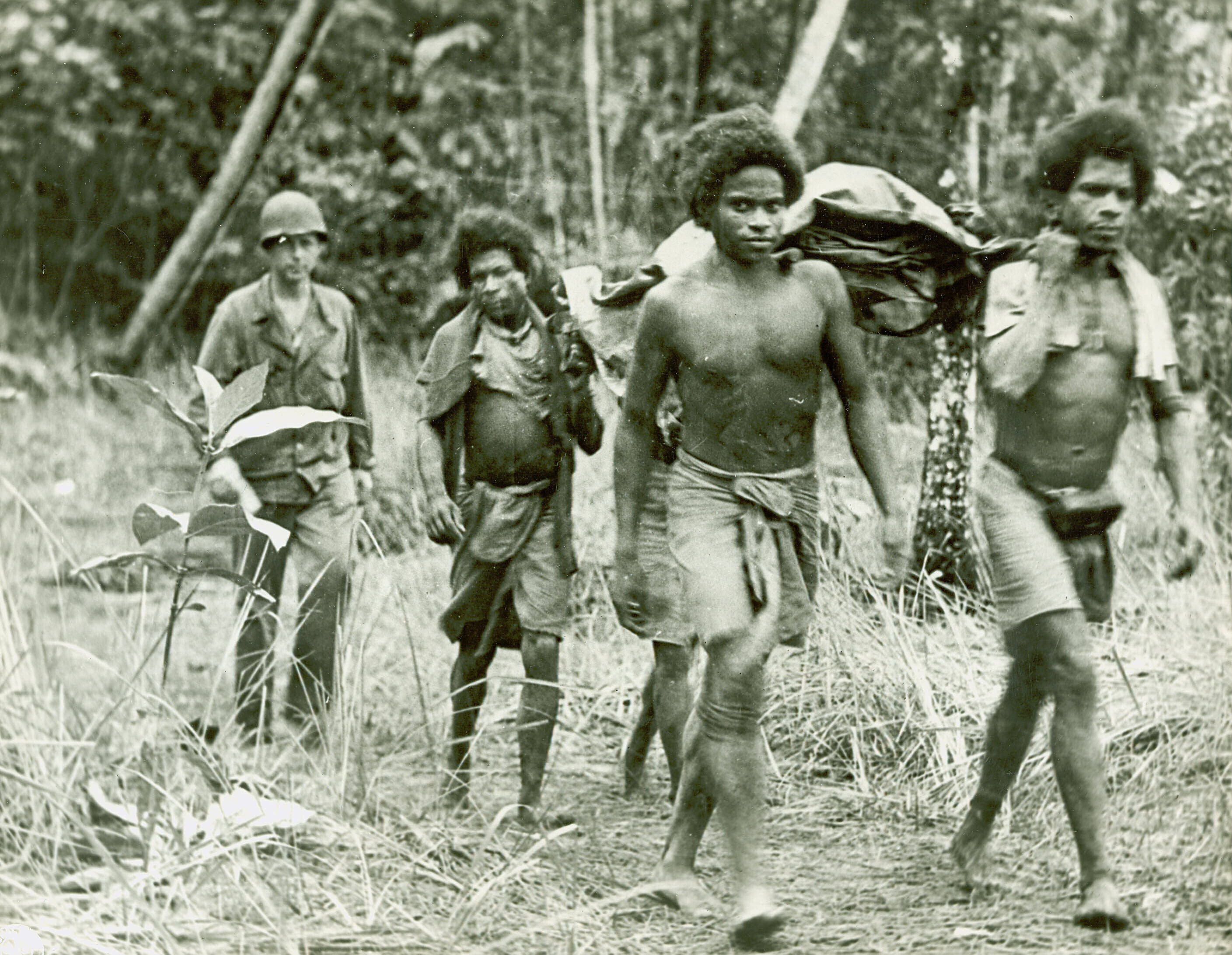
New Guineans carrying the body of an American soldier near Buna, 1942.

"Fuzzy Wuzzy Angels" was the name given by Australian soldiers to Papua New Guinean war carriers who, during World War II, were recruited service to bring supplies up to the front and carry injured Australian troops down the Kokoda trail during the Kokoda Campaign.

Under the Australian military government in New Guinea, many of the Papua New Guinean workers were conscripted into work to support the war effort, forced by Australian soldiers through threat of force or injury, or unfulfilled promises. As civilian workers, after the war they were not eligible for a military pension until the 1980s.

== History ==
"Fuzzy-Wuzzy" was originally used by British soldiers in the 19th century as a name for Hadendoa warriors on the Red Sea coast of the Sudan, and referred to their elaborate butter-matted hairstyles.

In 1942, during the Pacific invasion, the Japanese had built up a force of 13,500 in the Gona region of Papua with the intention of invading Port Moresby. The key to the offensive was an overland trail across the Owen Stanley Ranges. The trail ranged from the small village of Buna on the north coast of Papua and went up the slopes through Gorari and Oivi to Kokoda. The trail was approximately 160 kilometres (99 mi) long, folded into a series of ridges, rising higher and to 2,100 metres (6,900 ft) and then declining again to 900 metres (3,000 ft). It was covered in thick jungle, short trees and tall trees tangled with vines.

In June 1942, Australian Major General Basil Morris issued an "Employment of Natives Order", which allowed native Papuans to be recruited as carriers for three years. Between August and December that year, around 16,000 Papuans were recruited, often with false promises such as a shorter period of service or a less difficult working condition. In some occasions, the Papuans were forced into service.

On 29 August 1942, the Japanese task force broke through the Australian line forcing the Australians to retreat further back to Templeton's Crossing. Eventually, the Australians were forced to retreat to Myola. Six hundred and fifty Australians died in the campaign. It is speculated that this number would have been much larger without the Papuans' service. As one Australian digger has noted:

They carried stretchers over seemingly impassable barriers, with the patient reasonably comfortable. The care they give to the patient is magnificent. If night finds the stretcher still on the track, they will find a level spot and build a shelter over the patient. They will make him as comfortable as possible fetch him water and feed him if food is available, regardless of their own needs. They sleep four each side of the stretcher and if the patient moves or requires any attention during the night, this is given instantly. These were the deeds of the "Fuzzy Wuzzy Angels" – for us!

Australian war correspondent Osmar White noted after the War that the Papua New Guinean war carriers were not serving voluntarily, stating:

The majority did their work only because the few men in command bullied them into doing it. Few if any were serving voluntarily and most would have deserted if possible. At this stage they knew of no reason and felt no desire to fight on the side of the Australians against the Japanese; but the habit of obeying western men, inculcated by about sixty years of colonization, was hard to break.

No known injured soldier that was still alive was ever abandoned by the Fuzzy Wuzzy Angels, even during heavy combat. In July 2007, grandsons of Australian World War II soldiers and grandsons of the Fuzzy Wuzzy Angels took part in the "Kokoda Challenge". The last Fuzzy Wuzzy Angel from the Kokoda Track area, Faole Bokoi, died aged 91 in 2016. He was appointed the Village Constable of his village, Manari, in the 1950s and had visited Australia as a guest of the Returned Services League in his later years. The last Fuzzy Wuzzy Angel was Havala Laula who died on 24 December 2017.

== Official recognition ==
In June 2008, Australian senator Guy Barnett called for his country's Parliament to give official recognition to Papua New Guineans' courage and contributions to the war effort.

I was stunned to learn that Australia has not officially recognised these wonderful PNG nationals who saved the lives of Australian servicemen. They carried stretchers, stores and sometimes wounded diggers directly on their shoulders over some of the toughest terrain in the world. Without them I think the Kokoda campaign would have been far more difficult than it was.

In 2009, the Australian government began awarding the 'Fuzzy Wuzzy Commemorative Medallion' to living Papua New Guineans who assisted the Australian war effort, usually bringing survivors and their families to Port Moresby for ceremonial presentations. Australian veterans generally complained that the recognition was too little, too late.

=== Fuzzy Wuzzy Angels Day ===
In 2009, Papua New Guinean tourism minister Charles Abel announced that cabinet had approved 3 November as an annual day of commemoration for World War II carriers, to be named Fuzzy Wuzzy Angels Day. It was not given public holiday status and initially was to be centred on Kokoda, then later expanded to "other historical war sites where Papua New Guineans helped the Allies". The initial events scheduled for 2009 were cancelled due to a lack of funding, with the first official commemoration held in 2010.
