= RGH =

RGH may refer to:

- Royal Gloucestershire Hussars, a former British Army Regiment
- RGH-188, an antipsychotic drug
- Repatriation General Hospital, a group of Australian hospitals, mostly active between 1947 and 1995
- RGH UMC, Riverside General Hospital University Medical Center in California
- Rockyview General Hospital, in Calgary, Alberta, Canada
- Raleigh (Amtrak station), station code RGH
- Reset Glitch Hack, a way to modify an Xbox 360 game console
- Royal Gwent Hospital, hospital in the city of Newport, South Wales
- Rabbids Go Home, a 2009 video game released for Nintendo DS and Wii
