= Kokoda Track Memorial Walkway =

War memorial in Sydney, Australia

Coordinates: 33.834695°S 151.09108°E

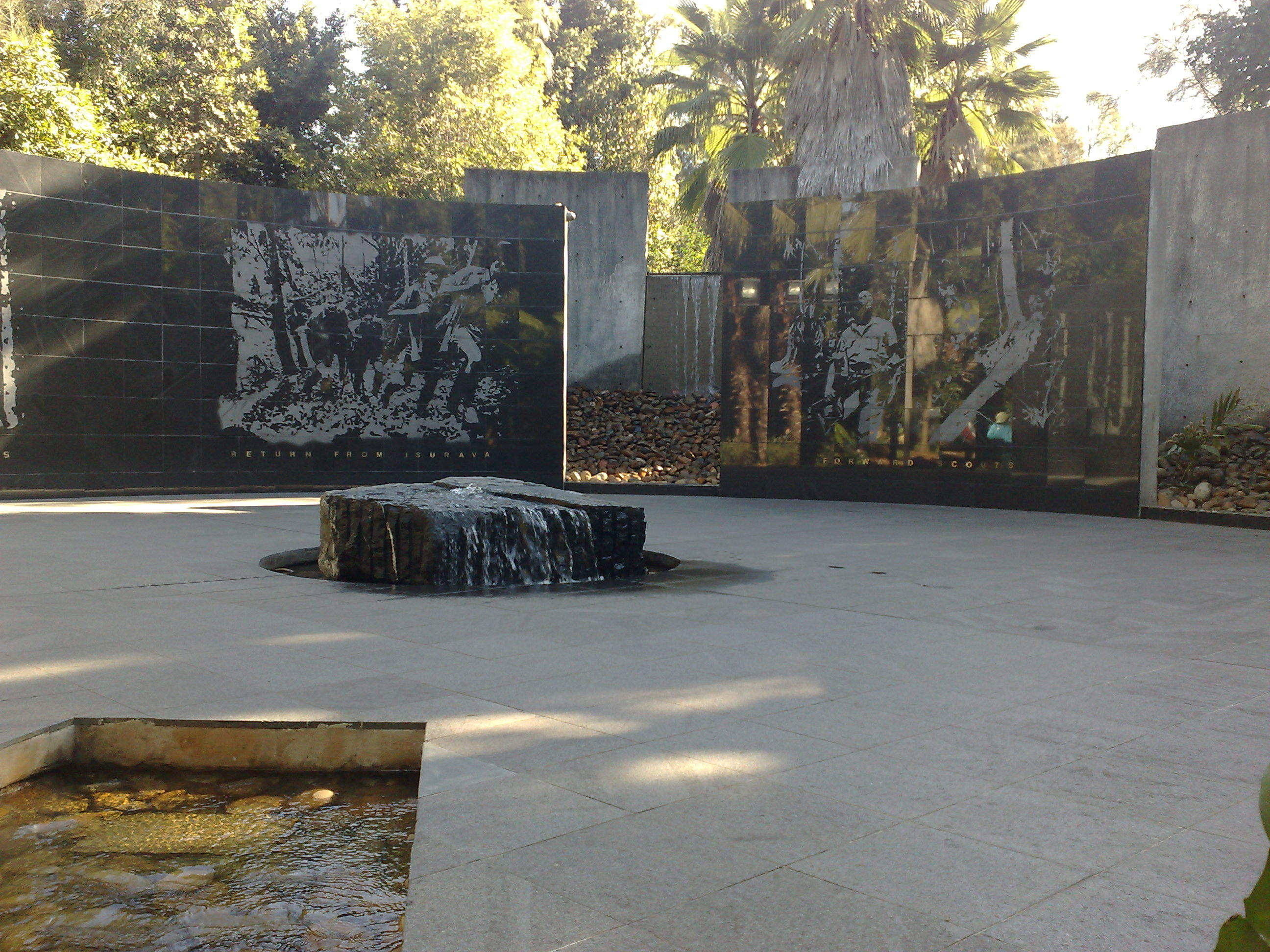
Memorial Walkway Centre Piece

The Kokoda Track Memorial Walkway is a walking track and war memorial located in the suburb of Concord West, Sydney, New South Wales, Australia. It is located along Brays Bay on the Parramatta River, and is a unique tribute to the Australian troops who fought in the World War II Papua-New Guinea campaign of July 1942 till December 1943.

The Walkway serves as a focal point for local, state and national representatives to honour the service of those who fought in Papua New Guinea, and to ensure the service and sacrifices of those individuals (including the Fuzzy Wuzzy Angels and other Papuans who assisted the Australians) is passed on to current and future generations, particularly school children through a comprehensive schools visitation program.

== History ==
Construction of the Kokoda Track Memorial Walkway commenced in 1994 and was designed by DM Taylor Landscape Architect Pty Ltd. The Walkway is a joint partnership between the Concord Repatriation General Hospital, the now City of Canada Bay Council, the NSW Returned and Services League (RSL) and the Concord Rotary Club. The Walkway was opened on 3 October 1996 by the then Minister for Veterans' Affairs, the Hon Bruce Scott MP.

On Victory in the Pacific (VP) Day 14 August 2009 the Ralph Honner Kokoda Education Centre was opened by the then Premier of NSW, the Hon. Nathan Rees.

The current patron of the Walkway is Her Excellency the Honourable Ms Sam Mostyn AC, Governor-General of the Commonwealth of Australia.

== Description ==
The Walkway consists of more than 800 metres of pathway, starting from Concord Repatriation General Hospital to Rhodes railway station. Along the Walkway visitors will see 22 information stations, each describing a significant place or engagement of the campaign together with photographs and maps which outline how the campaign was fought. QR codes on each station allow visitors to supplement their knowledge through further details on the webpage for each Station.

The Ralph Honner Kokoda Educational Centre (named after the commanding officer of the 39th Battalion which fought in the campaign) is also located on the route of the Walkway where school students and other visitors can further study the events during the Papua-New Guinea campaign. In November 2022 a digital honour roll was launched, featuring the names of the approximately 620 Australians killed in the Kokoda campaign. The roll is permanently projected onto the windows of the Education Centre.

The main entrance to the Walkway is through the Memorial Rose Garden, and features two semi-circular memorial walls amongst a bed of roses. Over 500 plaques dedicated to the memory of individuals or specific units who primarily served in the war (especially the Kokoda campaign) are mounted on the surrounding walls. The Walkway is linked to the Memorial Rose Garden by the Bruce Kingsbury V.C. Path. Private Kingsbury was also commemorated in November 2022 with the unveiling of the Private Bruce Kingsbury VC Memorial Garden (and deck), which is adjacent to the Education Centre.

At the centre of the Walkway is a series of granite walls on which images of the New Guinea campaign have been sandblasted. This Centrepiece forms the actual memorial where commemorative events occur. A cascading waterfall alongside the granite walls also forms a part of the Centrepiece.

Lush tropical vegetation environment has been planted, simulating the conditions of the original Kokoda Track.

Included in the Walkway grounds is an area where visitors can have refreshments, including a barbecue.

The Walkway is supported by donations and volunteers from individuals, local and other community groups, numerous sub-branches of the NSW Returned and Services League (RSL), and financial support from Local, State and Commonwealth governments. The Friends of Kokoda program is another support program for the Walkway.

== Schools and education program ==
A primary purpose of the Walkway is to educate current and future generations of the service of Australians in World War II, focusing on the South West Pacific, including New Guinea and the Kokoda Track campaign.

The Walkway hosts over 4500 school children each year, with structured visitations where groups are accompanied by volunteer guides with extensive knowledge of the campaign. This program is supplemented by a series of educational material available for schools.

On Kokoda Day 3 November 2021 a virtual reality (VR) program located in the Ralph Honner Kokoda Education Centre was launched.

This VR program allows students to imagine they are on the Kokoda Track, with first hand accounts and historical documentary scenes adding to the experience. An Augmented Reality application allows the students to gain further information as they visit each of the stations along the Walkway.

== Commemorative events ==
Each year, the Walkway hosts a number of commemorative events, all of which can be attended by members of the public.

The main events are:

- Anzac Day (25 April): traditionally, Anzac Day is commemorated at the Walkway prior to 25 April, allowing individuals to attend commemorative events on 25 April.
- Victory in the Pacific (VP) Day (15 August): is the day on which Imperial Japan surrendered in World War II, in effect bringing the war to an end on that day.
- Kokoda Day (3 November): this day is the anniversary of the raising of the Australian flag at Kokoda village in 1942, following the near completion of the brutal campaign waged since July 1942. In 2022, a special 80th anniversary event was held at the Walkway to mark this significant date. At this event, and following lobbying by the Walkway Board and supporters, the NSW State Government announced that 3 November will be designated NSW Kokoda Day to honour those who fought in this campaign.

The Walkway acknowledges Remembrance Day (11 November) in an informal manner on the day, rather than with an organised service. Other anniversaries are commemorated in a similar manner with the laying of poppies or wreaths at the Memorial Centrepiece.

== Future plans ==
The KTMW Board of Directors which oversees the operation of the Walkway has a number of plans to further promote the knowledge and understanding of the significance of the Kokoda campaign, as well as to enhance the experience of visitors, including:

- the launching of a new website for the Walkway, with enhanced sections, including those focussing on the commemorative and educational objectives of the Walkway.
- to have the Walkway gazetted as a war memorial of national significance, to reflect its ongoing commitment to commemorate the Kokoda campaign and the role it plays in educating school children about the campaign.
- expanded entry points and signage at both ends of the walkway to increase awareness of the Walkway.
- upgrade the CCTV equipment which will enhance visitor safety and wellbeing. This upgrade will also mitigate vandalism which has previously caused damage to the Walkway.

== Gallery ==
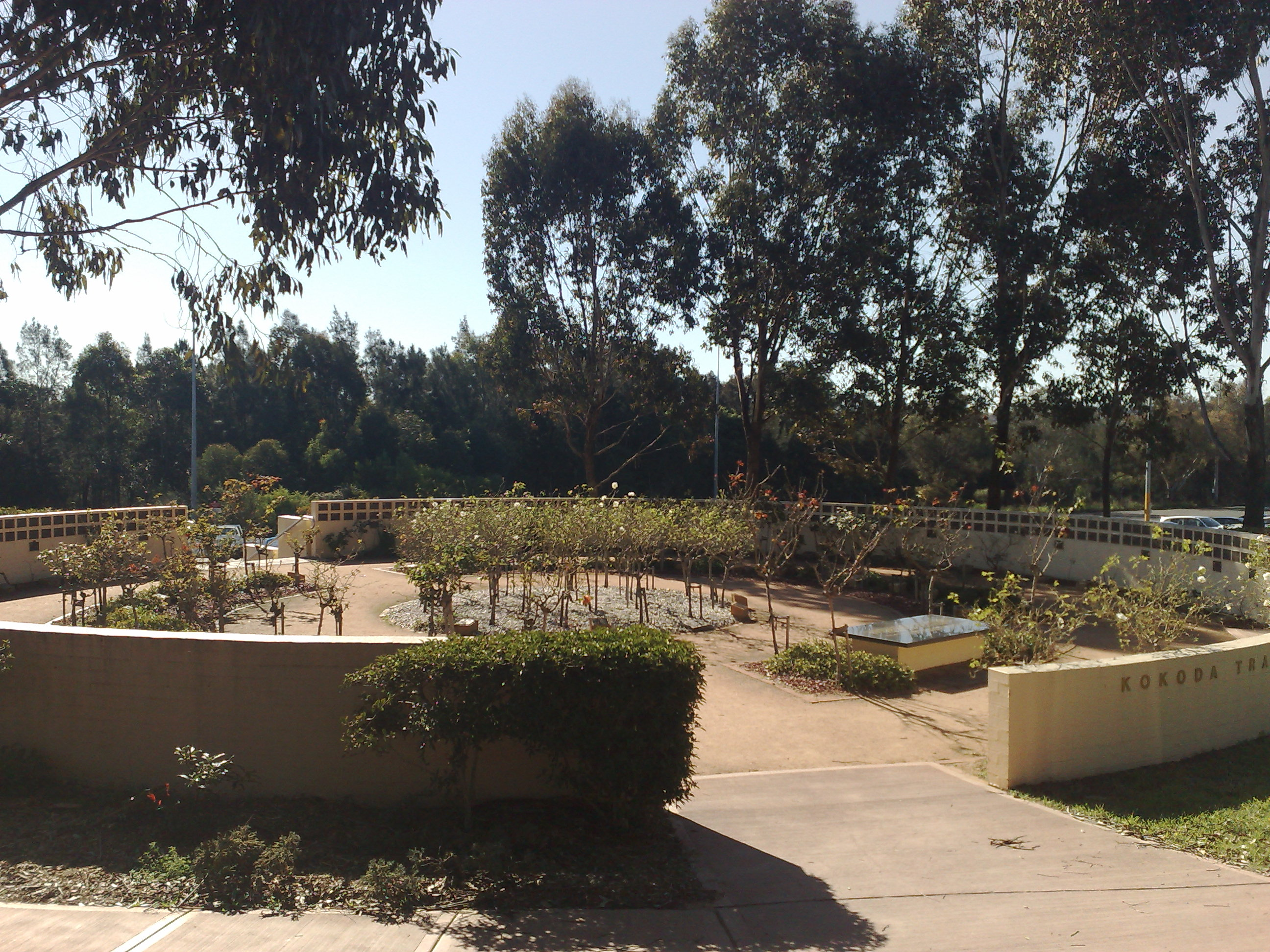
Memorial Rose Garden entrance

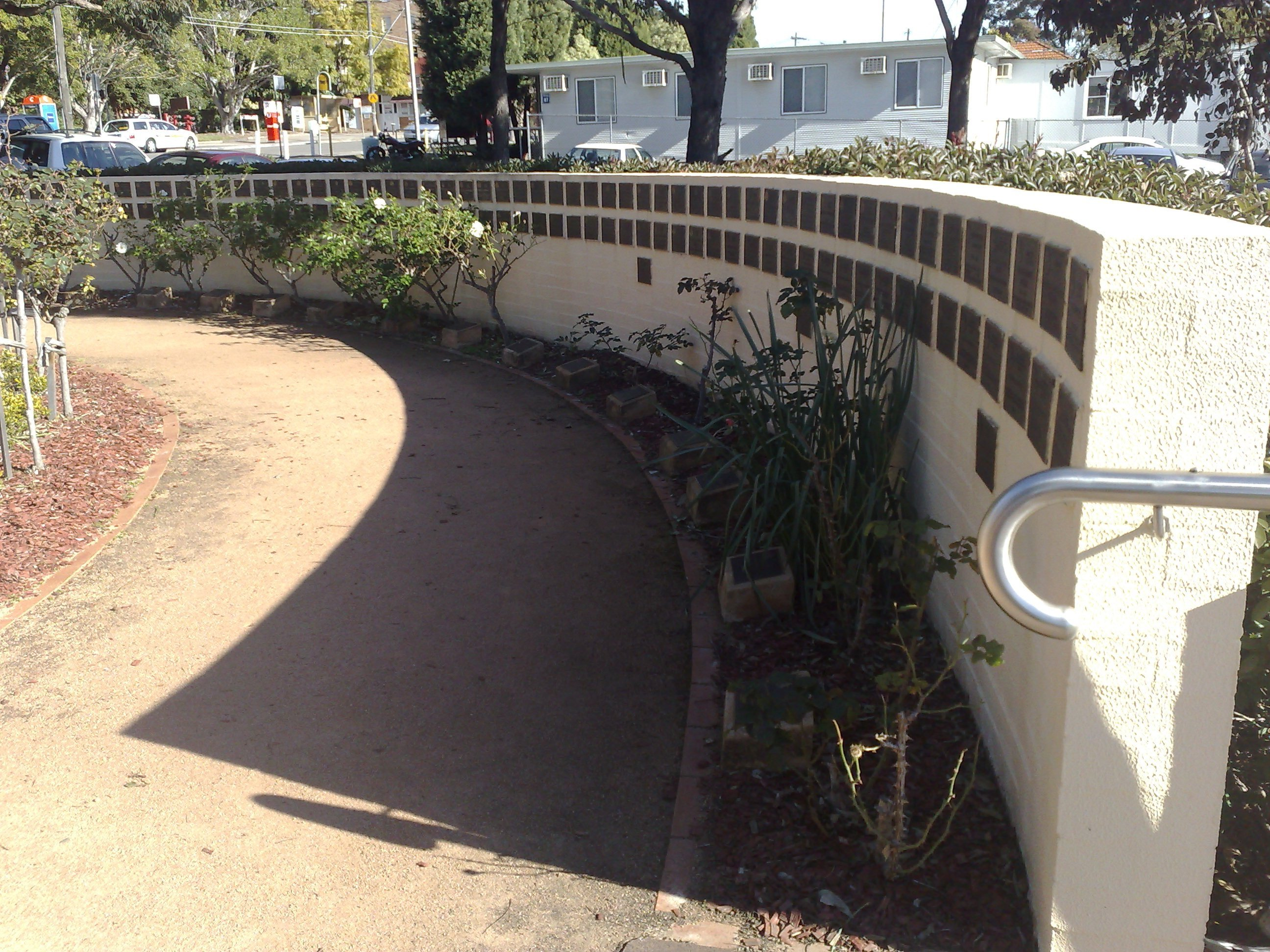
Plaques within the Memorial Rose Garden

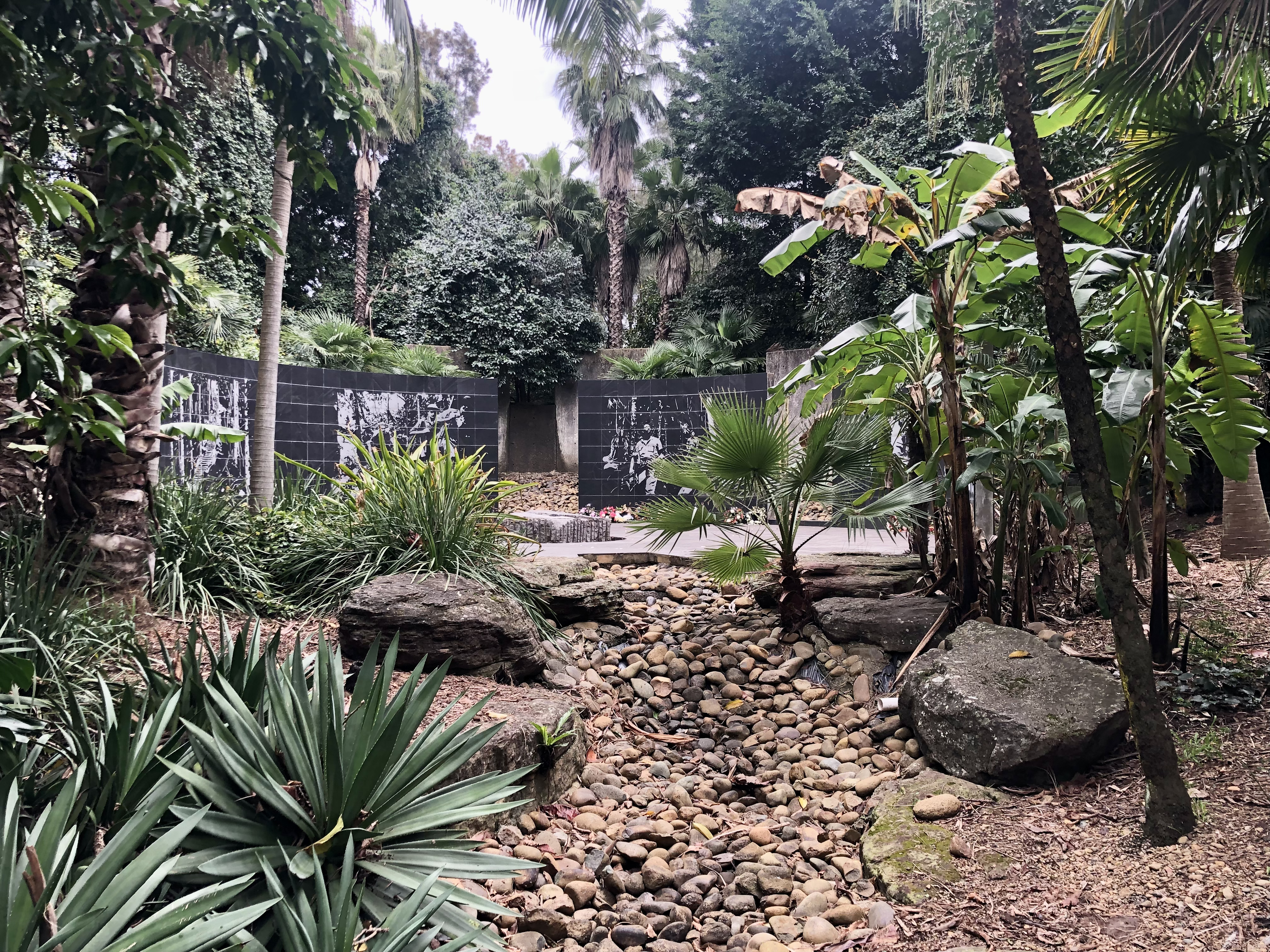
The Walkway's Memorial Centrepiece.

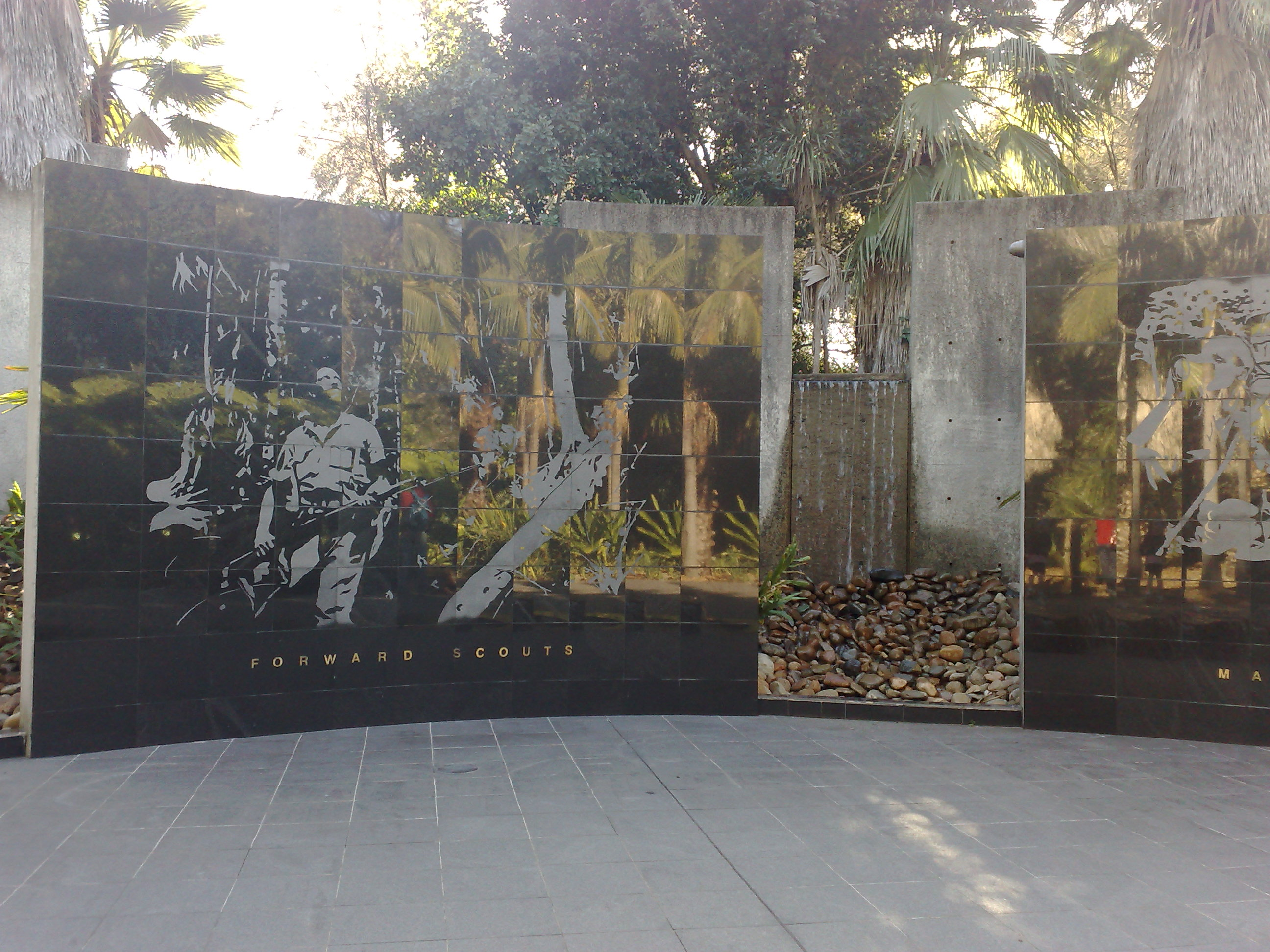
Granite wall showing scenes from the campaign

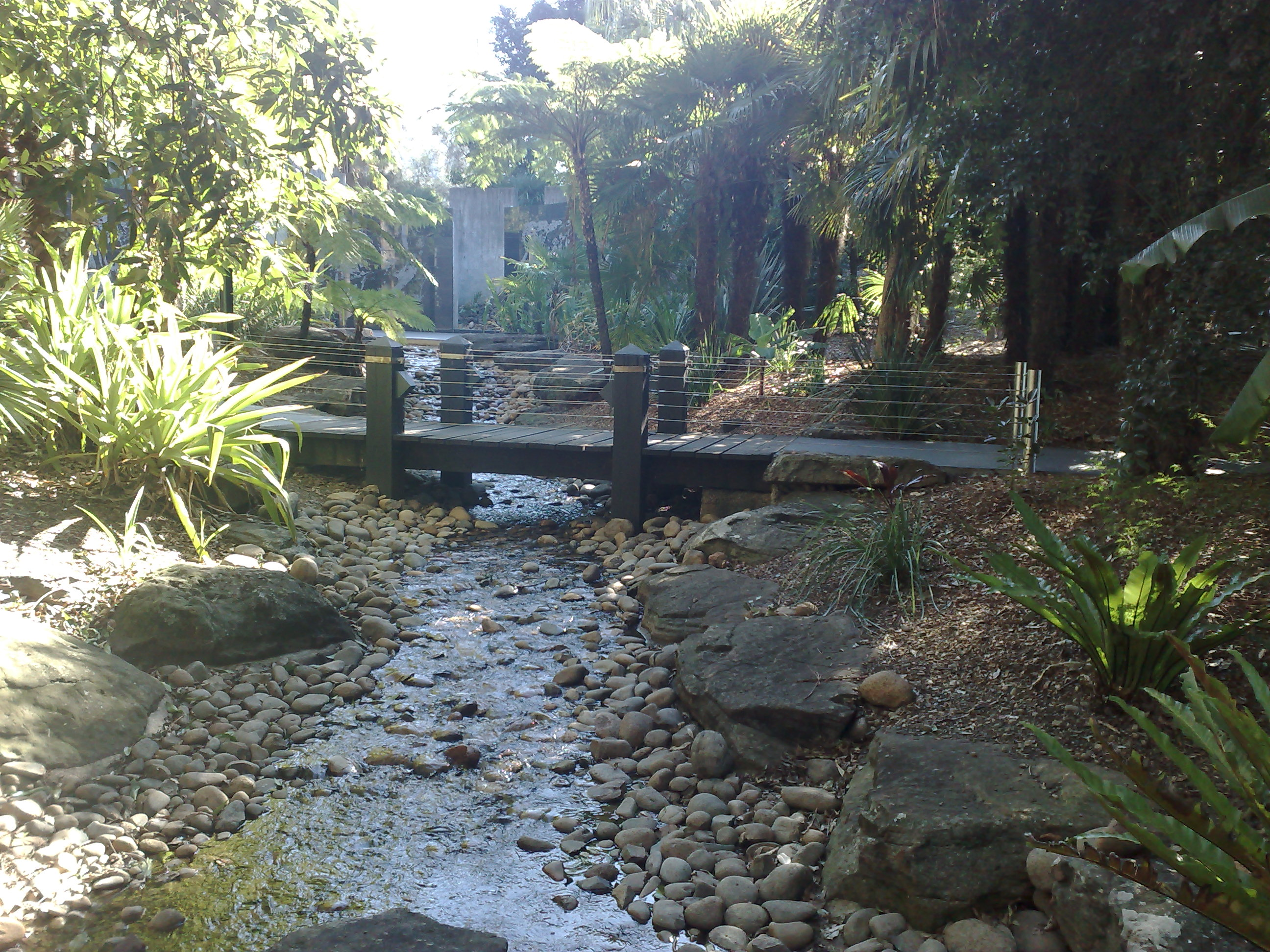
Stream showing simulated jungle environment

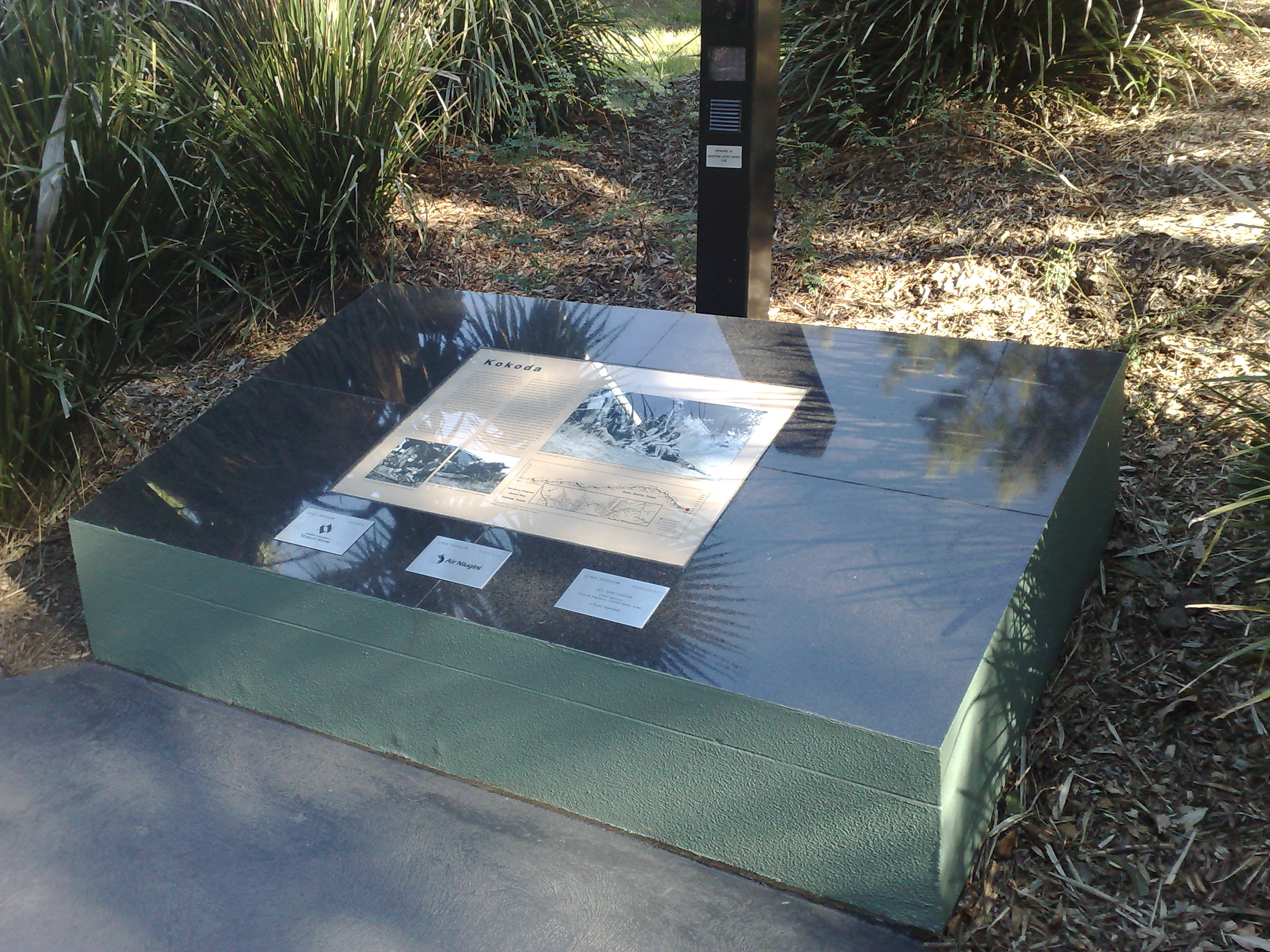
One of the 22 stations along the Walkway, each representing a major battle or location in the campaign

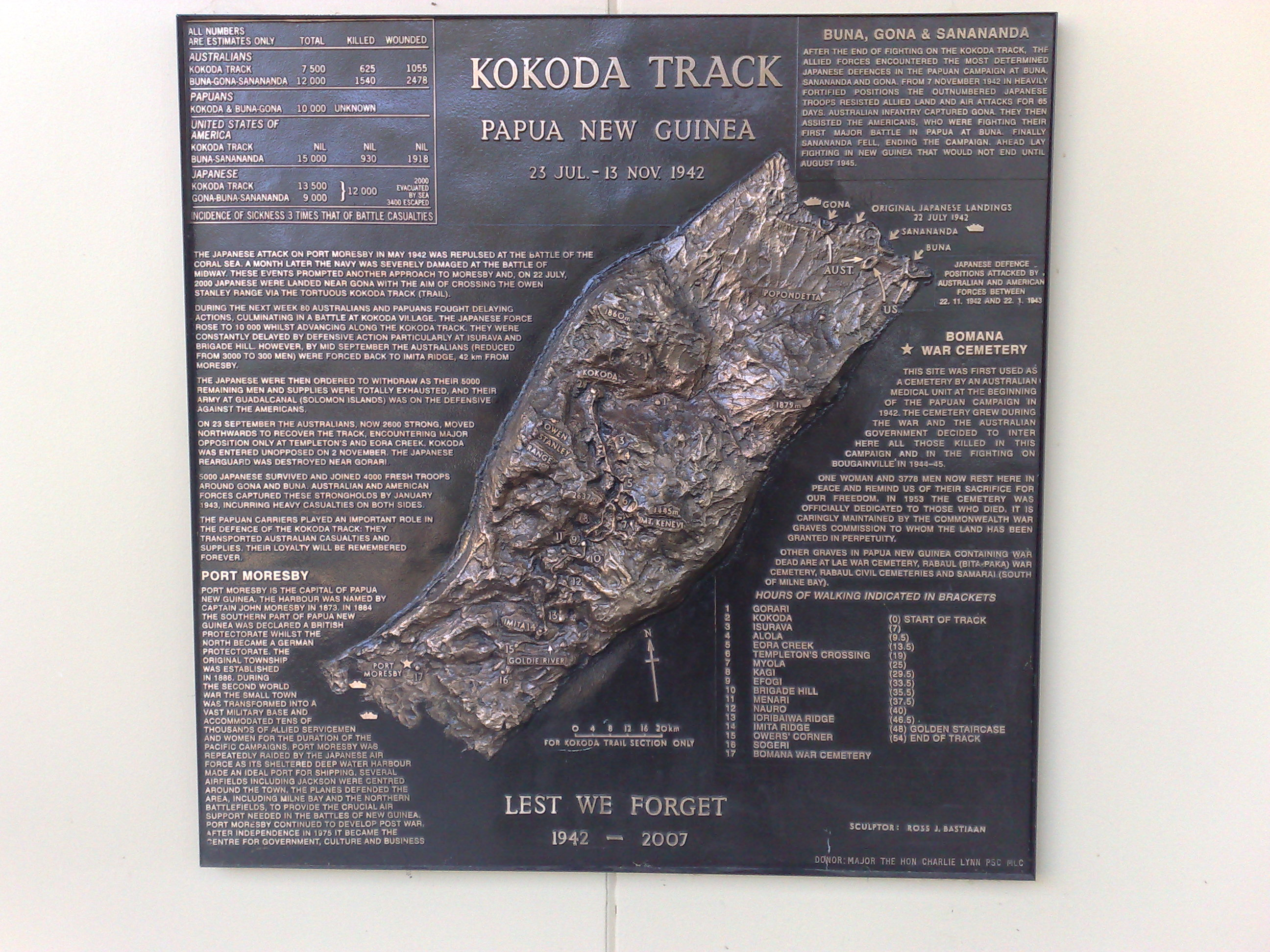
Relief plaque of Papua New Guinea outlining the Kokoda Track campaign

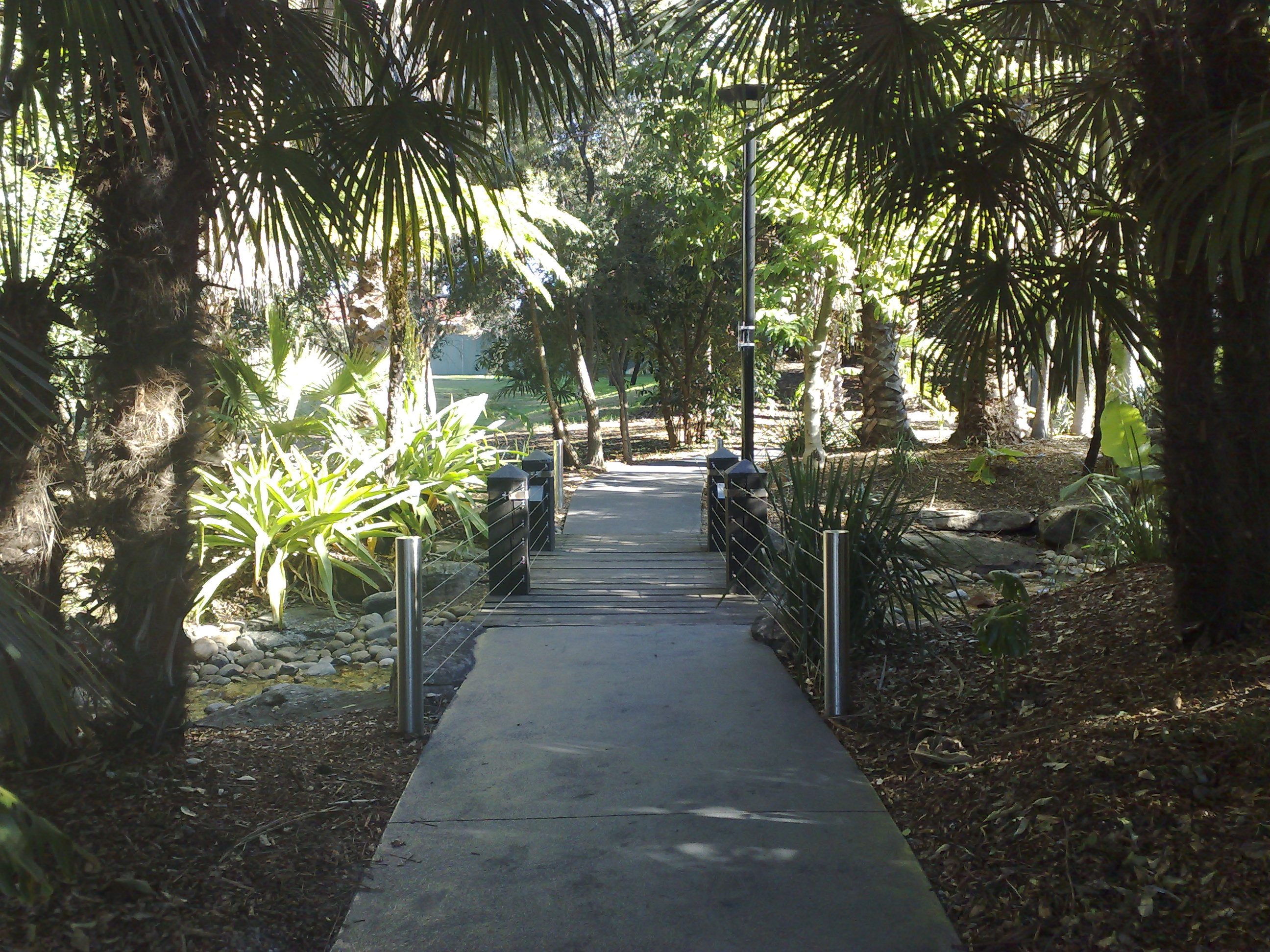
One section of the Walkway path

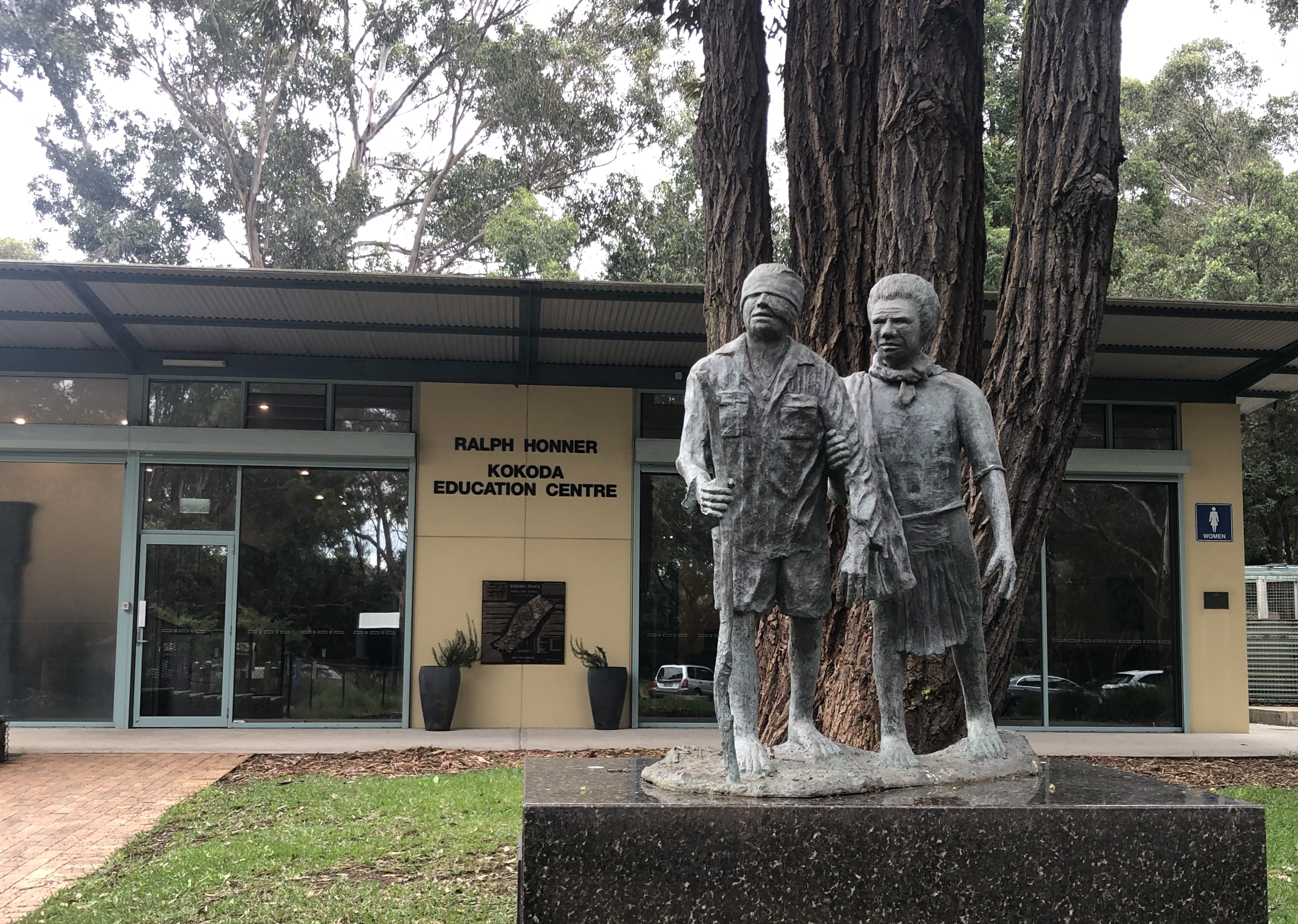
Ralph Honner Kokoda Education Centre and Fuzzy Wuzzy Angel statue

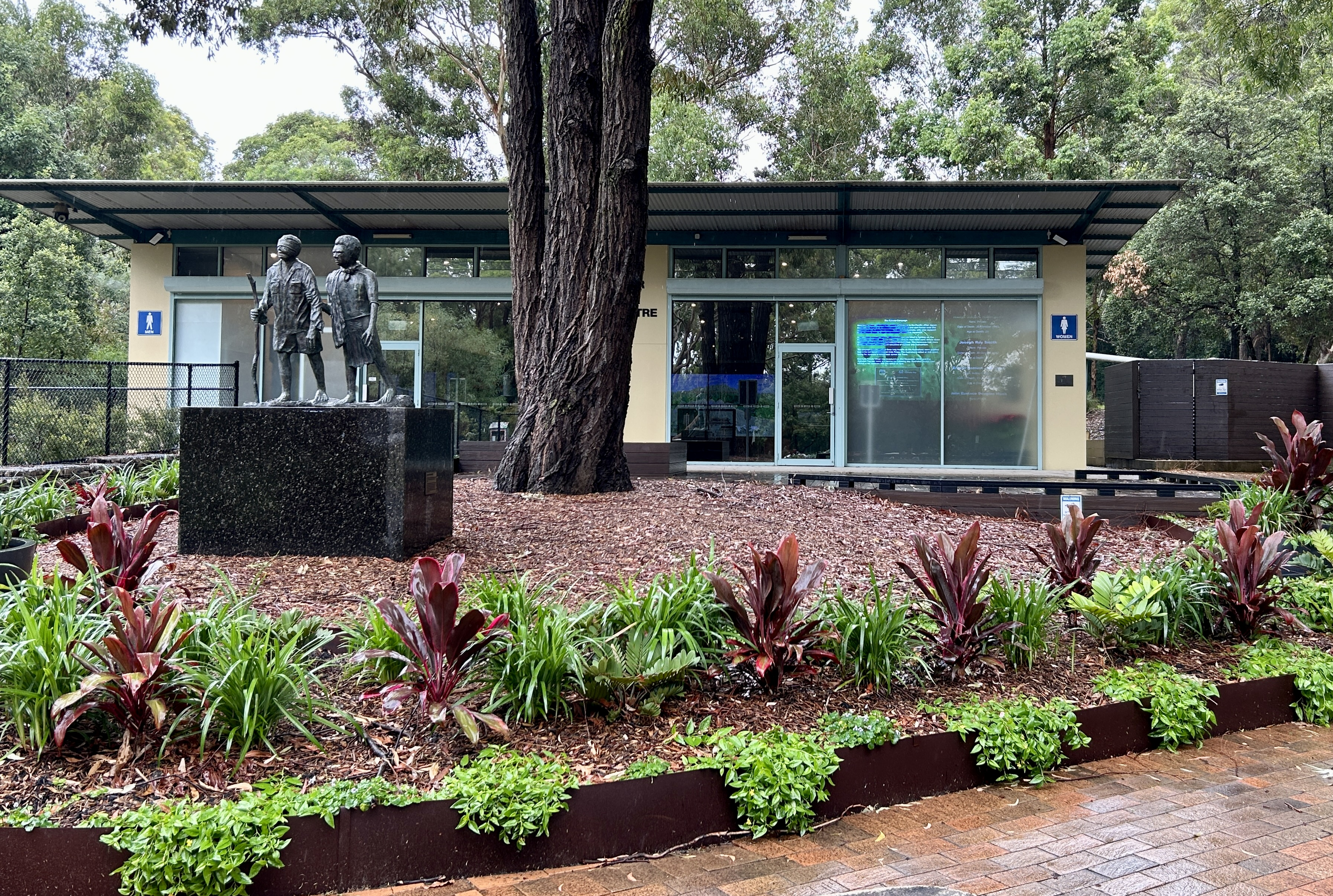
Private Bruce Kingsbury VC Memorial Garden with the Digital Honour Roll projected onto the Education Centre's window (right hand side)

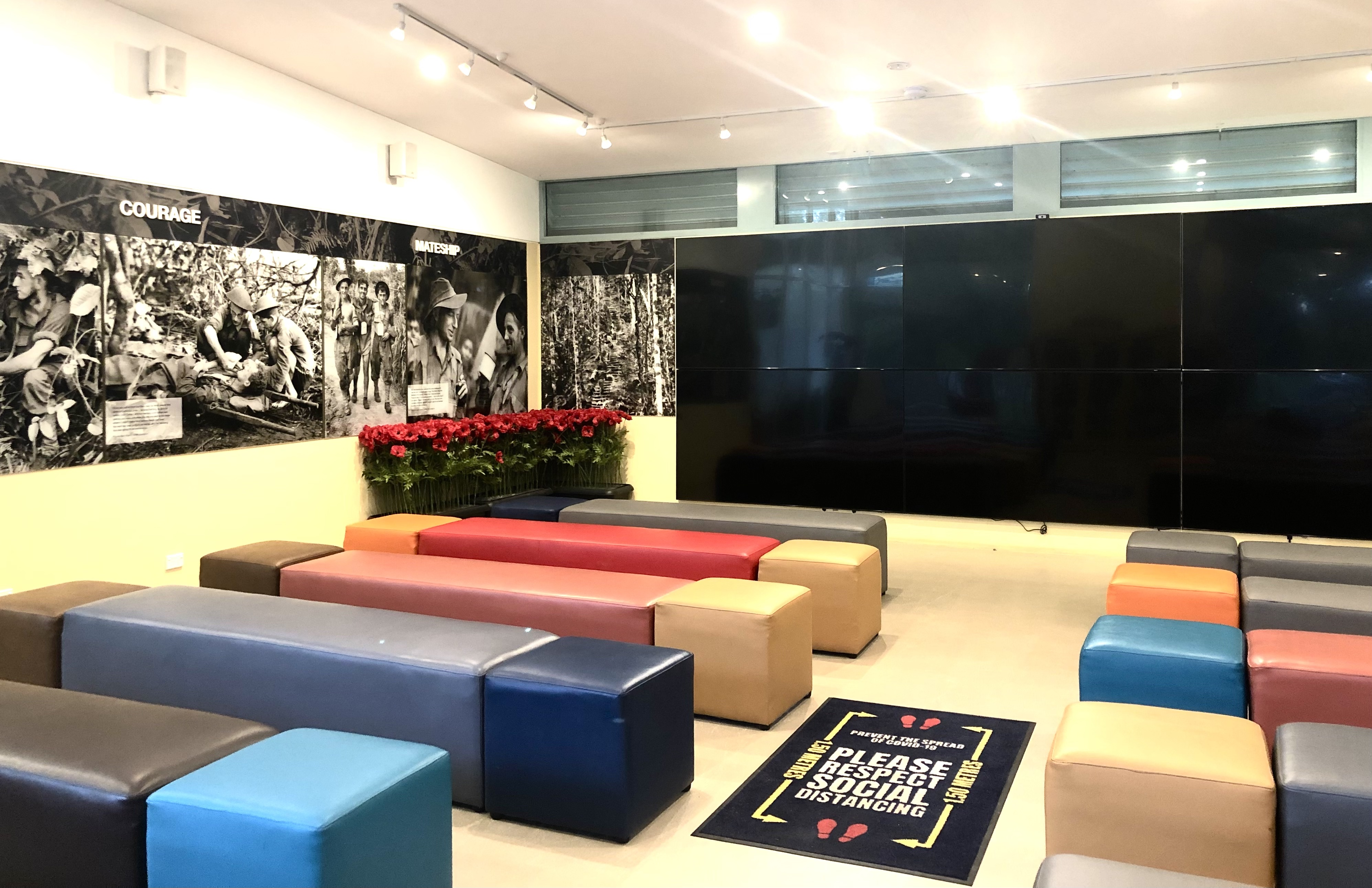
Interior shot - Ralph Honner Kokoda Education Centre

== See also ==
- Kokoda Track campaign
- Kokoda Track
- 39th Battalion (Australia)
- Fuzzy Wuzzy Angels
