= Herbert Thomson Kienzle =

Australian Army officer

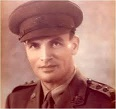
- Born: 19 May 1905; Levuka, Ovalau, Fiji
- Died: 7 January 1988 (aged 82); Sydney, New South Wales
- Military career
- Allegiance: Australia
- Branch: Australian Army
- Service years: 1942–1945
- Rank: Captain
- Service number: P461, PX177
- Units: Australian New Guinea Administrative Unit; 7th Division
- Conflicts: Kokoda Track campaign Battle of Buna–Gona
- Awards: Commander of the Order of the British Empire (Civil); Member of the Order of the British Empire (Military); Papua New Guinea Independence Medal; Mentioned in Despatches
- Other work: Plantation owner, airline operator, bank director

Captain Herbert Thomson "Bert" Kienzle CBE (19 May 1905 – 7 January 1988) was an Australian soldier and plantation owner from the Territory of Papua. He is notable for his contribution as officer in charge of native labour supporting Australian forces fighting along the Kokoda Track. He identified and named the dry lake beds, Myola, that were to become an important supply dropping area and staging point during the Kokoda Track campaign. In later life, he was recognised for his contribution to the development of Papua New Guinea.

== Early life ==
Herbert Thomson "Bert" Kienzle was born on 15 May 1905 at Levuka on the island of Ovalau, Fiji. He was the eldest of four children born to Alfred Kienzle, a German national and Mary (née Wilson). Mary was the daughter of an English father and a Samoan mother. She died in 1914 after giving birth to a son. The following year, Alfred was remarried to an Australian, Mena Hallet "Hally" Pearse. In 1916, Alfred was interned as an enemy alien, despite being a naturalised British subject at the time. In late 1917, the family was sent to Bourke, Australia, where they joined Alfred, before being sent on to Molonglo. Despite these experiences, Kienzle was patriotically Australian.

In 1920, aged 14, Bert was sent to Germany to live with relatives. He returned to Australia in 1925. In 1927, Kienzle took up a position with Papuan Rubber Plantations Pty Ltd, as an overseer on one of their plantations in Papua New Guinea. Advancing to plantation manager, Kienzle took up a position, in 1933, as an assistant manager with a gold mining company operating in the Yodda Valley – a tributary of the Mambare River near the outpost of Kokoda, which was about 10 kilometres (6 mi) to the south-east of the valley. On 4 June 1936, Kienzle was wed to Meryl Holliday, a former opera singer and nurse he had courted while on leave in Sydney the previous year. In 1937, Kienzle took up an agricultural lease in the vicinity of the goldfield, which he planted to rubber, while continuing as manager of the gold mine. Kienzle was an adept manager but his success derives from what appears to be a gift with language, cultural awareness and an empathy for his workers by which he was able to obtain much greater productivity from his labour force than many of his contemporaries.

== World War II ==
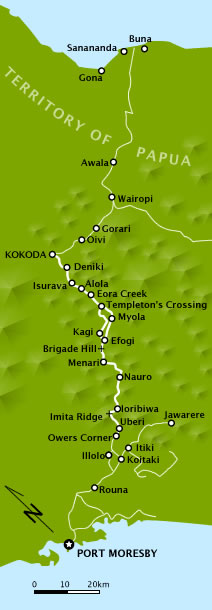
The Kokoda Track

With the outbreak of war with Japan in December 1941, Kienzle evacuated his family and reported to Brigadier Basil Morris but was advised to "return to Yodda and carry on operations awaiting further orders." On 25 January, an order was issued "calling up" all "able-bodied white men". Withstanding this, Kienzle was directed to continue operating the mine until the end of March, when he was ordered to wind up operations and report to Port Moresby, enlisting on his arrival, with the rank of warrant officer.

New Guinea Force Instruction No 13 assigned to Australian New Guinea Administrative Unit (ANGAU) the task of, "the construction of a road from McDonald's [Corner (just beyond Ilolo)] to Kokoda and the maintenance of supplies to the forces of the Kokoda District. ... The road was to be commenced no later than 29 June [1942]." ANGAU was responsible for the recruitment and management of Papuan labour in support of the Allied war effort. Newly promoted to lieutenant, Kienzle was assigned this task.

Of the plan to build a road, Bert Kienzle later said, "Some twit at headquarters had looked at a map and said 'We'll put a road there'." It has been described as a "pipe dream". Historian, Peter Brune describes it as "one of the most ludicrous" orders ever given. Author, Peter Fitzsimons, reports that Morris, now Major General, commander of New Guinea Force, "just didn't want to hear" that the task exceeded reasonable expectations, "So after a little argy-bargy the senior man had pulled rank and ordered Kienzle, as a bare minimum, to evaluate it." Lieutenant Noel Owers, a surveyor with New Guinea Force, had been given the task of surveying a route to Kokoda. Owers prepared a report outlining a route to Kagi (about halfway to Kokoda). (Note: The plan was cancelled when the extent of resources required was realised. Extension of the jeep track from Illolo to Nauro, about two-thirds the way to Kagi, was begun instead. By the end of September 1942, the road had only been developed as far as Owers’ Corner, before this plan too was cancelled. Owers' Corner is 61 kilometres (38 mi) from Port Moresby. Just over 11 kilometres (6.8 mi) of road was completed. The Kokoda Track Commemorative web site and James give a cross-section of the track. The cross-section gives some understanding of the enormity of the task, particularly when compared with the extent of work that was actually completed.)

Kienzle arrived at Illolo, to take charge of the 600 or so natives that had been conscripted for the task from indentured plantation labour in the local area. Captain "Doc" Vernon (Note: Capt Geoffrey H. Vernon, MC, P390. (1st AIF, Regimental Medical Officer, 11th Light Horse Regiment) Medical practitioner and planter; of Daru, Papua; born Hastings, England, 16 Dec 1882. Died 16 May 1946. He was acutely deaf as the result of a shell burst during the First World War. Kienzle had formed a friendship with Vernon before the war. The two worked together closely throughout the campaign and were always conscious, despite the limitations of the situation, of those in their charge.) handed him a letter he had already passed through the chain of command expressing deep concern for health and hygiene at the camp. Kienzle was faced with a force that was sullen and unhappy. There was a high rate of desertion and intertribal violence threatened to flare. His first actions were to explain the task before them in their own language and then address the issues of accommodation and hygiene, after which morale of the force was greatly improved. Work then commenced on clearing the track forward towards Uberi (Owers' Corner).

With recent knowledge of the track, Kienzle was to guide B Company of the 39th Battalion, under Captain Sam Templeton, to Kokoda. This was in compliance with orders for the forward defence of Port Moresby centred on the Kokoda area under the code name "Maroubra". The company departed Illolo on 8 July 1942 and arrived at Kokoda on 15 July. (Note: Kienzle was to eventually traverse the route eight times in four months.) In the course of this journey, Kienzle identified staging points along the trail and began to establish supply dumps. Events quickly overtook the planned deployment, with the Japanese landing at Buna–Gona from 21 July 1942. Additional deployments were made to meet the threat of the advancing Japanese force and with this, the supply situation became increasingly critical. The carrier force was insufficient for the task. Attempts were made to supplement what could be carried forward by air drops. Unreliable maps or poor visibility in the drop zone meant that supplies were often misdropped. In heavily jungled areas, many supplies were lost. Parachutes were in limited supply. As a result, only essential equipment, ammunition and medical supplies were dropped with parachutes. Rations and other supplies were "free dropped". Packaging was primitive and inadequate. The rate of recovery was low and the rate of breakage high – on average, 50 percent. Kienzle recognised that a better drop zone was needed than what was afforded at either Efogi or Kagi. From pre-war flights across the Owen Stanleys, Kienzle recalled seeing an open area near the crest of the range. On 1 August, he set out from Isurava to find it. On 3 August, he identified the smaller of two dry lake beds, which he called Myola. (Note: It was named for the wife of his friend and commanding officer, Major Sydney Elliot- Smith. Myola is an Australian aboriginal word meaning "dawn of day". The second larger lake bed to the immediate north is referred to as Myola 2, with the smaller lake bed being sometimes known as Myola 1.) Kienzle immediately requested that dropping begin at Myola and set about establishing it as a supply camp. Author, Raymond Paull credits the discovery as being "the key to the conduct of the Kokoda campaign", while Peter Brune describes it as the "logistical turning point of the campaign".

During the campaign in the Owen Stanley Ranges, Lieutenant H T Kienzle was at HQ 7 Aust Div as OC Native Labour and has remained at Div HQ ever since in that appointment. In the march over the ranges, most arduous conditions were encountered. The rough and mountainous nature of the country made the work of the natives difficult and exhausting and only the skill, patience and perseverance of this officer were responsible for them continuing their tasks. He constantly cared for them and looked after them, and his efforts and ability are largely responsible for reducing the number of desertions to an absolute minimum. In conditions that were always arduous and trying, Lieutenant Kienzle always retained control of the situation. In his handling of natives upon whom the division relied for transportation of its stores and for evacuation of wounded, he contributed in no small degree to the success of the division. Lieutenant Kienzle is accordingly recommended for the MBE.
– Australian Military Forces award nomination.

In late September, he was appointed commanding officer, line-of-communication Kokoda and attached to Headquarters 7th Division. During the Australian advance, Kienzle worked to improve the supply situation by developing an air strip at Myola 2.

In recognition of his contributions, Kienzle was mentioned in dispatches, and awarded the MBE (Military Division) for his work in this capacity. Analysing the campaign, historian, Karl James, states, "The Australians also had the benefit of a better organised carrier and supply system. This was largely due to the efforts of one man, Lieutenant Bert Kienzle."

He continued to serve along the Kokoda Track and at Buna–Gona, until he was evacuated sick on 22 December. He was promoted to Captain effective 16 January 1943. After leave in Australia, Kienzle was posted to Soputa as OC ANGAU Labour Mambare District. Kienzle applied to join the AIF for deployment overseas with the 7th Division. His application was declined in a reply dated 7 April 1944, which, ironically observed that he was too old to face the rigors of tropical warfare. He was, however, granted leave to be identified as a member of the AIF, in recognition of his service. He was discharged in December 1945.

Kienzle is credited with naming "Templeton's Crossing" in memory of Templeton, who was killed during the fighting around Kokoda. In a contemporaneous newspaper article, he was described as "the man who blazed the Kokoda Trail". In an article appearing at the time of the 25th anniversary commemorations, he was described as: "a key man in the jungle campaign". Author, Peter Fitzsimons observed that: "Kienzle's facility with the natives was crucial because they were indeed particular and they would provide the key manpower" for the campaign. Author, Peter Brune, having already made a dedication to the contribution of Kienzle in naming a chapter of his book "Bert and the Doc", went on to say: "We have seen the enormous contribution of Bert Kienzle. It is all too easy to isolate his effort in one chapter. His contribution was ongoing and insistent". Karl James said of Kienzle: "[He] was one of the outstanding Australian personalities of the campaign." He goes on to reiterate the sentiment of fellow historian, Alan Powell, who considered that, "no man on the Kokoda Track did more to ensure the Australian victory than Kienzle." (Note: Author, Paul Ham, said of Kienzle: "a man who merits profound gratitude for his contribution to the Australian war effort.")

== Later life ==
Following the war, Kienzle rebuilt his home and worked to re-establish his agricultural holdings, introducing Angus cattle in 1952 to diversify his operation. At one time, he owned Papuan Airlines and served as a director of the Papua New Guinea Development Bank. He sought to have the wartime contributions of the indigenous population more fully recognised. He was instrumental in having a monument commemorating the contribution of the native carriers erected at Kokoda. It was officially unveiled on 2 November 1959, 17 years after the retaking of Kokoda by Australian forces. (Note: In his report, James states that Kienzle both initiated and funded the memorial.) He worked closely with Brigadier Sir Donald Cleland and Lady Rachel Cleland to have a monument erected to honour those Papuan and New Guinea servicemen, police and carriers who served during the campaign in Papua New Guinea. It was unveiled at Three-Mile Hill, Port Moresby, on 3 November 1967, as part of the 25th Kokoda anniversary commemorations. He was made a Commander of the Order of the British Empire in 1969 for services to private enterprise and the country. In early 1973, he instigated and sponsored the Annual Kokoda Trail Race.

As a result of reforms following independence in 1975, his plantation estate was compulsorily acquired in 1979. He retired to properties at Tweed Heads, New South Wales and Allora (near Warwick, Queensland), Australia. He died on 7 January 1988 while on a visit to Sydney. He was cremated and his ashes interred at Allambe Gardens on the Gold Coast. He was survived by his wife and four of their five children: Katherine "Mary" Hardy, Diane Moloney, Jokn ("JK"), and Wallace ("Soc"). Their eldest son, Carl had died as a result of burns in 1947.

In 1995, the Australian Prime Minister, Paul Keating, opened the Herbert Kienzle Memorial Museum at Kokoda, as part of a set of facilities jointly funded by the government and Rotary International.

== See also ==
- Kokoda Track campaign
