= Repatriation General Hospital, Daw Park =

- Location within South Australia

Geography
- Location: 216 Daws Rd, Daw Park, South Australia, Australia
- Coordinates: 34.990334°S 138.592081°E

History
- Founded: 1942
- Closed: 2017

Links
- Website: sahealth.sa.gov.au
- Lists: Hospitals in Australia

The former Repatriation General Hospital, commonly referred to as The Repat or just Repat, was a hospital in Adelaide, South Australia, located in the inner-southern suburb of Daw Park. After complete closure in 2017, and followed by extensive refurbishment, it reopened as the Repat Health Precinct. Daw Park was an original bungalow on the site that became a hospice for many years.

== Background ==
The Repat was one of a number of Repatriation General Hospitals set up by the Commonwealth Government around the time of World War II to cater for returned serviceman. The various Repats were initially set up as Army hospitals before becoming Repatriation General Hospitals administered by the Repatriation Commission, (now called the Department of Veterans' Affairs). In general, health in Australia is a state government responsibility, and in the mid-1990s, the Commonwealth Government divested itself of these hospitals, and they became either public hospitals under state government administration, or private hospitals.

== History of the Repat ==
Construction was agreed by the South Australian Government in June 1940, with the intention of making it a repatriation hospital after the war. Cudmore House, a large bungalow and estate fronting onto Daws Road was commandeered under wartime regulations. The old house was renamed Daw House. Daw House was used as a hospice for many years.

The Repat was closed in December 2017. Very soon afterwards in 2018, a consultation process was carried out looking to reactivate the hospital, with the decision made to do so soon afterwards. The site underwent major reconstruction and modernisation to eventually reopen as the Repat Health Precinct.

A feature of RGH's 14-hectare (35-acre) complex was its easy accessibility and beautiful grounds.

A timeline of major events in the hospital's history follows:

- June 1940 – South Australian State Cabinet agreed to build a new army hospital.
  - Local architect Woods, Bagot, Laybourne-Smith and Irwin were commissioned to develop plans and oversee the building.
  - It was proposed that once the war was over, the hospital would become a Repatriation Hospital.
  - Cudmore Estate was obtained under wartime emergency regulations. The large bungalow style home at that time fronting onto Daws Road was called Cudmore House. It still stands today in Lancelot Drive.
  - Daw House commandeered
- 10 June 1941 – 105 Australian Military Hospital (105 AHM) formed. Temporary HQ set up in Daw House
- January 1942 – Building commenced.
- 20 January 1942 – Site formally handed over to the Army.
- 21 February 1942 – First patients admitted; the first wards were in tents and temporary huts.
- 22 August 1942 – Administration Services moved from Daw House to the newly completed A Block
- late 1944 – Last of the tents struck – "all 492 patients at that time housed more comfortably in completed buildings."
- February 2015 – South Australian Government announces closure as part of its Transforming Health Strategy.
- November 2017 – Last patients moved to other facilities and hospital closes.
- October 2018 – Consultation process into reactivating the hospital completed.

== Today ==
As of January 2023, the Repat Health Precinct includes a hospital ward known as the Bangka Strait Ward, as well as various other specialist units, such as the Specialised Advanced Dementia Unit.
