= Concord Repatriation General Hospital =

Coordinates: 33.83743°S 151.09298°E

- Sydney Local Health District

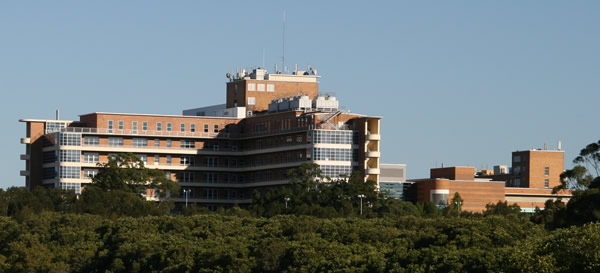
- CRGH Multi Building, viewed from the west across Brays Bay

Geography
- Location: Hospital Road, Concord, New South Wales, Australia

Organisation
- Care system: Medicare
- Type: Teaching
- Affiliated university: The University of Sydney

Services
- Emergency department: Yes
- Beds: 500
- Speciality: Burns, geriatrics, general medicine

Helipads
- Helipad: (ICAO: YXCC)
Number	Length		Surface
Number	ft	m	Surface
1			grass

History
- Founded: 1942; 84 years ago

Links
- Website: slhd.nsw.gov.au/concord

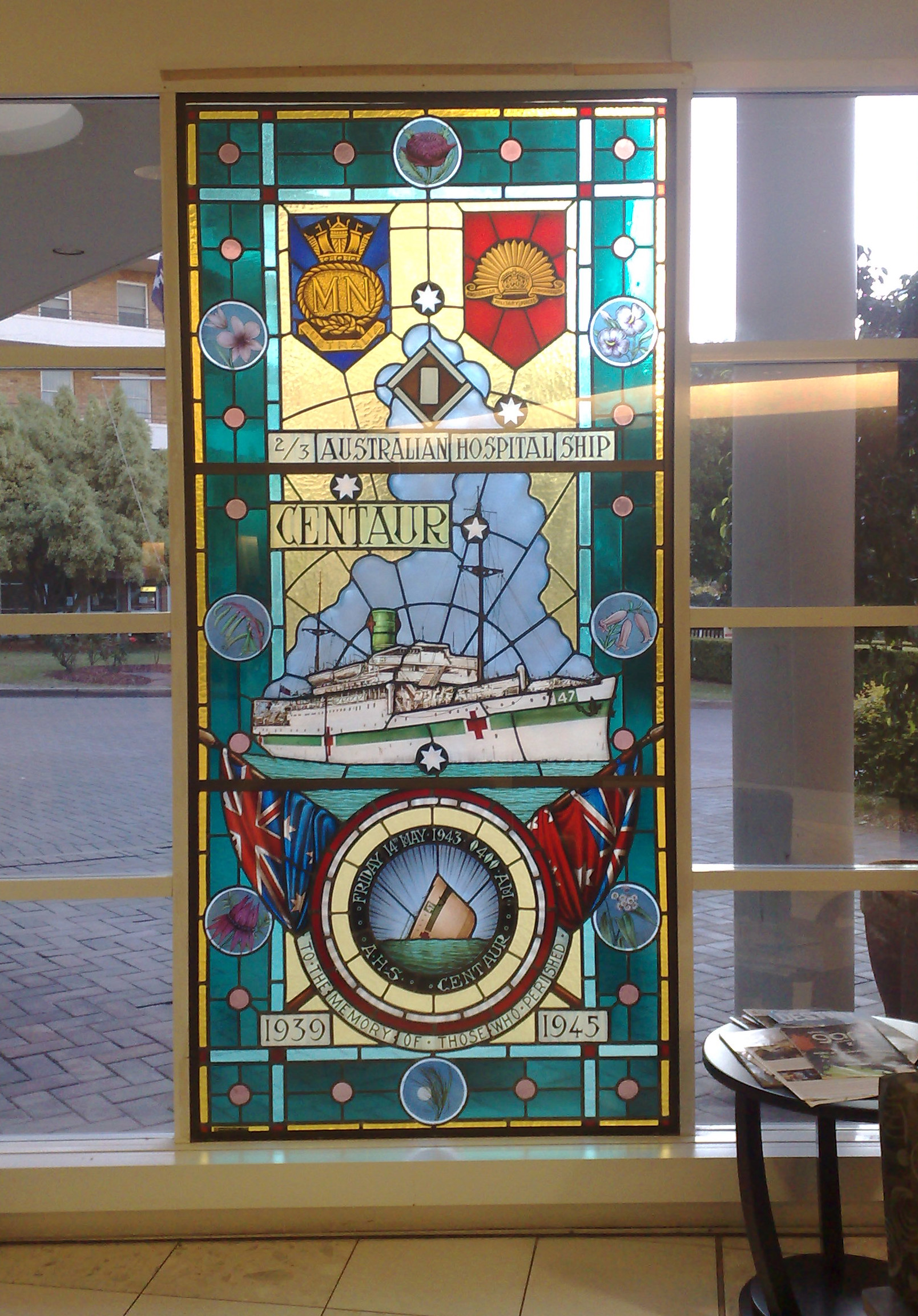
Stained Glass window of AHS Centaur at the hospital entrance.

Concord Repatriation General Hospital (abbreviated CRGH), commonly referred to as Concord Hospital, is a district general hospital in Sydney, Australia, on Hospital Road in Concord. It is a teaching hospital of Sydney Medical School at the University of Sydney, where it is referred to as Concord Clinical School, and a major facility in the Sydney Local Health District and the former Sydney South West Area Health Service. The NSW Statewide Severe Burn Injury Service and the Bernie Banton Centre, an asbestos diseases research institute, are located there.

Parts of the television series All Saints were filmed at CRGH.

== History ==
Prior to the Second World War, the 16-hectare (40-acre) Yaralla Estate on which the hospital is built belonged to philanthropist Thomas Walker and subsequently his daughter Dame Eadith Walker. A small hospital had already been established on the site, known as the Thomas Walker Convalescent Hospital. Following the death of Dame Eadith in 1937, the property was bequeathed to the Crown for development as a public hospital.

The current hospital was commissioned in 1939 as a general hospital for the Australian Army and opened on 11 March 1941. When completed in 1942, the 2,000-bed Yaralla Military Hospital (113th Australian General Hospital [A.G.H.]) was the largest hospital in the Southern Hemisphere. The main hospital building (currently known as the Multi Building) was one of the tallest buildings in Sydney when completed and its design won architects Stephenson & Turner the Sulman Award in 1946.

Following the war, the hospital became a repatriation hospital for returned servicemen under the jurisdiction of the Commonwealth government, with a change in name to Repatriation General Hospital, Concord (RGHC). In 1963, RGHC became a teaching hospital of the University of Sydney.

Recognising the growing community need, the hospital began providing care for general community patients in 1974, including the opening of an emergency department in 1977. In 1993, the hospital was transferred to the Central Sydney Area Health Service of the New South Wales Department of Health as a public hospital and renamed to the current Concord Repatriation General Hospital.

== Memorials ==
Although it is no longer under the jurisdiction of the Department of Veterans' Affairs, the hospital retains a historical significance to the veterans community in New South Wales. A number of memorials maintain these links, including:

- Australian Hospital Ship Centaur memorial, a stained-glass window adjacent to the main entrance of the hospital
- Kokoda Track Memorial Walkway and memorial rose garden, forming the major part of the designated route for commuting to/from Rhodes railway station.
- Anzac Day remembrance services

== Future ==
During mid-2006, construction work commenced on a new mental health precinct at the northern end of the hospital grounds. On completion the Sydney South West Area Mental Health Service (SSWAHMS) will relocate the majority of its existing services from The Rozelle Hospital to the new facilities at CRGH.

== Gallery ==
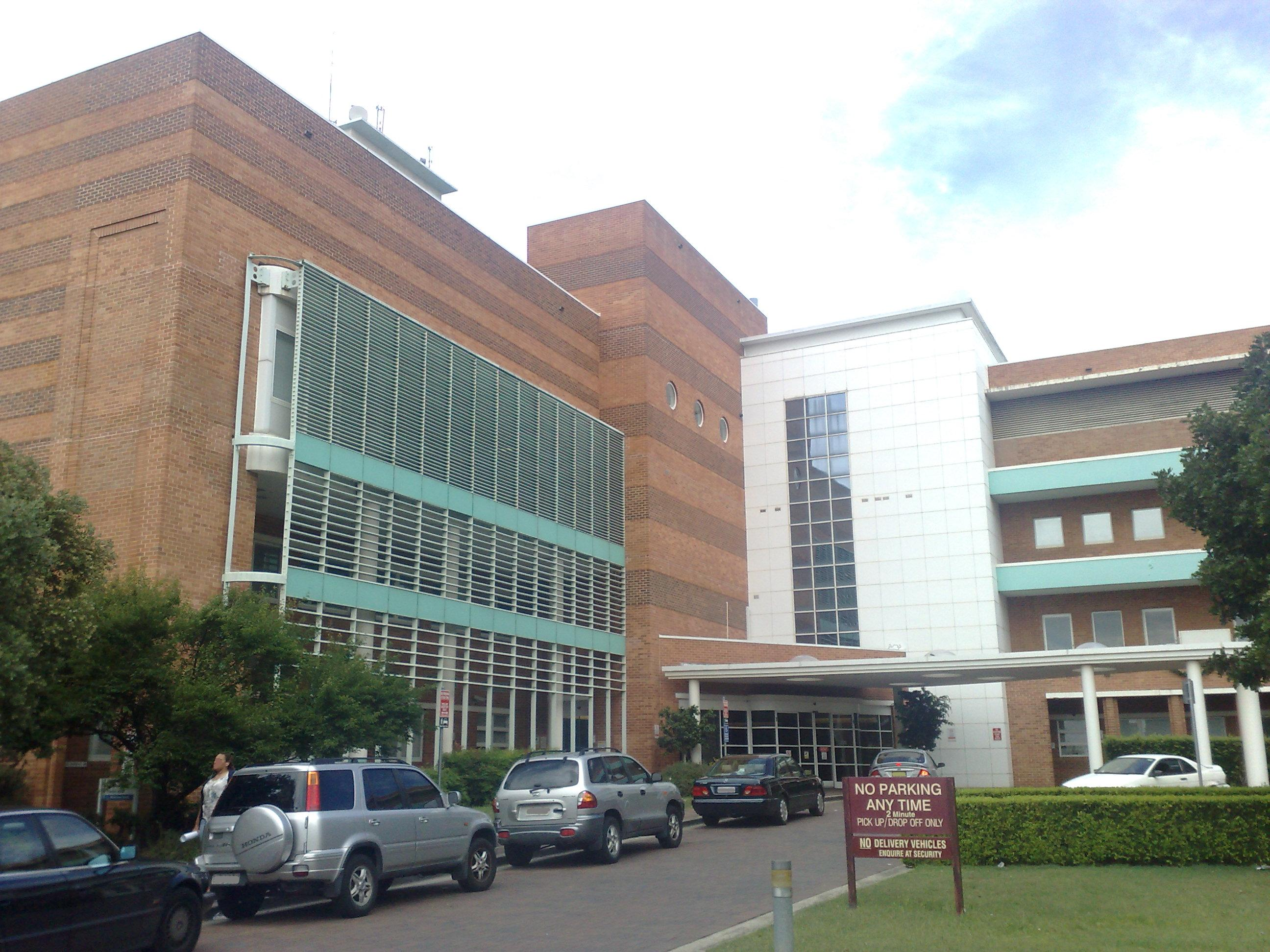
Concord Repatriation General Hospital Main Entrance

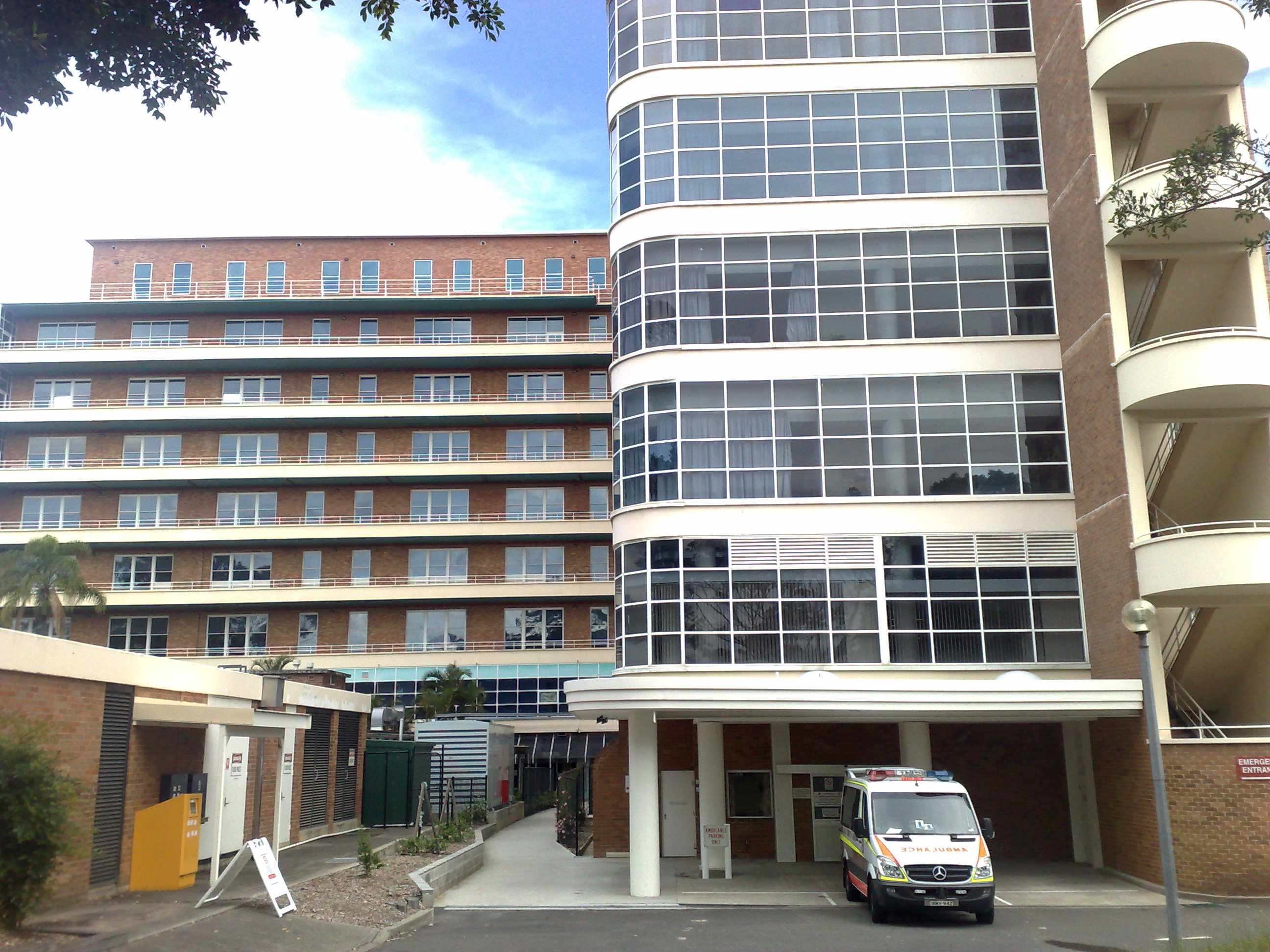
Concord Repatriation General Hospital Main Emergency Ambulance Entrance

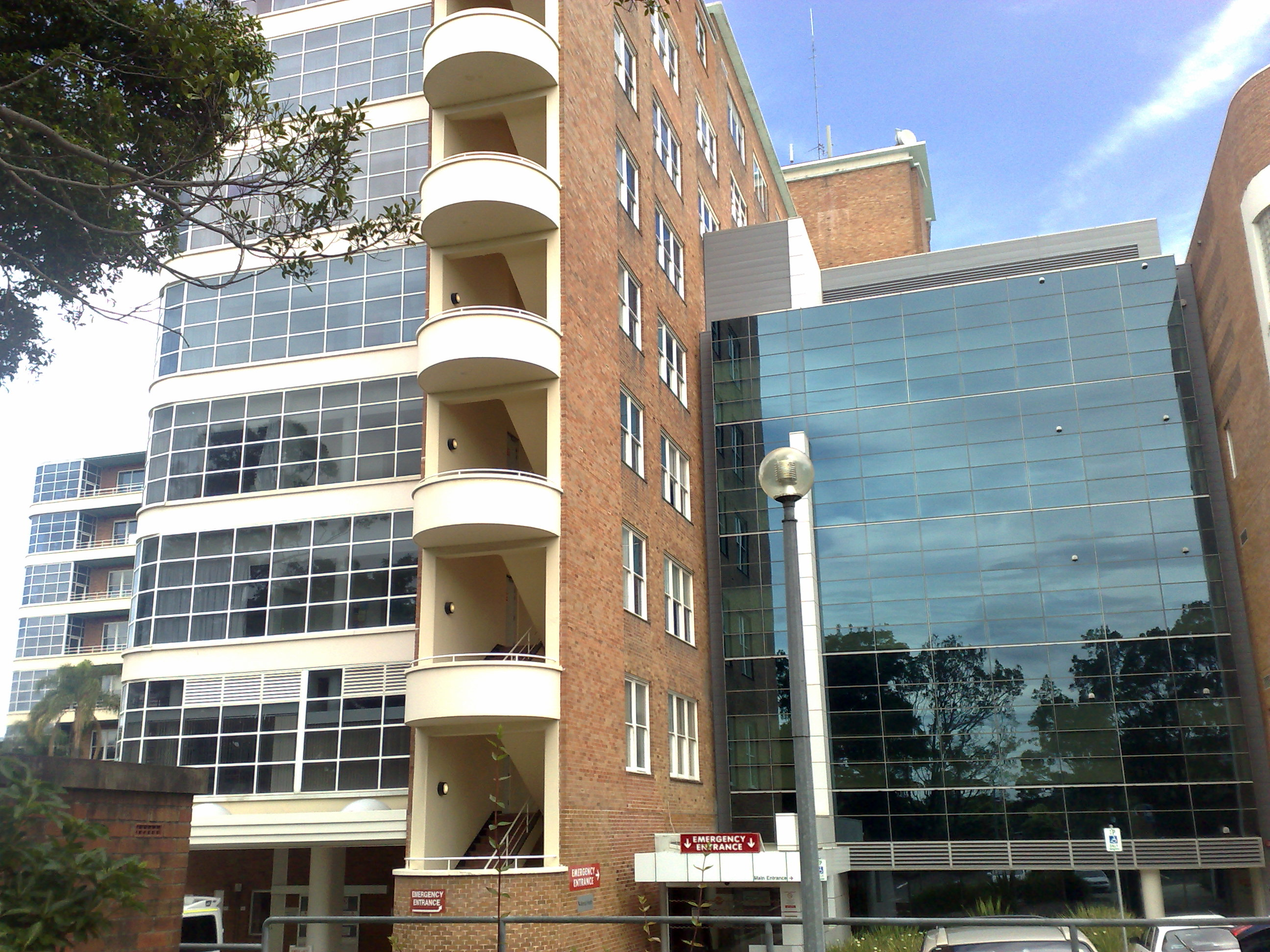
Concord Repatriation General Hospital Main Emergency Entrance

== See also ==
- Healthcare in Australia
- Lists of hospitals
- List of hospitals in Australia
- Repatriation General Hospital
