= Myola =

Dry lake bed in Papua Territory

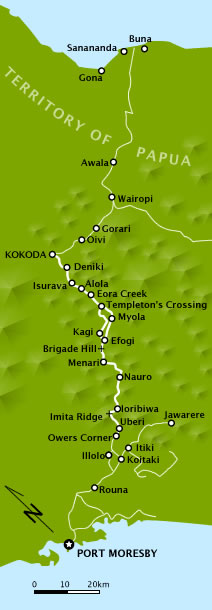
The Kokoda Track

Myola is a locality on the Kokoda Track in the Territory of Papua and the modern state of New Guinea. It is one of two closely located dry lake beds located near where the Kokoda Track crosses the crest of the Owen Stanley Range – also known as "the Gap" or "the Kokoda Gap". (Note: "The (Kokoda) Gap" is a dip in the Owen Stanley Range about 11 kilometres (7 mi) wide, convenient for aircraft crossing the range to pass through. Such was the ignorance of the terrain by Allied planners, that it was perceived to be a narrow defile that could easily be blocked by explosives or held against a determined enemy by only a small force.) Myola, the smaller of the two lake beds, was located and named by Lieutenant Bert Kienzle on 3 August 1943. It became a major resupply point and drop zone for Australian forces during the Kokoda Track campaign. Kienzle then cut a track toward Eora Creek which rejoined the original track at Templeton's Crossing, which he also named.

Myola was named (there being no local name) for the wife of his friend and commanding officer, Major Sydney Elliot-Smith. Myola is an Australian aboriginal word meaning "dawn of day". The second, larger lake bed to the immediate north is referred to as Myola 2, with the smaller lake bed being sometimes known as Myola 1. Myola 2 was developed as the major resupply point as the Australian forces advanced, following the Japanese forces as they withdrew from Ioribaiwa Ridge back toward Kokoda. A strip was developed at Myola 2, being a larger area but it was considered too risky for general use. Major General George Vasey landed at Myola 2 when he relieved Major General Arthur Allen on 28 October 1942.
