= Sam Templeton =

Samuel Victor Templeton
- Born: 1900; Belfast, Northern Ireland
- Died: 26 July 1942 (aged 41–42) near Kokoda, New Guinea
- Military career
- Allegiance: Australia
- Branch: Australian Army
- Rank: Captain
- Commands: 'B' Company, 39th Battalion
- Conflicts: Second World War; Kokoda Track campaign †

Captain Samuel Victor Templeton (1900 – 26 July 1942) was an officer in the Australian Army during the Second World War. He is well known for his actions with the 39th Battalion as the commander of 'B' Company during the First Battle of Kokoda and went missing in action on 26 July 1942 near the village of Oivi.

Templeton's Crossing was named in honour of Captain Sam Templeton. It is the first point where the Kokoda Track, from Port Moresby, crossed Eora Creek.

== Search for his remains ==
Wayne Wetherall, a PNG campaign historian and the founder of the Kokoda Spirit trekking company, travelled to Japan in 2009 to meet Kokichi Nishimura, one of the last survivors of the Japanese 144th Regiment to ask him about Templeton. Templeton's son Reg wanted to know what had happened to his father, as there had been various conflicting stories, none of which were confirmed. Nishimura believed that he had buried Templeton, and said that he had not been present at Templeton's death, but that he had been captured and, when interrogated before Lieutenant Colonel Hatsuo Tsukamoto, commander of the 144th regiment, lied and said, "There are 80,000 Australian soldiers waiting for you in Moresby," and laughed at Tsukamoto, who became enraged and killed him with his sword. Nishimura said that he later found the body with a sword or bayonet blade protruding from its side, and buried it because of the smell. Nishimura returned to PNG in 2010 at 90 years of age, and showed Wetherall the place at which he believed Templeton was buried, but no body was found there.
