= Repatriation General Hospital =

Repatriation General Hospital is or was part of the name of a number of Australian hospitals:

- Repatriation General Hospital, Concord (1947–1993), in the Sydney suburb of Concord, now Concord Repatriation General Hospital
- Repatriation General Hospital, Daw Park (1941–1995), in the Adelaide suburb of Daw Park (which has retained its name)
- Repatriation General Hospital, Greenslopes (1947–1995), in the Brisbane suburb of Greenslopes, now Greenslopes Private Hospital
- Repatriation General Hospital, Heidelberg (founded 1941), in the Melbourne suburb of Heidelberg, now Austin Hospital, Melbourne
- Repatriation General Hospital, Hobart (1921–1992), became part of Royal Hobart Hospital in 1992
- Repatriation General Hospital, Hollywood (1941–1994), in the Perth suburb of Nedlands, now Hollywood Private Hospital
- Repatriation General Hospital, Keswick (1919–1946), in the Adelaide suburb of Keswick

== See also ==
- Bundoora Park Homestead, repurposed as the Bundoora Repatriation Hospital from 1920 to 1993, in Bundoora, Victoria
- Lady Davidson Hospital, Turramurra, New South Wales (founded 1 January 1915)
- McLeod Repatriation Hospital (founded 1920)
- Repatriation Hospital, Kenmore, Queensland (1945–1994)
- [Repatriation] Outpatient Clinic, Keswick, South Australia (1946–1968)
- Repatriation Hospital 'Birralee', Belair, South Australia (1952–1976)
