= Mount Bellamy =

Mountain in Papua New Guinea

- Location within Papua New Guinea

Highest point
- Elevation: 2,250 m (7,380 ft)
- Coordinates: 9°03′S 147°41′E

Geography
- Location: Papua New Guinea

Mount Bellamy is a mountain in the Owen Stanley Range in south-eastern Papua New Guinea. The mountain rises to 2,250 metres (7,400 ft).
