= Kokoda Track =

Trail in Papua New Guinea

The Kokoda Track
- Length: 96 km (60 mi)
- Location: Papua New Guinea
- Trailheads: Kokoda / Owers' Corner
- Use: Walking
- Highest point: Mount Bellamy, 2,490 m (8,170 ft)
- Lowest point: Ua'Ule Creek, 300 m (980 ft)
- Difficulty: Hard
- Season: All
- Sights: WWII History, Jungle, Mountains

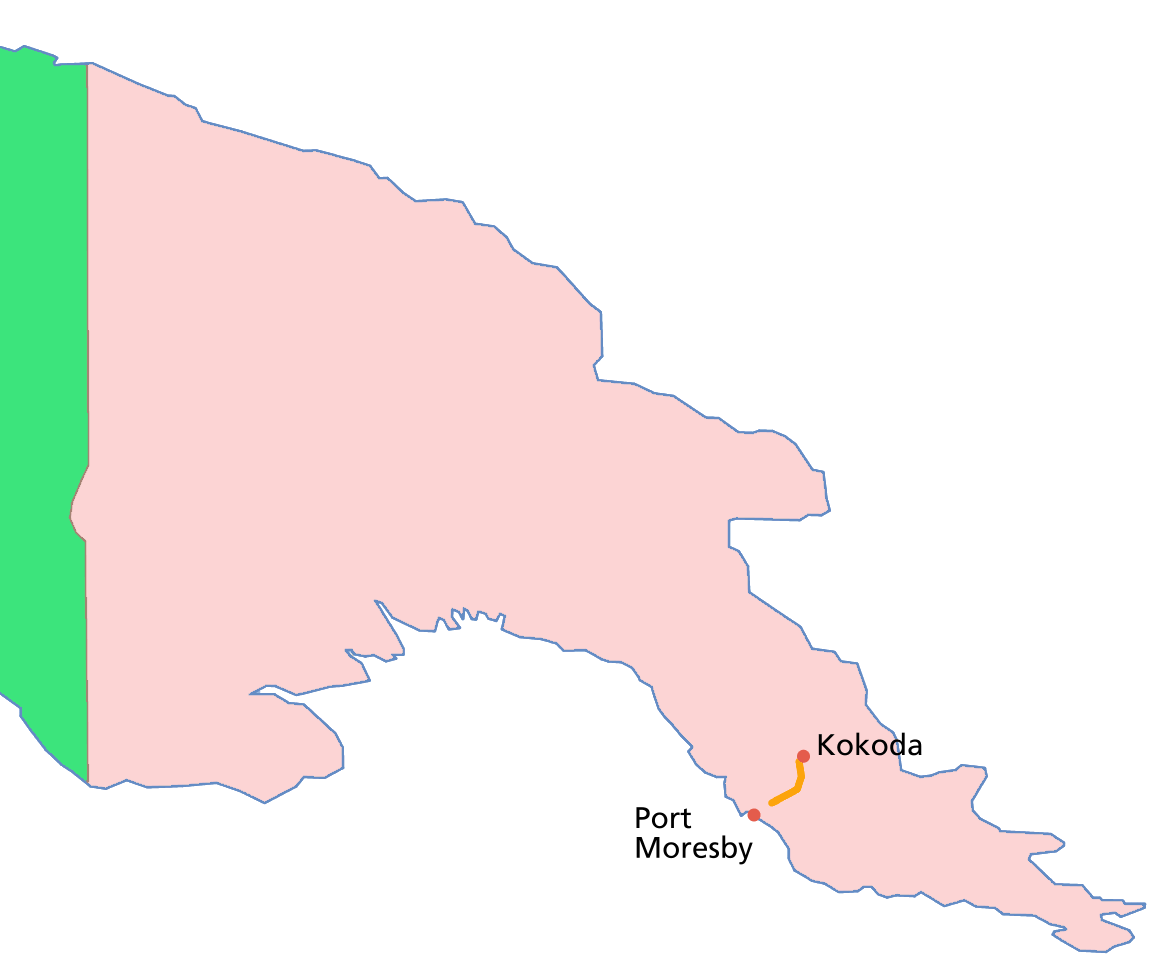
Location of the Kokoda Track within Papua New Guinea

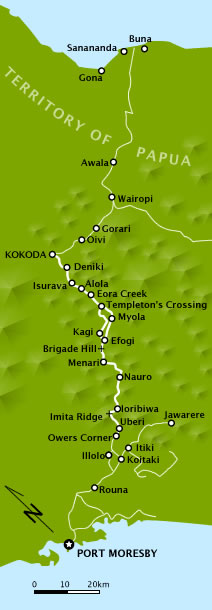
Map of the Kokoda Track as it was in 1942. The map is rotated to have NE bearing at the top of the page.

The Kokoda Track or Kokoda Trail is a single-file foot thoroughfare that runs 96 kilometres (60 mi) overland – 60 kilometres (37 mi) in a straight line – through the Owen Stanley Range in Papua New Guinea (PNG). The track was the location of the 1942 World War II battle between Japanese and Allied – primarily Australian – forces in what was then the Australian territory of Papua.

The track runs from Owers' Corner in Central Province, 50 kilometres (31 mi) east of Port Moresby, across rugged and isolated terrain which is only passable on foot, to the village of Kokoda in Oro Province. It reaches a height of 2,490 metres (8,169 ft) as it passes around the peak of Mount Bellamy. The track travels primarily through the land of the Mountain Koiari people.

Hot, humid days with intensely cold nights, torrential rainfall and the risk of endemic tropical diseases such as malaria make it a challenging trek. Hiking the trail normally takes between four and twelve days; the fastest recorded time is 16 hours 34 minutes.

== History ==
The track was first used by European miners in the 1890s to access the Yodda Kokoda goldfields. Between July 1942 and November 1942, a series of battles, afterwards called the Kokoda Track campaign, was fought between the Japanese and Australian forces. This action was memorialised in the newsreel documentary Kokoda Front Line!, filmed by cameraman Damien Parer, which won Australia's first Academy Award for its director Ken G. Hall in 1942.

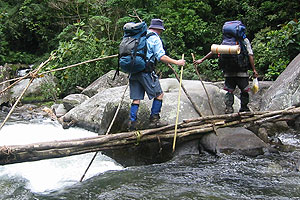
Crossing Eora Creek on the Kokoda Track

After the war, the track fell into disuse and disappeared in many places. John Landy, the long-distance runner, set a record of four days for the crossing using carriers and guides during the 1950s. In 1964, Angus Henry, the art teacher at Sogeri High School, with two of his students, John Kadiba and Misty Baloiloi, set a new record which was to stand until after the millennium by completing the journey in three and a quarter days without guides, carriers or any signposts or bridges.

In 2006, the Owen Stanley Ranges and Kokoda Track was included on the Tentative List for World Heritage along with three other sites from PNG. The 1.5 million hectare property is a mixed cultural and natural site covering a significant proportion of the Owen Stanley Ranges and including the Kokoda Track, Managalas Plateau and Mount Victoria and Mount Albert Edward region. The World War II battle sites were a key reason for cultural listing along with the unique cultures of the Koiari peoples. The Owen Stanley Ranges, through which the Kokoda Track passes, is one of the most biologically important areas in the Asia Pacific with over 4000 plant species and many endemic bird and animal species.

The Kokoda Track Foundation, established in 2003, helps villages along the track with education and healthcare. There is a proposal to turn the track into an Australian heritage destination on a par with ANZAC Cove at Gallipoli. Creation of the heritage area, is in part a response to the issue of an Australian gold mining company wanting to mine on or near the track. As of 2007, the idea was backed by the Australian government and Papua New Guinea's foreign minister.

In November 2007, Australian mining firm Frontier Resources announced plans to divert a section of the track to make way for a copper mine. The plan has the support of the local landowners and the Papua New Guinean government but has been criticised by trekking operators.

The track has been closed numerous times by villagers along the route in response to various grievances. In May 2009, villagers at Kovelo – near Kokoda village – blocked the track after complaints that money collected from trekking fees was not being distributed fairly.

=== Popularity and deaths ===
Number of walkers
Year	Walkers
2001	76
2002	365
2003	1074
2004	1584
2005	2374
2006	3747
2007	5146
2008	5600
2009	4366
2010	2871
2011	2914
2012	3597
2013	3246
2014	3167
2015	3167

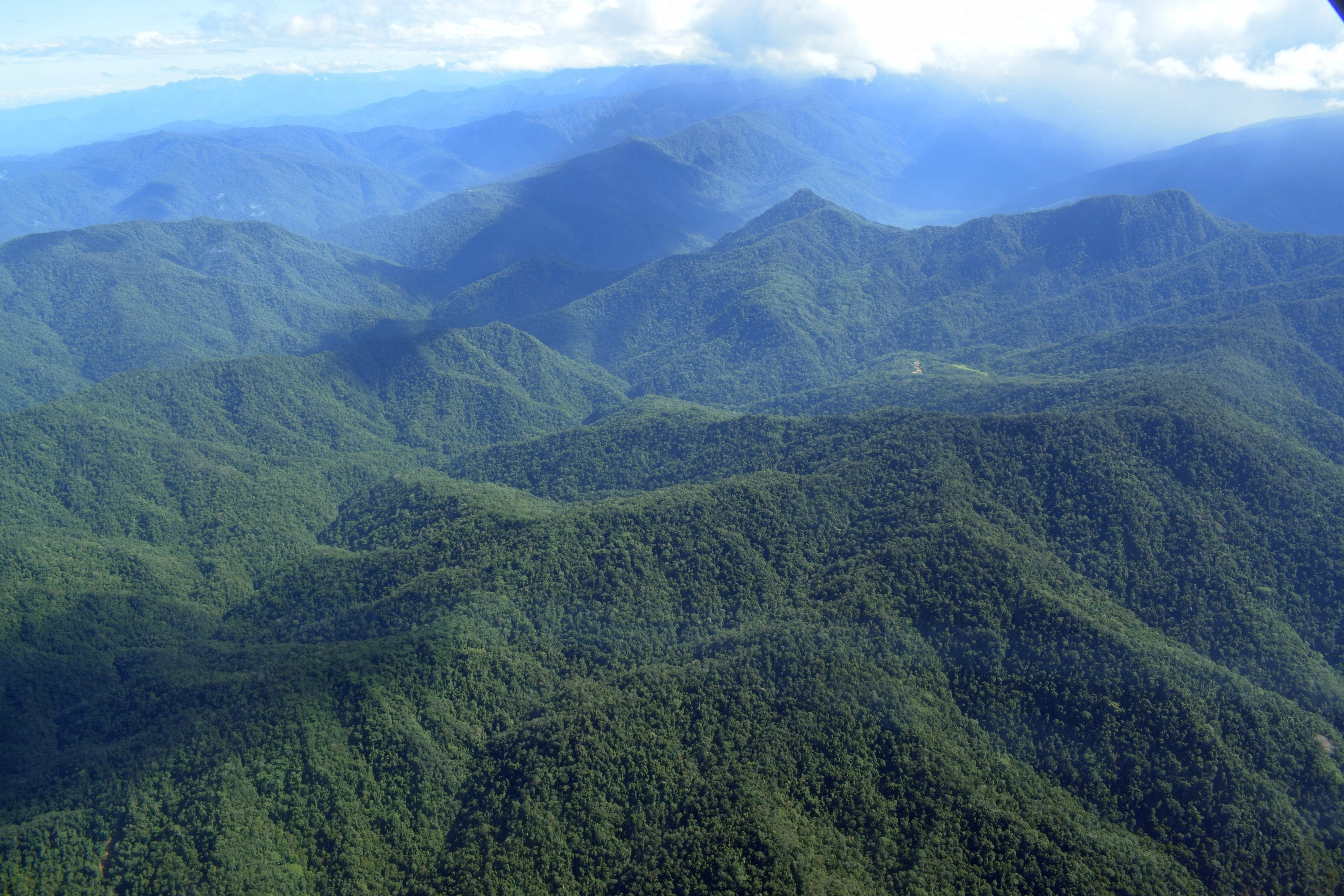
View from plane flying over the Owen Stanley Range from Kokoda back to Port Moresby

Since 2001, there has been a rapid increase in the number of people walking the track (see table at right). Six Australian trekkers have died from hyponatremia while attempting to walk the track. Four of those deaths occurred in 2009, with two in the same week in April and another two 8 days apart in September and October. The deaths have sparked calls for mandatory fitness tests for all walkers before starting.

As the trail's popularity increased, there were calls for more regulation of trek operators, with some operators taking as many as 150 walkers in a group. In response, the Kokoda Track Authority announced that from the beginning of 2010, tour operators would require a commercial licence.

In August 2009, a group of trekkers were killed when their light plane, Airlines PNG Flight 4684, crashed en route to Kokoda Station. All 13 people on board, including 9 Australian trekkers, were killed in the crash. As a result, the Australian Government committed $1.8 million to improve the safety of airstrips at Kokoda, Menari, Kagi, Melei, Efogi, and Naduri, villages located along the track. A second radio channel was also installed to deal with emergencies and maintenance work.

In October 2009, Don Vale became the oldest Australian (at 83) to successfully complete the Kokoda Track.

In November 2009, Australian paralympian Kurt Fearnley (born without the lower section of his spine) completed the track, crawling north to south, in 11 days. A multiple paralympic gold medalist (T54 Marathon in Athens and Beijing), he used customized shin pads and wrist guards. His journey was to raise awareness of men's health issues and was inspired by the story of Corporal John Metson, who crawled the track for three weeks, refusing the assistance of a stretcher on the grounds it would burden his comrades.

== Nomenclature ==
The monument at Owers' Corner

There has been much debate in Australia about whether it should be called the "Kokoda Trail" or the "Kokoda Track". The monument at Owers' Corner uses both terms: "Track" on one side and "Trail" on the other. The earliest mention of the route in an Australian newspaper may be in The Argus on Wednesday 29 July 1942 in a map when it refers to "the Buna Kokoda-Moresby track". "Kokoda Trail" was gazetted as the official name of the route by the Australian administration of Papua New Guinea in 1972.

According to historian Stuart Hawthorne, before World War II, the route was referred to as "the overland mail route" or "the Buna road". He states that "Kokoda Trail" became common because of its use in Australian newspapers during the war, the first known instance being in Sydney's Daily Mirror on 27 October 1942. However, all three terms Kokoda Track, Kokoda Trail and Buna-Kokoda road were commonly used during World War II in Australian newspapers from September 1942.

The diary of the Australian Army's 2/33rd Battalion records the route being officially designated as the "Kokoda Trail" in September 1942. The Australian Army has used "Kokoda Trail" as a battle honour since 1957. The Australian War Memorial (AWM) says that "trail" is probably of United States origin but has been used in many Australian history books and "appears to be used more widely".

Despite the historical use of "Trail", "Track" gained dominance in the 1990s, with the Australian Macquarie Dictionary stating that while both versions were in use, Kokoda Track "appears to be the more popular of the two".

== Trekking ==
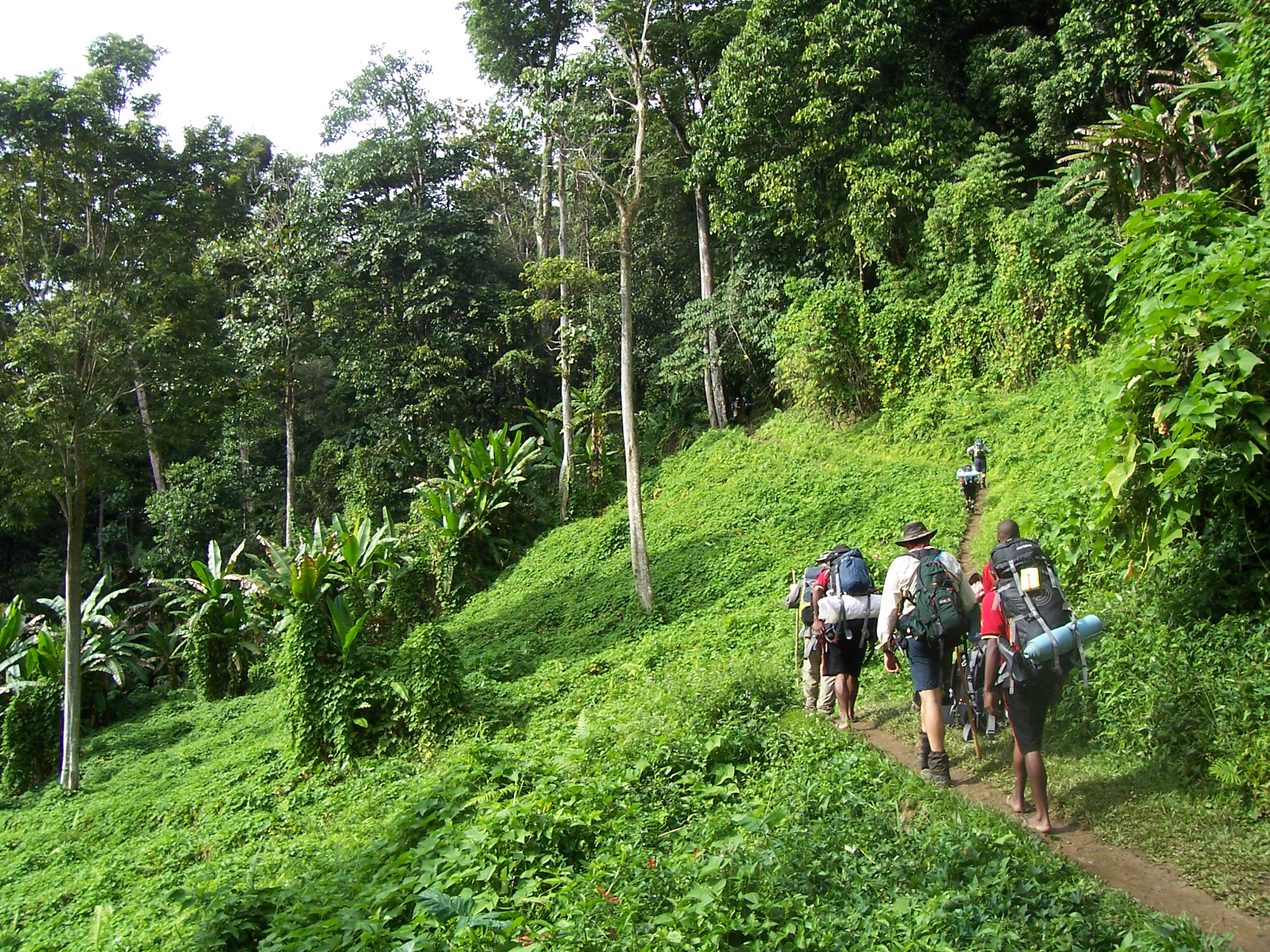
Walking the Kokoda track

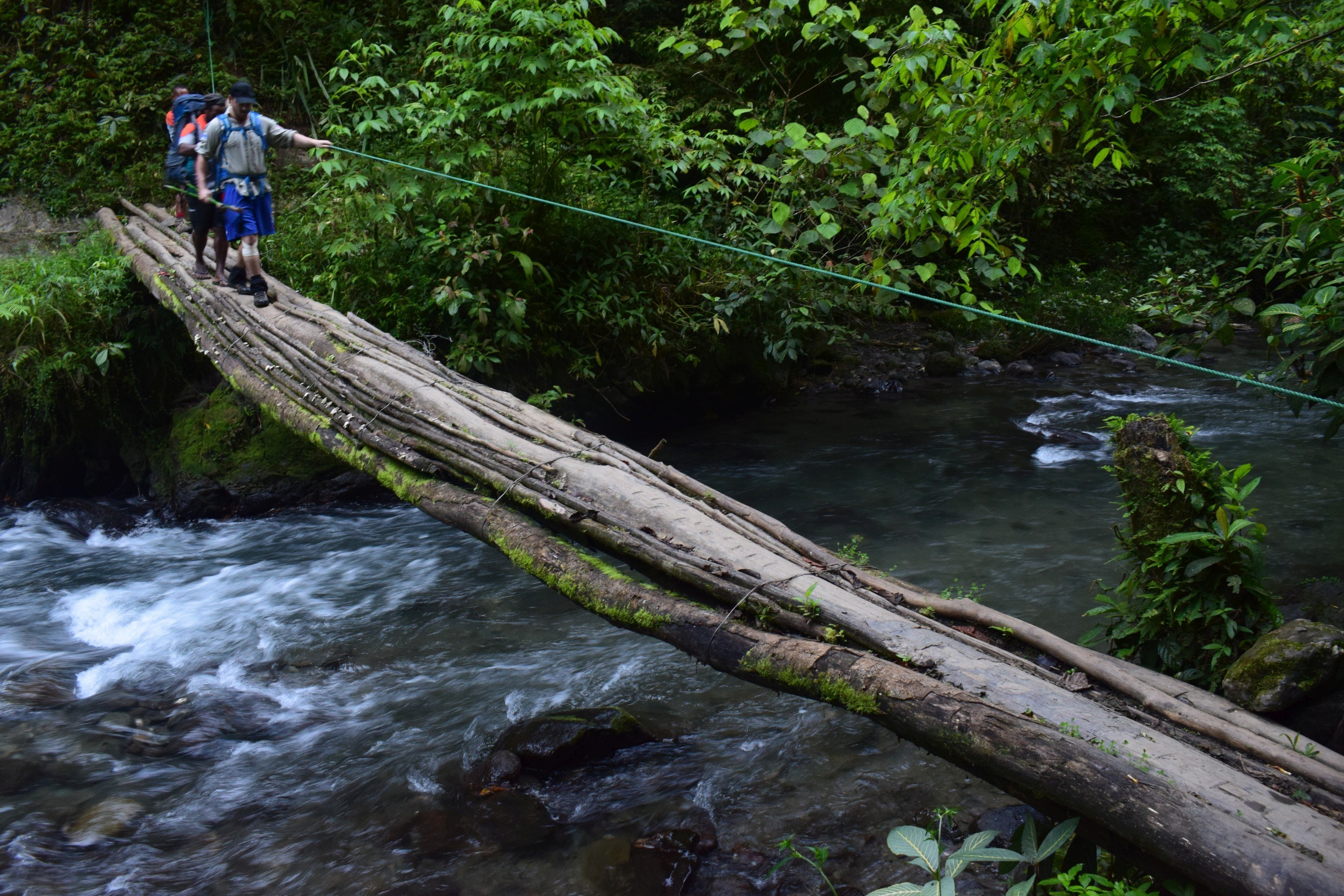
Crossing a bridge on the Kokoda Track

The track can be walked from either direction. It can take up to 12 days to complete, depending on fitness and rest time involved. Locals are renowned for being able to regularly complete it in 3 days. There are a number of guesthouses located along the way, some at villages and others at traditional rest spots. The main villages passed through (from Owers' Corner) are Naoro, Menari, Efogi Creek 1 & 2, Kagi or Naduri (if shortcut is taken), Alolo, Isurava, Hoi, Kovolo. Villagers are increasingly taking part in the commercial opportunities created by the growing number of tourists; in October 2006, some were known to be selling cans of soft drink and beer at double the price payable in Port Moresby.

The Kokoda Track Authority (the PNG Special Purpose Authority with responsibility for managing the Track) requires tour operators to hold a Commercial Operators Licence to lead treks along the Kokoda Track and purchase a trek permit. Licensed operators carry first aid kits, undertake first aid training, carry radios or satellite phones, respect the people who live along the Track and ensure their porters and guides are treated in a professional manner. A list of licensed operators is available on its website. Trekkers walking with unlicensed operators will be stopped by the KTA rangers and the local people.

== Kokoda Challenge Race ==
The Kokoda Challenge Race is an endurance running race that was revived on 27 August 2005. The race originally ran in 1975 but stopped before becoming an annual event.

The Kokoda Challenge inaugural race commenced in 2005. The current race record holder in both directions is Brendan Buka, with a best time of 16:34.05 in 2008 from Owers Corner to Kokoda and a time of 17:20 in the direction of Kokoda to Owers' Corner via Naduri.

Kokoda Challenge Race Records
Direction	Record holder	Record time	Year
Kokoda to Owers' Corner via Naduri	Brendan Buka	17:20	2007
Owers' Corner to Kokoda	Brendan Buka	16:34.05	2008
Kokoda to Owers' Corner via Kagi	Ramsy Idau	18:28	2012

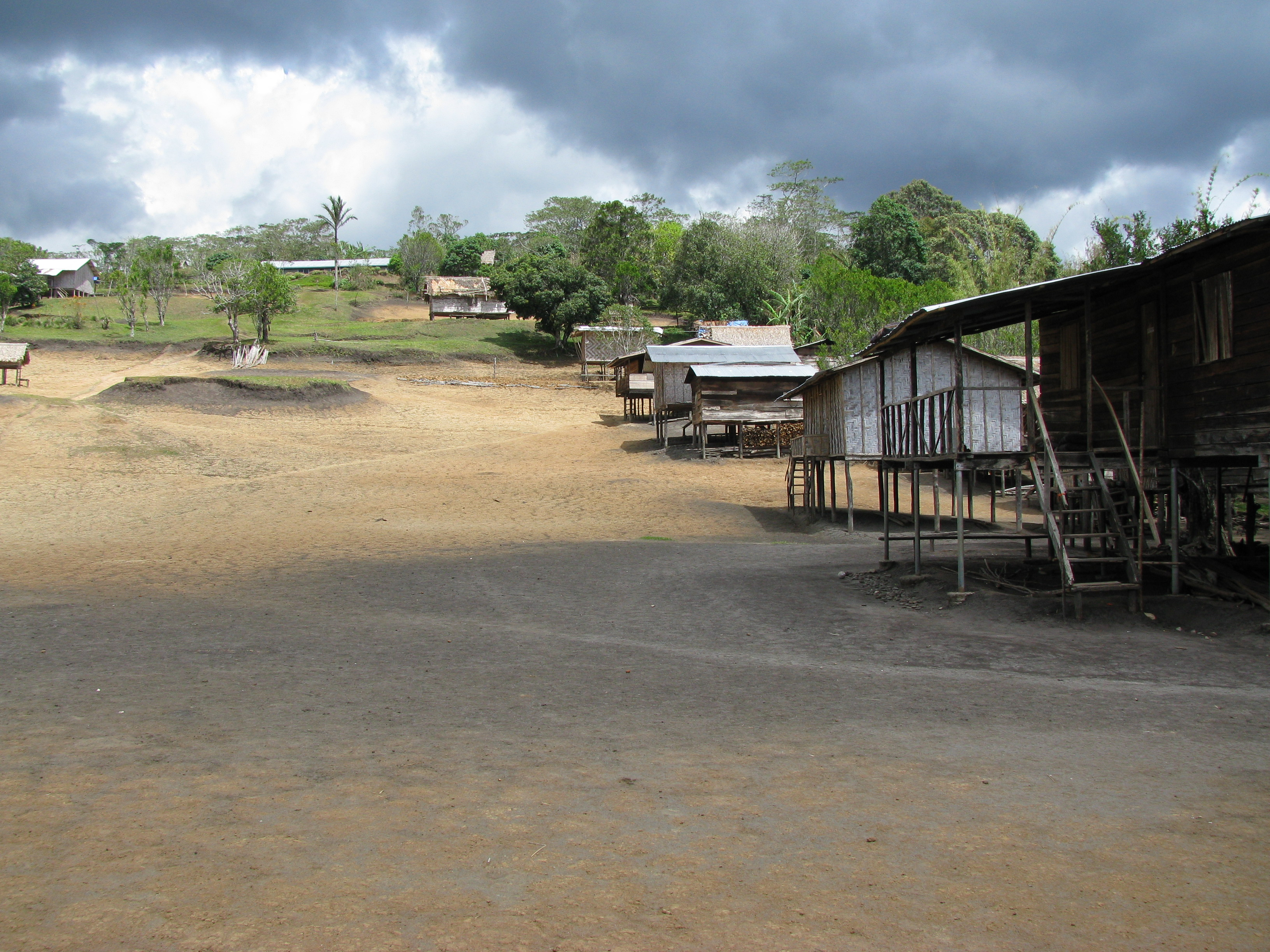
Naduri Village along the track

=== 2005 ===
The inaugural race of 27 August 2005 was won by John Hunt Hiviki, who completed it in 22 hours, one minute and 14 seconds.

=== 2006 ===
On 27 August 2006, Brendan Buka, a 22-year-old Papua New Guinean trekking porter from Kokoda, conquered the trail from Owers' Corner to Kokoda in a winning time of 17 hours, 49 minutes and 17 seconds. A Sydney engineer, Damon Goerke, 32 became the first Australian to run the track in under 24 hours, coming third in the 2006 challenge with a time of just under 19.5 hours.

=== 2007 ===
The race record was again broken by Buka in the 2007 event when he completed the track in 17 hours 20 minutes on 26 August 2007, running in the reverse direction from Kokoda to Owers' Corner. The 2007 event also featured runners running from Owers' Corner to Kokoda and a winning time of 19 hours 9 minutes was set in this direction by Tom Hango. Megan Davidson, a trek leader with Back Track Adventures, was the first Australian female to run the track in 36 hours, coming 12th overall.

=== 2008 ===
On 31 August 2008, Buka once again set a new record, with a time of 16:34:05. The conditions were the worst that they had been in the three years that Buka had competed in the event. Wayne Urina, claiming second place, is currently the second fastest man to complete the crossing of the Kokoda Trail with a time of 18:34:06. Cyprian Aire came third with 19:11:40.

=== 2011 ===
In 2011, the Kokoda Challenge Race was run on 27 August. The race started from Owers' Corner and finished at the new Kokoda Archway. The race was organised and sponsored by Kokoda Trekking. Brendan Buka once again won the race in a time of 17:50:33 but did not break his 2008 record.

=== 2012 ===
The Kokoda Challenge Race in 2012 was run on 25 August. The race began from the Kokoda Archway and went for the first time via Kagi Village to Owers' Corner. The race was once again sponsored by Kokoda Trekking. The winner was trail porter Ramsy Idau of Kokoda, with a time of 18:28:00. Prize money was set at K10,000 PNG Kina. The race saw for the first time two Japanese runners competing against the eight Australians and 22 Papua New Guineans, on the 70th anniversary of the Kokoda Campaign. The two Japanese runners, Makoto Yoshimoto and Yukiya Higuchi finished in a time of 42:56:36.

== See also ==
- Kokoda Track Memorial Walkway
