= List of University of Melbourne people =

This is a list of University of Melbourne people, including alumni and staff.

== Alumni ==
=== Academia ===
- Sir John Behan, educator; Australia's first Rhodes Scholar
- Geoff Bowker, professor of informatics at the University of California, Irvine
- Alec Broers, Baron Broers, electrical engineer, former Vice Chancellor of the University of Cambridge
- Karen Burns, architectural historian
- Joseph Camilleri, professor at La Trobe University
- Simon Chesterman, Dean of Law at the National University of Singapore
- Michael Clyne, linguist
- Greg Craven, Vice-Chancellor of Australian Catholic University
- John Deeble, architect of Medicare Australia
- Richard Dowell, audiologist, academic and researcher
- Ding Dyason, medical historian
- Alan Ebringer, immunologist, professor at King's College in the University of London
- Arie Freiberg, AM, legal academic
- Germaine Greer, feminist
- Maria Gough, art historian at Harvard University
- Bella Guerin, educator and activist; first female university graduate in Australia
- John Alexander Gunn, philosophy professor
- Peter Karmel, former vice-chancellor of Australian National University and Flinders University
- Hugh Gemmell Lamb-Smith, Australian educator; landed at Anzac Cove on 25 April 1915.
- Arthur Lucas, principal of King's College London (1993–2003)
- Robert Manne, professor of politics at La Trobe University
- Samaresh Mitra, bioinorganic chemist, Shanti Swarup Bhatnagar laureate
- Jennifer McKay, Professor of Business Law at the University of South Australia
- Peter McPhee, Provost of the University of Melbourne
- Fulvio Melia, professor of physics and astronomy at the University of Arizona and associate editor of the Astrophysical Journal
- Bruce Mitchell, fellow of St Edmund Hall, Oxford
- David S. Oderberg, professor of philosophy at the University of Reading
- Richard G. Pestell, Executive Vice President at Thomas Jefferson University, Philadelphia USA
- Abbas Rajabifard, professor and head of the Department of Infrastructure Engineering in the Melbourne School of Engineering
- Michael Roe, historian
- John Ralston, physical chemist and researcher at the UniSA
- David Shallcross, chemical engineer
- James Simpson, Harvard University professor
- Alexander Smits, Eugene Higgins Professor of Mechanical and Aerospace Engineering at Princeton University
- John Tasioulas, Professor of Ethics and Legal Philosophy, Oxford University
- Gillian Triggs, international legal academic and President of the Australian Human Rights Commission
- Frances Valintine, education futurist
- Sally Walker, Vice-Chancellor of Deakin University
- Frank T. M. White, Foundation Professor, Mining and Metallurgical Engineering, University of Queensland; Macdonald Professor of Mining Engineering and Applied Geophysics, McGill University

=== Architecture ===
- Douglas Alexandra
- James Birrell
- Gregory Burgess
- Bianca Censori
- Neil Clerehan
- Peter Corrigan
- Norman Day
- John Denton
- Roy Grounds
- Ellison Harvie
- John Hipwell
- Peter Ho
- Nonda Katsalidis
- Hijjas Kasturi
- Barry Patten
- Louise St John Kennedy

=== Business ===
- Leigh Clifford, Chairman of Qantas
- Robert Champion de Crespigny
- Margaret Dick
- Anthony Di Pietro, President of Melbourne Victory Football Club and CEO of Premier Fresh Australia
- John Elliott, President of Liberal Party of Australia & Carlton Football Club
- Aubrey Gibson
- Charles Goode, Chairman of Australia & New Zealand Banking Group
- James P. Gorman, Chairman and CEO of Morgan Stanley
- David Hains
- John Holland, founder of John Holland Group
- Margaret Jackson
- Ananda Krishnan, CEO, Usaha Tegas Sdn Bhd
- Hugh Morgan, former board member of the Reserve Bank of Australia
- Rupert Myer, director, Myer Family Company
- Richard Pratt
- James Riady, Chairman, Lippo Group
- Graeme Samuel
- Karl Siegling, funds manager
- Peter Smedley, CEO of Colonial Group, Mayne Nickless
- Evan Thornley, entrepreneur

=== Community activism ===
- Julian Assange, Wikileaks spokesperson and founder (did not graduate)
- Waleed Aly
- Lisa Bellear, Indigenous activist, broadcaster and poet (also worked as an Aboriginal liaison officer there between 1987 - 1995).
- Alex Dekker, Humanitarian
- Helen Durham, international humanitarian lawyer
- Lorna Lippmann, campaigner for the rights of Aboriginal Australians
- Avery Ng, Hong Kong activist

=== Government ===
==== Governors General of Australia ====
- Richard Casey, Baron Casey, 16th Governor-General of Australia (did not graduate)
- Sir Zelman Cowen
- Peter Hollingworth
- Sir Isaac Isaacs, also former Chief Justice of Australia
- Sir Ninian Stephen, also a previous Justice of the High Court of Australia

==== Governors of Victoria ====
- Alex Chernov,
- David de Kretser
- Sir James Gobbo, also a previous Justice of the Supreme Court of Victoria
- John Landy
- Richard McGarvie
- Sir Henry Winneke, also a previous Chief Justice of Victoria

==== Governors of other jurisdictions ====
- Sir Bede Clifford, Governor of The Bahamas, then Governor of Mauritius and then Governor of Trinidad and Tobago

==== Politicians ====
===== Prime Ministers of Australia =====
- Alfred Deakin
- Julia Gillard
- Harold Holt
- Sir Robert Menzies

===== Premiers of Victoria =====
- Ted Baillieu
- John Brumby
- John Cain II
- Rupert Hamer
- Sir William Irvine also a former Chief Justice of Victoria
- Joan Kirner
- William Shiels
- Lindsay Thompson

===== Premier of Queensland =====
- Thomas Ryan

===== Federal politicians =====
- Lyn Allison, former Member of the Australian Senate and leader of the Australian Democrats
- Richard Alston, former Member of the Australian Senate
- Kevin Andrews, Member of the Australian House of Representatives
- Bruce Baird, former Member of the Australian House of Representatives
- Maurice Blackburn, lawyer and former Member of the Australian House of Representatives
- Neil Brown, former Member of the Australian House of Representatives
- Anna Burke, Member of the Australian House of Representatives
- John Button, former Member of the Australian Senate
- Jim Cairns, former Deputy Prime Minister of Australia
- Sam Cohen, former Member of the Australian Senate
- Barney Cooney, former Member of the Australian Senate
- Mark Dreyfus, Member of Australian House of Representatives
- Gareth Evans, international policymaker, academic, and former Member of the Australian Senate
- John Alexander Forrest
- Petro Georgiou, former Member of Australian House of Representatives
- Andrew Giles, Member of Australian House of Representatives
- Ivor Greenwood, former Member of the Australian Senate
- Ray Groom, former Member of the Australian House of Representatives and Premier of Tasmania
- H. B. Higgins, former Attorney-General of Australia and Justice of the High Court of Australia
- Greg Hunt, Member of Australian House of Representatives
- Dennis Jensen, Member of Australian House of Representatives
- Barry Jones, AC former Member of Australian House of Representatives and Parliament of Victoria.
- David Kemp, former Member of Australian House of Representatives
- John Langmore, Member of Australian House of Representatives
- William Maloney, Member of Australian House of Representatives
- Richard Marles, Member of Australian House of Representatives
- Peter McGauran, former Member of Australian House of Representatives
- Kelly O'Dwyer, Member of Australian House of Representatives
- Andrew Peacock, former Member of Australian House of Representatives
- Sir Arthur Robinson, former Member of Australian House of Representatives
- Nicola Roxon, former Member of the Australian House of Representatives
- Roger Shipton, former Member of the Australian House of Representatives
- Bill Shorten, Member of Australian House of Representatives
- Bruce Smith, former Member of Australian House of Representatives
- Sir John Spicer, former Member of the Australian Senate
- Sid Spindler, former Member of the Australian Senate
- Lindsay Tanner, former Member of the Australian House of Representatives
- Ralph Willis, former Member of the Australian House of Representatives
- Agar Wynne, former Member of the Australian House of Representatives

===== Australian state and territory politicians =====
- Sir Clifden Eager former President of the Victorian Legislative Council
- Maurice Blackburn, lawyer and former Member of the Victorian Legislative Assembly
- John Bourke, lawyer and former Member of the Victorian Legislative Assembly
- Thomas Brennan, political journalist and former Member of the Victorian Legislative Council
- Bruce Chamberlain, former Member of both the Victorian Legislative Assembly and Council
- Robert Clark, former Member of the Victorian Legislative Assembly
- Neil Cole, former Member of the Victorian Legislative Assembly and playwright and researcher
- Robert Dean, former Member of the Victorian Legislative Assembly
- Frank Field, former Member of the Victorian Legislative Assembly
- John Galbally, former Member of both the Victorian Legislative Assembly and Council
- Matthew Groom, Member of the Tasmanian House of Assembly
- Ray Groom, former Premier of Tasmania and Member of the Australian House of Representatives
- Tim Holding, former Member of the Victorian Legislative Assembly
- Robert Wilfred Holt, Minister for Lands in the Cain government 1952–54
- Trevor Oldham, former Member of the Victorian Legislative Assembly, serving as Deputy Premier
- Herbert Postle, former Member of the Tasmanian House of Assembly
- Robert Ramsay, former Member of both the Victorian Legislative Assembly
- Edward Reynolds, former Member of both the Victorian Legislative Assembly
- T. J. Ryan, former Premier of Queensland
- Sir Arthur Rylah, former Member of the Victorian Legislative Assembly and Deputy Premier
- Prue Sibree, former Member of the Victorian Legislative Assembly
- Oswald Snowball, former Member of the Victorian Legislative Assembly, serving as Speaker
- Alan Stockdale, former Member of the Victorian Legislative Assembly, serving as Treasurer
- Shane Stone, former Chief Minister of the Northern Territory
- Richard Ward, QC, former Member of the Northern Territory Legislative Council and Supreme Court judge
- Sir Henry Wrixon, former Member of both the Victorian Legislative Assembly and Council
- Agar Wynne, former Member of the Victorian Legislative Council

===== International politicians =====
- Airlangga Hartarto, Coordinating Minister for Economic Affairs
- Kirsty Sword Gusmão, First Lady of East Timor
- Hun Many, Deputy Prime Minister of Cambodia
- Ismail Abdul Rahman, former Deputy Prime Minister of Malaysia
- Tajol Rosli Mohd Ghazali, former Menteri Besar of Perak
- Dato' Sri Mustapa Mohamed, Member of Parliament of Jeli, former Malaysian Minister of International Trade and Industry
- Baru Bian, Member of Parliament of Selangau, former Malaysian Minister of Works
- Raja Kamarul Bahrin, former Malaysian Deputy Minister of Housing and Local Government
- Mark Regev, spokesman for the Israeli Prime Minister

===== Public servants =====
- William Macmahon Ball, diplomat
- Jean-Pierre Blais, Canadian bureaucrat; Chairman of the Canadian Radio-television and Telecommunications Commission
- Peta Credlin, political advisor
- Francis Patrick Donovan, AM, diplomat and jurist
- Bill Paterson, Australian Ambassador to Republic of Korea; previously Australian Ambassador to Thailand and Australian Ambassador for Counter-Terrorism
- Trevor Ashmore Pyman, diplomat.
- John So, Lord Mayor of Melbourne
- Fred Whitlam, Crown Solicitor; father of Gough
- Danielle Wood, economist and incoming chair of the Productivity Commission
- Luke Lazarus Arnold, Australian diplomat

=== Humanities ===
==== Arts ====
- Angela Brennan, artist
- Steve Cox, painter and watercolourist
- John Dahlsen, environmental artist
- Hugh Davies, mixed media artist
- Lisa Gervasoni, artist
- Bill Henson, photographer and Venice Biennale representative
- Ali Hogg, photographer and activist
- Pamela Irving, artist and educator
- Anastasia Klose, video artist and Biennale of Sydney representative
- Brian McFarlane (BA & DipEd), film historian, writer, and educator
- Doris McKellar, photographer
- Azlan McLennan, artist and activist
- Lewis Miller, Archibald Prize winning painter
- Victor O'Connor, artist
- Daniel Palmer, historian, critic, academic, and theorist of contemporary art, photography, and digital media
- Shaun Parker, award-winning choreographer, founder of Shaun Parker & Company
- Stieg Persson, painter
- Patricia Piccinini, sculptor and Venice Biennale representative
- Van Thanh Rudd, artist and activist
- Anne-Louise Sarks, theatre director and writer
- Matt Scholten, theatre director, teacher and writer
- Ricky Swallow, sculptor and Venice Biennale representative
- Timothy James Webb, artist
- Bradd Westmoreland, artist
- Marcus Wills, Archibald Prize winning painter

==== Film and television ====
- Adam Arkapaw, cinematographer (True Detective, Animal Kingdom, Snowtown)
- Gillian Armstrong, director (Charlotte Gray, Little Women)
- Tony Ayres, Australian Film Institute award-winning director (The Home Song Stories, Walking on Water)
- Alison Bell, Australian Academy of Cinema and Television Arts Award nominated actor (I Rock, Laid)
- Tahir Raj Bhasin, Indian actor
- Jill Bilcock, Academy Award-nominated editor (Elizabeth, Moulin Rouge!, Red Dog)
- Hamish Blake, comedian (did not graduate)
- Cate Blanchett, actress (did not graduate)
- Jamie Blanks, director (Urban Legend, Valentine)
- John Bluthal, actor
- Sibylla Budd, actor and documentary presenter (All Saints, Sea Patrol, The Secret Life of Us)
- Ronny Chieng, actor/comedian (The Daily Show)
- Santo Cilauro, television and feature film producer
- Vince Colosimo, Australian Film Institute Award winning actor (Body of Lies, Chopper, Lantana)
- Maude Davey, actress and theatre director
- Marg Downey, comedian and actress
- Elizabeth Debicki, actress
- Adam Elliot, Academy Award-winning animator (Harvie Krumpet, Mary and Max)
- Alexander England, actor
- Alice Garner, historian, musician and actress
- Antony I. Ginnane, film producer
- Tom Gleisner, director, producer, writer, comedian, actor and author
- Libbi Gorr, comedian
- Barry Humphries, comedian
- Red Hong Yi, artist and architectural designer
- Sammy J, comedian
- Clayton Jacobson, director (Kenny)
- Justin Kurzel, director (Snowtown, Macbeth (2015), Assassin's Creed)
- Andy Lee, comedian
- Robert Luketic, director (21, Legally Blonde, Monster-in-Law)
- Catherine Mack-Hancock, actress
- Lara Jean Marshall, actress best known for her role on The Saddle Club
- Belinda McClory, actor and screenwriter (Acolytes, Blue Heelers, The Matrix)
- David Michôd, director (Animal Kingdom)
- Rhys Muldoon, actor
- Lloyd Newson, director, dancer and choreographer
- May Grace Parry, Burmese actress, model and winner of Miss Universe Myanmar 2026
- Michael Pattinson, producer (Ground Zero, Secrets)
- Hannie Rayson, Australian Writers' Guild Award and Sidney Myer Performing Arts Award winning playwright and actor (SeaChange)
- Glenn Robbins, comedian and actor
- Portia de Rossi, actress
- Pallavi Sharda, Indian actor
- Jonathan M. Shiff, Australian Film Institute and British Academy of Film and Television Arts award-winning producer (Ocean Girl, Thunderstone)
- Rob Sitch, co-writer and co-director of the movies The Castle and The Dish; co-host of The Panel
- Matt Scholten, director
- Simon Stone, director and actor
- Sam Strong, director, artistic director, Queensland Theatre
- Magda Szubanski, comedian and actress
- Nadia Townsend, actor and theatre director (City Homicide, Fireflies, Knowing)
- Andrew Upton, director and playwright
- Steve Vizard, television and radio presenter, lawyer, comedian, producer, author and screenwriter
- Luke Walker, director/producer (Beyond Our Ken, Lasseter's Bones)
- Sarah Watt, director and animator (Look Both Ways, My Year Without Sex)
- Angela White, pornographic actress, director
- Alison Whyte, Logie Award-winning actor (Frontline, Satisfaction)
- Geoffrey Wright, director (Macbeth (2006), Metal Skin, Romper Stomper)
- Julia Zemiro, television presenter
- Randeep Hooda, Indian actor
- Yashma Gill, Pakistani actor
- Lydia Zimmermann, director (Aro Tolbukhin. En la mente del asesino)
- Ashley Zukerman, Logie Award nominated actor (Lowdown, The Pacific, Rush)

==== History ====
- Geoffrey Blainey, one of the Australian Living Treasures
- Manning Clark
- Charles Coppel, former barrister and historian
- Keith Hancock
- Stuart Macintyre
- Michael Roe, historian and academic
- Ben Schrader, urban historian
- A. G. L. Shaw

==== Journalism ====
- Tiffiny Hall, journalist, author and television personality
- Joe Hildebrand, journalist, social commentator and news columnist
- Christine Kenneally, New York City-based journalist
- Matt Tinney, newsreader
- Bill Tipping, former journalist, social commentator and activist

==== Literature, writing and poetry ====
- Randa Abdel-Fattah, Australian Muslim author and lawyer
- Russell Blackford, writer, philosopher and critic
- Caroline Brothers, novelist and foreign correspondent
- Vincent Buckley
- Anna Ciddor, author and illustrator
- Helen Garner, author
- Kerry Greenwood, crime writer
- Germaine Greer, feminist writer and academic
- Jack Hibberd
- Fulvio Melia
- Gerald Murnane, novelist and short story writer
- Chris Wallace-Crabbe, Visiting Professor of Australian Studies at Harvard University
- Lynne Kelly, writer, researcher and science educator

==== Music ====
- Harry James Angus, trumpeter and vocalist (The Cat Empire)
- Wouter De Backer, musician known as 'Gotye'
- Cheryl Barker, opera singer
- Michael Barker, drummer (John Butler Trio, Split Enz)
- Don Banks, composer
- Nicole Car, opera singer
- Arthur Chanter 1866–1950, composer
- Diana Doherty, oboe soloist (New York Philharmonic)
- Leonard Dommett, violinist and conductor
- Julian Gavin, opera singer
- Antoinette Halloran, opera singer
- Phil Harvey, manager and creative director (Coldplay)
- Missy Higgins, singer-songwriter
- Rex Hobcroft, pianist and administrator
- Tania de Jong, soprano and social entrepreneur
- Liza Lim, composer
- John McAll, pianist and musical director
- Mona McBurney 1867–1932 composer
- Ryan Monro, bassist (The Cat Empire)
- Ian Munro, pianist and composer
- Patrick Savage, film composer and former principal first violin (Royal Philharmonic Orchestra)
- Peter Sculthorpe, composer
- Dudley Simpson, conductor and television composer
- Jan Skubiszewski, multi-award-winning record producer film composer
- Red Symons, musician, television and radio personality
- Penelope Thwaites, musicologist and pianist
- Yelian He, cellist
- Charles Zwar, songwriter, composer, lyricist, pianist and music director
- David Burd, US rapper, known as Lil Dicky

==== Philosophy ====
- Samuel Alexander
- Leslie Cannold
- Raimond Gaita
- Charles Leonard Hamblin
- Frank Cameron Jackson
- Graham Oppy
- Toby Ord
- Brian O'Shaughnessy
- Graham Priest
- Ian Robinson
- Peter Singer
- John Tasioulas, moral and legal philosopher
- Nick Trakakis
- John Weckert
- Damon Young

=== Law ===
Chief Justices of Australia

- Sir Owen Dixon, OM, GCMG, KC
- Sir Frank Gavan Duffy, KCMG, PC, KC
- Sir Isaac Isaacs, GCB, GCMG, KC
- Sir John Latham, GCMG, KC

Justices of the High Court of Australia

- Sir Keith Aickin, KBE, QC, former justice
- Susan Crennan
- Sir Daryl Dawson, AC, KBE, CB, QC, former justice
- Sir Wilfred Fullagar, KBE, KC, former justice
- Kenneth Hayne
- H. B. Higgins, former justice
- Sir Douglas Menzies, former justice
- Geoffrey Nettle
- Sir Ninian Stephen, KG, AK, GCMG, GCVO, KBE, QC, also a previous Governor-General of Australia

Chief Justice of the Federal Court of Australia

- Michael Black, AC, QC, former Chief Justice

Justices of the Federal Court of Australia

- Geoffrey Giudice
- Sir Edward Woodward, AC, OBE, QC, also served as a Royal Commissioner and Director-General of Security

Chief Justice of the Family Court of Australia

- Diana Bryant, AO, QC, Chief Justice since 2004
- Alastair Nicholson, AO, RFD, QC, former Chief Justice

Justices of the Family Court of Australia

- Linda Dessau, AM, former justice

Chief Justices of Victoria

- Lieutenant General Sir Edmund Herring, KCMG KBE DSO MC KStJ ED QC, also a former Lieutenant Governor of Victoria
- Sir William Irvine, GCMG, also a former Premier of Victoria
- Sir John Madden, GCMG, also a former Vice-Chancellor and Chancellor of the University
- Sir Frederick Mann, KCMG, also a former Lieutenant Governor of Victoria
- John Harber Phillips, AC QC, also a former Victorian Director of Public Prosecutions and Director of the National Crime Authority
- Sir Henry Winneke, AC KCMG KCVO OBE KStJ QC, also a former Governor of Victoria
- Sir John Young, AC KCMG

Justices of the Supreme Court of Victoria

- Sir Kevin Anderson, QC
- Sir Arthur Dean, KC
- Sir James Gobbo, AC, CVO, QC, also a former Governor of Victoria
- Sir George Pape
- Joseph Santamaria QC

Presidents of the Victorian Court of Appeal

- Chris Maxwell
- John Winneke, AC, RFD, QC, RANR

==== Other legal professionals ====
- Philip Alston, international law scholar; former United Nations Special Rapporteur
- John Bennett, civil libertarian
- Matthew Collins, barrister and Senior Fellow at the Melbourne Law School
- Mario Condello, lawyer; murdered during Melbourne gangland killings
- Frank Costigan, QC, lawyer, Royal Commissioner and social justice activist
- Rowan Downing, QC, barrister and international jurist
- Frank Galbally, CBE, criminal defence lawyer
- Flos Greig, first woman to be admitted to practise as a barrister and solicitor in Australia
- Philip Griffiths, KC, jurist
- Francis Gurry, international intellectual property lawyer and bureaucrat
- Colin Lovitt, QC, criminal barrister
- Julian McMahon, A.C., barrister, humanitarian, campaigner against death penalty
- Rob Stary, criminal defence lawyer
- Tengku Amalin A'ishah Putri, Princess of Kelantan Royal Family
- Lord Uthwatt, Judge, Chancery Division, High Court of Justice of England and Wales, Lord of Appeal in Ordinary, House of Lords

=== Military ===
- Group Captain John Balmer, OBE, DFC, World War II RAAF bomber pilot
- Major General Sir Julius Bruche, KCB, CMG, Second Boer War and World War I army officer
- Sir Samuel Burston, army doctor and World War II general
- Rupert Downes, army doctor and World War II general
- Sir Edward 'Weary' Dunlop, army doctor and humanitarian
- Major General Harold "Pompey" Elliott, CB, CMG, DSO, DCM, VD, politician and World War I army general
- Sir Neil Hamilton Fairley, army doctor
- Brigadier General William Grant, CMG, World War I general
- Sir James Whiteside McCay, politician and World War I general
- Sir John Monash, World War I general
- Sir Kingsley Norris, army doctor and major general
- Lieutenant Colonel Philip Rhoden, OBE, ED, lawyer and World War II army officer
- Ian Upjohn, CSC, SC, Army Reserve officer and barrister

=== Religious leaders ===
- Rabbi Raymond Apple

=== Sciences ===
==== Agriculture ====
- Yvonne Aitken, botanist, first woman to earn a PhD in Agriculture form the University of Melbourne in 1970

==== Biology ====
- Elizabeth Blackburn, awarded the Nobel Prize in Medicine in 2009
- Margaret Blackwood, botanist and geneticist
- Kirsten Parris, urban ecologist
- Grant Sutherland, human geneticist
- Torsten Seemann, bioinformatician

==== Computing ====
- Andrew Freeman, FACS – Fellow of the Australian Computer Society (elected in 1997), and an Honorary Life Member (HLM) of the ACS (elected in 2018)

==== Geology ====
- Norman Greenwood

==== Chemistry ====
- Cyril Callister, creator of Vegemite
- Beryl Splatt
- Shu Jie Lam

==== Engineering ====
- Sir Walter Bassett
- William Charles Kernot
- Diane Lemaire, first woman to graduate from the University of Melbourne with a degree in engineering
- Anthony Michell
- John Monash
- Elizabeth Jens
- Ian A. Young, senior fellow of Intel; co-inventor of BiCMOS logic family and clocks for Pentium series microprocessors
- Frank Caruso

==== Mathematics ====
- Robert Bartnik
- Keith Briggs
- Danny Calegari
- Robert William Chapman
- Thomas MacFarland Cherry
- Ian G. Enting
- Greg Hjorth
- Mark S. Joshi
- Kenneth McIntyre
- Brendan McKay
- Samuel McLaren
- John Henry Michell
- Edward J. Nanson
- Jonathan Pila
- E. J. G. Pitman
- J. Hyam Rubinstein
- Hans Schwerdtfeger
- Ian Sloan
- Geoffrey Watson
- William Parkinson Wilson

==== Medicine ====
- Lilian Helen Alexander, one of the first women to study medicine at the university
- Ellen Balaam, first woman surgeon in Melbourne
- Marjorie Bick, biochemist
- Vera Scantlebury Brown
- Sir Frank Macfarlane Burnet, awarded the Nobel Prize in Medicine in 1960 "for the discovery that the immune system of the fetus learns how to distinguish between self and non-self"
- Amy de Castilla, Physician and co-founder of the Queen Victoria Hospital, Melbourne and the Victorian Medical Women's Society.
- Clara Stone, Physician and co-founder of the Queen Victoria Hospital, Melbourne and the Victorian Medical Women's Society. One of the first seven women to be allowed to study medicine at Melbourne University.
- Sir John Carew Eccles, awarded the Nobel Prize in Medicine in 1963 "for describing the electric transmission of impulses along nerves"
- Constance Ellis, first woman to receive a Doctor of Medicine from the university
- Mavis Freeman, bacteriologist and biochemist
- Jane Stocks Greig, public health specialist
- Janet Greig, Victoria's first female anaesthetist
- David Handelsman, Australia's first professor in reproductive endocrinology and andrology
- Girlie Hodges (1904–1999), Australian surgeon and field hockey player who represented Australia
- James Lawson, public health doctor and scientist
- Annie O'Hara, doctor and one of the first seven women to be allowed to study medicine at Melbourne University.
- Elizabeth O'Hara, one of the first seven women to be allowed to study medicine at Melbourne University.
- Lorna Verdun Sisely, Surgeon and founder of the Queen Victoria Medical Centre Breast Clinic.
- Elizabeth Scarr, associate professor at the Department of Psychiatry, project leader of Cooperative Research Centre for Mental Health, and leader of the Psychiatric Neuropathology laboratory at the university
- Helen Sexton, surgeon, one of the first women to study medicine at the university
- Emily Mary Page Stone, Physician and co-founder of the Queen Victoria Hospital, Melbourne and the Victorian Medical Women's Society.
- Jaishankar Raman, cardiothoracic surgeon and academic.
- Rajaratnam Sundarason, surgeon, one of the founders of International House
- Elizabeth Kathleen Turner, medical superintendent of the (Royal) Children's Hospital Melbourne from 1943 until 1946. She was first doctor in Australia to administer penicillin.
- Grace Vale, Physician and co-founder of the Victorian Medical Women's Society. One of the first seven women to be allowed to study medicine at Melbourne University.
- Sydney James Van Pelt, pioneer of modern hypnotherapy
- Margaret Whyte, Physician, and one of the first seven women to be allowed to study medicine at Melbourne University.

==== Physics ====
- Nicole Bell
- Walter Boas
- Samuel L. Braunstein
- John M. Cowley
- Rod Crewther
- Richard Dalitz, inventor of the Dalitz plot
- Terence James Elkins
- Colin J. Gillespie
- Kerr Grant
- Peter Hannaford
- Alan Head
- T. H. Laby
- Rodney Marks
- Leslie H. Martin
- Sir Harrie Massey
- Fulvio Melia
- Keith Nugent
- Helen Quinn, former president of the American Physical Society; recipient of the Dirac Medal in 2000 and the Sakurai Prize in 2013
- William Sutherland

==== Psychology ====
- Vicki Anderson, pediatric neuropsychologist
- Kathleen Funder, researcher, Australian Institute of Family Studies
- Peter O'Connor, psychologist

==== Veterinary Science ====
- Cyril Seelenmeyer, VFL footballer, veterinary surgeon, winner of Military Cross
- Harold Addison Woodruff, Professor of veterinary pathology and director of the veterinary institute

=== Sport ===
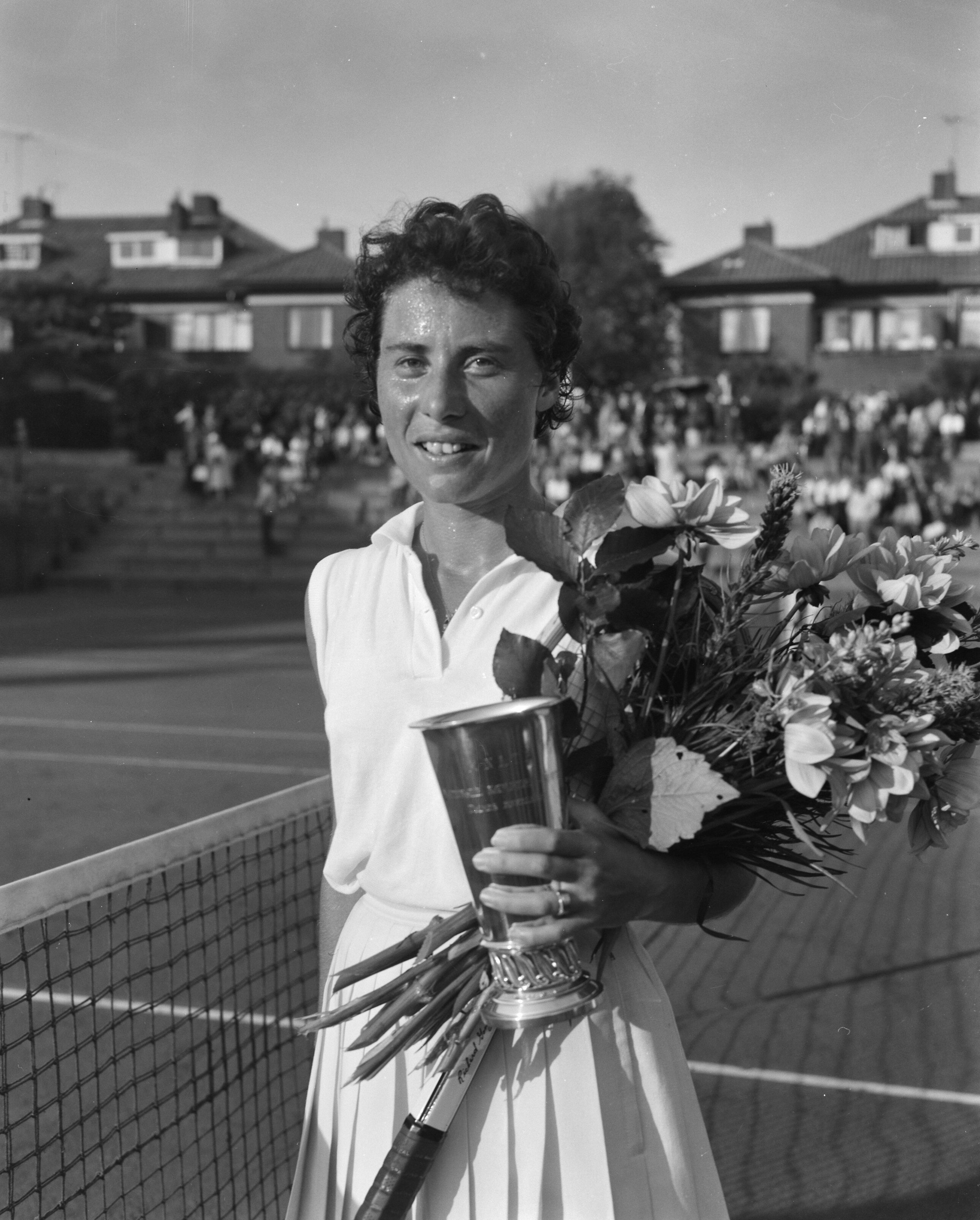
Eva Duldig

- Russell Basser (born 1960), Olympic water polo player
- Kim Crow, London Olympics silver and bronze medallist for doubles and singles sculling respectively
- Eva Duldig (born 1938), Austrian-born Australian and Dutch tennis player, author
- Bev Francis, IFBB professional Australian female bodybuilder, powerlifter, and national shot put champion
- Geoff Grover, VFL and VFA footballer; VFA interstate representative (1966 Hobart Carnival)
- Jemima Montag (born 1998), Olympic 2x bronze medal winning racewalker
- John Robinson, VFL footballer; recipient of the Distinguished Conduct Medal (1917)

== Faculty ==
- Joshua Thomas Noble Anderson
- Peter Baines, geophysicist
- Lisa Cameron
- Henri Daniel Rathgeber
- Jocelyn Hyslop, inaugural Director of Social Studies
- Josephine Forbes, Principal Research Fellow, Department of Medicine
- Katja Hölttä-Otto

== Administration ==
=== Chancellors ===
Ordinal	Name	Term begin	Term end	Time in office	Notes
1	Sir Redmond Barry KCMG	17 May 1853	23 November 1880	27 years, 190 days	
2	Sir William Stawell KCMG	2 May 1881	8 May 1882	1 year, 6 days	
3	James Moorhouse	1883	1886		
4	William HearnAM QC	1886			
5	Sir Anthony Brownless CMG	1887	1897		
6	Sir John Madden GCMG	1897	1918		
7	Sir John MacFarland	1918	1935		
8	Sir James Barrett KBE CB CMG	1935	1939		
9	Sir John Latham PC GCMG KC	1939	1941		
10	Sir Charles John Lowe KCMG	1941	1954		
11	Sir Arthur Dean QC	1954	1966		
12	Sir William Upjohn OBE	1966	1967		
13	Sir Robert Menzies AK CH QC	1967	1972		
14	Leonard Weickhardt CBE	1972	1978		
15	Sir Oliver Gillard	1978	1980		
16	Sir Roy Wright AK	1980	1989		
17	Sir Edward Woodward AC OBE QC	1990	2001		
18	Fay Marles AM	2001	2004		
19	Ian Renard AM	2005	2009		
20	Alex Chernov AC QC	2009	2011		
21	Elizabeth Alexander AO	8 April 2011	31 December 2016	5 years, 267 days	
22	Allan Myers AC KC	1 January 2017	31 December 2022	5 years, 364 days	
23	Jane Hansen AO	1 January 2023	incumbent	3 years, 321 days	

=== Vice-Chancellors ===
Order	Vice-Chancellor	Years	Notes
1	Hugh Childers	1853–1857	
2	Anthony Brownless	1858–1887	
3	Martin Irving	1887–1889	
4	Sir John Madden	1889–1897	
5	Sir Henry Wrixon	1897–1910	
6	Sir John MacFarland	1910–1918	
7	Sir John Grice	1918–1923	
8	General Sir John Monash	1923–1931	
9	James Barrett	1931–1934	
10	Sir Raymond Priestley	1935–1938	
11	Sir John Medley	1938–1951	
12	Sir George Whitecross Paton	1951–1968	
13	Sir David Plumley Derham	1968–1982	
14	Professor David Caro	1982–1987	
15	David Penington	1988–1995	
16	Alan Gilbert	1996–2004	
17	Glyn Davis	2005–2018	
18	Duncan Maskell	2018–present	

=== Provost ===
Nicola Phillips was appointed provost of the university in April 2021, remaining in the position until being appointed inaugural vice-chancellor of the newly-formed Adelaide University from January 2026.
