= Siegling =

Siegling is a surname. Notable people with the surname include:

- Alfred Siegling (1918–1984), German soldier awarded the Knight's Cross of the Iron Cross
- Karl Siegling, Australian businessman
- Marie Siegling (1824–1920), American composer
- Rudolph Septimus Siegling (1839–1894), American legislator and lawyer
- Wilhelm Siegling (1880-1940), German linguist
