= Peter Connor =

Peter Connor may refer to:

- Peter S. Connor (1932–1966), United States Marine Corps staff sergeant posthumously awarded the Medal of Honor
- Peter Connor (canoeist) (born 1963), Irish sprint canoer
- Peter Connor (footballer), English former footballer

== See also ==
- Peter O'Connor (disambiguation)
