= Bradd =

Bradd is a name. Notable people with this name include:

- Bradd Wong (born 1960), American actor
- Bradd Dalziell (born 1987), Australian football player
- Bradd Shore (born 1945), American anthropologist
- Bradd Westmoreland (born 1975), Australian painter
- Les Bradd (born 1947), English football player
