= 2/14th Battalion (Australia) =

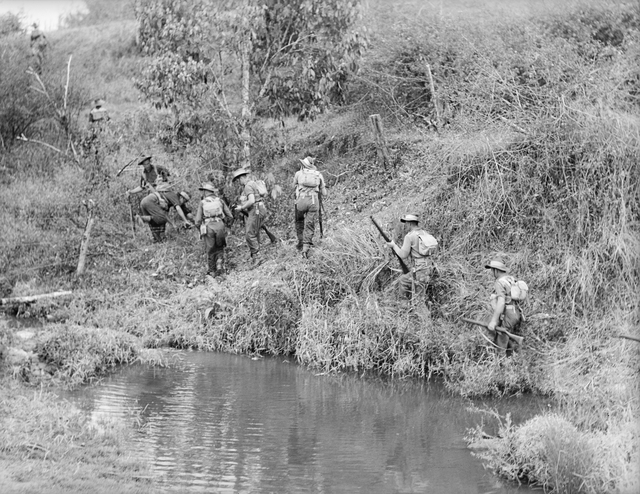
- 2/14th Battalion personnel training on the Atherton Tablelands, September 1944
- Active: 1940–1946
- Country: Australia
- Branch: Australian Army
- Type: Infantry
- Size: ~800–900 personnel (Note: By the start of World War II, the authorised strength of an Australian infantry battalion was 910 men all ranks; however, later in the war it fell to 803.)
- Part of: 21st Brigade, 7th Division
- Engagements: World War II: Syria–Lebanon campaign; New Guinea campaign; Finisterre Range campaign; Battle of Balikpapan (1945)

Commanders
- Notable commanders: Ralph Honner

Insignia
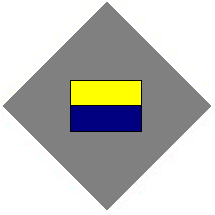
- Unit colour patch

The 2/14th Battalion was an infantry battalion of the Australian Army that served during World War II. Part of the 21st Brigade, 7th Division, the battalion was raised from Second Australian Imperial Force volunteers drawn mainly from the state of Victoria. After completing training in Australia in 1940, the battalion deployed to the Middle East where it was stationed in Egypt and Palestine before it saw action against the Vichy French in Syria in June and July 1941, in a short lived campaign. Garrison duties in Lebanon followed before the battalion was withdrawn to Australia in early 1942 as Australian forces were concentrated in the Pacific to respond to the threat posed by Japan's entry into the war.

After a short period of re-training in Australia to prepare for jungle warfare, the battalion was deployed to New Guinea in August 1942 as the Australians sent reinforcements to the Kokoda Track to fight against Japanese forces that had been advancing towards Port Moresby. After the Japanese were forced to exhaust their supplies they began to fall back towards their beachheads on the north coast. The 2/14th was part of the Australian advance that then saw further action around Gona. In September 1943, after a period of re-organisation in Australia, the battalion took part in the advance on Lae as the Allies went on the offensive in New Guinea, before taking part in the fighting in the Markham and Ramu Valleys of the Finisterre Range campaign. The battalion's final involvement in the war came in the landing on Balikpapan in 1945. The 2/14th was disbanded after the war, in early 1946.

== History ==
=== Formation ===
The 2/14th Battalion (Note: The numerical designation of 2nd AIF units was prefixed by "2/", which was used to set them apart from Militia units with corresponding numerical designations.) was raised on 26 April 1940 at Puckapunyal, Victoria, shortly after the start of World War II as part of the all-volunteer Second Australian Imperial Force (2nd AIF), which was established at the time from personnel that had volunteered to serve in combat overseas. The battalion was assigned to the 21st Brigade, 7th Division, and would remain part of this formation throughout its existence. It had an authorised strength of around 900 personnel, and most of those were drawn from the state of Victoria, although some were allocated from other states later as reinforcements. Many of the battalion's initial recruits had previous military experience, having served in the Militia prior to volunteering for the 2nd AIF, with the majority having to relinquish rank to transfer. Officially the battalion's average age on formation was 29, although the battalion historian, William Russell, asserts that this is not necessarily accurate as men were found to have altered their ages both up (from as young as 15) and down (from as old as 55) upon recruitment. In keeping with 2nd AIF recruitment practices, there were many pairs of brothers who were early recruits; there was even one case of a father and son who served in the same platoon.

Soon after battalion headquarters was established, the battalion's first commanding officer, Lieutenant Colonel William Cannon, began choosing his officers, who then set about the task of forming their own companies and platoons, as the unit structure was built up around four rifle companies – designated 'A' through to 'D' – with a battalion headquarters and a headquarters company consisting of several specialist platoons including signals, pioneer, anti-aircraft, transport, administration and mortars. The battalion's companies were formed largely along territorial lines, with 'A' Company being drawn mainly from the Mildura and north-eastern regions of Victoria, while 'B' Company was drawn from Geelong, the Western District, Prahran, Brighton and the Mornington Peninsula. 'C' Company consisted largely of men from Ballarat and Melbourne's inner suburbs, and men of Scottish ancestry, while those of Irish ancestry formed 'D' Company. Once the battalion's complement of men had arrived at Puckapunyal and formation was complete, basic training began in May 1940. On 18 August, the battalion was presented its regimental colours in a ceremony by members of the 14th Battalion, who had served during World War I. This was done to establish links with the units of the First Australian Imperial Force, and later, in early October, the 2/14th Battalion changed its unit colour patch from a black over blue diamond to the yellow and blue rectangle of its earlier counterpart. Shortly after this, although still only partially trained, the battalion received orders to deploy overseas, and on 18 October the men embarked upon the Aquitania in Sydney, bound for the Middle East.

=== Middle East ===
Travelling via India, where they camped at Deolali, near Bombay, the battalion arrived at Kantara, in Egypt on 25 November 1940 and were transported to Julius Camp in Palestine, where the soldiers undertook further training. Later, they were moved to Dimra in March 1941, before being sent in April to Mersa Matruh, in Egypt, to defend against a possible German attack there during the siege of Tobruk. Although no German attack came there, during their time at Maaten Bagush the battalion was subjected to aerial attack. It remained there until the end of May when the battalion was relieved by a South African battalion. The 21st Brigade then returned to Palestine to begin preparations for operations in Syria and Lebanon against the Vichy French to prevent the area from falling into the hands of the Germans who could then have launched an attack on the Suez Canal from there, or captured the oilfields in Persia (present-day Iran).

The 2/14th Battalion's involvement in the Syria–Lebanon campaign began on the night of 7/8 June when the unit advanced across the Palestine border from Hanita and attacked Vichy outposts around the village of Alma Chaab. Following this, the battalion advanced along the coast towards Tyre, from where it evicted the French defenders before forcing a crossing over the Litani River. On 11 June, the 21st Brigade's advance towards Sidon came up against determined resistance around the Zahrani River, at Merdjayoun. The 2/14th Battalion found themselves up against troops from the French Foreign Legion's 6th Foreign Infantry Regiment. For the next few days the battalion came under attack from Vichy French aircraft and artillery before being committed to a flanking action on 15 June. Conducting a 30-kilometre (19 mi) march during the heat of the day, the Australians approached Sidon through the mountains but arrived just after the town fell to the 2/27th Battalion.

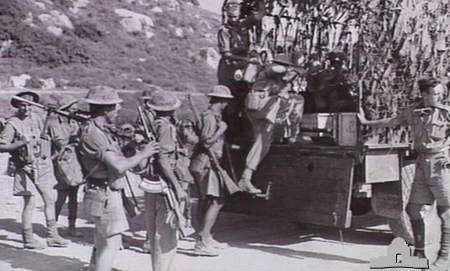
2/14th Battalion reinforcements in Syria, 13 June 1941

Following this, on 17 June, the battalion was moved to the central sector of the Allied advance to reinforce the 2/31st Battalion, attached to the 25th Brigade, which was holding off a Vichy French counter-attack at Jezzine. After Damascus was captured on 22 June, the 2/14th Battalion was committed to the fighting to secure a number of features on Mount Kharatt, high ground north-east of the town which dominated the surrounding area. These attacks proved unsuccessful, and quite costly for the 2/14th, with 12 killed and 47 wounded on 24 June. The fighting around Jezzine continued until 29 June when the French began to withdraw. After this, the Australians regained the initiative and on 2 July the 2/14th Battalion left Jezzine to begin preparations for the Battle of Damour, to which it was committed on 5 July 1941. Between then and 9 July, the 2/14th were involved in a number of attacks, capturing French positions on Hills 243 and 567.

On 12 July, an armistice came into effect, ending the fighting. Following this, the 2/14th Battalion was initially used to conduct battlefield clearance tasks before moving to Beirut where the men were used as garrison troops overseeing the repatriation of captured Vichy soldiers to France. Later, in September, the battalion was transferred to the north to construct defensive positions near Tripoli in Lebanon. In December 1941, following the Japanese attacks on Pearl Harbor and in Malaya, the decision was made to bring the 6th and 7th Divisions back to Australia. In early January 1942, the 7th Division left Syria, where it had been undertaking garrison duties, and returned to Palestine. The 2/14th were moved to a camp near Jerusalem, and during this time command of the battalion passed to Lieutenant Colonel Arthur Key, who had previously commanded the 2/8th Battalion. On 30 January 1942 the 2/14th Battalion embarked on the transport Ile de France from Port Tewfik in Egypt, bound for Australia. The 2/14th's casualties during its deployment to the Middle East were 21 killed, 94 wounded and 11 captured.

=== Kokoda Track ===
The battalion returned to Australia via Bombay, where the infantrymen were transferred to the troopship City of Paris in early February. They arrived in Adelaide, South Australia, on 24 March 1942. After this a period of leave followed, and then the battalion undertook defensive duties and training around Yandina, Queensland, before being dispatched along with the rest of the 7th Division to New Guinea where the situation on the Kokoda Track was becoming critical for the Australians as the Japanese advanced towards Port Moresby.

On 13 August 1942, the 21st Brigade, including the 2/14th Battalion, disembarked in Port Moresby. Three days later, 16 August, the battalion was transported on trucks to Ilolo before marching to Uberi, reaching Myola on 21 August. On 25 August, the battalion received orders to relieve the severely depleted 39th Battalion, which was holding the Japanese at Isurava. Due to a shortage of supplies it was only possible for one company to move at a time, and as a result 'C' Company was dispatched to Isurava first, while 'B' and 'D' Companies were dispatched to Alola and 'A' Company moved to Templeton's Crossing. 'C' Company subsequently reached the 39th's position late in the evening of 26 August. The following day, the Japanese launched a fresh offensive with three battalions from the 144th Infantry Regiment, and throughout the day a number of minor engagements took place. On 27 August, the Japanese offensive began in earnest as the 39th Battalion's positions around Isurava were subjected to heavy mortar and artillery fire. Japanese infantry broke into the position through the gaps between one of company's depleted platoons, but the situation was restored by two Australian counter-attacks.

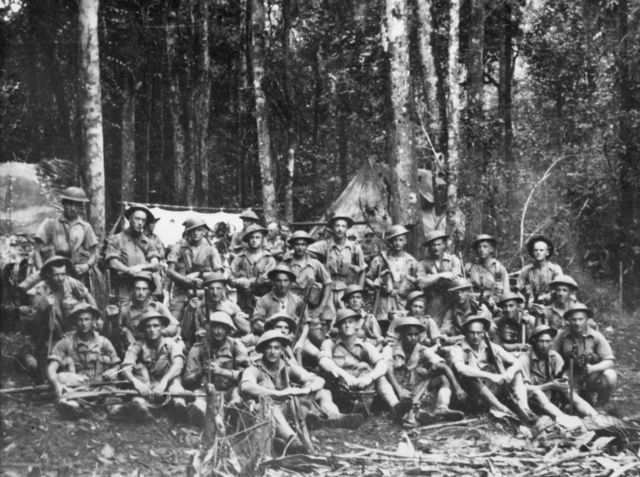
Men from 9 Platoon, 'A' Company, 2/14th Battalion at Kokoda on 16 August 1942

The rest of the 2/14th Battalion arrived on 28 August amidst continuing fighting, bringing with them a 3-inch (76 mm) mortar for indirect fire support. The 39th Battalion then moved to the rear, but remained in support of the 2/14th to help repel the next wave of the Japanese attack. By 29 August, the Japanese had about six battalions around Isurava, and in the morning fresh attacks succeeded in breaking into the 2/14th's position with 'C' Company, on the battalion's right, being forced to give ground. With the situation critical, the Australians launched a counter-attack. As a part of this attack, Private Bruce Kingsbury charged the Japanese, firing his Bren light machine gun from the hip, killing at least 30 of them and forcing others to withdraw. Although Kingsbury was subsequently killed by a sniper, his actions allowed the Australians to briefly regain their positions and later he was posthumously awarded the Victoria Cross, Australia's highest military decoration. Further attacks during the day, however, forced the battalion to fall back 1 kilometre (0.62 mi) down the track.

On 30 August, the Japanese began threatening the 2/14th's left flank from the high ground situated there, and as another attack put the battalion's rear in jeopardy, the battalion was forced to give more ground. At this point, the brigade commander, Brigadier Arnold Potts, authorised a withdrawal to Alola. With the Japanese pressing against their rear guard, over the course of the following fortnight, the battalion fought a series of delaying actions and fighting withdrawals towards Ioribaiwa and Imita Ridge. By the time it reached Imita Ridge, the 2/14th was so depleted that it was amalgamated with the 2/16th Battalion to form a composite battalion of just over 300 men, and as the 21st Brigade prepared to make a final stand, the battalions of the 25th Brigade arrived to relieve them. Following this, the composite battalion was withdrawn from the line on 16 September. The 2/14th Battalion had begun the Kokoda campaign with 546 men, but upon arriving at Uberi, where they had been placed in reserve, there were only 88 men available, of whom only three were officers. Casualties were high, with 110 men being killed in action, with two more dying of their wounds and another four being killed in accidents. A further 132 were also wounded.

=== Gona ===
Following the 21st Brigade's relief, the fighting in New Guinea began to turn in favour of the Allies, as the Japanese, having exhausted their supplies, began to fall back towards their beachheads on the north coast. By November 1942, although the 2/14th had been reformed at Koitaki, near Port Moresby, it was still not up to full strength, with a total of only 341 men of all ranks. Nevertheless, the situation in New Guinea meant that the 21st Brigade was needed to help capture the Japanese beachhead around Gona on the north-eastern coast. The 2/14th Battalion, under the command of Lieutenant Colonel Hugh Challen who had replaced Key in late September, after the latter had been captured and executed by the Japanese following the fighting around Isurava, was placed in the vanguard of the brigade's move, being air transported to Popondetta on 25 November.

Organised into three half-strength companies, the following day the battalion began the 32-kilometre (20 mi) march towards Gona. On 29 November, the 2/14th attacked along the coast to the east of Gona. The Japanese positions were well-concealed and amidst strong resistance the 2/14th suffered heavy casualties, losing 13 killed and 23 wounded. Early in the morning on 30 November the battalion lost another three killed before it launched a well-planned deliberate attack on the remaining Japanese fortified position. For only two minor casualties, the 2/14th forced the Japanese defenders to abandon their positions and managed to break through to the beach, securing about 1.5 kilometres (0.93 mi) along the coast.

On 8 December, a reinforced platoon from the 2/14th was ordered to conduct a reconnaissance around Haddy's Village, 2 kilometres (1.2 mi) west of Gona, where the Japanese had landed reinforcements on 6 December. Under the command of Lieutenant Bob Dougherty, the platoon launched a surprise attack against the numerically superior force. In the hand-to-hand fighting that followed over 90 Japanese were killed or wounded, while six men from the 2/14th were wounded. The attack proved a success and enabled the Australians around Gona to attack without concern about being engaged by the Japanese reinforcements. Gona was subsequently taken on 9 December. Dougherty was killed leading a patrol around the village on 11 December. The battalion remained in the area until 8 January 1943, by which time there were only 21 fit personnel left. They were subsequently returned to Australia. Casualties during the fighting around Buna, Gona and Sanananda amounted to 50 killed in action or died of wounds or accidentally, as well as 88 wounded.

=== Lae and the Finisterres ===
By the time that the 21st Brigade arrived back in Australia, it was heavily depleted, with only 44 per cent of its authorised strength. The 2/14th subsequently underwent a period of rebuilding around Ravenshoe, in Queensland, in preparation for further operations. During this time the units of the 7th Division were converted to the "jungle" divisional establishment, which saw a reduction in the 2/14th Battalion's authorised strength to just over 800 men. As the battalion was brought back up to strength, in July there was a change of command. On 5 July, Lieutenant Colonel Ralph Honner, who had previously commanded the 39th Battalion during the fighting on the Kokoda Track, replaced Challen as commanding officer. In August, along with the rest of the 21st Brigade the battalion moved to Port Moresby where it undertook training for the next month in preparation for the Salamaua–Lae campaign. However, the battalion was destined to only take a limited role in the campaign, and on 15 September it was dispatched to the airfields at Nadzab to relieve the US Army's 503rd Parachute Infantry Regiment and defend the vital airfields from possible Japanese attack.

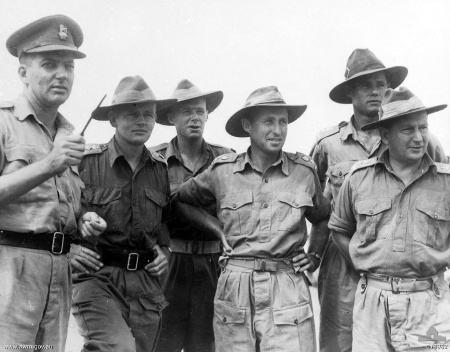
Brigadier Ivan Dougherty (left), 21st Brigade commander, with his battalion commanders. Lieutenant Colonel Philip Rhoden of the 2/14th is fourth from the left.

After this, the 2/14th was committed to the advance into the Markham Valley and Finisterre Range, in the vanguard of the 21st Brigade's advance from Kaiapit to Dumpu in late September and early October. Moving through the 2/16th Battalion's position and advancing on to Marawasa, the 2/14th left the Markham Valley and proceeded into the Ramu Valley. The 2/14th then moved on the 2/16th's right flank, protecting it from any Japanese attacks that might have eventuated from the north. On 4 October 1943, the battalion reached Wampun village. It was there that the battalion's commanding officer, Honner, was seriously wounded when he moved beyond the main defensive position to personally carry out a reconnaissance of the surrounding area. A platoon was sent in to extricate Honner as the Japanese began advancing on his position, and after directing a company-level attack against the Japanese, Honner handed over command to Captain Ian Hamilton, commander of 'C' Company, who served as acting commander briefly until Major Mert Lee arrived from brigade headquarters. Lee remained in acting command until the battalion second-in-command, Major Philip Rhoden, returned from a staff course to officially take over command of the battalion as a lieutenant colonel in December.

Throughout early 1944, the battalion was mainly involved in patrol operations in support of the 21st Brigade's advance up the Faria River to capture the Japanese positions on the Kankiryo Saddle during the Battle of Shaggy Ridge. As a part of this effort, the battalion's most significant engagement came on 11 October 1943 when 9 Platoon, under Lieutenant Noel Pallier, destroyed a Japanese company in capturing a ridge that overlooked the valley. The Japanese company had been threatening to cut off the supply line of the 2/27th Battalion, which was leading the 21st Brigade's advance and the following day, heavy fighting took place around John's Knoll and Trevor's Ridge. After this, the battalion undertook mainly patrol actions in the following weeks, these actions varied in size from small groups to company-sized forces, and varied in length from one day to up to a week. In late November, the battalion relieve the 2/25th Battalion around John's Knoll, marching 17 miles (27 km). From there, they occupied an outpost position opposite a strong Japanese position, against which they clashed several times throughout December until being withdrawn to the rear around the Lakes area in late December, and then Port Moresby in early January 1944. Although there were only limited engagements with the Japanese during the four months that the 2/14th were involved in the campaign, the battalion still suffered heavily with 958 men being evacuated due to illness or accidental injury during this time. Of these, four died and a further 546 were permanently removed from the theatre. In contrast, battle casualties during this time amounted to seven killed in action, three died of wounds and 25 wounded.

=== Borneo ===
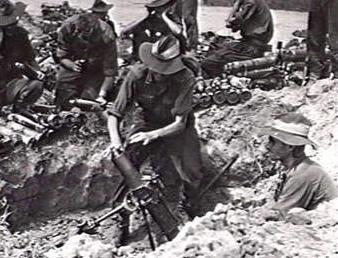
A 3-inch mortar crew in action around Manggar airstrip, 5 July 1945

After being withdrawn back to Australia in March 1944, the units of the 7th Division received six weeks' leave before reforming on the Atherton Tablelands in Queensland. Following this the 2/14th Battalion undertook a period of training before finally being committed to their last campaign of the war in mid-1945. This campaign saw them take part in the amphibious landings at Balikpapan on 1 July 1945. During the initial landings early on 1 July, the 2/14th came ashore at the wrong place, landing at Yellow Beach when it had been scheduled to land at Green Beach. Nevertheless, the landing was largely unopposed and after 45 minutes of reorganisation the Australians were able to establish themselves at their correct form up point and begin the advance to their first objective: the bridge over the Klandasan Besar. Advancing unopposed they crossed the bridge and at nightfall dug-in in front of the Stalkudo ridge, along the Vasey Highway. The following day, the battalion captured the Sepinggang airstrip as the 21st Brigade began the advance to the east. The 2/27th Battalion subsequently relieved the 2/14th at Sepinggang and on 3 July, the battalion began to move towards the Manggar Airfield. The 21st Brigade then came up against stronger opposition near the Batakan Ketjil River, which held them up until the evening.

The following day the 2/14th resumed its advance towards Manggar and after crossing the river and beginning to move across the strip the battalion's lead company began to receive artillery fire from Japanese coastal defence guns. Naval gunfire support was called in to provide counter-battery fire, but this was only partially effective and the following day air support and tanks were brought it. For the next three days minor infantry actions were undertaken around the periphery of the position while direct and indirect fire support was used to reduce the position, with a view to limiting casualties among the infantry. Finally, on 9 July, the battalion attacked the two remaining Japanese positions, which had been named "Frost" and "Brown" by the Australians. Supported by a naval bombardment and Liberator heavy bombers which dropped napalm, two companies from the 2/14th Battalion captured the position where it found over 100 Japanese dead along with a number of artillery pieces including two 120 mm naval guns and four 75 mm high-angle guns, as well as numerous heavy mortars and machine-guns. This represented the last of the 2/14th Battalion's major combat actions of the war. The 21st Brigade subsequently captured Sambodja and then as the tempo of operations wound down in anticipation of the end of the war, the Australians began conducting patrol operations in the interior, stretching towards the 25th Brigade's area along the Milford Highway. The battalion's casualties in its final campaign of the war amounted to 21 killed and 41 wounded.

=== Disbandment ===
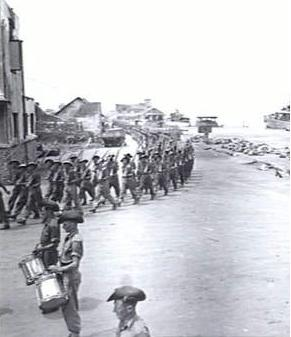
Troops from the 2/14th Battalion at Makassar, Celebes, October 1945

Following the cessation of hostilities in August 1945, the 2/14th Battalion remained on Borneo until October 1945 when it was moved to Makassar in the Celebes Islands (present-day Sulawesi, Indonesia). The battalion's personnel arrived there on 1 October 1945 but shortly thereafter the 2/14th was transported by sea to Pare-Pare, arriving there on 5 October. While there the battalion undertook garrison duties, guarding Japanese prisoners of war and maintaining administration and law and order until the Dutch were in a position to re-assert colonial rule. Despite the complex political situation, the 2/14th Battalion managed to achieve this without violence and on 5 January 1946 the 50th Battalion, Royal Netherlands East Indies Army, began to arrive to relieve them. This was completed by 17 January. On 22 January 1946 the battalion embarked on HMAS Kanimbla, bound for Australia. Upon arrival in Brisbane, Queensland, the demobilisation process began and the battalion's ranks were quickly reduced. Finally, on 22 February 1946, at Victoria Barracks the final paperwork was signed off and the battalion was disbanded.

During the course of the war, a total of 2,990 men served in the battalion; of these 222 were killed in action or died of wounds, or of illness or accident on active service. A further 378 men from the 2/14th were wounded in action, while 11 men became prisoners of war. (Note: There is some discrepancy in the various sources regarding the 2/14th's casualties. Russell provides the figures of 151 killed in action, 31 missing in action, 25 died of wounds, 19 died of illness and 378 wounded in action, while the Australian War Memorial provides totals of 245 dead and 379 wounded.) The vast majority of these casualties came during the fighting around Kokoda where the battalion suffered 248 battle casualties. For their service during the war, members of the 2/14th received the following gallantry and distinguished service decorations: one Victoria Cross, four Military Crosses, three Distinguished Conduct Medals, 19 Military Medals, one British Empire Medal and 44 Mentions in Despatches. In addition, one member was appointed as an Officer of the Order of the British Empire. One section from the battalion, 7 Section from 9 Platoon, 'A' Company, is believed to be, according to Dornan, "the most highly decorated section in Australian and British military history". Of the 11 men that were assigned to 7 Section when it was first formed in 1940, one of them received the Victoria Cross, one received a Distinguished Conduct Medal and four received the Military Medal.

== Commanders ==
The following officers served as commanding officer of the 2/14th Battalion:

- Lieutenant Colonel William Cannon (1940–1942);
- Lieutenant Colonel Arthur Key (1942);
- Lieutenant Colonel Hugh Challen (1942–1943);
- Lieutenant Colonel Ralph Honner (1943);
- Lieutenant Colonel Philip Rhoden (1943–1946).

== Battle honours ==
The 2/14th Battalion received the following battle honours for its service during the war:

- North Africa, Syria 1941, Syrian Frontier, Adlun, Jezzine, Damour, South-West Pacific 1942–1945, Kokoda Trail, Isurava, Eora Creek–Templeton's Crossing I, Efogi–Menari, Ioribaiwa, Buna–Gona, Gona, Amboga River, Lae–Nadzab, Liberation of Australian New Guinea, Ramu Valley, Shaggy Ridge, Borneo 1945, and Balikpapan.

== Notes ==
Footnotes

Citations
