= Peter O'Connor =

Peter O'Connor may refer to:

- Peter O'Connor (athlete) (1872–1957), Irish athlete
- Peter O'Connor (psychologist) (born 1942), Australian psychotherapist
- Peter O'Connor (Irish republican) (1912–1999), Irish republican and communist who fought in the Spanish civil war

== See also ==
- Peter Connor (disambiguation)
