= Berwick Grammar School =

Location
- Officer, Victoria; Australia; 38°3′10″S 145°24′48″E

Information
- Type: Independent, boys' school, middle, secondary, day
- Motto: Latin: Virtute et Labore (Virtue and Labour)
- Denomination: Non-denominational
- Established: 2009
- Principal: Steven Middleton
- Years offered: 7 to 12 (2017 school year)
- Gender: Boys
- Enrolment: ~180
- Colours: Navy, red, and gold
- Affiliation: Southern Independent Schools
- Website: Berwick Grammar School

Berwick Grammar School (BGS) is the senior boys campus of St Margaret's and Berwick Grammar School, located in Officer, Victoria, Australia. The St Margaret's senior girls campus and co-educational junior school are both located in Berwick. The head of campus is Steven Middleton, with the current school principal being Annette Rome. BGS has approximately 180 enrolled students and is part of the Victorian School of Performing Arts.

Berwick Grammar School was opened by then Governor of Victoria, David de Kretser, on 9 November 2009.

Between the years 2009 (the foundation year of the school) and 2014, the school progressively expanded from offering years 5 to 7, to eventually becoming a year 5 to 12 school. In 2016, it was announced that by 2018 the Year 5 and 6 classes would be relocated to the St Margaret's junior school campus in Berwick, to focus on co-educational opportunities within the junior school.

== History ==
Berwick Grammar School was founded in 2009 as a brother school to St Margaret's School in Berwick, Victoria. While there was a previous school of the same name founded in Victoria in the 1800s, the former Berwick Grammar School no longer exists and is unrelated.

== Statistics ==
Berwick Grammar School, according to one source, is one of the highest-ranked schools in Melbourne's southeast, with an average study score of 31 out of 50 in 2020.

== Houses ==
There are three houses at BGS. These are Forsyth (yellow), Richards (red) and Battye (blue). Each year they compete in numerous inter-house competitions to win the annual house cup. These houses are named after prominent founding members of the school.

== Sport ==
Berwick Grammar is a member of the Southern Independent Schools (SIS).

=== SIS premierships ===
Berwick Grammar has won the following SIS senior premierships.

- Basketball (4) – 2014, 2015, 2017, 2019
- Soccer – 2016

== Notable alumni ==
- Alex Dekker, humanitarian worker, founder of the charity Alex Makes Meals.
