= Robert William Roper House =

Historic house in South Carolina, United States

- U.S. National Register of Historic Places
- U.S. National Historic Landmark
- U.S. National Historic Landmark District – Contributing property
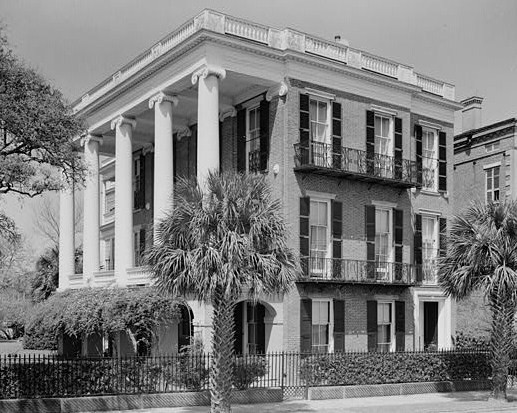
- Robert William Roper House (1940)

- Location within South Carolina Location within the United States
- Location: 9 E. Battery St., Charleston, South Carolina
- Coordinates: 32°46′15″N 79°55′43″W
- Built: 1838
- Architectural style: Greek Revival
- Part of: Charleston Historic District (ID66000964)
- NRHP reference No.: 73001692

Significant dates
- Added to NRHP: November 7, 1973
- Designated NHL: November 7, 1973
- Designated NHLDCP: October 9, 1960

The Robert William Roper House is an early-nineteenth-century house of architectural importance located at 9 East Battery in Charleston, South Carolina. It was built on land purchased in May 1838 by Robert W. Roper, a state legislator from the parish of St. Paul's, and a prominent member of the South Carolina Agricultural Society, whose income derived from his position as a cotton planter and slave holder. The house is considered to be an exemplar of Greek Revival architecture, built on a monumental scale. Although there are now two houses between Roper House and White Point Garden to the south, for a decade after its construction nothing stood between the house and the harbor beyond, making it the first and most prominent house to be seen by visitors approaching Charleston by sea.

The Roper House was declared a National Historic Landmark in 1973. That same year, the authors of the nomination form for the National Register of Historic Places described the house as "exceptional...well-proportioned and architecturally sophisticated...to be preserved and protected in situ at all costs."

== History ==
=== 1838–1851 (Robert and Martha Roper) ===
In 1836, the city of Charleston completed a new sea wall at the southeastern tip of the city, and contemplated building a park along South Bay Street extending north along East Bay Street. Short of funds, the city decided instead to subdivide the East Bay land into nine lots and sell them to pay for a smaller park along the South Battery. In May 1838, Robert W. Roper bought "Lot 5" and "Lot 6" (each with fifty feet of frontage along East Bay Street), the deed containing one restriction: "...that no house less than three stories high shall be erected thereon." In August 1839, having built his house tight to the north property line, Roper bought an additional eleven feet of frontage (part of "Lot 7") from his northerly neighbor, Isaac E. Holmes, an acquisition that allowed Roper to run a driveway around the north side of his house to the two-story carriage house at the back of the lot. When Roper died in 1845 he left to his wife, Martha Rutledge Roper, "his 560-acre Point Comfort Plantation with ninety-six slaves and the East Battery house." In April 1848, title to the house (including all 111 feet of East Bay frontage) was transferred to her, and in 1851, Mrs. Roper sold the house to Mary Coachman Allston.

=== 1851–1874 (Allston & Ravenel Era) ===
After Robert Roper bought part of "Lot 7" in 1839, the remainder of the lot fell into foreclosure and was sold at auction in 1842 to William Ravenel, a shipping merchant. Ravenel built a house in 1845, its colonnade nearly as grand as Roper's, featuring four monumental columns crowned with Grecian capitals modeled after the Tower of the Winds in Athens. Because the lot was narrow, Ravenel (or his architect) ingeniously ran a driveway through the ground floor of the house, with "the carriage entrance, running under the drawing-room." Nevertheless, Ravenel must have coveted Roper's slice of "Lot 7" and got a chance to get it when Mary Allston died. Her will was proved in July 1859, after which her executors sold Roper House to Ravenel. The two houses remained in common ownership through the Civil War years, but when Ravenel sold Roper House in 1874 to Rudolph Siegling, he reconfigured the property lines, retaining all of "Lot 7" and part of "Lot 6." Once again, Roper House sat tight to its northern property line, forcing Siegling to run a driveway across the south lawn, a conundrum eventually solved when the property was extended to create a service entrance at Church Street.

In the summer of 1864, during the Civil War, Maj. Edward Manigault made an entry in his diary: "The Roper House has had the architectural projection of the porch blown away by a shell." After two years of shelling by Union troops, the houses along East Battery stood vacant. In February 1865, near the end of the war, Gen. William Tecumseh Sherman (having completed his March to the Sea ending at Savannah) crossed into South Carolina. On the evening of February 17, Confederate troops began to evacuate the city, destroying artillery too heavy to move, including a large Blakely canon at the corner of South Battery and East Battery. According to one writer, as a result of the blast "a six-foot-long, 2,000-pound piece of the Blakely's tube came to rest in the attic [of Roper House], where it remains to this day."

=== 1874–1929 (Siegling Family) ===
Rudolph Siegling bought Roper House in August 1874, but one year later was still living at 189 King Street. He may have been renovating prior to taking occupancy, but in the 1878 Charleston Directory, he was living at Roper House, and by the time of the 1880 census, he was living there with his mother, his sister Elizabeth and his brother-in-law, John Horlbeck, a member of a family of architects and masons. Siegling, the son of the Prussian-born music publisher Johann Siegling, was himself a successful lawyer and publisher of Charleston's The News & Courier. By 1874, Roper House was in need of a renovation and Siegling had the wherewithal to pay for one.

From at least 1851 until 1874, a masonry wall, with rusticated piers and balusters, separated the Roper House garden from East Battery. Sometime after his purchase, but before 1886, Siegling replaced the wall with an iron fence, and replaced the war-damaged neoclassical porch (which was supported by two ionic columns) with an Italianate doorway. Siegling also modified two tripartite windows on the north facade, blocking up the flanking windows, and replacing the 6 part sash of the central windows with the then more fashionable 2 part style of sash. It is reasonable to infer that prior to Siegling's occupancy, all of Roper House's windows were the 6 part sash used ubiquitously in 1838.

On August 31, 1886, during Siegling's tenure at Roper House, Charleston was struck by a powerful earthquake resulting in sixty deaths, and tremendous damage to the city's structures. Next door, the portico of William Ravenel's house collapsed, but Roper House suffered minor damage — the east and north facades cracked, requiring patching and anchorage, but the monumental portico escaped unscathed; the Charleston city engineer pronounced it to be in "good" condition. In the years after the earthquake, Siegling demolished the old carriage house, and replaced it with a rear wing to the main house, faithfully reproducing Roper House's neoclassical bracketed cornice and balustrade. The new wing included a kitchen and a sixty-foot long ballroom. The house as altered by Siegling is very much the house as it exists today.

=== 1929–1952 (Solomon Guggenheim) ===
Solomon Guggenheim, heir to a copper mining fortune, but better known for having established the Guggenheim Museum, bought Roper House in late 1929 or early 1930 from Rudolph Siegling's daughter-in-law, Lucille L. Siegling. Guggenheim used the house as an occasional winter getaway, and his principal contributions to the appearance of the house were to maintain it well for two decades, and to convert Rudolph Siegling's ballroom to extra bedrooms. Guggenheim died in 1949 and his heirs sold the house three years later.

=== 1952–1968 (Drayton Hastie) ===
In May 1952, Mr. and Mrs. J. Drayton Hastie, owners of Magnolia Gardens, bought Roper House, making an apartment for themselves on the upper floor, and another for Hastie's recently widowed mother, Mrs. C. Norwood Hastie, on the main floor. Beginning in 1953, Mrs. Hastie's elegant apartment was a regular feature on the annual house tours conducted by the Historic Charleston Foundation, and was photographed in 1956 by Samuel and Narcissa Chamberlain for their book Southern Interiors of Charleston, South Carolina. In 1968, Drayton Hastie sold the house to Richard Jenrette but reserved a life tenancy on the main floor for his mother. Mrs. Hastie continued to live at Roper House until her death in 1981.

=== 1968–2018 (Richard H. Jenrette) ===
Richard Jenrette, a New York financier, well-known preservationist and collector of significant historic houses, bought Roper House in 1968, and took full possession in 1981 at the end of Mrs. Hastie's life tenancy. Over the next two years, he engaged the decorative painter Robert Jackson to marbleize the walls, installed blue and gold curtains, put down Scalamandré carpeting, furnished the principal rooms with a suite of Duncan Phyfe furniture, and hung portraits of George Washington and Andrew Jackson over the mantels. Kenneth and Martha Severens, writing in The Magazine Antiques, described it as "an exemplary restoration." Mr. Jenrette wrote two books about his half-century tenure at Roper House: Adventures with Old Houses (2005) and Columns by the Sea (2013). Jenrette died at Roper House on April 22, 2018.

=== 2018–Present (RHJF) ===
Roper House is currently owned by the Richard Hampton Jenrette Foundation, created by Richard Jenrette in 1993.

=== Gallery of site plans ===
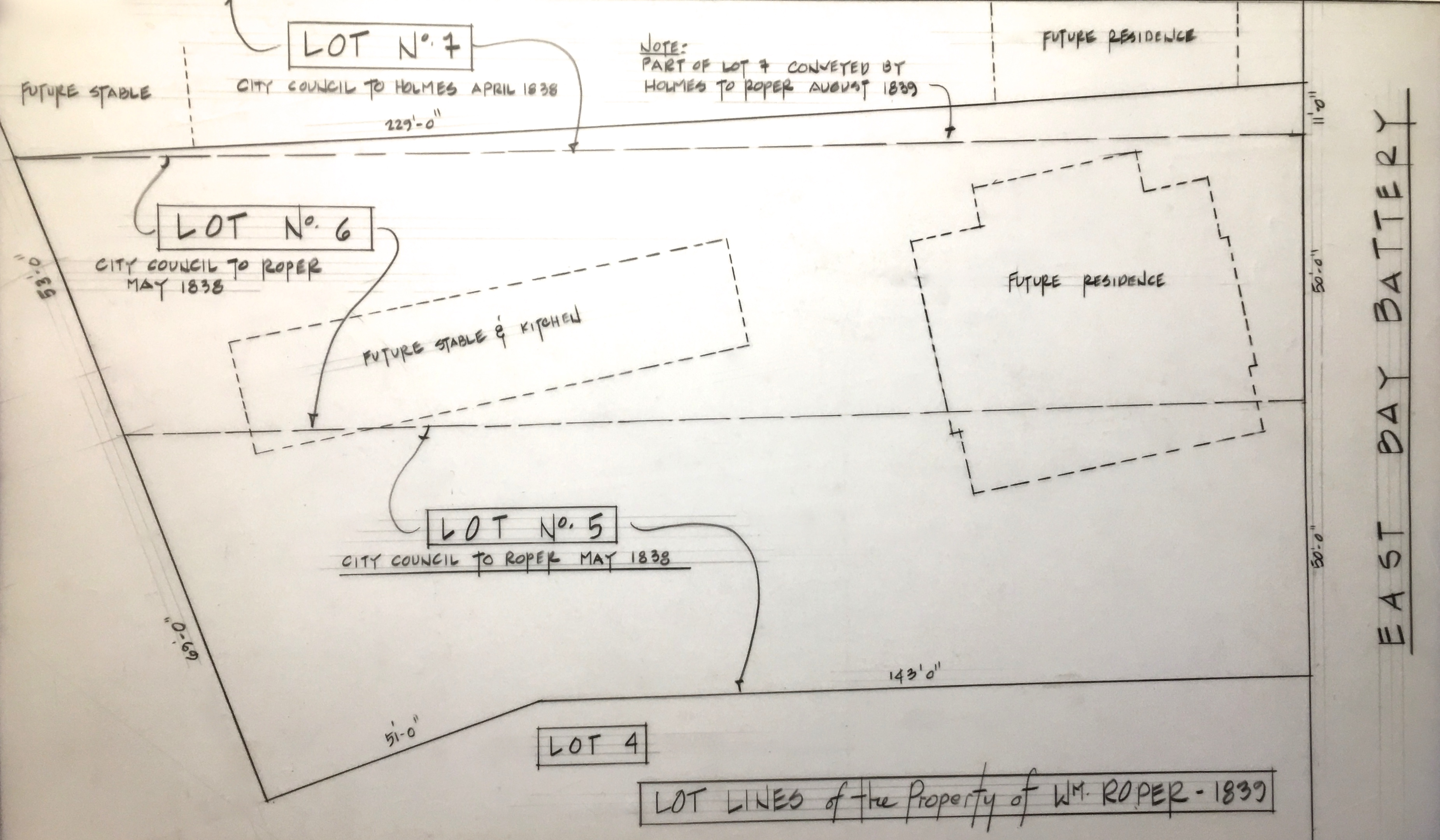
Sketch of Lots 5 and 6, purchased by Robert Roper in 1838, and part of Lot 7 purchased in 1839.

Sketch of lot lines of Roper House in 1874, as reconfigured by William Ravenel in 1874.

1929 survey showing Roper House property extended to Church Street.

== Attribution ==
The architect of Roper House is unknown and is likely to remain so, as no documentation has been found for nearly two centuries. In 1973, the authors of the nomination form for the National Register of Historic Places speculated that the architect Edward B. White “probably designed” the house, an idea first proposed by the historian Samuel Gaillard Stoney in 1953. Stoney called Roper House a "distinguished piece of classic revival designing," adding that "who Robert William Roper had for his architect is not now known, but the versatile and able Edward Brickell White, who designed many of the city's finest buildings...had just begun to practice in Charleston. There is a high likelihood of his being the architect."

Other candidates have been proposed: Kenneth and Martha Severens wrote in 1990 that, "circumstantial and stylistic evidence suggest that Charles F. Reichardt may have been the architect...the most persuasive argument for Reichardt as the architect of the Roper House is stylistic: the colossal five-columned piazza along the south side reflects similarly monumental colonnades on Reichardt's Meeting Street Theater, Charleston Hotel and Guard House."

== See also ==
- List of National Historic Landmarks in South Carolina
- National Register of Historic Places listings in Charleston, South Carolina
