= Marles (surname) =

Richard Marles (born 1967) is an Australian politician and the incumbent Deputy Prime Minister of Australia.

Marles may also refer to:

- Henry Marles (1871–1955), inventor of the Marles steering gear
- Fay Marles (1926–2024), Australian public servant and the mother of Richard Marles
