= Bruce Kingsbury =

Australian soldier, recipient of the Victoria Cross

Bruce Kingsbury VC
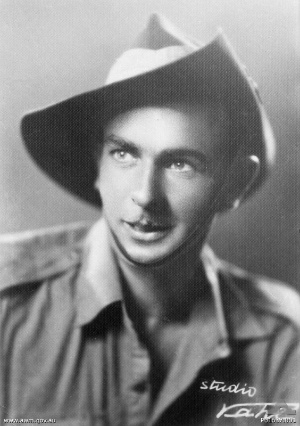
- Private Bruce Kingsbury, c. 1940
- Born: 8 January 1918; Melbourne, Australia
- Died: 29 August 1942 (aged 24); Isurava, Territory of Papua
- Military career
- Allegiance: Australia
- Branch: Second Australian Imperial Force
- Service years: 1940–42
- Rank: Private
- Units: 2/14th Infantry Battalion
- Conflicts: Second World War; North African Campaign; Syria–Lebanon Campaign; Battle of Jezzine; Pacific War; New Guinea campaign; Kokoda Track Campaign; Battle of Isurava †
- Awards: Victoria Cross

Bruce Steel Kingsbury, VC (8 January 1918 – 29 August 1942) was an Australian soldier of the Second World War. Serving initially in the Middle East, he later gained renown for his actions during the Battle of Isurava, one of many battles forming the Kokoda Track Campaign in the south-east of the island of New Guinea, then part of the Australian Territory of Papua (now Papua New Guinea) . His bravery during the battle was recognised with the Victoria Cross, the highest decoration for gallantry "in the face of the enemy" that can be awarded to members of the British and Commonwealth armed forces. The first serviceman to receive the VC for actions on Australian territory, Kingsbury was a member of the 2/14th Infantry Battalion.

On 29 August 1942, during the Battle of Isurava, Kingsbury was one of the few survivors of a platoon that had been overrun by the Japanese. He immediately volunteered to join a different platoon, which had been ordered to counter-attack. Rushing forward and firing his Bren gun from the hip, he cleared a path through the enemy and inflicted several casualties. Kingsbury was then shot by a sniper and killed instantly. His actions, which delayed the Japanese long enough for the Australians to fortify their positions, were instrumental in saving his battalion's headquarters and he was posthumously awarded the Victoria Cross as a result.

== Early life ==
Born in the Melbourne suburb of Preston on 8 January 1918, Kingsbury was the second son of Philip Blencowe Kingsbury, an estate agent, and his wife Florence Annie (née Steel). Growing up in Prahran, Kingsbury became friends with Alan Richard Avery when he was five years old. The two often raced billy carts down the hilly streets, and would remain lifelong friends. Kingsbury attended Windsor State School as a child, and his results were good enough to earn a scholarship at Melbourne Technical College. Avery began an agricultural course in Longerenong. Although qualified as a printer, Kingsbury began working at his father's real estate business, a job he disliked.

Unhappy in the estate agency, Kingsbury took up the position of caretaker on a farm at Boundary Bend, not far from where Avery was working. After three months, the pair decided that they would go on an adventure—walking through western Victoria and New South Wales. In February 1936, Kingsbury and Avery left their jobs and began travelling north, working on several farms and estates. The pair eventually arrived in Sydney several months later, and returned to Melbourne on the first train back. Kingsbury resumed working as a real estate agent, and Avery worked as a nurseryman. They spent their free time at dances and parties. During this time, Kingsbury and Avery met and became close to sisters Leila Edith Bradbury and Annie Margaret Bradbury. As the war in Europe escalated, Kingsbury and Avery made up their minds to enlist. Despite his parents' disapproval, Kingsbury signed up to the Australian Imperial Force on 29 May 1940.

== Second World War ==
=== Middle East ===
Kingsbury was originally assigned to the 2/2nd Pioneer Battalion, but requested a transfer to the 2/14th Infantry Battalion to join Avery who had, coincidentally, enlisted on the same day at a different recruitment centre. The pair undertook basic training at Puckapunyal, where they were assigned to the same section (7 Section of 9 Platoon) and were given drill instruction, rifle drill and mock battle training. After 7 Section learned they would be sent overseas, Kingsbury informed Avery that he planned to propose to Leila. The pair went to Melbourne to try to organise the wedding. Although Kingsbury gave Leila a wristwatch as an engagement present, they could not arrange a marriage licence before he left, and the marriage never took place.

Kingsbury, along with the rest of the 7th Division, was shipped to the Middle East in late 1940. Spending time in Tel Aviv and the surrounding areas, the 7th Division continued training and awaited further orders. On 9 April, the division was sent forward to Mersa Matruh in Egypt to support the Commonwealth force's defences. It replaced a Scottish unit and took up positions in the garrison. On 23 May, Kingsbury's brigade was sent back to Palestine, en route to battle in Syria and Lebanon. The 2/14th fought against the Vichy French on the Lebanese mountain ranges, as part of a three-pronged attack on Beirut. During this time, the division fought in many towns, including a major battle in Jezzine, where Avery was wounded by a grenade—which drove metal splinters into his spine—and awarded the Military Medal for his "cool courage and devotion". As the war with the Vichy French was winding down, on 11 July Kingsbury and Avery were selected for a contingent to collect and bury the dead. The battalion stayed in Beirut for a few months, until setting up a semi-permanent camp at Hill 69, outside Jerusalem.

On 30 January 1942, the 7th Division left Egypt for Australia, sailing via Bombay, as the division was needed to fight against the Japanese. Kingsbury's battalion made landfall at Adelaide and continued to Melbourne by rail. The battalion arrived on 16 March, and was given a week's leave. After this, the battalion underwent training in Glen Innes, before camping in Yandina, Queensland. On 5 August, the battalion moved north to Brisbane, boarding a ship to Port Moresby to join the fighting in New Guinea, where a force of mostly Militia personnel were engaged in a desperate defensive action.

=== Kokoda Track Campaign ===
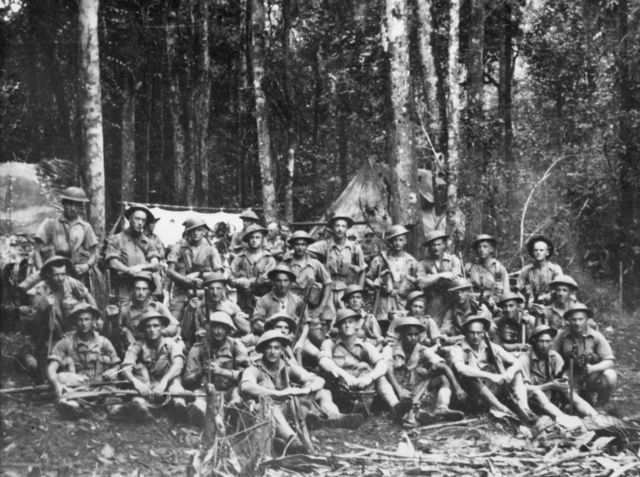
Kingsbury with the other members of his platoon on 16 August 1942. Kingsbury is second from the left in the bottom row. The man right next to him is Private Harry Saunders, brother of Reg Saunders, the first Aboriginal Australian to be commissioned in the Australian Army.

Following the Battle of the Coral Sea, the Japanese abandoned the attempt to capture Port Moresby from the sea and, on 21 July, landed ground forces at Buna in north-east Papua. After capturing the town of Kokoda for the second time on 9 August, the Japanese began advancing along the Kokoda Track towards Port Moresby. The 2,500-strong Japanese force met the 39th and 53rd Infantry Battalions, at the town of Isurava. As the battle was beginning to develop, on 26 August, members of the 2/14th, including Kingsbury, arrived at Isurava to reinforce the exhausted 39th Battalion.

==== Battle of Isurava ====
The two combined battalions began digging in around Isurava. A headquarters had been set up at the top of the hill, which was vital to the defence of the position. While the Australians dug themselves in, the Japanese, led by Japanese Major General Tomitarō Horii, prepared to attack. On 28 August, the Japanese launched their offensive. The Australians, who had initially been outnumbered but were now roughly equal in strength, resisted in the face of heavy machine-gun fire and hand-to-hand combat. On 29 August, the Japanese broke through the right flank, pushing the Australians back with heavy fire, threatening to cut off their headquarters. The Australians began to prepare a counter-offensive, and men volunteered to join an attack party. Kingsbury, one of the few survivors of his platoon, ran down the track with the group.

You could see his Bren gun held out and his big bottom swaying as he went with the momentum he was getting up, followed by Alan Avery. They were cheerful. They were going out on a picnic almost.

— Lieutenant Colonel Phil Rhoden, The Spirit of Kokoda

Using a Bren gun he had taken from wounded Corporal Lindsay Bear, Kingsbury, alongside Avery and the rest of the group, engaged the nearby Japanese. The fire was so heavy that the undergrowth was completely destroyed within five minutes. It was then that Kingsbury, firing from his hip, charged straight at the Japanese.

He came forward with this Bren and he just mowed them down. He was an inspiration to everybody else around him. There were clumps of Japs here and there and he just mowed them down.

— Private Allen Avery, The Spirit of Kokoda

His actions demoralised the Japanese, killing several and forcing others to find cover. The rest of the Australian group, inspired by Kingsbury's actions, forced the Japanese further back into the jungle. Kingsbury was then shot and mortally wounded by a Japanese sniper. The sniper fired one shot before disappearing. Avery, who had been about 6 feet (1.8 m) from Kingsbury, briefly chased after the sniper but returned to carry Kingsbury to the regimental aid post; Kingsbury was dead by the time he arrived there.

== Legacy ==
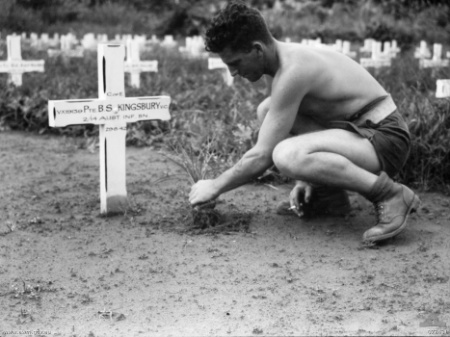
Signalman R. Williams tending to Kingsbury's grave in 1944

Kingsbury's actions were a turning point in the battle. The Japanese had begun to gather momentum in their attack, and were threatening to overrun the 2/14th's headquarters. His attack inflicted damage to the Japanese force, temporarily halting their advance. This allowed the Australian troops to stabilise their positions, eventually regaining control and defending the battalion's headquarters. His act of bravery served as an inspiration to the troops. The battle ended in defeat for the Australians, elements of the 2/14th breaking during the afternoon of 29 August. The remainder of the battalion was able to withdraw during the night, but suffered heavy casualties and another defeat fighting the next day at positions around the Isurava Guest House.

Authors and military analysts have speculated that had Kingsbury not attacked, the Japanese might have destroyed the battalion. The Japanese had been attacking in waves, and had started to climb a steep hill to outflank the Australians, in an effort to win the battle. The Australians were low on supplies and the Japanese were on the verge of breaking through the Australian line. Had they broken through, they would have been able to isolate the battalion's headquarters from the soldiers on the flanks. This would have prevented the Australians from retreating to Alola, allowing the Japanese to overrun them.

For his actions, Kingsbury was awarded the Victoria Cross, which was gazetted on 9 February 1943. His citation read:

War Office, 9th February, 1943.

The KING has been graciously pleased to approve the posthumous award of the VICTORIA CROSS to: —

No. VX 19139 Private. Bruce Steel Kingsbury, Australian Military Forces.

In New Guinea, the Battalion to which Private Kingsbury belonged had been holding a position in the Isurava area for two days against continuous and fierce enemy attacks. On the 29th August, 1942, the enemy attacked in such force that they succeeded in breaking through the Battalion's right flank, creating a serious threat both to the rest of the Battalion and to its Headquarters. To avoid the situation becoming more desperate, it was essential to regain immediately the lost ground on the right flank.

Private Kingsbury, who was one of the few survivors of a Platoon which had been overrun and severely cut about by the enemy, immediately volunteered to join a different platoon which had been ordered to counter-attack.

He rushed forward firing his Bren Gun from the hip through terrific machine-gun fire and succeeded in clearing a path through the enemy. Continuing to sweep the enemy positions with his fire and inflicting an extremely high number of casualties on them, Private Kingsbury was then seen to fall to the ground shot dead, by the bullet from a sniper hiding in the wood.

Private Kingsbury displayed a complete disregard for his own safety. His initiative and superb courage made possible the recapture of the position which undoubtedly saved Battalion Headquarters, as well as causing heavy casualties amongst the enemy. His coolness, determination and devotion to duty in the face of great odds was an inspiration to his comrades.

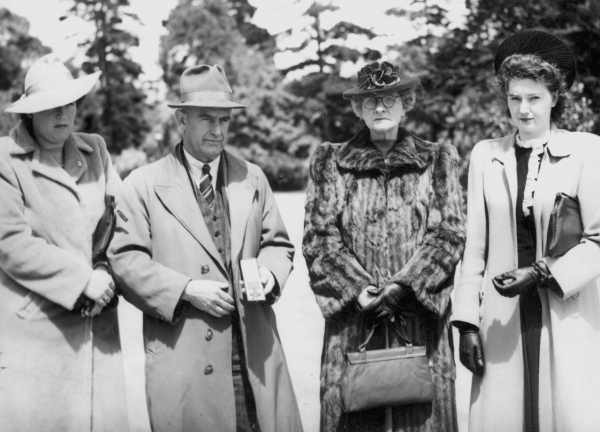
Kingsbury's family accepting the Victoria Cross on his behalf - sister Jeanne Pope, father Philip Kingsbury, mother Florence Kingsbury & fiancée Leila Bradbury

Kingsbury was the first Australian soldier to be awarded the Victoria Cross for actions in the South Pacific and also the first on Australian territory. Kingsbury's section remains the most highly decorated section in the British Empire, its members having received a Victoria Cross, one Distinguished Conduct Medal and four Military Medals by war's end; the platoon also suffered the highest proportional losses in the Kokoda Campaign. Kingsbury's platoon sergeant, Sergeant Robert Thompson, later commented that when he was recommending Kingsbury for the Victoria Cross, he was asked several times would he "please write it up a bit more with a bit more action and such" and

On the same day or the next day there was another chap named Charlie McCarthy [sic, McCallum], who really did something, probably far more deserving but they were only going to award one VC, so Bruce got it. I'm not decrying it. He was worded up and Charlie unfortunately was worded down …

Kingsbury's Rock, the rock next to which Kingsbury died, stands within sight of where the 2/14th Battalion's headquarters had been established, and has been incorporated as part of the Isurava Memorial. His body now rests in the Bomana Cemetery, Port Moresby, and his Victoria Cross is on display at the Australian War Memorial, Canberra. The Melbourne suburb of Kingsbury was named in his honour, as was a rest area on the Remembrance Driveway and a street in the Canberra suburb of Gowrie. Kingsbury's story was featured in the History Channel production For Valour.
