= Jennifer McKay =

Australian academic

Jennifer McKay AM
- McKay in 2026
- Born: Jennifer Margaret McKay; Melbourne, Victoria, Australia
- Children: 2

Academic background
- Education: University of Melbourne (BA, PhD); University of Adelaide; University of South Australia (LLB); University of California, Berkeley

Academic work
- Discipline: Law
- Sub-discipline: Environmental law, water law and governance
- Institutions: University of Adelaide; University of South Australia; Adelaide University
- Website: University profile

Jennifer Margaret McKay is an Australian legal academic and solicitor specialising in water law, environmental policy, and governance. Jennifer was appointed Professor of Business Law at the University of South Australia in 2000, while she had been made part-time commissioner of South Australia's Environment, Resources and Development Court since 1995.

McKay is from Melbourne, and she attended Blackburn High School. At the University of Melbourne, McKay received a choral scholarship at Trinity College, completed her Bachelor of Arts with honours and then pursued doctoral research in geography. She later did law at the University of Adelaide, receiving her Bachelor of Laws in 1988, followed by a Graduate Diploma in Legal Practice from the University of South Australia in 1990.

McKay has been a research fellow at the University of Adelaide, and a solicitor at Finlaysons. She became a lecturer at the University of South Australia in 1992, and went on to become a senior lecturer and associate professor. McKay was also the acting head of the School of Law and Legal Practice, and director of the Centre for Comparative Water Policies and Laws. Between 2008 and 2009, McKay was involved in Fulbright research at the University of California, Berkeley, studying sustainability in Australian and United States water laws.

McKay has been affiliated as an adjunct academic faculty member with the Australian National University and the University of Fiji. She was awarded the South Australia Premier's Medal in 2020, while she was elected a Distinguished Fellow of the International Water Resources Association in 2021. She was appointed Member of the Order of Australia in the 2023 King's Birthday Honours in recognition of her service to the legal profession and the arts.

== Early life and education ==
Jennifer Margaret McKay was born and raised in Melbourne. She went to Blackburn High School and graduated in 1975 as a music scholar and dux in English.

McKay graduated from the University of Melbourne (UniMelb) with a Bachelor of Arts degree with honours in geography and psychology as well as English literature in 1981. McKay received a choral scholarship at Trinity College. She sang in the college choir between 1978 and 1981. In 1980, McKay played a nurse in scenes shot in Adelaide for Peter Weir's film Gallipoli.

McKay later proceeded to do master's degree and PhD in environmental studies and geography respectively from UniMelb. The subject of her doctoral thesis was that of floodplain management in Australia which she received assistance from the Australian Water Resources Council as a result of the Commonwealth Government Scholarship she got. During the course of her doctorate, McKay transferred to Adelaide in 1981 where she became the first ever female assistant dean of St Mark's College, which she continued to do till 1982. McKay prepared the college for co-education and mentored the college's first female students.

In 1984, McKay came back to Adelaide where she studied law in the University of Adelaide in addition to her work as a research fellow in the university's departments of economics and geography. She was the editor of The Economics of Bushfires: The South Australian Experience, published by Oxford University Press. McKay obtained her Bachelor of Laws in 1988 and was a solicitor at Finlaysons between 1988 and 1993. In 1990, she obtained her Graduate Diploma in Legal Practice from University of South Australia.

== Career ==
At University of South Australia, McKay was employed as a lecturer at the School of Commerce in 1992. She attained the position of senior lecturer at the School of International Business in 1993 and associate professor between 1996 and 2000. She acted as the head of the law school at University of South Australia between 1998 and 1999 and got the position of Professor of Business Law in 2000. During the 2000s, she was also the director of the centre for comparative water policies and laws at the university.

In 1990, McKay joined the Law Society of South Australia. She was part of the society's Legal Education Committee between 1992 and 1993 and Commercial Law Committee between 1994 and 2000. In 1995, she got the part-time appointment as commissioner of the Environment, Resources and Development Court of South Australia. Her duties in the court involved mediation as well.

McKay served on the State Water Resources Council from 2003 to 2008 and was one of the founding members of the Australian Water Association's Water Policy and Law Interest Group from 2004 to 2015. On 27 July 2006, she was appointed to the Natural Resources Management Council in South Australia until 29 April 2007. She became a member of the editorial board of the Australasian Journal of Environmental Management in 2006 and the International Water Association's Strategic Council from 2007 to 2010.

McKay carried out her research at the University of California, Berkeley from September 2008 to September 2009 as a Fulbright Visiting Scholar under the mentorship of Daniel Farber. Her research was focused on the integration of sustainability into the laws relating to water allocation and usage in Australia and the United States. During this period, McKay earned a Graduate Diploma in Human Rights Law from American University as a fellow in 2009.

In 2016, McKay was appointed as an adjunct professor of the Fenner School of the Australian National University (ANU) and an ambassador for the Defence Reserves Support Council. She was on the South Australian panel for the Australian American Fulbright Program between 2016 and 2019 and then again between 2021 and 2023. In 2019, McKay was appointed as an adjunct professor of the ANU College of Law and a senior editor of the Journal of Environmental Law of the Academy of Environmental Law. She is also a member of the World Commission on Environmental Law of the International Union for Conservation of Nature.

McKay organised the 7th Frontiers in Environmental Law Colloquium for the IUCN Academy of Environmental Law in 2021. In that same year, she was acting as the ethics officer of the University of South Australia, Justices and Society and has worked as the member of the committee on Human Rights Law, Administrative and Public Law and Planning, Environment and Local Government Committee of the Law Society. She has worked as the board member of the Australian Fulbright Alumni Association in 2022 and organised the Australian Legal Research Awards in 2023.

In 2023, Mckay has obtained the Graduate Certificate in Education (Online Learning). Additionally, in 2023, she was appointed to be the adjunct faculty at the University of Fiji. In 2025, she is serving as the ambassador of the Australia Day Council of South Australia.

== Honours and awards ==
McKay was designated as an Honorary Fellow of the International Water Association in 2004. In 2008, McKay received a Fulbright Scholar Award and was nominated for the South Australian Women's Honour Roll. She also got the Senior Research Excellence Award for Established Researcher by University of South Australia in 2009 and 2011. In 2020, McKay got the Premier's Medal by the South Australian Government and the Australian Water Association, for her contribution in water research. In 2021, she was elected as a Distinguished Fellow of the International Water Resources Association. And McKay was also elected as a Fellow of the International Water Association in 2022.

For the 2023 King's Birthday Honours, McKay was made an Member of the Order of Australia (AM) for her contributions to the legal profession and to the arts. In 2025, McKay received the designation of Senior Fellow from the Higher Education Academy. In the same year, she won the Academic/Researcher of the Year award in the Lawyers Weekly Women in Law Awards.

== Personal life ==
McKay is married with two children. In 1988, together with her husband bought Baroona, a Federation style home in St Peters, South Australia. As part of the terms of the agreement, the previous owner of the property, Eric McLaughlin, reserved the right of tenancy for parts of the house for his lifetime. He soon became part of the family and died seven years after this. McKay and her daughter, Monica McKay-Bignold, appeared in the "Baroona" episode of the ABC TV show Who's Been Sleeping in My House?, which aired on 19 April 2013. This episode involved an investigation into the original builder of the house, R. J. Coombs, who was a wool merchant, as well as the rumour of the use of the attic wires in the house as a hidden radio station during World War II.

Since 1980, McKay has been collecting editions of John Bunyan's The Pilgrim's Progress. She started with the paperback that her grandfather, Augustine Murphy, presented to her. Subsequently, she purchased some more copies at Masonic temples and charity shops in Melbourne; also, she has been collecting these editions in Australia and England. Her collection included 200 copies in 140 editions by 2010, when the University of South Australia Library displayed her collection in March and April of the same year.

McKay has donated prizes for excellence in English since 2009 to the Blackburn High School. Since 2012, she has been fundraising for the children's charity Variety. She has participated in nine charity car cruises in South Australia and elsewhere. In 2018, she finished the Heysen Trail.

== Selected publications ==
In June 2023, McKay has made more than 180 publications.

=== Books ===
- Potter, Emily; Mackinnon, Alison; McKenzie, Stephen; McKay, Jennifer, eds. (2007). Fresh Water: New Perspectives on Water in Australia. Melbourne University Press. ISBN 9780522854244.
- Lukasiewicz, Anna; Dovers, Stephen; Robin, Libby; McKay, Jennifer; Schilizzi, Steven; Graham, Sonia, eds. (2017). Natural Resources and Environmental Justice: Australian Perspectives. CSIRO Publishing. ISBN 9781486306374.

=== Journal articles ===
- Bjornlund, Henning; McKay, Jennifer (1998). "Factors affecting water prices in a rural water market: A south Australian experience". Water Resources Research. 34 (6): 1563–1570. doi:10.1029/97WR03470.
- Bjornlund, Henning; McKay, Jennifer (2002). "Aspects of water markets for developing countries: experiences from Australia, Chile, and the US". Environment and Development Economics. 7 (4): 769–795. doi:10.1017/S1355770X02000463.
- McKay, Jennifer (2005). "Water institutional reforms in Australia". Water Policy. 7 (1): 35–52. doi:10.2166/wp.2005.0003.
- Hurlimann, Anna; McKay, Jennifer (2007). "Urban Australians using recycled water for domestic non-potable use—An evaluation of the attributes price, saltiness, colour and odour using conjoint analysis". Journal of Environmental Management. 83 (1): 93–104. doi:10.1016/j.jenvman.2006.02.008. PMID 16678338.
- Hurlimann, Anna; Hemphill, Elizabeth; McKay, Jennifer; Geursen, Gus (2008). "Establishing components of community satisfaction with recycled water use through a structural equation model". Journal of Environmental Management. 88 (4): 1221–1232. doi:10.1016/j.jenvman.2007.06.002. PMID 17662519.
