= Australian Water Association =

Australian non-profit organisation

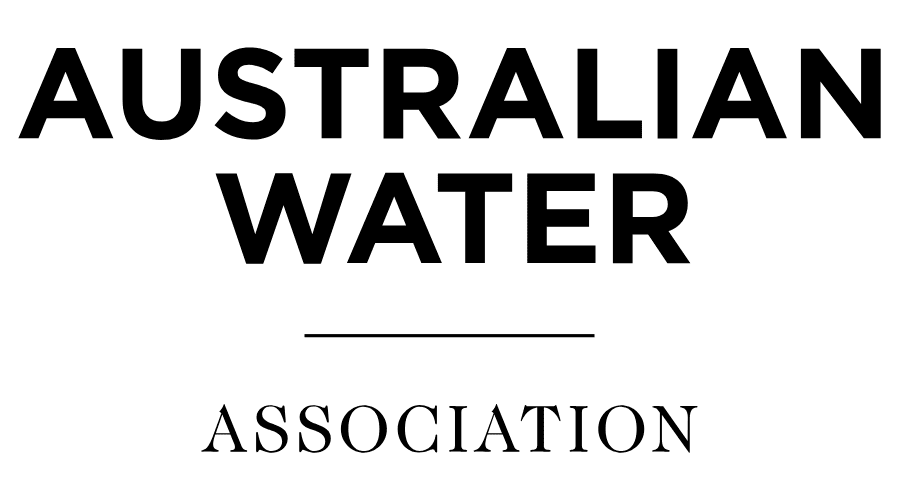
- Formation: 1962
- Type: Peak body
- Headquarters: St Leonards, New South Wales, Australia
- Website: www.awa.asn.au

Australian Water Association (AWA) is a non-profit organisation that serves as the peak body for the Australian water industry. It is a member of the International Water Association.

== History ==
The AWA was formed in June 1962 as the Australian Water and Wastewater Association (AWWA), with state branches in New South Wales, Queensland, South Australia, and Victoria. The first federal convention of the AWWA was held in Canberra in 1964. An Australian Capital Territory (ACT) branch was formed in 1968, which was joined by the Northern Territory, Tasmania and Western Australia branches in the 1970s.

By 2022, the AWA had over 5,000 individual and organizational members.

== Activities ==
In 1974, the AWWA established Water as its official journal. It switched to an e-journal format in 2016.

The AWA has hosted the annual OzWater conference since 1993. It is a partner in the Department of Foreign Affairs and Trade's Australian Water Partnership, which supports water management initiatives in the Indo-Pacific.

== See also ==
- Water supply and sanitation in Australia
