= Abbas Rajabifard =

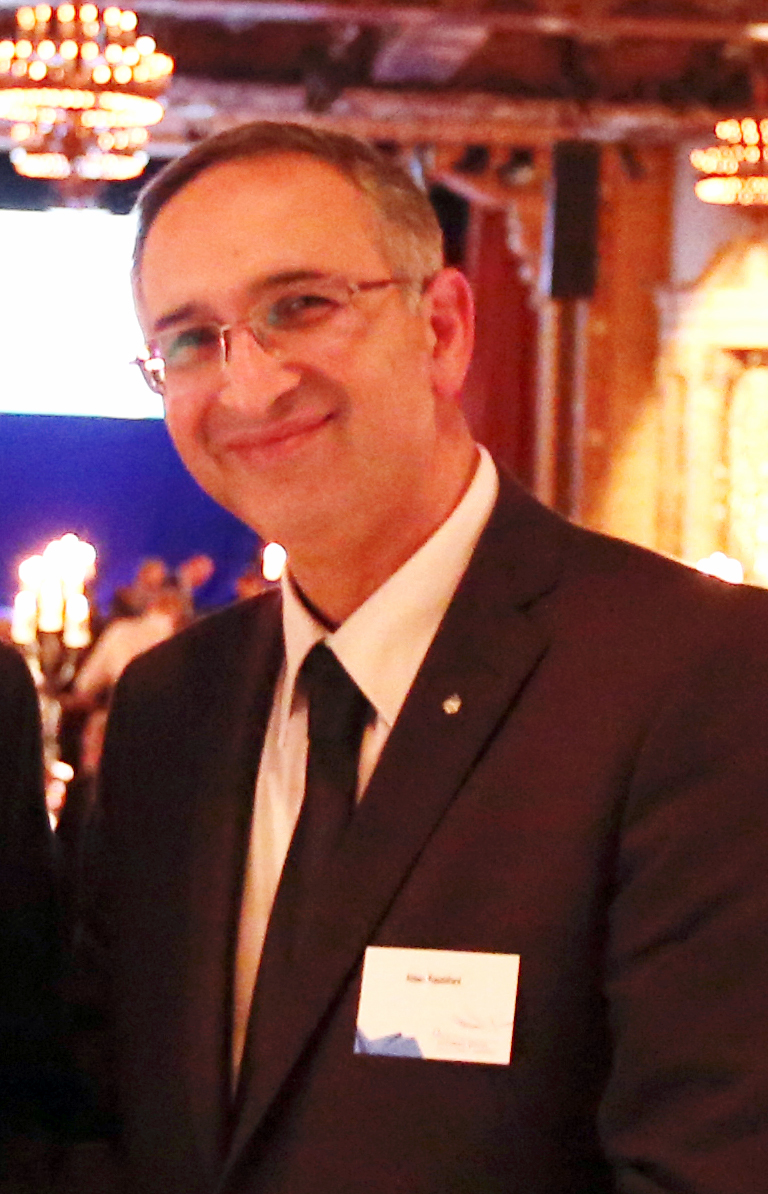
- Abbas Rajabifard
- Born: 23 August 1966 (age 60)
- Scientific career
- Fields: Geoinformation, GIS, Digital Twin

Abbas Rajabifard (Persian: عباس رجبی‌فرد; born 23 August 1966) is an Iranian-Australian academic and Professor at the University of Melbourne. He is Director of Smart and Sustainable Development and Discipline Leader of the Geomatics Department within the Melbourne School of Engineering, and Director of the Centre for Spatial Data Infrastructures and Land Administration (CSDILA).

== Career ==
Rajabifard is Discipline Leader of Geomatics in the Department of Infrastructure Engineering and Director of CSDILA at the University of Melbourne. He also was Director of Smart and Sustainable Development and Leader of the Infrastructure Platform within the Faculty of Engineering and IT. He was Head of the Infrastructure Engineering Department from 2012 to 2020.

Rajabifard was Chair of the Academic Network of the United Nations Global Geospatial Information Management (UN-GGIM) from 2016 to 2020.

== 2026 investigations and controversy ==
In May 2026, The Guardian Australia published an investigation examining Rajabifard's professional and institutional links to Iranian political figures associated with the Iranian regime and the IRGC.

The Guardian reported that Rajabifard had been listed as a co-author alongside Ghalibaf on a March 2023 article about the political economy of the Islamic Republic, published in an Iranian academic journal. Rajabifard said he had never collaborated with Ghalibaf, that his name had been added without his knowledge, and that he learned of it only in January 2026 and asked for it to be removed. According to the Guardian, his name was removed from the journal's website in February 2026. The reports also detailed Rajabifard's previous engagement with the University of Tehran, including participation in academic delegations and seminars during 2016 and 2017.

Additional reporting by The Guardian identified links between Rajabifard's research centre at the University of Melbourne and Eshagh Ghalibaf, son of Mohammad Bagher Ghalibaf, who studied and worked at the university between 2015 and 2018. According to the investigation, Eshagh Ghalibaf worked as a research assistant at CSDILA while Rajabifard was head of the Infrastructure Engineering Department.

The controversy emerged amid heightened Australian government scrutiny of research collaborations involving Iranian institutions and entities associated with the IRGC.
