= Torsten Seemann =

Australian biologist

- Education: Monash University (BSc Hons; PhD)
- Scientific career
- Fields: Microbial genomics Computational genomics Epidemiology
- Workplaces: University of Melbourne; The Royal Melbourne Hospital
- Thesis: Digital Image Processing using Local Image Segmentation (2002)
- Doctoral advisor: Peter Tischer

Torsten Seemann is an Australian bioinformatician, academic and researcher that is known for developing tools and methods for analysing genomic data from bacterial pathogens. He is a professor at University of Melbourne's Department of Microbiology and Immunology. His current research focuses on investigating pathogen evolution, transmission and drug-resistance.
