= Ian Renard =

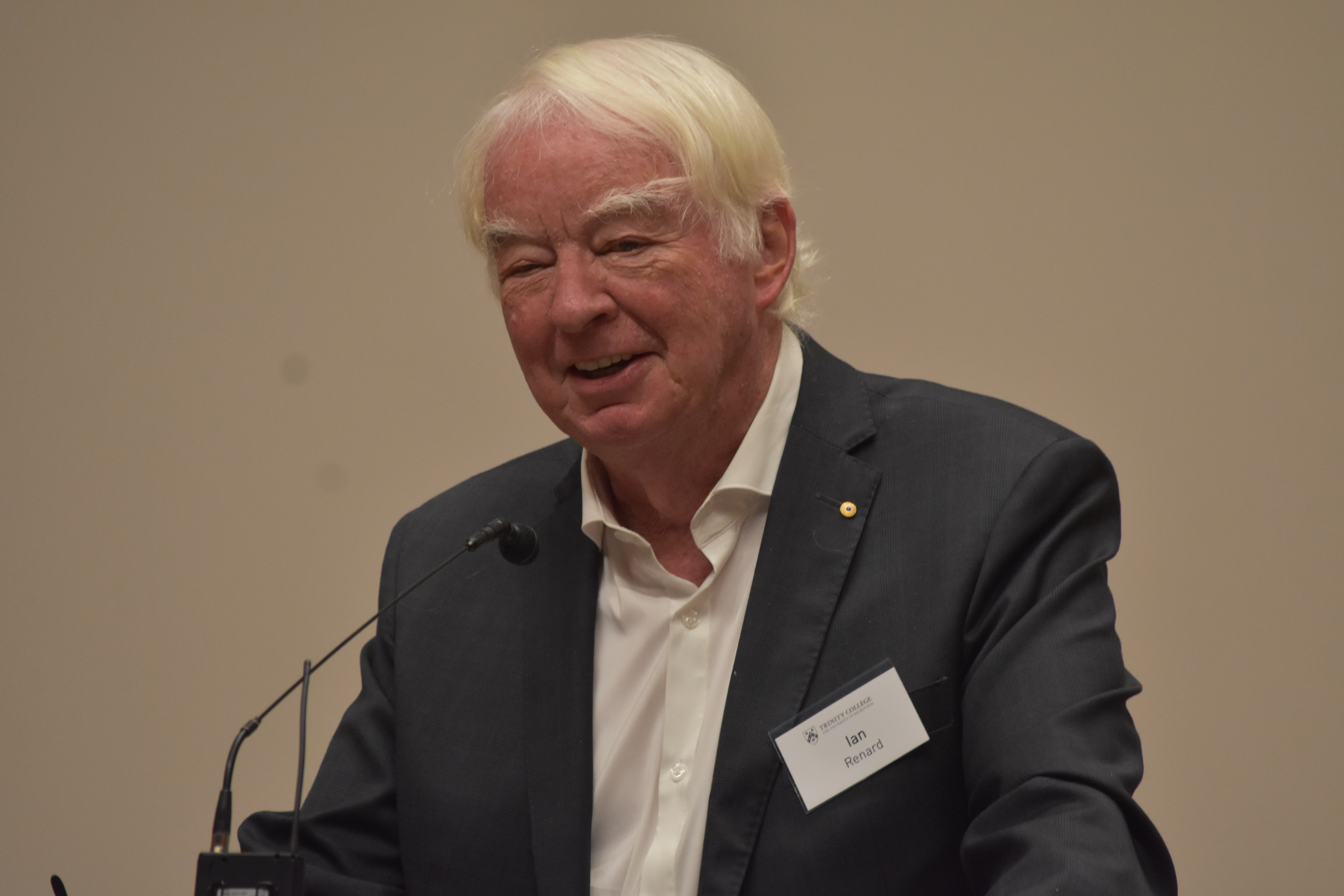
Renard in 2025 at Trinity College

Ian Renard AM was the 19th Chancellor of the University of Melbourne, from February 2005 to January 2009. He holds a Master of Laws from the university, is an alumnus of Ormond College, along with being a former President of the Melbourne University Liberal Club from 1966 to 1968. Renard is a former partner of major Australian law firm Allens Arthur Robinson. He was the chairman of the Melbourne Theatre Company. Ian Renard is the chairman of the RE Ross Trust.

Academic offices
Preceded by Fay Marles	Chancellor of the University of Melbourne; 2005–2009	Succeeded by Alex Chernov
