= Elizabeth Scarr =

Australian scientist

Elizabeth Scarr is an Australian scientist. Her research investigates the chemical changes in the brain associated schizophrenia and bipolar disorder.

== Early life and education ==
Associate Professor Elizabeth Scarr got her BSc honours degree in pharmacology at Sunderland University, United Kingdom in 1989. She then moved to Canada and finished her PhD in Neuropsychopharmacology at the University of Saskatchewan in 1995. During her PhD candidature in Canada she came to realize when schizophrenia patients shared their experiences with her that she wanted to move in this field of research. She then spent a year as a post doctoral position and worked on rat hypoxic ischaemic models in Dunedin, New Zealand in 1995.

== Work ==
After her postdoc year in New Zealand Elizabeth moved to Melbourne in 1996 and started working with human postmortem tissue at the Rebecca L. Cooper research laboratories which used to be part of the Mental Health research Institute.

Elizabeth has worked as a senior research fellow at the Mental Health Research Institute (January 2005 – January 2011). As Australian Research Council Future Fellow (2010–2014) in the Department of Psychiatry, Elizabeth's worked with Professor Brian Dean, who is the head of the Rebecca L. Cooper Research Laboratories at the Mental Health Research Institute. Their work lead to the identification of a subgroup of people with schizophrenia who have low levels of the protein, muscarinic M1 receptor and is known to be important in memory and attention. Currently Elizabeth Scarr is an associate professor at the Department of Psychiatry at the University of Melbourne researching the biochemistry of psychiatric disorders such as schizophrenia and bipolar disorder. She also is the project leader of Cooperative Research Centre for Mental Health (2012 – Present) and the leader of the Psychiatric Neuropathalogy laboratorium at the University of Melbourne (January 2011 – Present). Her work is focused on working towards understanding chemical changes that are associated with schizophrenia and bipolar disorder in close collaboration with molecular psychiatry laboratory.

She is affiliated to Australian Society for Psychiatric Research since 2006, Collegium Internationale Neuro-Psychopharmacologicum 2004, Society for Neuroscience since 2003, Australian Neuroscience Society since 1997 and the Australian Society for Medical Research 2000–2007.

Her research has led to the publication of 73 peer-reviewed articles and 3 book chapters so far.

== Awards and honors ==
Recently Elizabeth Scarr has been named in the innovation category of the 100 Women of Influence 2014 by Westpac and the Australian financial review. She has been recognised for her large contribution in adding knowledge to the treatment and understanding of Schizophrenia. She is a recipient of several grants and awards. She received an award from Finkel Foundation 2003, the Collegium Internationale Neuro-Psychopharmacologicum in 2000 and the International Congress in Schizophrenia research in 1998.

She has been the recipient of several major grants (see list below) in the last decade.

- Tumour necrosis factor (TNF) signalling in mood disorders and Schizophrenaia - Project Grants awarded by NHMRC 2014–2016
- Muscarinic receptors in the human brain: In health and in sickness - Project Grants awarded by NHMRC 2013–2015
- The Role of TGFB1 in the Pathophysiology of Late Stage Schizophrenia - Project Grants awarded by NHMRC 2013–2015
- Resolving the Structures of Human Muscarinic M1 and M4 Receptors - Discovery Projects awarded by the Australian Research Council 2011–2014
- Understanding the changes in brain chemistry associated with schizophrenia - Future Fellowships awarded by the Australian Research Council 2010–2014
- Defining the pathology of a sub-type of schizophrenia- Project Grants awarded by NHMRC 2009–2011
- Biochemical basis of cognitive deficit in schizophrenia - Mental Illness Research Royce Abbey Postdoctoral Fellowship awarded by the Australian Rotary Health Research Fund 2008–2011
- Studies on the mechanisms by which muscarinic receptors might cause schizophrenia - Project Grants awarded by NHMRC 2008–2010
- Muscarinic M1 receptor cognition and schizophrenia - Project Grants awarded by NHMRC 2005–2007
