= Katja Hölttä-Otto =

Finnish engineer

Katja Hölttä-Otto is a Finnish mechanical engineer and an expert in modular product design. She has worked as an engineering processor in Finland, Singapore, the US, and Australia; she is Professor of Engineering Design at the University of Melbourne.

== Education and career ==
Hölttä-Otto earned a master's degree in mechanical engineering at the Helsinki University of Technology (now part of Aalto University) in 2000, and completed a Ph.D. there in 2005. While doing her doctoral studies, she was a visiting scholar at the Massachusetts Institute of Technology, in its Center for Innovation in Product Development. Her dissertation, Modular Product Platform Design, was supervised by Kalevi "Eetu" Ekman.

She became an assistant professor at the University of Massachusetts Dartmouth in the US, in 2005. She was an associate professor at the Singapore University of Technology and Design and at Aalto University in Finland before taking her present position as Professor of Engineering Design at the University of Melbourne, in its Department of Mechanical Engineering.

At UMass Dartmouth, she was honored in 2012 by the Center for Women, Gender & Sexuality for her support of women students in engineering. At Aalto University, she became chair of the Professors' Council in 2017.

== Recognition ==
Hölttä-Otto was elected as an ASME Fellow in 2023.
