= Jaishankar Raman =

Australian cardiothoracic surgeon

- Born: Johor Bahru, Malaysia
- Education: St John’s Medical College, Bangalore, India; University of Sydney; University of Melbourne
- Occupations: Cardiothoracic surgeon, Researcher, Inventor, Professor
- Known for: Heart failure surgery, mitral valve repair, minimally invasive cardiac procedures

Jaishankar Raman is an Australian cardiothoracic surgeon and academic. He is Professor of Cardiothoracic Surgery at the University of Melbourne, and Clinical Director of Cardiothoracic Surgery at Townsville University Hospital. He has been a Professor at the Grainger School of Engineering, University of lllinois at Urbana-Champaign since 2016. Raman is known for introducing new procedures and techniques in cardiovascular surgery aimed to support the heart and reduce pain from post surgery chest closure. He is known for his work in Multi-modal Spectroscopy in biology, arterial grafting in coronary surgery, heart failure surgery, mitral valve repair, and minimally invasive cardiac procedures.

== Life and career ==
Raman was born in Johor Bahru, Malaysia. He studied at St. Aloysius College in Mangalore in 1979 and earned his MBBS from St. John’s Medical College, Bangalore, in 1984. He trained in microsurgery at Royal Darwin Hospital and completed a Master of Medicine in Surgery at the University of Sydney in 1993. In 1997, he became a Fellow of the Royal Australasian College of Surgeons in Cardiothoracic Surgery. He received a Ph.D. in Surgery from the University of Melbourne in 2003.

From 1997 to 2002, Raman worked at Austin Hospital and the University of Melbourne. In 2002, he joined the University of Chicago as a Professor and Director of Adult Cardiac Surgery. He was Chief of Cardiac Surgery at Rush University Medical Center from 2011 to 2015. Between 2016 and 2019, he was a Professor of Cardiothoracic Surgery at the Knight Cardiovascular Institute at Oregon Health & Science University. Raman returned to Australia in 2019 and was appointed Clinical Director at Townsville University Hospital in 2024. In 2025, he was appointed Professor Director of Surgery at James Cook University, Australia.

In 1997, he developed the concept of ventricular containment, which went to clinical trials as the Acorn Cardiac Support device or CorCap in the treatment of heart failure. In 2012, he co-founded Phoenix Cardiac Devices (previously Mardil inc), which developed extra-cardiac mitral valve repair. He also founded the Spectromix lab in 2021, with an affiliated startup company involved in research on development of multi-modal spectroscopy in the evaluation of biological tissues and bio-fluids.

In 2001, Raman developed the Basal Annuloplasty of the Cardia Externally (BACE) device, a cextra-cardial support system used to reduce functional mitral regurgitation without the need for cardiopulmonary bypass. This went from bench to translational experimentation and finally clinical trials. This device was approved for use by CE mark in 2017

From 2002 onwards, Raman conducted research and developed principles of sternal and rib fixation techniques that have since been incorporated into enhanced recovery protocols after cardiac surgery.

In 2008, Raman introduced the concept of the ambulatory balloon pump support through the subclavian artery for failing hearts, while at the University of Chicago, which helped pave the current use of the subclavian approach of the Impella pumps.

Raman's research has focused on ventricular assist devices and ECMO, including protocols aimed at minimizing anticoagulation and pre-emptive use in cardiac surgery. He has participated in 5 Multi-center International Randomized Controlled Trials and is currently involved in two RCTs in multiple centers around Australia.

Raman has co-authored studies on the use of vibrational spectroscopy techniques to analyze the chemical composition of various biological and human tissues during surgery including - bone, skeletal muscle for sarcopenia, heart tissue for fibrosis, assessment of the liver for transplantation, bladder for cancer, with a growing list of others being investigated. Other research publications include studies on acute kidney injury and neurological effects following cardiac bypass in large animal models which translate into human clinical trials. He has been involved in assessing safety features of new devices such as the Da Vinci Robot and the effect of simulation in ensuring better outcomes with surgery. In the realm of critical care, he has worked with colleagues to assess ICU admission patterns associated with climate phenomena such as El Niño and improve peri-operative care in concert with the late Prof Rinaldo Bellomo in areas such as hemofiltration, mitigation of kidney injury. Prof Raman has published over 340 peer-reviewed articles and holds over 30 patents related to cardiac surgery and medical imaging.

In 2025, the Royal Australasian College of Surgeons honored him with the award of Excellence in Surgery.
