= Peter Connor (footballer) =

English footballer

Personal information
- Place of birth: England
- Position: Centre forward

Senior career*
Years	Team	Apps	(Gls)
1896	Blackpool	4	(1)
- * Club domestic league appearances and goals

Peter Connor was an English professional footballer. A centre forward, his only known club was Blackpool, for whom he made four Football League appearances and scored one goal. The goal came in a 5–0 victory over Burton Wanderers on 19 September 1896.
