= Koitaki =

Village in Papua New Guinea

Koitaki is a village along the Kokoda Track in Papua New Guinea to the east of Port Moresby.
