= Josephine Forbes =

Australian scientist

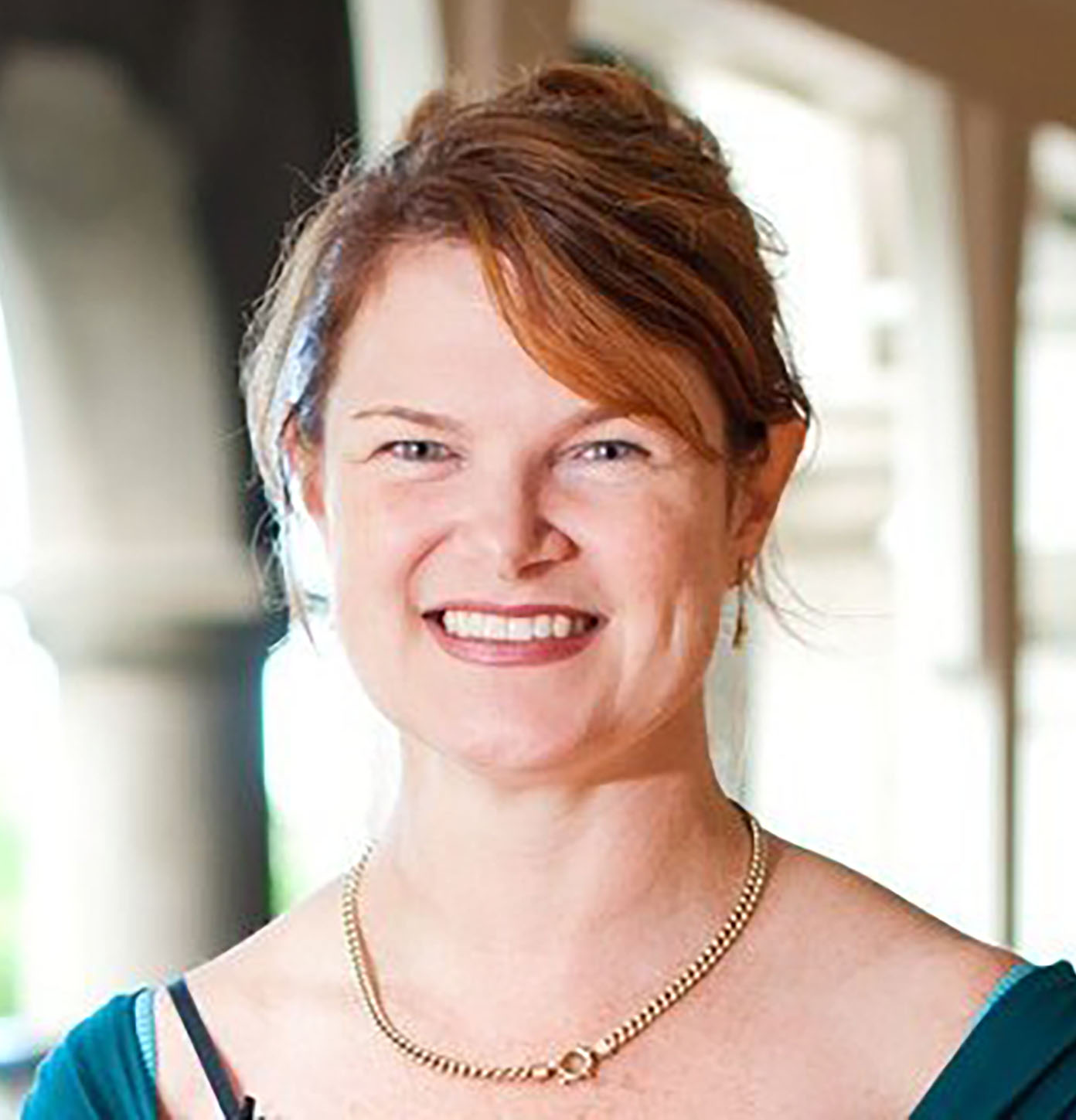
- Education: University of Melbourne
- Awards: Commonwealth Health Minister's Award; Young Tall Poppy Award; NHMRC Achievement Award
- Scientific career
- Fields: Medicine; Diabetes; Nephrology
- Workplaces: Mater Research

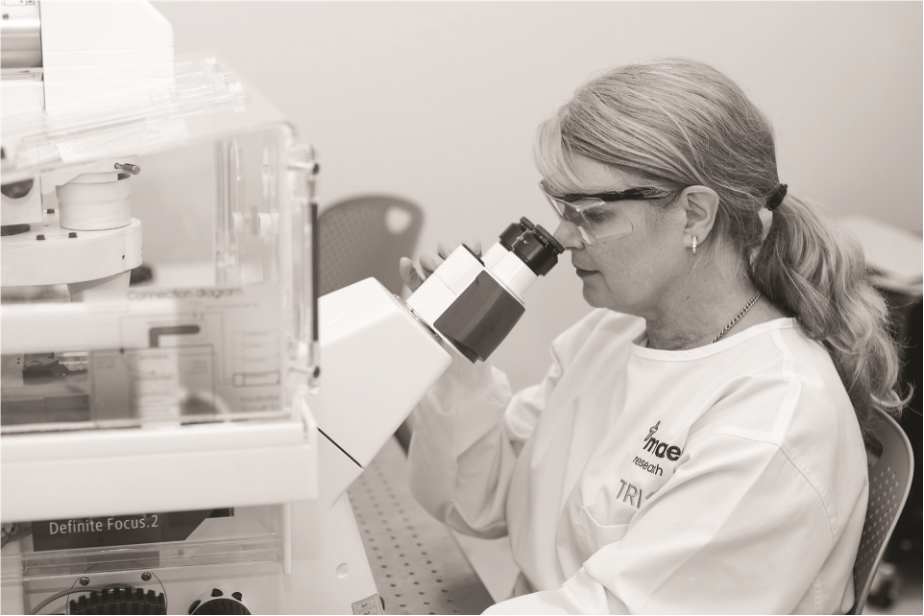

Josephine Forbes (born 20 August 1970) is a Professor of Medicine and an Australian scientist partnering with diabetes stakeholders, clinical services and industry to deliver innovative effective therapeutics to improve the lives of people who are at risk for or are living with diabetes. She trained in the Departments of Medicine and Paediatrics of the University of Melbourne, based at Victorian Paediatric Renal Service, Royal Children's Hospital and Austin Health and later at the Baker Heart and Diabetes Institute. Josephine is currently based at Mater research - The University of Queensland co-located at the Translational Research Institute which is a world-class medical research institute based at South Brisbane, Australia and part of the Mater Group. Josephine is also currently the President of the Australian Diabetes Society, a peak body representing health care professionals in diabetes . Her research encompasses bench to bedside approaches that focus on vulnerable groups who develop diabetes earlier in life better understanding pathogenesis of diabetes and its complications such as kidney disease.

== Biography ==
Professor Forbes currently leads a team of post-doctoral researchers and supervises numerous students, in addition to being a professor of medicine at the University of Queensland and a principal research fellow in the Department of Medicine at the University of Melbourne.

== Education ==
Forbes was awarded her PhD in Nephrology in 1999 from the University of Melbourne, Australia for research carried out at the Royal Children's Hospital and then completed her Post-Doctoral training at Austin Health. She is currently an NHMRC Leadership Fellow and has held research grants from the NH&MRC of Australia, The Medical Research Future Fund (MRFF), Breakthrough T1D (formerly the Juvenile Diabetes Research Foundation -JDRF) and the National Institutes of Health (USA).

== Awards ==
Forbes has received many awards in recognition of her research:

- 2002: Young Researcher Award, International Diabetes Federation
- 2006: Millennium Award for T1 Diabetes, Diabetes Australia Research Trust (DART)
- 2008: Young Tall Poppy Award, Australia Institute of Policy and Science
- 2010: The Commonwealth Health Minister's Award for Excellence in Health and Medical Research
- 2010: NHMRC Achievement Award for highest ranked Career Development Award
- 2014: Women in Technology Life Science Award
- 2016: World Science Festival - Women in STEM Prize; Judges Choice
- 2017: TJ Neale Award for Outstanding Contribution to Nephrological Science, Australian And New Zealand Society of Nephrology
- 2017: Sr Regis Mary Dunne Medal for Outstanding Research Contribution to Mater Group.
- 2021: Sr Michaeleen Ahern Medal for Outstanding Contribution to Post-Graduate Student Supervision, Mater Research Institute-UQ.
- 2021: Women in Technology Prize, Outstanding Contribution to Science.
- 2023: Mater Misericordiae Ltd People Awards, Research Excellence Award.
- 2018-2025: Stanford University’s List of the top 2% scientists in the world (in top 1%; Clarivate).
- 2026: International Women in Leadership in Diabetes (WIELD) – TrailBlazer Award.

== Research ==
Professor Forbes leads internationally recognised programs focused on preventing diabetes and its complications—particularly diabetic kidney disease, a major cause of illness and early death worldwide. Her work spans discovery science through to clinical translation. She and her team investigate how diabetes damages the body at a molecular level—especially the role of metabolism, mitochondria and inflammation—and use these insights to develop new therapies and biomarkers. This research has already contributed to clinical trials and is helping to shape the next generation of treatments aimed at slowing or preventing disease progression.

A strong advocate for earlier intervention, Professor Forbes has been instrumental in demonstrating that complications such as kidney disease can begin much earlier than previously thought, including in young people. This has driven her focus on prevention, precision medicine and improving outcomes across the life course. Professor Forbes is President of the Australian Diabetes Society and plays a key role in shaping national research and health policy convening stakeholders to produce the first National Diabetes Research Strategy. She works closely with clinicians, industry and people living with diabetes to ensure research delivers real-world impact.

Her work to date has resulted in more than 200 publications with more than 19000 citations (Scopus) https://www.scopus.com/authid/detail.uri?authorId=35460743800.

== Fellowships ==
- JDRF Post Doctoral Research Fellowship, 2002-2004
- JDRF Career Development Award, 2005-2009
- NHMRC, RD Wright Career Development Award, 2005-2009
- NHMRC, Career Development Award level 2, 2010
- NHMRC Senior Research Fellowship, 2011-2015
- NHMRC Senior Research Fellowship, 2016-2020
- NHMRC Leadership Award/Fellowship Level 2, 2022-2026
