= Marie Siegling =

American classical composer (1824–1920)

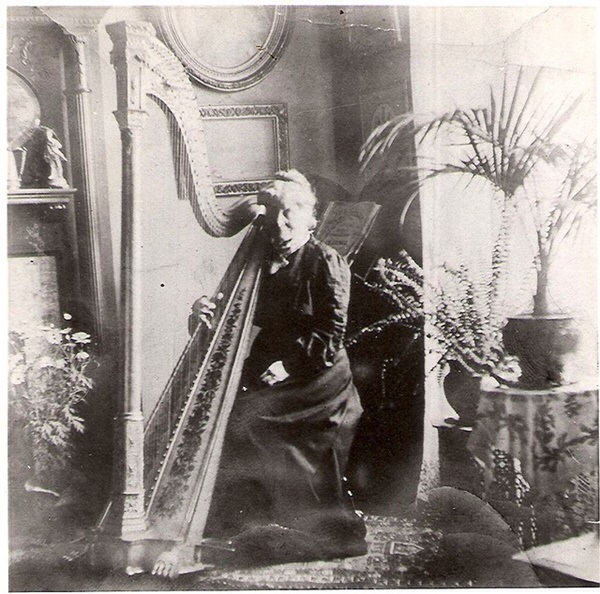

Marie Regina Siegling (February 7, 1824 – January 2, 1920) was an American composer.

== Biography ==
She was born on February 7, 1824, in Charleston, South Carolina, the eldest daughter of Prussian immigrant Johann Zacharias Siegling and his wife Mary Schnierle. Johann Siegling was an instrument maker and music publisher who founded the Siegling Music House in 1819. Her youngest brother was journalist Rudolph Septimus Siegling. Marie Siegling most likely began her musical studies under her mother.

Siegling was later educated in Europe and had a career as a musician and composer. In 1844, she traveled with her father to Havana where he had a music store called Siegling & Vallote. They stayed in Cuba for three months, where she performed as "Charleston's Jenny Lind." Later in the year, Siegling went to Paris to study music. While on tour in Europe, she met literature professor Eduard Schuman LeClercq, whom she married in 1850. Siegling moved with her husband to Paris and ended her performing career. She had five children.

While in Europe, Marie had contact with many of its greatest composers and musicians. She writes in her memoir: "I met many distinguished artists and authors, amongst them Wagner, Schröder-Devrient, Liszt, Schumann. Here also I was present at the first representation of Tannhäuser and Lohengrin, directed by the great Master Richard Wagner, who took the baton." Her own composition, Souvernir de la Saxe, is dedicated to Her Majesty, Marie, Reine de Saxe.

Siegling published a memoir titled Memoirs of a Dowager in 1908 under the name Mary Regina Schuman LeClercq. Papers related to the family are housed at the University of South Carolina.

She died on January 2, 1920, in Nice.

== Works ==
Selected works include:

Literary:

- Memoirs of a Dowager : 20 December 1908 as Mary Regina Schuman Le Clercq.

Musical compositions:

- La capricieuse
- La gracieuse
- Souvenir de Charleston, valse originale
- Souvenir de la Saxe
- Souvenir de la Saxe, valse
- The Recall: Come back oh Come! for voice and piano
