= Peter O'Connor (psychologist) =

Peter A. O’Connor is a retired psychologist who had a private psychotherapy practice in Melbourne, Australia.

O'Connor was born in Melbourne in 1942. A graduate of Melbourne University, he was Director of Counselling at the Marriage Guidance Council of Victoria for seven years. In 1972 he was awarded the Winston Churchill Fellowship and completed a PhD in marriage and family counselling at the University of Southern California. He has held several academic and clinical positions in Australia and overseas. O'Connor has had a longstanding involvement in working therapeutically with men and is a former columnist with the Good Weekend magazine.

O'Connor is the author of a number of books, including Mirror on Marriage (1973), Understanding Jung (1985), Dreams and the Search for Meaning (1986), The Inner Man (1993), Looking Inwards (2003) and Understanding the Mid-Life Crisis (1981) which is his best-known and most influential work.

== Understanding the Mid-Life Crisis ==
Understanding the Mid-Life Crisis is in its eighth printing.

- The mid-life crisis is a stage when many men and women are plagued by feelings that their life has no meaning or that their physical and mental powers are spent.
- This time of apparent crisis can also be seen as a creative challenge, as a stimulus for deeper understanding and growth.
- It can be a time of coming to terms with yourself, understanding more about yourself and a time for taking new directions.

== See also ==
- Mid-life crisis

== Bibliography ==
- O'Connor, P. (1981). Understanding the Mid-Life Crisis, Sun Australia, ISBN 0-7251-0374-4
