= Rudolph Septimus Siegling =

American journalist (1839–1894)

Rudolph Septimus Siegling (3 December 1839 – 13 March 1894) was a Civil War veteran, legislator and prominent lawyer in Charleston, South Carolina. He was in the Confederate Army.

== Life and career ==
German American General Rudolph Siegling was born in Port Royal, Beaufort, South Carolina, the youngest son of Prussian immigrant Johann Zacharias Siegling and his wife Mary Schnierle. His father was an instrument maker and music publisher who founded the Siegling Music House of Charleston in 1819. Siegling married Effie Oswald Campbell in 1884. His oldest sister was composer Marie Siegling.

At the beginning of the American Civil War, a company of German Volunteers was raised for the Confederacy and Siegling became its second lieutenant. The command was attached to the Hampton Legion and was known as Company H, German Volunteers. The Legion was badly in need of artillery, and the commander authorized the conversion of some of its companies into artillery. The Volunteers were selected and thereafter became known as the German Artillery of the Hampton Legion. Siegling was seriously wounded at the Second Battle of Bull Run by an exploding grenade. His death was reported to his family and a funeral service was conducted in Charleston. However, when his father went to retrieve the body, he found his son was alive.

After the war, Siegling became a Brigadier General of the South Carolina Militia, commanding the 4th Brigade. He had a successful career as a lawyer and served terms in South Carolina's legislature. Siegling was also a college trustee, bank president, builder, railroad president and president of Charleston's newspaper, The News & Courier.

Rudolph Siegling died in Charleston and is buried there at Magnolia Cemetery. Papers related to the family are housed at the University of South Carolina.
