= Karl Siegling =

Karl Siegling is the owner and manager of Cadence Asset Management Pty Ltd, a private Australian company that manages funds for Cadence Capital Limited. He holds a Bachelor of Commerce and a law degree from the University of Melbourne as well as an MBA from INSEAD.

== Cadence Asset Management ==
Cadence Asset Management is a private company founded and owned by Karl Siegling. It manages two ASX listed funds:

1. Cadence Capital Limited: a company listed on the Australian Securities Exchange under the code CDM (ASX:CDM);
2. Cadence Opportunities Fund Limited: a company listed on the Australian Securities Exchange under the code CDO (ASX:CDM)
