= Bradd Westmoreland =

Australian painter (born 1975)

Bradd Westmoreland (born 1975) is an Australian painter.

Westmoreland holds a Bachelor of Fine Arts from the Victorian College of the Arts, having completed his degree in 1995. Since holding his first solo exhibition in 1997, Westmoreland has exhibited regularly, developing a distinctive visual style. Imagined landscapes, bright subjects and painterly backgrounds are characteristic of his work. The artist typically uses strong colours to develop form, light and shadow in his paintings.

== Exhibitions ==
Bradd Westmoreland has held over 15 solo exhibitions and has participated in 16 group exhibitions. He is represented by Niagara Galleries in Melbourne and has exhibited extensively at Gallery 9 in Sydney. Recently, Westmoreland’s work was included in the blockbuster exhibition, Melbourne Now.

== Collections ==
Westmoreland’s work is held in public and private collections across Australia and overseas. He is featured in major public galleries including the National Gallery of Victoria and the British Museum, London.
