= Fay Marles =

Australian public servant (1926–2024)

Fay Marles AM
- Born: Fay Surtees Pearce; 3 January 1926; Melbourne, Victoria, Australia
- Died: 1 November 2024 (aged 98); Melbourne, Victoria, Australia
- Education: Ruyton Girls' School
- Alma mater: University of Melbourne
- Occupations: Public servant University chancellor
- Spouse: Donald Marles (m. 1952)
- Children: 4, inc. Richard

Fay Surtees Marles AM (née Pearce; 3 January 1926 – 1 November 2024) was an Australian public servant. She served as Victorian Commissioner of Equal Opportunity from 1977 to 1987 and Chancellor of the University of Melbourne from 2001 to 2004.

== Early life ==
Marles was born Fay Pearce in Melbourne on 3 January 1926. She was the second of three children born to Jane Victoria (née Crisp) and Percy William Pearce; an older sibling died as an infant. Marles' father was a World War I veteran and Military Cross recipient; after returning from the war he ran the Bjelke-Petersen School of Physical Culture in Melbourne.

Marles attended Ruyton Girls' School in Kew. She graduated from the University of Melbourne in 1948 with a Bachelor of Arts and Diploma of Social Work. She subsequently became a social worker in Queensland. However, after her marriage to Donald Marles in 1952 she was subjected to the marriage bar and forced to resign her position.

== Professional career ==
Marles completed a Master of Arts in 1975 as a mature-age student and joined the University of Melbourne's faculty as a senior tutor and later lecturer in social work.

=== Commissioner of Equal Opportunity ===
In 1977, Marles was appointed Victoria's Commissioner of Equal Opportunity, following the passage of the Equal Opportunities Act 1977 by the government of Dick Hamer. She launched an "extensive community awareness campaign on discrimination", including issues like sexual harassment, paternity leave, workplace discrimination against women, and women in the priesthood. In her autobiography she recalled that she had experienced "several death threats and intimidating behaviour during her time as commissioner". In 1978, Marles attracted attention with her intervention on behalf of female pilot Deborah Lawrie in her sex discrimination case against Ansett Australia. Lawrie's case progressed from the Equal Opportunity Board and was eventually appealed by Ansett to the High Court, which ruled in Lawrie's favour.

Marles resigned as Equal Opportunity Commissioner in 1986 and established a consulting firm, Fay Marles & Associates, specialising in equal opportunity and anti-discrimination. She continued to work closely with her replacement as commissioner, Moira Rayner.

=== University of Melbourne ===
Marles was first elected to the University of Melbourne Council in 1984 and became a deputy chancellor in 1986. She served as chancellor from 2001 to 2004, the first woman to hold the position. As chancellor, she was an advocate for increasing the number of Indigenous Australian graduates, working "closely with Indigenous members of the university to establish the Koori Education Centre employing Koori staff and providing a space for Indigenous students to have time on their own without pressure". She also encouraged participation from international alumni and was an advocate for the increased involvement of women in university processes.

== Politics ==
Marles was an unsuccessful candidate at the 1997 Australian Constitutional Convention election, running alongside five candidates (including Eve Mahlab and Kim Rubenstein) under the banner of "The Women's Ticket – An Equal Say". Their group polled 2.4 percent of first-preference votes in Victoria.

== Personal life and death ==
Marles and her husband had four children, including politician Richard Marles. She raised her family in Geelong, where her husband was a housemaster at Geelong Grammar School.

Marles died in Melbourne on 1 November 2024, at the age of 98.

== Honours ==
Marles was made a Member of the Order of Australia in the 1986 Australia Day Honours, for "public service particularly in the field of social welfare". She was also awarded the Centenary Medal in 2001 for "services to Australian society in business leadership and higher education".

Marles was inducted into the Victorian Honour Roll of Women in 2010. After her retirement as chancellor the University of Melbourne established the Fay Marles Scholarship in her honour, awarded to "research students from Australian Indigenous descent or students who are experiencing compassionate or compelling circumstances". The Victorian Women's Benevolent Trust established the Fay Marles Equal Opportunity Sub-Fund in 2013.

Academic offices
Preceded by Sir Edward Woodward	Chancellor of the University of Melbourne; 2001–2004	Succeeded by Ian Renard
