= Philip Rhoden =

Philip Edington Rhoden
- Born: 23 December 1914; Essendon, Victoria
- Died: 13 March 2003 (aged 88)
- Military career
- Allegiance: Australia
- Branch: Citizens Military Force; Second Australian Imperial Force
- Service years: 1933–1951
- Rank: Lieutenant Colonel
- Commands: 2/14th Battalion (1943–45)
- Conflicts: Second World War; Syria–Lebanon Campaign; New Guinea campaign; Kokoda Track campaign; Finisterre Range campaign; Battle of Balikpapan
- Awards: Officer of the Order of the British Empire; Mentioned in Despatches (2); Efficiency Decoration

Lieutenant Colonel Philip Edington Rhoden OBE, ED (23 December 1914 – 13 March 2003) was an Australian Army officer in the Second World War and a lawyer. He was commanding officer of the 2/14th Battalion, Second Australian Imperial Force (AIF) from 21 November 1943 to 8 November 1945. While commanding the battalion, it participated in operations in the Ramu Valley and the Finisterre Mountains, until returning to Australia on 8 March 1944. Its last actions were at Balikpapan, from 1 July 1945 – remaining as an occupation force after the cessation of hostilities.

Educated at Melbourne Grammar and the University of Melbourne, Rhoden was a solicitor by trade. He was admitted to the Victorian Bar in 1939, and worked for John P Rhoden Solicitors.
