= Alex Dekker =

Australian humanitarian

- Dekker speaking at the 2026 Feast To Feed gala
- Born: March 31, 2000 (age 26); Melbourne
- Occupations: Humanitarian and entrepreneur
- Organization: Alex Makes Meals
- Website: adekker.com

Alex Dekker is a humanitarian worker and founder of the Australian food charity Alex Makes Meals.

In 2020, during the peak of the COVID-19 pandemic, Dekker started the food charity inspired by helping his sister, a doctor. The demand for meals quickly outgrew the capacity of the then 19-year-old university student, so he gathered a team of volunteers and founded the charity Alex Makes Meals. The charity expanded its attentions to include homeless people and other support groups.

Dekker initially left his university course to run the charity at the peak of 2020, although he has since finished studies at the University of Melbourne in the Bachelor Of Commerce.

Year	Award	Category	Result
2020	Melbourne Awards	Community Champion (COVID-19 response)	Finalist
2022	Victorian Young Australian of the Year	—	Nominated
2022	Premier's Sustainability Award	Community Champion, Healthy and Fair Society	Won
2023	Banksia Foundation National Sustainability Awards	Young Changemaker	Won
2024	Forbes 30 Under 30 Asia	Social Impact	Listed
2024	Melbourne Awards	Young Melburnian of the Year	Won
2025	Herald Sun Future Victoria	25 Under 25	Listed
2025	Forbes 30 Under 30 Australia	Social Impact	Listed
2026	University of Melbourne Alumni of Distinction Awards	Rising Star for Young Alumni	Won
2026	Cambridge Judge Business School	Cambridge MBA Scholarship for Professional Impact	Awarded
