= Parbury =

Parbury is a surname. Notable people with the surname include:

- Florence Tyzack Parbury (1881–1960), British socialite and musician
- George Parbury (1807–1881), British publisher
- Kathleen Parbury (1901–1986), British sculptor
- Nancy Parbury (1885–1959), Australian golfer

== See also ==
- Carbury, surname
- Marbury (surname)
- Parbery, surname
