= 1986 Australia Day Honours =

Annual Australian award, 1986 edition

The 1986 Australia Day Honours were announced on 26 January 1986 by the Governor General of Australia, Sir Ninian Stephen.

The Australia Day Honours are the first of the two major annual honours lists, announced on Australia Day (26 January), with the other being the Queen's Birthday Honours which are announced on the second Monday in June.

== Order of Australia ==
=== Companion of the Order of Australia (AC) ===
Recipient	Citation	Notes
Sir Bernard James Callinan CBE DSO MC	For service to the Public Service and the community	
Dr Victor Peter Chang	For service to international relations between Australia and China and to medical science	
The Honourable Sir John Cochrane Moore	For service to industrial relations	
Dr John Paul Wild CBE	For service to science and to the Commonwealth Scientific and Industrial Research Organisation	
Sir Geoffrey John Yeend CBE	For public service, particularly as secretary to the Department of the Prime Minister and Cabinet and as secretary to Cabinet	

=== Officer of the Order of Australia (AO) ===
==== General Division ====
Recipient	Citation	Notes
Dr Graham Irving Alexander	For service to agriculture, particularly in the field of animal protection	
Professor Donald Thomas Anderson	For service to the education, particularly in the field of biology	
Emeritus Professor Peter Orlebar Bishop	For service to medical science, particularly in the field of physiology	
Bevan Preston Bradbury	For service to the community and the retail industry	
Professor Maxwell Howard Brennan	For service to science and technology	
Commissioner Eva Evelyn Burrows	For service to the temporal and spiritual welfare of the community and to social justice as the world leader of the Salvation Army	
Professor David Edmund Caro OBE	For service to learning	
The Hon Francis Xavier Lockington Connor	For service to the law	
Richard Kevan Gosper	For service to sport and sports administration	
The Honourable Sir Asher Alexander Joel KBE	For service to the community.	
Kevin James Kirby	For service to secondary industry, and to the community	
John Archibald Landels	For service to Australian industry through the development of a competitive national electricity market, as chairman of the National Grid Management Council	
Hugh Mitchell McKenzie	For service to the pastoral industry	
Emeritus Professor Reginald John Moir	For service to agriculture through teaching and research	
Dr Jack Philip Morris	For service to the community, particularly as Director of the Victorian Red Cross Blood Bank	
Peter Lawrence Quirk Norris OBE	For service to the community, particularly through the Institute of Sisters of Mercy of Australia	
Norman Oakes	For public service, particularly as secretary and comptroller of accounts of the New South Wales Treasury	
James Anthony Albert Rickard	For service to the community, particularly as foundation national director and chairman of the Tasmanian Advance Australia Committee	
David Iser Smith CVO	For service to the Crown, as Official Secretary to the Governor-General and as Secretary of the Order of Australia	
Douglas Arthur Swan	For service to education, particularly as Director-General of Education in New South Wales	
Paul Murray Trainor	For service to secondary industry, particularly in the field of medical technology	
Margaret Valadian	For service to the community, particularly in the field of Aboriginal education and culture.	
Peter Frederick Williams	For service to medicine, particularly in the fields of children's orthopaedic surgery and surgical training programmes	
Joseph Ian Norman Winter	For service to the community, and to industry and commerce	
The Honourable John David Wright	For service to politics, industrial relations and the community	

==== Military Division ====
Branch	Recipient	Citation	Notes
Navy	Rear Admiral William James Crossley AM	For service to the Royal Australian Navy, particularly as Chief of Naval Personnel	
Navy	Rear Admiral Peter Ross Sinclair	For service to the Royal Australian Navy, particularly as the First Commandant of the Australian Defence Force Academy	
Army	Major General Derek Christopher John Deighton MBE	For service to the Australian Army in the field of logistic development	
Army	Major General Lawrence George O'Donnell	For service to the Australian Army as Chief of the General Staff	
Air Force	Air Vice Marshal Peter John Scully	For service to the Royal Australian Air Force as Air Officer Commanding Support Command	

=== Member of the Order of Australia (AM) ===
==== General Division ====
Recipient	Citation	Notes
Peter Darrel Agars	For service to the Accountancy profession	
Dr John Ronald Allen	For service to the sugar industry, particularly with the Sugar Research Institute	
Graham Richard Andrew	For service to the public service, particularly as Chief Administrative Officer of the Albury-Wodonga Development Corporation	
Keith Arthur Bagley	For service to the community	
James Keith Bain	For service to commerce, particularly with the Sydney Stock Exchange	
Harold Noel Balcomb	For service to the community and primary industry	
Thomas Noel Barton	For service to the honey industry	
Alan Francis Batley	For service to the accountancy profession	
Joseph Anthony Battanta	For service to the Public Service	
Dr Isabel Joy Bear	For service to science, particularly in the field of mine chemistry	
Jack Wilson Bennett	For service to primary industry	
Charles Josef Berg OBE	For service to the arts, particularly as Chairman of the Australian Opera	
Douglas Maurice Blake	For service to the Commonwealth parliament	
Margaret Cooper Booth	For service to nursing	
The Hon David Ernest Buffett	For service to the community of Norfolk Island, particularly as Chief Minister	
Dr Richard James Campbell	For service to education	
Professor John Henry Carver	For service to science, particularly in the field of physics	
Dr Kenneth Chan	For service to public service, particularly as Administrator of Cocos (Keeling) Islands	
Judith Ann Clingan	For service to young people in the field of music	
Richard Conolly	For service to local government and public service	
Professor Joseph Frederick Correy	For service to medicine, particularly in the field of obstetrics and gynaecology	
Dr Alex Baillie Costin	For service to conservation	
Professor Roger David Covell	For service to music	
Dr James Meyrick Croker	For service to the dental profession	
Claire Dan	For service to the performing arts	
The Most Reverend Bishop Francis Peter de Campo	For service to the community and religion	
Dr Sydenham Dobbin	For service to the community, particularly in the field of dental health	
Nance Clare Donkin	For service to the community, particularly in the fields of children's literature and adult education	
Dr Max Warwick Dunstone	For service to medicine	
Dr Patricia May Edgar	For service to the media, particularly in the field of children's television	
Sister Mary Bernice Elphick OBE	For service to hospital administration and to nursing	
John Graham Evans	For service to maritime industry	
Dr David Geoffrey Failes	For service to medicine, particularly in the field of surgery	
John Stuart Gaden	For service to the performing arts	
Alexander McLaren Gall	For service to the building industry	
Samuel Hubert Statham Gill	For service to the community, particularly with the Royal Perth Hospital.	
Dr John Sylvester Gladstones	For service to primary industry, particularly in the field of agriculture.	
Bruce Raymond Goddard	For service to industry, particularly in the field of electronic engineering.	
Dr Robert Charles Godfrey	For service to medicine particularly in the field of paediatrics.	
Dr Hugh McLeod Gordon	For service to veterinary science	
Dr Michael Miles Gore	For service to scientific education	
Dr Wallace Gladstone Grigor	For service to medicine, particularly in the field of paediatrics	
Nicholas Paul Hasluck	For service to literature	
Dr John Francis Hennessey	For service to medicine, particularly in the field of infertility	
Dorothy Coade Hewett	For service to literature.	
Paul Hogan	For service to tourism and entertainment.	
Dr Margaret Cooper Holmes	For service to medical research.	
Maxwell Arthur Howell	For service to education.	
Leslie Gordon Stuart Hyland	For service to industry, particularly public transport.	
Dr Germaine Anne Joplin	For service to science, particularly in the field of geology.	
Paul David Kahl MBE	For service to primary industry.	
Bruno Krumins	For service to ethnic affairs and to the Latvian community in Australia	
Donald James Lithgow	For service to scouting	
Mathew James Kane Lodge	For service to industry, particularly to the oil and gas industries	
John Michael Lovett	For service to those with impaired hearing	
The Reverend Doctor The Honourable Malcolm George Mackay	For service to the community, particularly in the fields of religion, education and politics	
Grahame Edgar Mapp	For service to the coal industry and to the community	
Fay Surtees Marles	For public service, particularly in the field of social welfare	
Patrick Daniel McArdle	For public service, particularly with the Australian Taxation Office	
Verne McLaren	For service in conservation	
Paul Francis McNamee	For service to tennis and to the Victorian Tennis Foundation	
Ian Alexander Meldrum	For service to the fostering of international relief and to youth	
Eric Thomas Millar	For public service, particularly with the Victoria Police Force	
Dr Eric William Mills	For service to education	
Jeanette McDonald Moss	For service to the welfare of those with disabilities	
Dr Margaret Mulvey	For service to medicine, particularly in the field of obstetrics and gynaecology, and to the community	
Carmel Josephine Niland	For service to the community, particularly in the field of women's affairs	
Susan O'Reilly	For service to international relations between Australia and the Republic of Ireland	
Robert John Butler Pearson	For service to the metallurgy industry and to the community	
Dr Albert James Penberthy	For service to music	
William Graeme Philp	For service to the accountancy profession	
Harold Victor Quinton CMG OBE	For service to industry, particularly in the field of commerce, and to the community	
Dr Bryce Crossley Rankine	For service to wine industry technology and to education	
Wallace Redvers Read	For service to science, particularly in the field of solar energy	
Nancy Winifred Rehfeldt	For service to welfare, particularly in relation to women and children	
Cyril Robert Richarde	For service to the community, particularly in the field of development aid to Indonesia	
Alec Robinson	For public service, particularly with the Metropolitan Passenger Transport Trust, Perth	
Desmond Glyn Ross	For service to local government	
Mervyn Ernest Sedunary	For public service, particularly with the Department of Lands, South Australia	
Leonard George Shillam	For service to sculpture	
Kathleen Joyce Shillam	For service to the arts, particularly in the field of sculpture, and to education	
Andrew Gerard Slack	For service to Rugby Union football	
James Graham Somerville	For service to conservation	
Dorothy Christine Somerville	For service to the legal profession and to the community	
Clement Stuart Spencer	For public service to the community	
Ronald Grant Stewart	For service to the community, particularly with the Salvation Army	
Leon George Stubbings OAM	For service to the community, particularly with the Australian Red Cross Society	
Daniel Robert Rhys Thomas	For service to arts administration	
Brian Reginald Tobin	For service to tennis, particularly in the field of administration	
John Herbert Todd	For service to Australian football	
Joseph Charles Trethowan	For public service, particularly with the State Electricity Commission of Victoria	
Roy Frederick Turner	For service to the community	
Murray Davey Tyrrell	For service to the wine industry and to tourism	
Reginald Bladen Walker	For service to local government and to primary industry	
Dr Agnes Grace Warren	For service to medicine and to international relations, particularly in the field of leprosy care and treatment	
The Reverend Canon Allan Victor Whitham	For service to religion and social welfare	
Dr Alan Ralph Wannop Wilson	For public service, particularly with the Australian Atomic Energy Commission	

==== Military Division ====
Branch	Recipient	Citation	Notes
Navy	Captain Peter Douglas Briggs	For service to the Royal Australian Navy as the Director, Submarine Warfare Systems Centre, HMAS Watson	
Navy	Commodore Peter Harrington James	For service to the Royal Australian Navy, particularly as the Director-General Service Conditions in the Department of Defence.	
Navy	Commander Michael Charles Webster	For service as the officer in charge during the salvage of HMAS WOLLONGONG at Gabo Island	
Navy	Captain Graham Douglas White	For service to the Royal Australian Navy, particularly as the New Construction Submarine Project Director.	
Army	Major Matthew John Chambers	For service as Operations Officer, 3rd Battalion, the Royal Australian Regiment, particularly in the field of parachute capability development	
Army	Lieutenant Colonel John Patrick Dwyer	For service to the Australian Army in the field of command and instructional training	
Army	Major Peter Finch	For service to the Australian Army in the field of computer management	
Army	Lieutenant Colonel Lawrence Bernard Kelly RFD ED	For service as Commanding Officer, 2nd Battalion, the Royal New South Wales Regiment.	
Army	Brigadier Gordon James Murphy	For service as Australian Defence and Army Attaché to Indonesia	
Army	Colonel Leslie Orme Peters	For service to officer management with the Office of the Military Secretary	
Army	Colonel Patrick Theophilus Henry Thorne	For service as Commanding Officer, Corps of Staff Cadets, Royal Military College, Duntroon	
Army	Major Valma Doreen Wals	For service to the Royal Australian Army Nursing Corps, particularly as Staff Officer Nursing, Headquarters 3rd Military District	
Air Force	Wing Commander Robert Charles Bennett	For service to the Royal Australian Air Force as Chief Engineer for the F111C Pave Tack, Guided Weapons Programme	
Air Force	Group Captain Kevin John Bricknell	For service to the Royal Australian Air Force as a staff officer within the Directorate of Training – Air Force	
Air Force	Squadron Leader Peter Anthony Kelley	For service to the Royal Australian Air Force as Commanding Officer, RAAF School of Photography.	
Air Force	Wing Commander Peter John McDermott	For service to the Royal Australian Air Force as Navigator Training Flight Commander with No. 292 Squadron	
Air Force	Wing Commander Allan William Titheridge	For service to the Royal Australian Air Force as Commanding Officer, No. 77 Squadron, RAAF Williamtown	
Air Force	Wing Commander Noel Kenneth Wainwright	For service to the Royal Australian Air Force as the Resident Manager in France for the AS350B Squirrel Helicopter Project	

=== Medal of the Order of Australia (OAM) ===
==== General Division ====
Recipient	Citation	Notes
Marin Martin Alagich BEM	For services to the Yugoslav community in Australia	
Jessie Elizabeth Mary Ayres	For service to the community.	
Antonio Bamonte	For service to the Italian community	
Noel James Banks	For service to the sport of greyhound racing	
Lily Barboutis	For service to the people with impaired hearing	
James Aloysius Barlow	For service to the community	
Charles Howard Beanland	For service to technical education	
Thomas Joseph Bellew	For service to the sport of Rugby League and for public service	
Jean Gertrude Anne Bibby	For service to the sport of lawn bowls	
Maria Aurelai Boffa	For service to the Office of the Italian Consul-General and to the Italian community	
Margaret Ruth Bolton	For service to nursing, particularly to the Daw Park Repatriation Hospital	
Magda Bozic	For service to the community	
William Campbell Broad	For service to the community and local government	
Allan Robert Bull	For service to local government and the community.	
Janet Bull	For service to the welfare of those with intellectual disabilities	
Iris Buntine BEM	For service to the community	
William Eddie Munro Burnett	For service to the welfare of ex-service personnel	
William Frederick Busch	For service to the welfare of ex-service personnel and to the community	
Mervyn Bancroft Butterfield	For service to the sport of surf lifesaving	
Margaret Cahill	For service to women's amateur athletics	
Ethel Teresa Hephzibah Callaghan	For service to the community	
Alma Henry Calvert	For service to the community	
Oswald Matthew Campbell	For service to the community, particularly with the St Vincent de Paul Society	
Frank Pearson Campbell	For service to the community	
Edwin Arthur Frederick Thomas Carnall	For service to public service, particularly with the Commonwealth Passenger Transport Service	
Colin James Christie	For service to the community	
Canon Thomas Russell Hope Clark	For service to the community and religion	
Heather Clark	For service to community welfare organisations	
Henry Michael Clarke	For service to the trade union movement	
Ella Mary Josephine Clifton	For service to the community	
Aleksander Cmielewski	For service to the Polish Community and to sport	
Agathocles Agathocleous Constantine	For service to the sport of soccer and to the community	
Evelyn Alice Coverley	For service to the community, particularly as a fund raiser for charitable organisations	
Harry Mercer Curby	For service to music and music education	
William Ralph Davison ED	For service to the welfare of ex-service personnel	
Sydney Lance Dawkins	For service to animal husbandry	
Dr Andrew Steven Dezsery	For service to ethnic publishing and welfare	
Councillor Kevin Arthur Dowling	For service to the community and local government	
Elma Jean Dressing	For service to the community	
Arnold Joseph Drury	For service to the community	
Ian Craig Dunlop	For service to the public, particularly in the field of ethnographic film making	
Douglas Avon Dunstan	For service to the community	
John Raymond Dyer	For service to the community and local government	
Arthur Edward Earle	For service to the community	
Edith Evelyn Ellis	For service to the community, particularly with the Country Women's Association	
June Sadie Epstein	For service to the arts and to the welfare of people with disabilities	
The Reverend Keith Robertson Ewin	For service to religion and to the community	
Joan Evelyn Fielding	For service to secretarial education	
Judith Osborne Finlason	For service to the community, particularly with the Community Activities Centres Network	
Isabel Ann Flick	For service to the Aboriginal community	
Dr Harold William Arthur Forbes ED	For service to the medicine, particularly in the field of child welfare	
Trudy Franzen	For service to the welfare and education of children with severe learning difficulties	
James Fryer	For service to the trade union movement	
Henry Gordon Gallagher	For service to the sport of swimming	
Beverley June Gledhill	For service to the community, particularly in promoting Australian inventions.	
Ronald William Gleeson	For service to the community and to Christian education.	
William Harry Green	For service to the community	
Harold James Gregg	For service to the recreational welfare of prisoners	
Mary Patricia Guy	For service to the community, particularly to charitable organisations in Australia and overseas	
Margaret Elizabeth Hall	For service to the community.	
Audrey May Hardman	For service to the community	
Matthew Harris BEM	For service to the community	
John Dennis Harrison	For service to the sport of Australian football	
Thomas Hart	For service to the welfare of ex-service personnel	
The Reverend Canon Dr David Harvey Sutton MBE ED	For service to the community	
Reginald Geoffrey Helyar	For public service and for service to the community	
Ronald Keith Henderson	For service to the community, particularly with the St John Ambulance Association.	
Malcolm Sidney Herbert	For service to the sport of rifle shooting.	
Anne Bower Ingram	For services to children's literature.	
Bernard Jacks	For service to the Life Insurance Industry.	
Rodney Johnson	For service to the sport of amateur pistol shooting.	
Leo John Keegan	For service to the community.	
Patricia Ann Keillor	For service to pre-school education.	
Harold Leon Kellaway	For service to ballet.	
Eva Valma Kennedy	For service to Aboriginal welfare.	
Grant Hayden Kenny	For services to the sports of surf lifesaving and canoeing.	
Sister Mary Gregory Kerr	For service to the teaching of music.	
Donald James Kerr	For service to the community.	
Kenneth Lionel Kiesling	For service to the community and to local government.	
Shelagh Margaret King	For service to pony clubs.	
Charles Anthony Lacaze	For service to the sport of junior Rugby Union football.	
Alan Leslie Lane	For service to the community and to local government.	
Francis Victor Lind	For service to junior Rugby League football.	
Henry Thomas Lowry	For service to music	
Bernard Charles Lye	For service to local government	
Cosimo Alberto Claudio Mariani	For service to the Italian community, particularly in the field of sport	
Alice Mavis Martin	For service to the sport of netball	
Cyril James McGorey	For public service	
Robert Stanley McGrath	For service to the community	
Paul Terence McNally	For service to libraries, particularly in the field of audio-visual aids	
John Stanley Raymond Meredith	For service to Australia folklore and music.	
John William Merkus	For service to the community and local government	
Walter Hillary Miller	For service to the sport of Australian football	
Ivan Noel Molloy	For service to the welfare of those with impaired vision	
Peter Guy Montgomery	For service to the sport of water polo	
Dr Richard John Mulhearn	For service to medicine	
Anthony William Mundine	For service to sport, particularly to boxing and to Aboriginal youth	
Una Josephine Norburn	For service to the community	
Charles Edmund Gendecourt Nott	For service to the community and to local government	
Jack Griffith Odewahn	For service to the sport of lawn bowls	
Grace Mary Parbery	For service to the community	
Leonard William Parish	For public service	
George Errington Parlby	For service to the sport of rowing	
Keith William Pearson	For service to the community and to local government.	
Ronald Mark Penn	For service to the community	
Evelyn Winifred Powell	For service to the welfare of children with physical disabilities	
George Harrison Pratt	For service to the community	
Archibald Herbert Price	For service to the sport of hockey	
Frances Mary Pulsford	For service to the community and to the Young Women's Christian Association	
Joyce Ivy Radbourne	For service to the outback community of Western Australia	
Robert Warren Regnis	For service to engineering	
Phillip Edward Rice	For service to lifesaving	
Dulcie Michel Richards	For service to the Australian dairy goat industry	
Ivy May Richards	For service to speech education	
George Wilfred Richardson	For service to the Australian stockhorse breeding industry and to the community	
Guiseppe Rinaudo	For service to the Italian community in Queensland	
Agnes Isabel Robertson	For service to the community	
Joan Mary Therese Russell	For public service	
Francis Joseph Rutyna	For service to the Polish community in Queensland	
Margaret Ryan	For public service	
Luigi Sasso	For service to the community and to orchid growing	
David Schier	For service to the sport of rowing	
Sister Mary Raphael Shoveller	For service to education	
Phyllis Leeton Simpkins	For service to the community	
Albert Glen Smith	For service to the Museum of Australia and to the community	
Leonard Norman Sommerfeld	For service to the welfare of ex-service personnel.	
William John Sorraghan	For service to the community and to local government	
Margaret Gordon Spratt	For service to the community	
Sadie Ursula Stevens	For service to the community	
Twink Edwina Story	For service to the community	
Sister Mary Placid Tait	For service to education	
Rabbi Uri Themal	For service to multicultural education and radio broadcasting	
Margaret Isobel Toogood	For service to the welfare of ex-service personnel	
Valerie Hazel Torning	For service to the community	
Dr My-Van Tran	For service to Asian-Australian relations	
Ignatius Stephen Travers	For service to the community	
Errol Clifford Truss	For service to agriculture	
Thelma Rosalind Vollprecht	For service to the community and to nursing	
Margaret Mary Wait	For service to the community and to nursing	
John William Miles Walmsley	For service to the community and to local government	
Mervyn Arthur Warrick	For service to the community	
Barry John Weir	For service to arts administration	
Timothy Henry West	For service to the community	
Lawrence Herbert Wharmby	For service to the sport of table tennis and to the community	
Phyllis Dorothy Wild	For service to the community in the field of public libraries	
Keith Desmond Wilson	For service to the community and to local government	
Ella May Wood	For service to the Australian Red Cross Society	
William Treloar Woodhead	For service to podiatry.	
Alfred Bryan Woore	For service to the community	

==== Military Division ====
Branch	Recipient	Citation	Notes
Navy	Warrant Officer Ronald James Bateman	For service to the RAN Submarine arm as Establishment Maintenance Officer, HMAS Platypus	
Navy	Warrant Officer Kenneth Rodney Ferguson	For service to the RAN as the Barrackmaster and Base Engineer Officer at HMAS Nirimba	
Navy	Chief Petty Officer William Harold Houssenloge	For service to the development of Mulloka sonar system.	
Navy	Warrant Officer John Kindness	For service in the Reserve Pay Group, Brisbane Port Division, Royal Australian Naval Reserve.	
Navy	Chief Petty Officer Thomas John Meany	For service as the Chief Steward on the personal staff of the Flag Officer Naval Support Command.	
Army	Staff Sergeant Gordon William Duggan	For service as CQMS in the 9th Battalion, the Royal QLD Regiment.	
Army	Warrant Officer Class I John Henry Dunshea	For service as RSM of 2nd/4th Battalion, Royal Australian Regiment.	
Army	Warrant Officer Class I Arthur Murphy Francis	For service as Regimental Sergeant Major of 3rd Battalion the Royal Australian Regiment	
Army	Warrant Officer Class I Ronald John Fuller	For service to Unit Logistic Administration	
Army	Warrant Officer Class I Cheryl Nancy Jones	For service as a supervisor, communications with 4th Signal Regiment.	
Army	Warrant Officer Class I Henry Alfred King	For service as Quartermaster, 1st Aviation Regiment.	
Army	Staff Sergeant Philip Anthony Kirkman	For service to the Australian Intelligence Corps.	
Army	Warrant Officer Class I Maurice McGuire	For service to the Army Reserve in Queensland, in particular to 5th 11th Field Regiment.	
Army	Warrant Officer Class II Graham John Newboult	For service to the Army in the field of control and supply of parachute equipment.	
Army	Warrant Officer Class I Graham Edward O'Toole	For service to the Royal Regiment of Australian Artillery, in particular as the Master Gunner at the Directorate of Artillery, Army Office.	
Army	Warrant Officer Class I Peter James Charles Prewett	For service as the Master Gunner in the Field Force Artillery	
Army	Warrant Officer Class I Kenneth Edward Rundell	For service as an Instructor in Support Weapons Wing, Infantry Centre, particularly in the development of weapon doctrine.	
Army	Warrant Officer Class I Ronald Sydney Ryan	For service as Warehouse Supervisor, 21st Supply Battalion	
Army	Warrant Officer Class I Gary John Sutherland	For service as Regimental Sergeant Major, Army Office	
Air Force	Flight Sergeant Arthur Harold Cleary	For service to the RAAF as a Radio Technician with No 2 Control and Reporting Unit	
Air Force	Warrant Officer Noel Desmond Darr	For service to the RAAF as Loadmaster Leader with No 37 Squadron	
Air Force	Warrant Officer Ian Ross Davies	For service to RAAF as a Laboratory Technician at No 3 RAAF Hospital	
Air Force	Warrant Officer Robert Milne Eley	For service to the RAAF as a Warrant Officer Engineer with No 5 Squadron	
Air Force	Flight Sergeant Kenneth John Leslie	For service to the RAAF as a Signals Operator with the Defence Signals Directorate in Melbourne.	
Air Force	Warrant Officer James Lyons	For service to the RAAF as a Senior Clerk Supply with Base Squadron RAAF Richmond.	
Air Force	Warrant Officer Robert John Charles Ridges	For service to the RAAF as a Radio Technician Ground with the Air Transportable Telecommunications Unit.	
