= Parbery =

Parbery is a surname. Notable people with the surname include:

- Brett Parbery (born 1971), Australian equestrian
- Grace Parbery (1913–1993), Australian social worker

== See also ==
- Clem Parberry (1911–1976), American athletic coach and administrator
- Parberry Block East, historic building
- Parberya, genus of fungi
- Parbury, surname
