= Tyzack =

Tyzack is a surname. Notable people with the surname include:

- Florence Tyzack Parbury (1881–1960), English socialite
- Margaret Tyzack (1931–2011), English actress
- Michael Tyzack (1933–2007), English painter
