= David Edmund Caro =

Australian physicist (1922–2011)

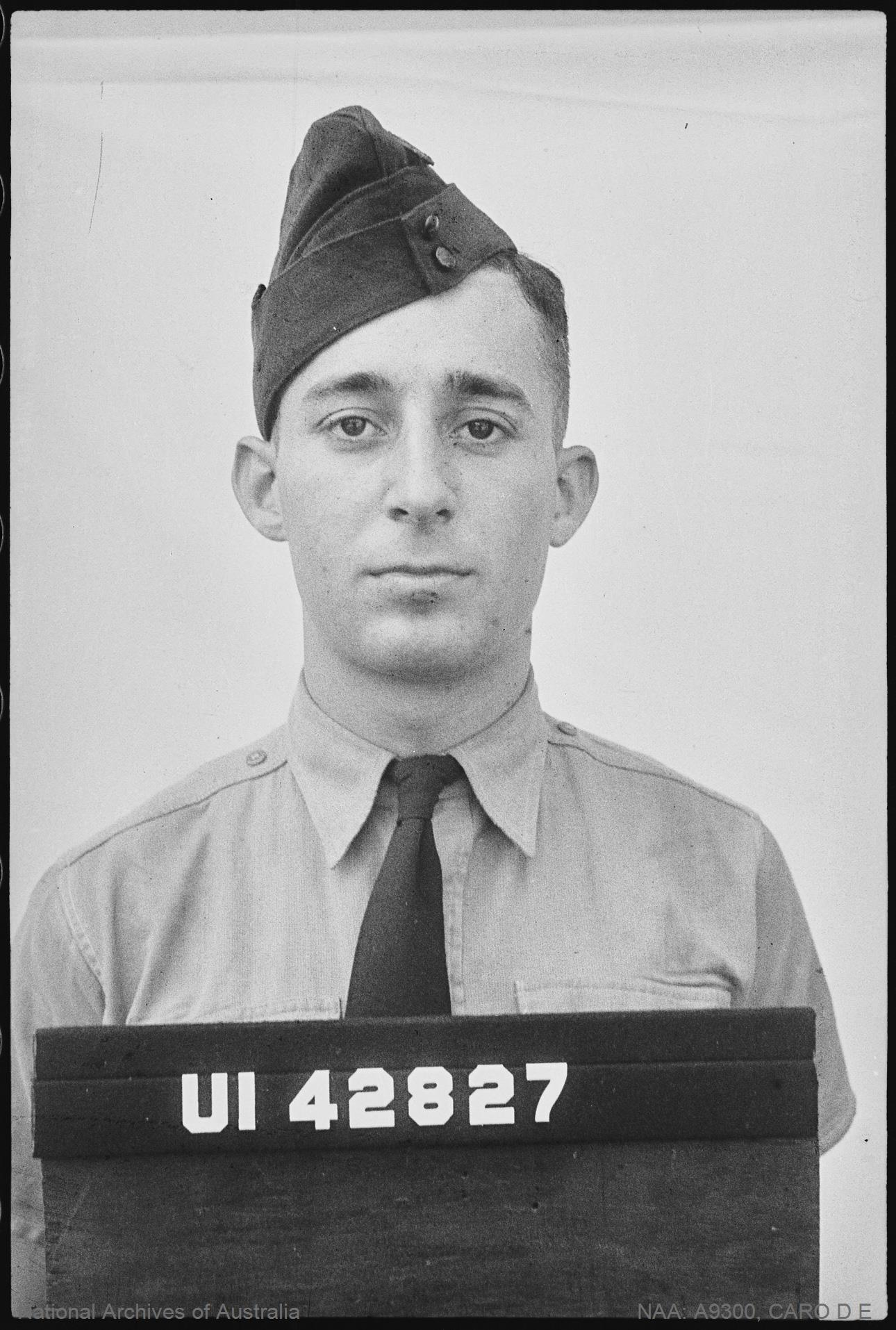
- 1941 Royal Australian Air Force ID photo
- Born: 29 June 1922; St Kilda, Victoria, Australia
- Died: 15 August 2011 (aged 89); Melbourne, Victoria, Australia
- Education: University of Melbourne; University of Birmingham
- Scientific career
- Thesis: Some aspects of the radio frequency system of the Birmingham proton synchroton (1951)
- Doctoral advisor: Mark Oliphant
- Military career
- Branch: Royal Australian Air Force
- Service years: 1941–1946
- Rank: Flight lieutenant
- Service number: 254725

David Edmund Caro (29 June 1922 – 15 August 2011) was Australian physicist who was vice-chancellor of the University of Ballarat, the University of Melbourne and the University of Tasmania, interim vice-chancellor of the Northern Territory University, and chancellor of the University of Ballarat. He was instrumental in creating UniSuper, the superannuation scheme of university employees. He supported Antarctic research and travelled to Antarctica twice, paying a brief visit to the South Pole.

After service in the Royal Australian Air Force (RAAF) during World War II, during which he maintained radar systems, he graduated from the University of Melbourne with a Bachelor of Science degree in 1946 and a Master of Science degree in 1949. He then went to the University of Birmingham in England, where he assisted the expatriate Australian professor of physics, Mark Oliphant, in the construction of the Birmingham proton synchrotron, which formed the basis of his 1951 Doctor of Philosophy thesis. He returned to the University of Melbourne, where he became head of the physics department in 1961 and deputy vice chancellor in 1972. Caro was vice-Chancellor of the University of Tasmania from 1978 to 1982, and of the University of Melbourne from 1982 to 1987.

== Early life and education ==
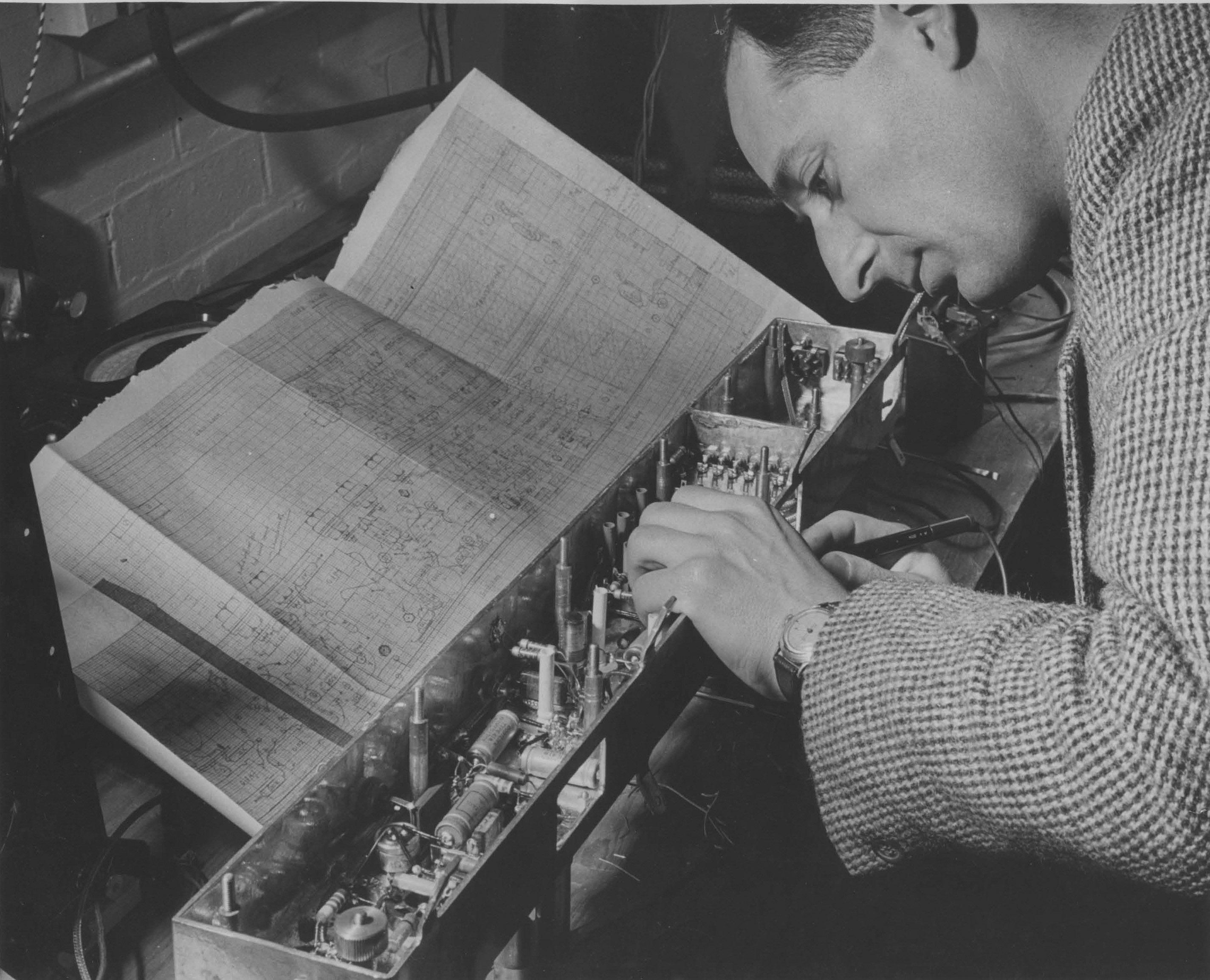
Completing the wiring of the second variable oscillator unit of the Birmingham proton synchrotron in 1950, with his plan drawings in front of him.

David Edmund Caro was born in St Kilda, Victoria, on 29 June 1922, the only son of George Alfred and Alice Lilian Caro. He was educated at Geelong Grammar School and entered the University of Melbourne in 1940, intending to pursue a degree in science. His studies were interrupted by World War II, and he enlisted in the Royal Australian Air Force (RAAF) on 20 September 1941. Like many recruits who knew some physics, he was sent to study radar systems. He was commissioned as a pilot officer on 9 March 1942, and was subsequently promoted to flying officer on 6 September 1942 and flight lieutenant on 1 December 1943. He served in the Northern Territory with No. 44 Radar Wing and at Port Moresby in Papua, where he maintained radars in support of Nos 6, 7 and 100 Squadrons.

After the war ended, Caro's RAAF appointment was terminated on 17 January 1946, and he returned to his studies at the University of Melbourne, graduating with his Bachelor of Science degree in 1946. He them embarked on a Master of Science degree under the tutelage of Philip Law, who later became the director of the Australian National Antarctic Research Expeditions from 1949 to 1966. Caro used his electronic skills to build a spectrometer for measuring the cosmic rays in Antarctica, field-testing it on Mount Hotham. He was awarded his Master of Science in 1949, and was awarded an 1851 Research Fellowship to study in the UK. He went to the University of Birmingham, where he assisted the expatriate Australian professor of physics, Mark Oliphant, in the construction of the Birmingham proton synchrotron. He wrote his 1951 Doctor of Philosophy thesis on "Some aspects of the radio frequency system of the Birmingham proton synchroton".

== University of Melbourne ==
Caro returned to the University of Melbourne, where he was appointed a lecturer in 1952, senior lecturer in 1954 and reader in 1958. On 27 February 1954, he married Fiona MacLeod, the younger daughter of Lieutenant Colonel T. B. Macleod, of Richmond, Tasmania, in a ceremony at St David's Cathedral in Hobart officiated by Percy Fewtrell, the Dean of Hobart. They had two children, Richard and Catriona. With research student John Rouse, Caro built a variable-energy cyclotron at the University of Melbourne, the first of its kind. He commenced the design in June 1953 and construction began in 1954. The machine provided generations of research students with experience in nuclear physics but Caro made little use of it himself; for him the challenge was in building the machine rather than in using it for experiments.

Appointed professor of experimental physics and head of the physics department in 1961, Caro overhauled the physics curriculum. Construction of a new physics building was initiated. Opened in 1974, it now bears Caro's name. The physics department's high energy research group conducted experiments at the Brookhaven National Laboratory in the United States that generated hundreds of thousands of bubble chamber images. Seeking a way to automate their processing, Caro learned to program computers. After he became deputy vice chancellor in 1972, he computerised the university's administrative systems. He also overhauled the distribution of funds, replacing the old arbitrary mechanisms with a more transparent procedure.

== University of Tasmania ==
In 1978, Caro became the vice-chancellor of the University of Tasmania in Hobart. In this capacity he had to navigate the merger of the university with the Tasmanian College of Advanced Education in Launceston. As deputy vice chancellor at the University of Melbourne he had been concerned at the lack of an adequate staff superannuation scheme, which he considered an obstacle to good staff relations, and had established a scheme based on both employer and employee contributions. As vice-chancellor of the University of Tasmania he pushed for the creation of a national scheme along these lines. This was established in 1982. The University of Tasmania was the first institution to join the new scheme, and Caro served as the chairman of UniSuper from 1983 to 1993. By 1995, the scheme held $3 billion in investments.

Another of Caro's interests was Antarctic research. He became the chairman of Antarctic Research Policy Advisory Committee in 1979 and oversaw Australia's current Antarctic program. The committee promoted greater involvement in Antarctic research. A series of research grants was established. Annual flights between Australia and its bases in the Antarctic were instituted and the icebreaker RSV Aurora Australis was acquired in 1989. Caro twice travelled to the Antarctic and even paid a brief visit to the South Pole.

== Vice-chancellor ==
Caro returned to the University of Melbourne in 1982, this time as vice-chancellor. He was known for his support of centralized services such as the Computer Centre and the University Library, which was boosted with additional acquisitions and funding. He retired in 1987 but the following year he oversaw the merger of the Darwin Institute of Technology with the University College of the Northern Territory to form the University of the Northern Territory, which later became Charles Darwin University. Caro briefly served as interim vice-chancellor of the new university until a permanent vice-chancellor could be appointed. He also served on the council of the newly-formed University of South Australia and University of Ballarat, as a director of the Melbourne Business School, and as president of the Victorian College of the Arts. He was chancellor of the University of Ballarat from 1995 to 2008.

The University of Melbourne awarded Caro an honorary Doctor of Laws degree in 1978 and a Doctor of Science degree in 1987. The University of Tasmania also awarded him an honorary Doctor of Laws degree in 1982. He was appointed an Officer of the Order of the British Empire in the 1977 New Year Honours and an Officer of the Order of Australia in the 1986 Australia Day Honours.

Caro died in Melbourne on 15 August 2011. A funeral service was held at Saint John's Anglican Church in Toorak and his remains were cremated. His papers are held by the University of Melbourne.
