= My-Van Tran =

Vietnamese Australian academic

My-Van Tran AM (Vietnamese: Trần Mỹ Vân) (8 August 1947 - ) is a Vietnamese-Australian author, academic and community worker. She became and Australian citizen after the Fall of Saigon meant that she was not able to return to Vietnam while she was completing her PhD at the Australian National University.

In Australia she was an academic, lecturing in history and, in the 1970s helped many Vietnamese refugees arriving in Australia via Darwin but acting as a translator for them and assisting them in settling there; this was often at great personal expense.

== Early life and education ==
Tran was born in South Vietnam and she is the daughter of Tran Van Huc, who was a school director, and Nguyen Thi Marie. She was a bright student and, after completing her schooling, she attended Saigon University where she completed the equivalent of a bachelor of arts. Following this, with the help of a Fulbright Award, she completed a master of arts (history) from Duke University and then a diploma in teaching English as a second language at the University of Papua New Guinea.

In around 1975 Tran began studying towards a doctor of philosophy in Asian Civilizations at the Australian National University. During her studies the Fall of Saigon took place and she was unable to return to her home, so, in 1976 she applied to become an Australian citizen.

== Life in the Northern Territory ==
In late 1977 Tran moved to Darwin where she began lecturing in history at the Darwin Community College where she taught about American and Southeast Asian history until 1988. While in this role she played a major part in the development of their bachelor of arts course and also developed a series of short courses and public lectures directed at public servants.

During the period surrounding her arrival in Darwin there were also many Vietnamese 'boat people' arriving there and Tran assisted the Department of Immigration interviewing new arrivals and interpreting for them. In doing this Tran assisted countless refugees and, additionally, would assist them in relation to their social needs as well and this was often at her personal expense and despite bureaucratic obstacles. She did this following the arrival of 32 boats.

Also in Darwin, in 1978 she married Frederick Douglas Robins, a British economist and they later had one son Douglas Tran Robins.

== Life in South Australia ==
In 1988 Tran and her family relocated to Adelaide where she taught at Flinders University the University of South Australia where she was an associate professor. While there Tran was also appointed to several government advisory bodies including the South Australian Multicultural and Ethnic Affairs Commission and the National Multicultural Advisory Council.

== Publications ==
She has authored several books concerning Vietnamese history, including:

- The Long Journey, Australia's First Boat People (1980).
- A report on the settlement of Indo-Chinese refugees in Darwin, the Northern Territory (1980).
- A Vietnamese Scholar in Anguish: Nguyen Khuan and the decline of the Confucian order, 1884-1909 (1992).
- A Vietnamese Royal Exile in Japan: Prince Cuong De (1882–1951) (2005).

== Awards and honours ==
In the 1986 Australia Day Honours Tran was awarded the Medal of the Order of Australia for "service to Asian-Australian relations" and in 2002 she was appointed a Member of the Order of Australia for "service to the Vietnamese community, and to the promotion of multiculturalism and Asian studies".
