= June Epstein =

Australian author, musician, and educator (1918–2004)

- Born: June Sadie Epstein; 29 June 1918; Perth, Western Australia, Australia
- Died: July 9, 2004 (aged 86); Melbourne, Victoria, Australia
- Other names: June Guest
- Occupation(s): Author, musician, educator
- Employer: Australian Broadcasting Corporation
- Known for: Disability rights activism
- Awards: Medal of the Order of Australia of the General Division (1986)

June Sadie Epstein (29 June 1918, Perth, Western Australia – 9 July 2004, Melbourne, Victoria) was an Australian author, musician, and educator. She is considered to be one of the most influential Australian children's writers of the 1950s.

== Personal life ==
Epstein was born on 29 June 1918 in Perth, Western Australia.

She had three children with her husband Julius Guest, whom she married in 1949. Two of her children died at a young age due to encephalitis and a brain tumor. These experiences fueled her advocacy for the rights of disabled people.

Epstein died on 9 July 2004, in Melbourne at 86 years old.

== Career ==
In 1935, June Epstein received the first edition of a three-year music scholarship from the Trinity College of Music in London (now the Trinity Laban Conservatoire of Music and Dance), where she graduated with a Teacher's Diploma, and a second University of London scholarship towards a bachelor's degree in music. The beginning of World War II in 1940 cut this short and Epstein began working with the Australian Broadcasting Corporation (ABC) back in Australia. She was a broadcaster, composer, pianist, recitalist, and scriptwriter, and worked with the ABC for several decades after.

Shortly afterwards, in 1942, Epstein began teaching music at the Frensham School in Mittagong, New South Wales, before becoming the Director of Music at the Melbourne Girls Grammar School. She was also involved in composing and teaching children's music with the Melbourne College of Advanced Education, Institute of Early Childhood Development until 1976.

Epstein began publishing her work in 1951 and would go on to create over fifty plays, scripts, short stories, books, and songs.

In 1988, she published her autobiography, Woman with two hats: an autobiography. Most of her work focused on the experiences of people with disabilities and she endeavored to raise awareness for the needs of that community.

== Works (selected) ==
=== Books and short stories ===
- The story of the bionic ear (1989)
- Woman with two hats: an autobiography (1988)
- The Friends of Burramys (1981, Melbourne: Oxford University Press)
- Boy on Sticks (1979, Melbourne, Spina Bifida Association)

=== Radio plays ===
- A Dog's Life (radio drama) (1951)

== Awards and nominations ==
1986: Medal of the Order of Australia in the General Division for "service to the arts and to the welfare of people with disabilities"

1981: The Friends of Burramys – Nominated for the Best Children's Book, Whitley Awards

== Legacy ==
The National Library of Australia's Manuscript Collection hosts a collection of Epstein's work and correspondence, called the Papers of June Epstein 1935–1999, which she herself had donated up until 1999. They also hold a collection of biographical cuttings from newspapers about her life as an author.
