= George Parbury =

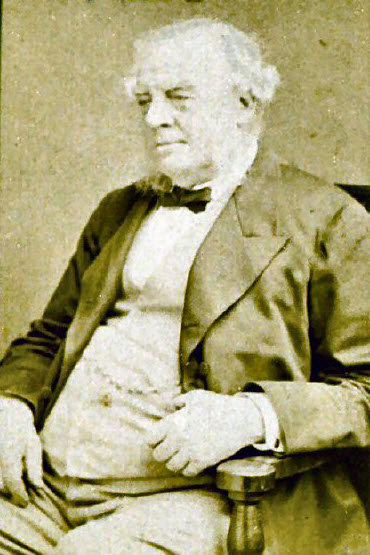
George Parbury (1801-1877), publisher, freemason and Master of Merchant Taylors' Company

George Parbury (1807–1881) was a British publisher with a special interest in India, a freemason in India and London, Master of Merchant Taylors livery company, Justice of the Peace for two counties and Deputy Lieutenant of the Tower Hamlets.

== Biography ==
George Parbury was born 24 January 1807, and baptised on 18 February at St. Leonard's, Shoreditch. He was the second child and eldest son of Hannah Warne and Charles Parbury, the “head of the firm of Parbury, Allen, and Co., the eminent booksellers connected with India”.

George was apprenticed to his father in March 1823. In December 1826 he was granted permission to travel to India and reside in Bengal; the surety of £500 was provided by “Charles Parbury and William H Allen, booksellers of Leadenhall Street”. George arrived in Calcutta on the steamship Enterprise in 1828.

Parbury had been sent by his father to work with William Thacker's bookselling firm in Calcutta. Thacker (1791–1872) had received a licence from the East India Company, allowing him to reside at Fort William “to dispose of Messrs. Black Parbury and Co.’s consignment”, presumably shipped from England, thus marking the beginning of Thacker's company in Calcutta, and was later made a partner of W. Thacker and Co., St. Andrew's Library, Calcutta. There were also family connections between Thacker and Parbury: William Thacker's third marriage, at St Pancras church on 29 December 1841, was to Helen Parbury, George's youngest sister.

Soon after he arrived in Calcutta George Parbury became a freemason: in August 1830 he was initiated in the Aurora Lodge of Candour and Cordiality No. 816, Calcutta. Later, after his return to England in 1832, Parbury joined Moira Lodge No. 109 (now No. 92) in London, and became Master of the Lodge in 1838.

In England George met, or was re-acquainted with, 22 year old Mary Ann Joanna Ellis of Hertford, and married her in St Andrew's church there on 21 May 1833. In April 1834 their first child, George Edward Ellis, was born; the infant survived only four months, and was buried in the same church.

Parbury gained Freedom of the City of London on 3 September 1835, followed three months later by Livery status in the Merchant Taylors’ Company. George and Mary's second child, also George, was born in July 1836, and a third (Emily) was born the following year.

Eighteen months later, in May 1839, he sailed from Portsmouth on the Owen Glendower, arriving in Calcutta on 20 August. George remained there for some eight months, and then returned to England, this time overland to Bombay and then by ship. Early on 13 August 1840 Parbury departed by river from Calcutta on a steam vessel to Allahabad, which was as far as it could go at the time. He then travelled overland, via Agra, Delhi, Bahr and Simla, eventually reaching Bombay at the end of November, 109 days after setting out. On the first of December he was on the steamer Cleopatra, en route to Aden and Suez. After travelling overland and reaching Cairo on 21 December, he sailed from Alexandria on “the splendid steamer, Great Liverpool”, which set off on the 24th, travelling via Malta, Gibraltar, Falmouth and the Isle of Wight quarantine station. Parbury set foot on land on 16 January 1841, six and a half weeks after leaving Bombay, and just over 5 months from Calcutta.

Soon afterwards Parbury published a description of his travels. The first edition, published anonymously, was dated London, 20 June 1841. A year later, a second edition was published under the name of George Parbury, Esq., MRAS. Parbury's book – a copy of which he had lodged in the Royal Asiatic Society library – was soon given a warm review in The Asiatic Journal

J. H. Stocqueler had also written a Handbook of India based on his various experiences as a traveller and his residence in India for some twenty years. When he finally left India he sailed in distinguished company from Calcutta to Suez on the Hindostan, and thence overland to take a ship from Alexandria; his account appeared from the same publisher in 1844. Parbury's colleagues, W Thacker and Co., chose to attack Stocqueler's work in 1845, but without informing him first. They accused Stocqueler of not having acknowledged his "obligation to Mr Parbury’s 'Hand Book of India and Egypt' " when presenting his own book. Stocqueler's rejoinder was published as a letter to The Madras Athenaeum, stating in part:

Has it ever occurred to him that in sending people to buy his personal narrative, facetiously dubbed a "Hand Book of India and Egypt," I should be guilty of leading people to purchase a volume which treats of the merest fraction of India in the most superficial style, and was found so ridiculously insufficient as a guide to Overland Travellers that none of the passengers by the Hindostan in 1843 (I speak of them as I was one of them, though doubtless others have been in the same predicament) could gather from its pages the slightest information that was of any use to them. I declare most solemnly that my Hand Book was solely undertaken and put forth because Mr Parbury's was so wretchedly imperfect, and for no other reason.

Soon after the birth of his fourth and last child by Mary (Edward Fraser, in March 1843) George sailed again to India. He returned from Calcutta on the recently launched steamship Bentinck, departing in March 1844. In October of the following year, Mary died of consumption at Mansfield House, 37 Russell Square, aged 34. In 1849 Parbury was married again, this time to Lucy Wilson Key, the fourth child of John Key, later Sir John Key, first baronet, Lord Mayor of London and Master of the Stationers' Company. Lucy, who was 15 years Parbury's junior and only 10 years older than his first wife, provided George with five more children: three sons and two daughters, born variously in Germany, Calcutta and England. One of his grandchildren was Florence Tyzack Parbury.

Parbury turned his attention to Merchant Taylors again. In July 1855 he was appointed a Warden and a member of the Court of Assistants, involving him more in the management of the guild. He was appointed Master of Merchant Taylors in 1866 and, in that capacity, he hosted the following year's annual banquet in Merchant Taylors’ Hall. Well over a hundred of the great and the good attended, including 20 MPs, the Presidents of learned institutions, members of the clergy, senior military figures and eminent members of the aristocracy, including the Marquis of Salisbury, the Earl of Sandwich and Viscount Stratford de Redcliffe. His Excellency the United States Minister (Charles Francis Adams, Sr., son of President John Quincy Adams) was a prominent guest, whose health was toasted, along with others, at the end of the evening. The principal speaker was the Chancellor of the Exchequer (Benjamin Disraeli).

Parbury was appointed Deputy Lieutenant of the Tower Hamlets on 4 September 1858., and was a Justice of the Peace for the counties of Surrey and Middlesex. He died on 27 January 1881 at the family home: Thornbury House, Caterham in Surrey, and was buried in the family vault at Kensal Green Cemetery.

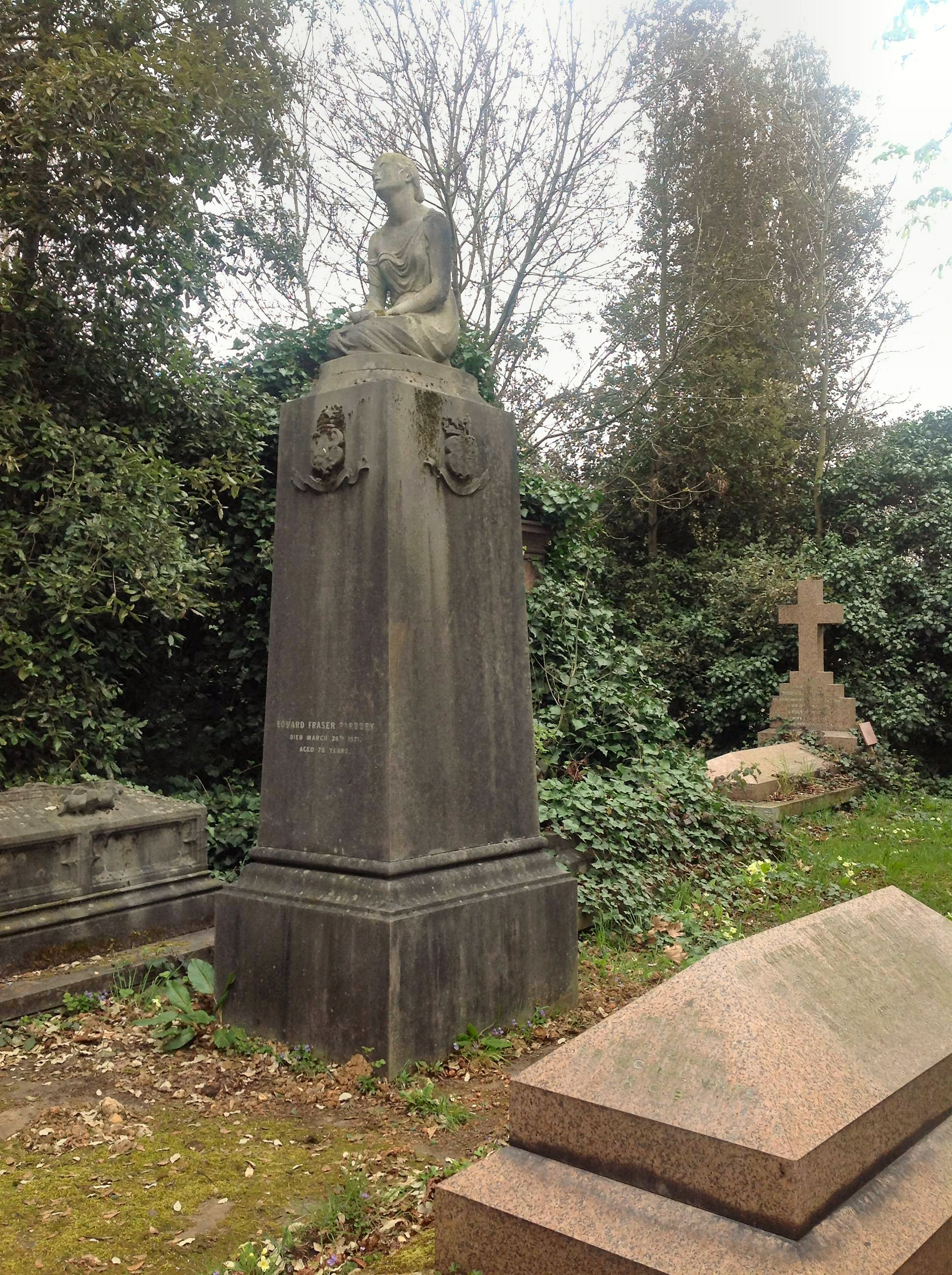
The Parbury family vault, Kensal Green Cemetery

== See also ==
- Thacker, Spink & Company
