= Margaret Valadian =

Aboriginal Australian educator (born 1936)

Margaret Valadian AO MBE (3 September 1936 – 23 December 2023) was an Aboriginal Australian educator and advocate for Indigenous rights, through improved access to education.

== Career ==
Valadian was born in Darwin, Northern Territory on 3 September 1936. Following employment as a welfare worker in the Northern Territory she moved to Brisbane where she was the first Aboriginal graduate of an Australian university when she received her Bachelor of Social Studies from the University of Queensland in 1966. She graduated from the University of Hawaiʻi at the East–West Center with a Master of Education in 1969 and then from Stony Brook University of the State University of New York with a Master of Social Welfare in 1973.

While an undergraduate, Valadian spoke of the financial obstacles facing Aboriginal students wishing to attend university at the 1963 conference of the National Union of Australian University Students.

In 1978 Valadian founded the Aboriginal Training and Cultural Institute in Sydney and acted as co-director with Natasha McNamara from its inception until 1990. Professor Charles Rowley, who had conducted a national survey of Aborigines in NSW in 1980, said of their work:

I learned more about education and the possibilities of new methods from this experience than I have from any single remembered experience of education, and have what I hope is the humility here to salute the genius of two Aboriginal women.

Under the auspices of the Australian Institute of Aboriginal Studies, Valadian gave the 1980 Wentworth lecture, "Aboriginal Education: For Aborigines, By Aborigines?"

Valadian was a member of the Council of the Sydney College of the Arts from 1984 to 1988. She was appointed a member of the NSW Equal Opportunity Tribunal in 1984 and re-appointed for a second three-year term in 1987.

In 1991 Valadian was invited to give the sixth Frank Archibald Memorial Lecture at the University of New England, the title of her speech being "Aboriginal Education—Development or Destruction. The Issues and Challenges that have to be Recognised".

Valadian died on 23 December 2023.

== Honours and recognition ==
In the 1976 Queen's Birthday Honours Valadian was appointed Member of the Order of the British Empire for service to Aboriginal welfare. She was promoted to Officer of the Order of Australia in the 1986 Australia Day Honours for "service to the community, particularly in the field of Aboriginal education and culture". She was awarded the Centenary Medal in 2001.

Valadian won a BHP award for the pursuit of excellence in 1984, receiving AU$40,000 for her community service and welfare work.

In 1995 Valadian was awarded an honorary Doctor of Letters by Macquarie University. She was named University of Queensland Alumnus of the Year in 1996.

In 2023, shortly after Valadian's death, University of Queensland awarded her an Honorary Doctorate.

In 2025, Queensland University's official sculptor, Rhyl Hinwood carved a grotesque of Valadian, now mounted on the walls of the university's Great Court.
