= SS Hindostan (1842) =

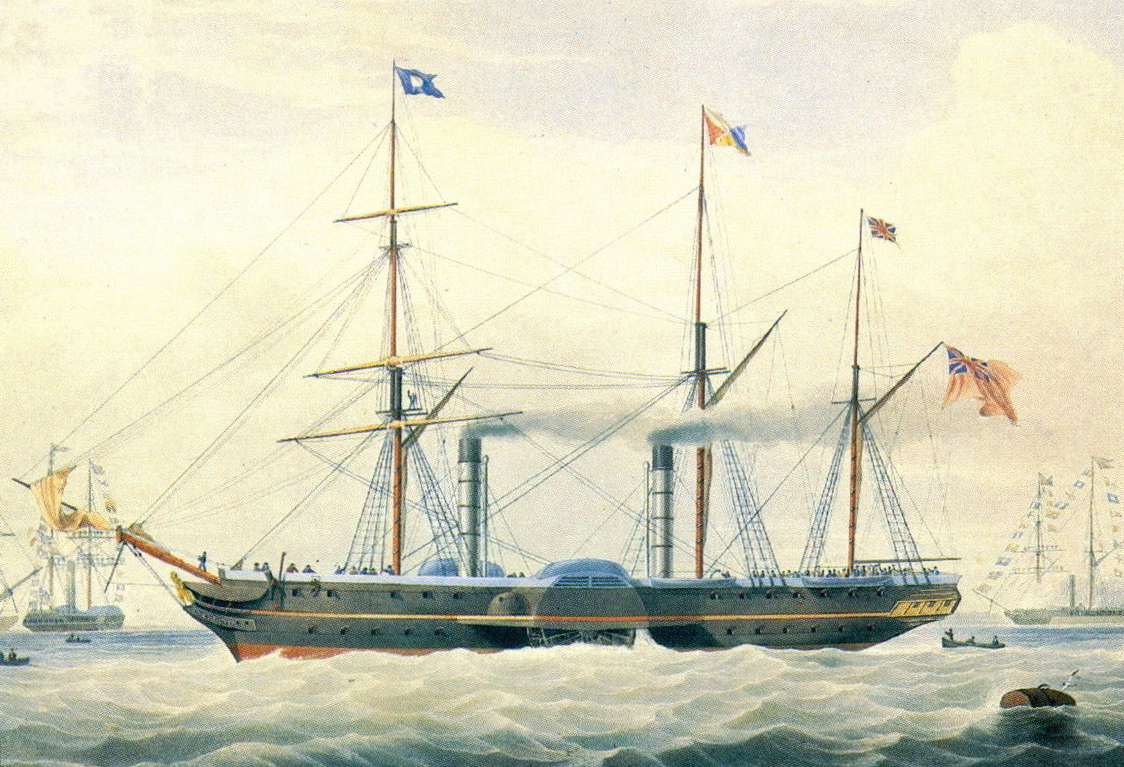
SS Hindostan

SS Hindostan (1842) was a paddle steamer run by the Peninsular and Oriental Steam Navigation Company (P&O) sailing between Southampton and Calcutta. It sank near Calcutta during a cyclone in 1864.

This was the first steam auxiliary ship to run between the Suez Canal and Calcutta; the East India Company entered a contract with the P&O company mainly for carrying mail. Hindostan had three masts for sails and paddles run by 520 horsepower engines, and was capable of carrying 2017 tons. Despatched in September 1842, it plied between Suez and Calcutta with stopovers at Colombo and Madras.
