= Peter Orlebar Bishop =

Australian neurophysiologist (2017–2012)

Peter Orlebar Bishop AO FAA FRS
- Born: 14 June 1917
- Died: 3 June 2012 (aged 94)
- Known for: study of the mammalian visual system
- Scientific career
- Fields: neurophysiology

Peter Bishop (14 June 1917 — 3 June 2012) was an Australian neurophysiologist whose research involved study of the mammalian visual system. His experimental work used single-unit recordings from neurons in the lateral geniculate nucleus and visual cortex of cats and other mammals to analyse how visual information about position, movement and binocular disparity is represented in the brain.

He was elected a Fellow of the Australian Academy of Science in 1967 and Fellow of the Royal Society in 1977. He was appointed an Officer of the Order of Australia in 1985 in recognition of his contribution to physiology.
