= Grace Parbery =

Australian social worker

Grace Mary Parbery OAM (23 September 1913 – 15 March 1993) was an Australian social worker who mainly operated in New South Wales.

== Early life ==
She attended Sydney Girls High School in 1928 and lived in Marrickville. She studied to become an almoner (medical social worker) at the University of Sydney (Cert.Soc.Stud., 1939) while working at the Rachel Forster Hospital for Women and Children, located in Redfern. Parbery worked for the Australian Red Cross Society during World War II gaining experience in mental health care. She later worked as an almoner at the Royal Newcastle Hospital (RNH).

== Career ==
She wrote an article titled "The Almoner Department in the Royal Newcastle Hospital" in the Australian Journal of Social Work in the year 1950 that detailed the work of an almoner in all areas of medicine, as well as in the community. Parbery worked with geriatrician Richard Gibson in the Hunter Region during the 1950s, specialising in the care of people with multiple sclerosis and the aged with a disability. They produced a report on domiciliary, nursing, and medical care, which was supported by the Christian McCaffrey (RNH) medical superintendent and the hospital board. A model developed by Parbery and Gibson saw aged patients receive care and rehabilitation in their own homes, known as the domiciliary care service and retraining unit. Parbery's social work was crucial in establishing this innovative geriatric service (also known as the ‘Newcastle Experience’), an approach to domiciliary care that influenced practices in Australia and around the world. She was a senior medical social worker at the RNH from 1969 until her retirement in 1973.

== Later life ==
In the 1986 Australia Day Honours Parbery was awarded the Medal of the Order of Australia (OAM). She died on 15 March 1993 at New Lambton Heights.

In 1994 the Grace Parbery award was initiated by the Hunter branch of the Australian Association of Social Workers in her memory.
