= Florence Tyzack Parbury =

British socialite and author

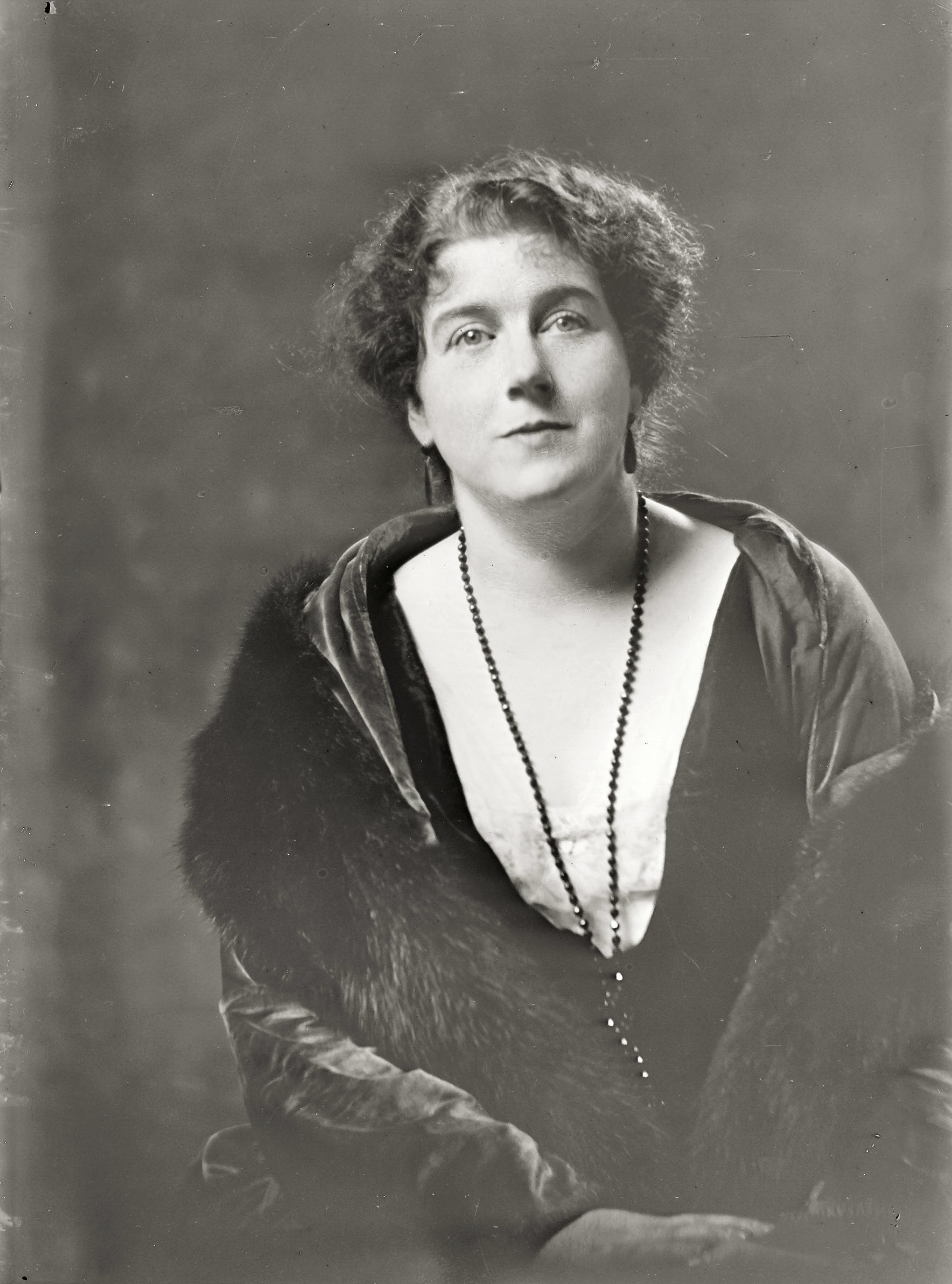
- Florence Tyzack Parbury, photographed by Arnold Genthe in 1919
- Born: 26 September 1881; South Norwood, Croydon, England
- Died: 24 October 1960 (aged 79); London, England
- Other name: Florence Bigland
- Occupations: Socialite author musician painter traveler
- Known for: Work with aviation

Florence Tyzack Parbury (1881–1960) was a British socialite, author, musician, painter and traveller. She was involved in aviation in the United Kingdom and the United States in the 1910s and 1920s.

== Early life ==
Florence Tyzack Parbury was born in South Norwood, Croydon, Surrey on 26 September 1881, the fourth child and only daughter of Douglas Stewart Parbury and Lucy Jane Tyzack. She was baptised at Saint Luke's Woodside, Croydon on 2 July 1882. Parbury, the granddaughter of George Parbury, spent the first few years of her life in Surrey.

Her parents then separated, and by the time Parbury was seven she and her mother had moved to Ecclesall Bierlow, Sheffield to live with Lucy's recently widowed mother, Jane Tyzack.

== Musical training and performances ==
Parbury performed in public from an early age: in December 1889, aged eight, she was on stage to raise funds for the Children's Hospital in Sheffield. Her musical training began in Sheffield was with the renowned teacher Marie Foxon. She was later then in Italy; in London with Dr. Lierhammer; and with Jean de Reszke in Paris. She learned to play several instruments including pianoforte, organ, violin, and harp, and also composed music.

When performing for troops in World War I, Parbury "[brought] down the house with her imitations of farmyard fowls, peacocks, doves, and cats", and could imitate well-known singers, male and female. In a more formal setting she was admired by many for her soprano voice of unusual compass, but at the Queen's Hall in London in 1922, Parbury's programme of operatic excerpts and drawing-room "trifles" did not impress a music critic from The Times.

== Early involvement in flying ==
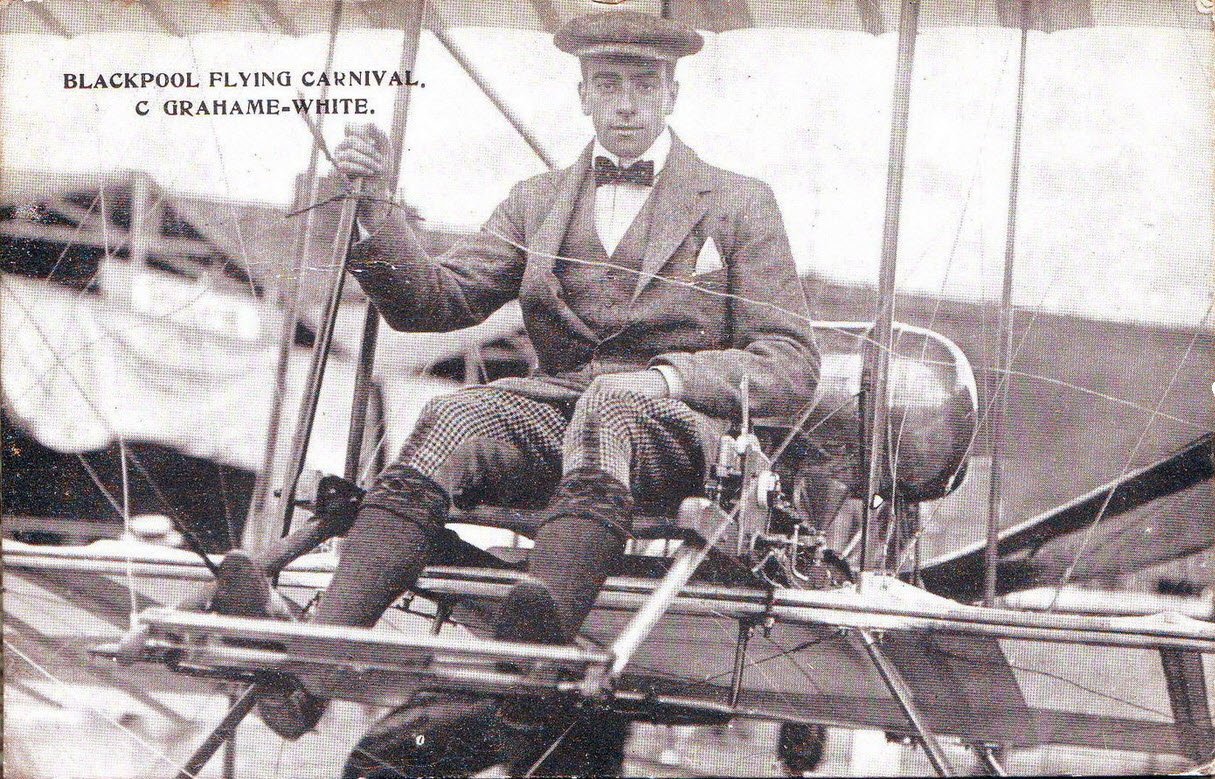
British pilot Claude Grahame-White at Blackpool Flying Carnival 1910.

Florence Parbury was interested in aviation from its early days in England. In 1910 she attended the Blackpool Flying Carnival where she was a passenger in the Henry Farman biplane flown by Claude Grahame-White. She attended his first marriage in June 1912, where almost all the other guests were eminent in the world of aviation. Parbury also described how she flew over Stonehenge in a biplane piloted by Howard Pixton, an early British aviator who won the 1914 Schneider Trophy air race held in Monaco.

=== Travel, exploration and publishing before World War 1 ===
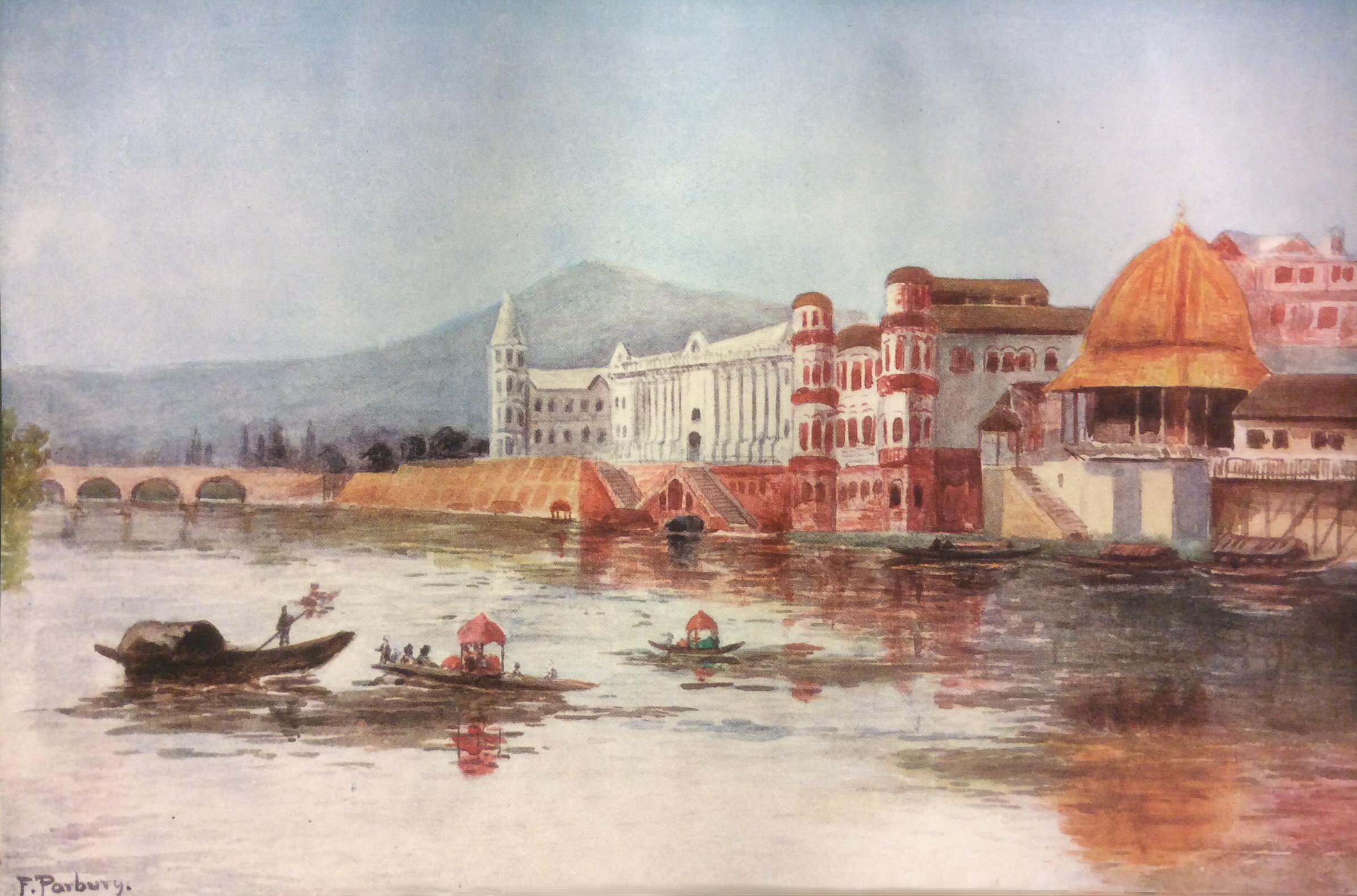
The Maharajah's Palace at Srinigar, painted by Florence Parbury

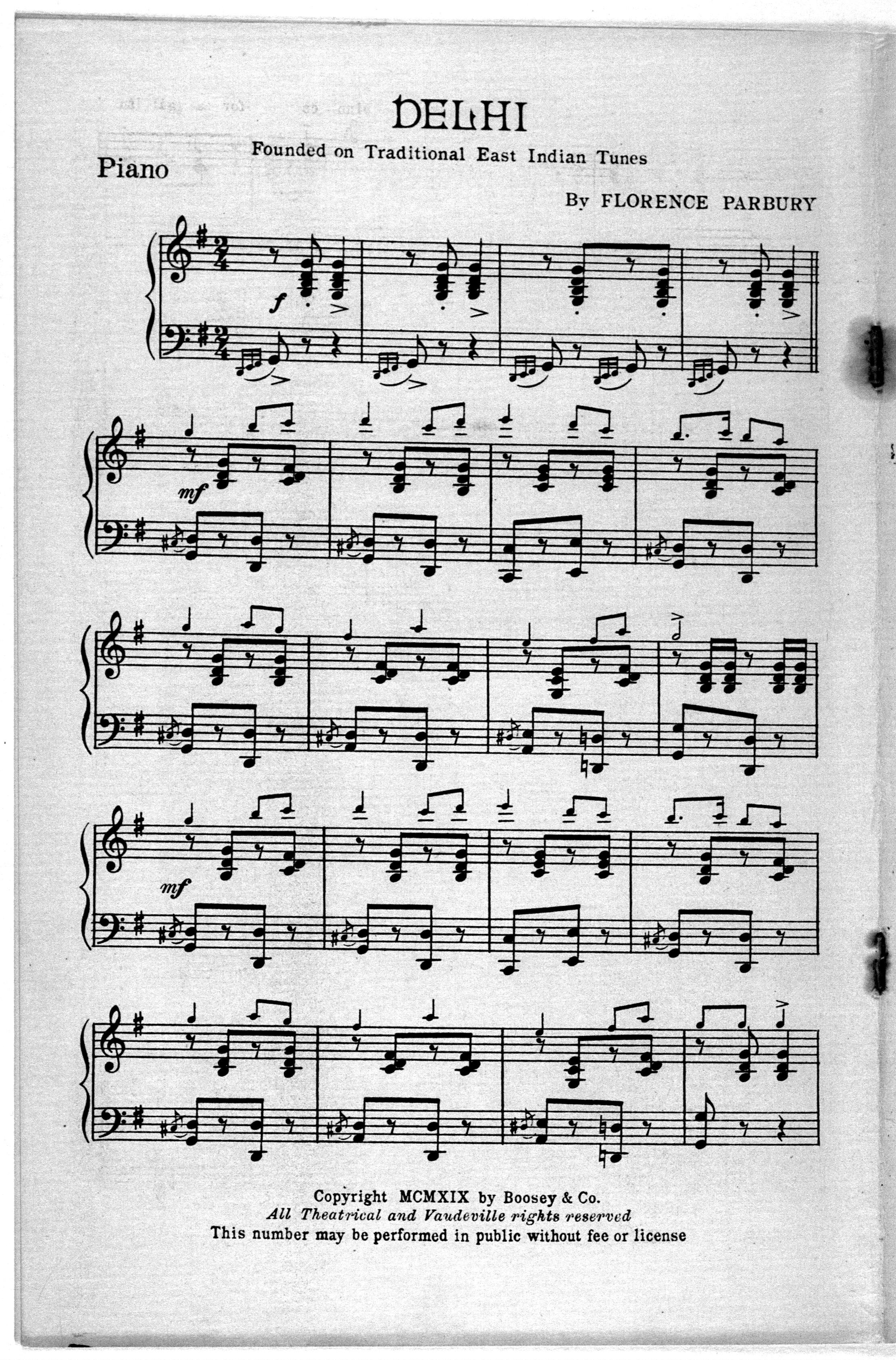
"Delhi: Founded on Traditional East Indian Tunes". One of 18 pages of sheet music for multiple instruments; written by Florence Parbury.

Parbury travelled to Egypt when she was sixteen and then in 1901 she and her mother sailed to India from London on the P&O steamship Caledonia and then spent several months travelling in Kashmir. In 1909, Parbury published a description of their travels, including many of her paintings of local scenes and, ten years later, published sheet music evoking her experience in India.

Parbury's later travels were to North America. In 1911, in Victoria, BC she spoke at the Women's Canadian Club, saying how she planned to study the country and its people, much as she had done in India. After returning to England in February 1912, she went back to Canada towards the end of that year. Again in BC, she met Dr Charles Newcombe, an ethnographer with a keen interest in the indigenous peoples of the region. After her visit, Parbury wrote to him several times in late 1912 and early 1913 saying that she would "so like to reproduce a photograph of that interesting case of curios & Indian trophies & relics, for my book." While in BC Parbury also organised a trip in which

she camped, climbed, rode on a cayuse through the Rockies, trekked up the Thompson River−the first white woman to be seen on its banks−with a train of five horses and six guides and packers; sometimes she guided her own canoe on the river, shooting the rapids, and taking all the risks of a journey in the wilds. She reached the famous Tête Jaune Cache beyond Edmonton, and her book, illustrated by herself, on her Canadian experiences, will be published after the war. Miss Parbury does not actually shoot big game, but like her friend, Mr. Thompson Seton, she enjoys the call of the wild and the tracking of shy creatures to their lairs.

The book "Impressions of Canada" which she was planning to publish was advertised by Macmillan's but has not so far been found.

== Care of soldiers in World War I ==
When the war broke out Parbury nursed for eight months in France with the French Red Cross. It was probably this experience which prompted her to launch an appeal:

Miss Parbury is anxious to collect a million cigarettes for our soldiers. She will take them with her in batches and distribute them. Without publicity up to the present, she has obtained 75,000, thanks to the contributions of Sir John Thornycroft, Mr. Harry Gratton, Mr. Gerald du Maurier, Mr. Henry Ainley, and others. For 6s. 8d. a thousand cigarettes can be obtained, and they are given away coupled with the names of the donors, and a friendly message. Save a solicitor's letter and send our Tommies a thousand cigarettes. Miss Parbury's address is 53 Egerton Gardens, S.W.

Back in London, Parbury set up a "Jacobean studio" at Yeoman's Row, Knightsbridge where she and others would entertain wounded soldiers with sing-songs. In an interview in Montreal after the war she said "I know of three cases where sight, hearing and speech were restored while an entertainment was in progress, to men who had lost three senses through shell shock. We have had as many as 50 nerve cases present at the same time, and during the war we entertained in all 600,000 men".

On another occasion, hearing that Sir Robert Borden, Prime Minister of Canada, was in London she immediately wrote to seek his patronage for a matinée at the Queen's Theatre in aid of the Canadian Red Cross, which Canadian soldiers would attend; Sir Robert's successful visit, during which he honoured the men and their dead comrades for their sacrifices, was recorded in The Times.

=== Travel after World War 1 ===
In May 1919 "Miss Parbury, author" sailed first class to New York on the Aquitania. She stayed in North America for two years, and while in New York had "a permanent suite at the Commodore and a country house on Long Island.” Once again part of her quest was to study a nation and its peoples, and publish her findings. She also indulged her interest in aviation by attending special events and flying when she could. In July 1919 she sent a postcard to London via the British airship R34 when it left Mineola, NY. After staying with the Governor of Newfoundland, Sir Alexander Harris, in St John's, as "part of a well-earned post-war vacation", Parbury returned to New York where she had portraits taken by the renowned photographer Arnold Genthe . At the end of the year, "garbed as a Maharani", she spoke at a meeting of the American Geographical Society in New York on "Kashmir, the Garden of the East". In December 1919 she gave an interview to New York newspapers in which she introduced another objective of her trip: to establish a “League of Friendship” between England and the United States: “If New York likes her and she likes New York, she will establish a clubhouse in New York and a companion house in London to further the interest of the League.”

During 1920 Parbury exhibited her paintings in the west ballroom of the Hotel Commodore on Lexington Avenue; flew in an escort plane from Central Park, Long Island to San Francisco, as part of the inauguration of transcontinental Pathfinder Flights; and stayed in Hollywood as a guest of Mr. and Mrs. Douglas Fairbanks. This circuit, which included stops in Decatur, Chicago, Dayton and Detroit, gave her more opportunities to promote her League of Friendship idea, which she also referred to as a Friendship Club for Anglo-Saxons: "I want to have a beautiful clubhouse in every large city around the world where the English-speaking peoples can meet..." In 1921, Parbury was in Washington DC, where she announced that she had two books coming out in the fall, "Careering in Canada” and "Atmosphering in America.” They were to be published in practically the same form, with her own illustrations, but never appeared. Before returning to England, Parbury was one of the artistes in a musicale at the home of Adolph Lewisohn, 811 Fifth Avenue, for the benefit of the New York Community Service clubhouse for disabled and active service men.

During her stay in the United States, Parbury had taken several opportunities to indulge her interest in aviation. In July 1919 she sent a postcard to London via the British airship R34 when it left Mineola, NY. When the new British Ambassador to the United States, Sir Auckland Geddes and his wife, arrived from Liverpool on the Kaiserin Auguste Victoria in 1920 "Miss Florence Parbury welcomed him to America by flying over the ship in an airplane to drop a bouquet of American Beauty roses." The Canadian pilot was Captain Leonard B. Hyde Pearson, and a movie clip of the event is available online. Later that year Parbury was a passenger on one of the escort aircraft when three all-metal planes were seeking the best route from New York to San Francisco; a transcontinental air mail service was established in September 1920.

=== Later life and marriage ===
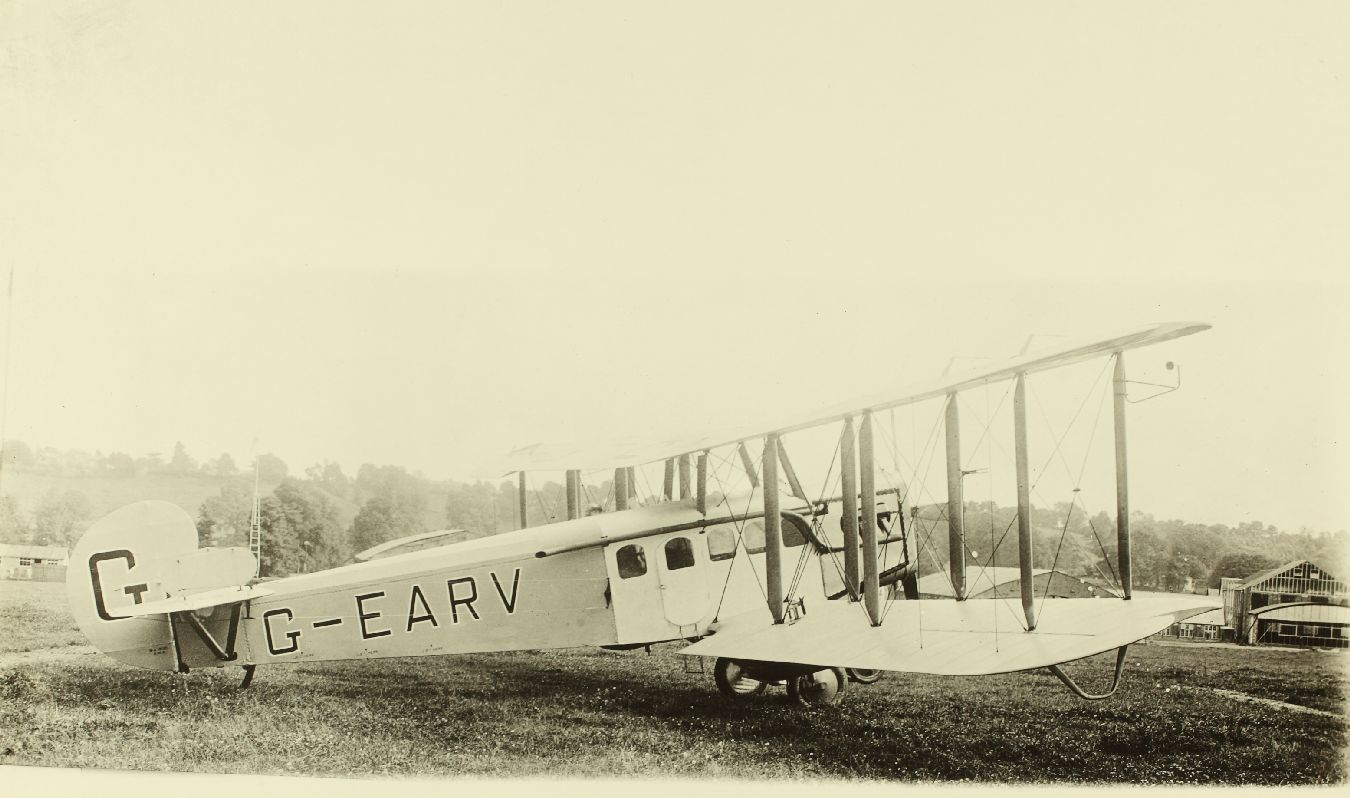
Florence Parbury was a passenger in this Westland Limousine III from Croydon on 13 January 1922.

Back in England, there was another aviation adventure: in January 1922 Parbury flew as a passenger to the Hague, with a Blackburn test pilot, while using wireless telephony to listen to one of her own compositions being played in a hall below. At a private gathering before the flight, one of her guests, Guglielmo Marconi, spoke of the close association between aviation and wireless telephony: “Mention has been made of the possibility of wireless rays passing out through the terrestrial air into space, and of the sending of messages to Mars. Perhaps some day we shall be able to fly in those spaces outside the earth’s envelope, but if ever we do we shall certainly have to change the designs of our machines."

At about this time Parbury was working on another big project. She had in mind “a bond of harmony between the people of the Empire” mediated through an annual music festival in London. The first British Empire Music Festival was held at the Royal Albert Hall on St. Cecilia's Day (22 November) 1922, which included patriotic music of Canada, four of the "Six Australian Bush Songs" by W. G. James, "Rule Britannia" and tunes from the Pipers of the Scots Guards. The festivals continued for a few more years, and at the third one in 1924 Dame Clara Butt sang.

Three days after the first BEMF Florence Tyzack Parbury was married at Holy Trinity Brompton to Ernest Bigland. The ceremony was performed by Alfred William Gough, Prebendary of St Paul's Cathedral, assisted by the Rev. Canon Sir John Key, Bt., a cousin of the bride. Ernest Bigland, some thirty years Parbury's senior, was a ship owner. The couple lived at Ernest's home: Scote Howe, Hook Heath, Woking, Surrey, where Florence enjoyed growing specimen flowers for exhibition. At the RHS Chelsea Flower Show in 1928 she was awarded an Award of Merit for Begonia Florence Bigland, "a magnificent double-flowered variety [with] broad petals of shining apricot colour". In this same year she composed more music, including "Abbey Wedding March" and "Sonning" (dedicated to the bride) for the wedding at St Margaret's, Westminster of John Raymond Ropner to Joan Redhead on 24 July 1928. The bridegroom was the grandson of Sir Emil Hugo Oscar Robert Ropner, 1st Baronet, ship builder and ship owner. It was probably through the shipping connection that Mrs Bigland wrote music for this occasion.

Ernest Bigland died at his home on 10 December 1942. Florence continued living there until about 1949, after which she moved to London. She lived her final years at Flat 11, 51 South Street, W1, close to Park Lane. She died there on 24 October 1960, leaving a considerable fortune. In her will she said "I desire to be cremated and my ashes to be scattered by my confidential chauffeur George Upfield over the tree to be indicated by me." It is not known where that was.
