= Sarah Carter (disambiguation) =

Sarah Carter is a Canadian actress, writer and director.

Sarah Carter may also refer to:

- Sarah Carter (historian), Canadian historian
- Sarah Carter (politician), Australian politician
- Sarah Carter Edgarton Mayo, American author and editor

== See also ==
- Sara Carter, American country music musician, singer, and songwriter
- Sara Carter (journalist), American journalist and nominee to be the director of the Office of National Drug Control Policy
- Sara Lou Harris Carter, African-American model
