= Astbury =

Astbury is a surname. Notable people with the surname include:

- Andrew Astbury, English swimmer
- David Astbury, Australian Rules footballer
- Ian Astbury, English rock singer
- Jill Astbury, Australian researcher into violence against women
- John Astbury, English potter
- William Astbury, English physicist and molecular biologist

== See also ==
- Newbold Astbury, often just Astbury, a village in Cheshire
