= Ibbott =

Ibbott is a surname. Notable people with the surname include:

- Brian Ibbott, American podcaster
- Nellie Grace Ibbott (1889–1970), British-born mayor of Heidelberg, Victoria, Australia
