= University of Melbourne Faculty of Science =

The Faculty of Science at the University of Melbourne is one of the largest in Australia, with over 10,000 undergraduate and postgraduate students and a significant interdisciplinary research agenda.

Melbourne University's Faculty of Science is one of the oldest and most prestigious science faculties in the world. It is the premier #1 ranking Faculty in Australia for research in the biological sciences, chemistry, physics and astronomy. The Faculty of Science ranks in the top 3 in Australia in all fields of science, and in the top 50 worldwide.

The current dean is Professor Moira O'Bryan a distinguished fertility geneticist and graduate of the University of Melbourne. Dr. O’Bryan's research focuses on sperm development and function, genetic and environmental causes of human infertility, contraception and how 'reproductive’ proteins affect overall health.

== History ==
Scientific study, including physics and botany, was foundational to the University of Melbourne in its early years: the physics laboratory opened in 1855, and the System Garden was planted in 1856. The Bachelor of Science and Doctor of Science degrees were first established at the University of Melbourne in 1886, and the Faculty of Science itself was officially established in 1903.

== Schools in the Faculty of Science ==
- School of BioSciences
- School of Chemistry
- School of Earth Sciences
- School of Ecosystem and Forest Sciences
- School of Geography
- School of Mathematics and Statistics
- School of Physics
- Office for Environmental Programs
- Bio21 Molecular Science and Biotechnology Institute

== Degree structure ==
The degree structure is highly flexible, offering a three-year undergraduate Bachelor of Science (BSc) with 40 undergraduate majors across the seven Schools in the faculty, plus the School of Engineering and the Faculty of Medicine, Dentistry and Health sciences. The faculty also offers practical graduate coursework Diplomas and Certificates; two-year graduate coursework master's degrees; two-year Masters by research (MPhil) and three- to four-year PhDs (Doctor of Philosophy – Science).

== Research centres ==
The Faculty of Science at Melbourne is a significant centre for scientific research, with over 400 researchers and 500 graduate research students (4). Researchers have access to extensive research infrastructure, services and technology platforms ranging from advanced microscopy facilities and mass spectrometry facilities to historical university museums and collections.

Researchers at the Science Faculty lead several major research centres, including:

- The ARC Centre of Excellence for Exciton Science
- The Bio21 Molecular Science and Biotechnology Institute
- The ARC Centre of Excellence for Mathematical and Statistical Frontiers
- The Centre of Excellence for Biosecurity Risk Analysis
- The National Environmental Science Programme Clean Air and Urban Landscapes Hub

== Notable academics ==
Notable academics who are currently taking part in research at the Faculty of Science include:

- Crystallographer professor Michael Parker (Director of Bio21 institute)
- Ecologist Dr Jane Elith, Prime Minister's Life Scientist of the Year 2017
- Physicist professor Lloyd Hollenberg (deputy director of the Centre for Quantum Computation and Communication Technology)
- Mathematician professor John Sader, inventor of the Sader Method for atomic force microscope calibration
- Chemistry professor Frances Separovic, first woman elected to the Australian Academy of Science in chemistry

== Notable alumni ==
The Faculty of Science has produced a number of notable graduates who are leaders in their field, including:

- David Karoly: Senior climate scientist, National Environmental Science Programme Earth System and Climate Change Hub.
- Elizabeth Blackburn: Nobel laureate
- Georgina Sweet: Zoologist and first female acting professor in an Australian university
- Jean Laby: Atmospheric physicist
- Karen Day: Malaria researcher and dean of Faculty of Science at the University of Melbourne
- Andrew Holmes: President of the Australian Academy of Science
- Alison Harcourt: Mathematician and co-creator of the branch and bound algorithm

== See also ==
- Victorian School of Forestry
