= Victorian Honour Roll of Women =

The Victorian Honour Roll of Women was established in 2001 to recognise the achievements of women from the Australian state of Victoria. It was launched by The Hon. Joan Kirner AC as a joint initiative of the Centenary of Federation Victoria Committee, the Office for Women's Policy and the Women Shaping the Nation Steering Committee as part of the celebrations of Victoria's Centenary of Federation.

Public nominations for the Honour Roll open in the first half of each year and the inductees are reviewed by an independent panel of women. A short list of candidates is then sent to the Victorian Government Minister for Women for her consideration and selection.

The Honour Roll celebrates exceptional women in Victoria who have made significant and lasting contributions to their communities, the nation or the world. Women are recognised for their achievements in a broad range of fields, including science, arts, environment, law, social justice, family violence prevention, research, health, media and education.

More than 790 women have been inducted onto the Honour Roll since 2001. In previous years, the Office for Women produced commemorative booklets that contain biographical sketches of each woman on the Honour Roll. Currently, all inductees are displayed on the Women Victoria webpage.

== Inductees ==
Victorian Honour Roll of Women
Name	Image	Birth–Death	Year	Area of achievement
Diana R. Abruzzi			2020	Founder and International Chairman of the International Women's Federation of Commerce and Industry (IWFCI)
Elizabeth Adnams			2022	Girl Guides official
Mary Agostino			2021	Leadership in health during COVID-19 pandemic
Angeline Achariya			2025	Sustainable food production
Abiola Akinbiyi			2025	Culturally and linguistically diverse healthcare
Doreen Akkerman			2010	Director at Cancer Council Victoria
Susan Alberti		(1947–)	2014	Businesswoman, philanthropist and Vice President of the Western Bulldogs Football Club
Lilian Helen Alexander		(1862–1934)	2007	Co-founder of Queen Victoria Hospital
Elizabeth Alfred		(1914–2015)	2001	Head Deaconess, and first woman priested in Melbourne
Beth Allen		(1958–)	2004	Rural community nurse
Rowena Allen			2009	Advocate for GLBTI communities, refugees, youth and single parents
Diane Alley		(1927–2021)	2001	Women's rights activist
Lyn Allison		(1946–)	2012	Member of the Australian Senate from 1996 to 2008
Leila Alloush			2006	Founding member of the Islamic Women's Welfare Council of Victoria
Betty Amsden		(1926–2017)	2013	Volunteer, philanthropist and supporter of arts and animal welfare organisations
Alice Elizabeth Foley Anderson		(1897–1926)	2020	Mechanic, and owner of Alice Anderson Motor Service
Carla Anderson			2008	Advocate for Victoria's Deaf and Deafblind community
Marilyn Anderson			2014	FAA, FTSE
Maybanke Anderson		(1845–1927)	2001	Reformer involved in women's suffrage and federation
Mary Anderson		(1875–1956)	2001	Salvation Army Officer
Julie Andrews			2024	Indigenous researcher and university professor
Aunty Phyllis Andy			2007	Indigenous community leader
Akuch Kuol Anyieth		(1991–)	2023	Academic researcher, advocate, author and emerging community leader
Vasso Apostolopoulos		(1970–)	2004	Medical researcher
Alice Appleford		(1891–1968)	2008	War heroine, nurse and humanitarian
Brenda Appleton			2017	
Kerry Arabena			2025	Indigenous health
Robyn Archer		(1948–)	2001	Singer, writer, stage and director, artistic director, and public advocate of the arts
Lillian May Armfield		(1884–1971)	2001	Pioneering Sydney female police detective
Jean Armstrong			2008	Engineer
Hana Assafiri			2017	
Jill Astbury			2008	Researcher into violence against women
Anne Astin			2010	Biochemist and forensic scientist
Tilly Aston		(1873–1947)	2001	Blind writer and teacher who founded the Victorian Association of Braille Writers and the Association for the Advancement of the Blind
Varvara Athanasiou-Ioannou		(1953–)	2003	Human resources consultant
Aunty Geraldine Atkinson		(1952–)	2008	Koori educator
Aunty Mary Atkinson		(1937–2004)	2001	Wiradjuri and Bangerang elder involved in Aboriginal education
Elizabeth Austin		(1821–1910)	2012	Pioneer and philanthropist during the late 19th century
Kate Austin			2024	
Ruth Austin		(1922–2004)	2003	Provider of welfare for infants
Wendy Austin			2015	
Maya Avdibegovic			2020	Advocate for victims of family violence
Melanie Bahlo			2024	Geneticist
Samia Baho			2008	Social justice activist
Dianne Bailey-Tribe			2007	Community worker concerned with autism
Rosanna Baini		(1963–)	2002	Community worker and Commissioner of the Victorian Multicultural Commission
Heather Baird			2023	Foster care
Bianca Baldassi		(1924–2011)	2001	Worked with the Association of Senior Italian Citizens Clubs of Victoria and the Italian Pensioners Club of Northcote
Aunty Esmerelda Bamblett			2023	Bangerang, Wiradjuri and Taungurung woman, community advocate, educator, researcher and writer
Muriel Bamblett			2011	Yorta Yorta indigenous leader
Faith Bandler		(1918–2015)	2001	Civil rights activist of South Sea Islander heritage. She is a campaigner for the rights of Indigenous Australians and South Sea Islanders. Bandler is best known for her leadership in the campaign for the 1967 referendum on Aboriginal Australians.
Nola Barber		(1901–1985)	2001	Mayor and community worker
Mary Gonzaga Barry			2025	Education for girls
Wanda Bargo Braybrook			2023	Advocate for Aboriginal women and children
Helen Barnacle		(1953–)	2004	Legal rights and social justice activist
Jody Barney			2021	Advocate for Aboriginal and Torres Strait Islander people with disabilities
Catherine Barrett			2023	Academic and aged care nurse, founder of Celebrate Ageing
Susan Barton			2012	Founder and Director of the Lighthouse Foundation for Homeless Youth
Nina Bassat		(1939–)	2003	Leader in Victoria's Jewish community
Karen Batt			2001	Victorian branch secretary of the Community and Public Sector Union
Rosemary Batty		(1962–)	2015	Anti-domestic violence activist
Gracia Baylor		(1929–2025)	2003	One of the first two women elected to the Victorian Legislative Council in 1979
Isabel Joy Bear		(1927–2021)	2005	Scientific researcher
Annette Bear-Crawford		(1853–1899)	2007	Women's suffragist and federationist
Rosalyn Beaton			2009	Advocate for English as a second language students
Marilyn Beaumont			2007	Executive Director of Women's Health Victoria
Beryl Beaurepaire		(1923–2018)	2001	Activist and politician
Linda Beilharz		(1960–)	2006	First Australian woman to reach the South Pole
Jane Bell		(1873–1959)	2013	Nursing advocate and pioneer
Aunty Laura Bell		(1936–)	2001	Gunditjmara educator who chairs the Victorian Aboriginal Education Association Incorporated (VAEAI) and founded the Winda-Mara Aboriginal Co-operative
Lisa Bellear		(1961–2006)	2008	Indigenous Australian poet, photographer, activist, spokeswoman, dramatist, comedian and broadcaster.
Carmel Benjamin		(1932–)	2004	Criminal justice advocate
Concetta Benn		(1926–2011)	2002	Social justice activist
Lou Bennett			2017	Musician and performer
Mary Bennett		(1881–1961)	2001	Educator and advocate of Aboriginal rights
Elleni Bereded-Samuel			2006	Community worker and advocate for migrant women
Dagmar Berne		(1866–1900)	2001	Medical doctor and the first female student to study medicine in Australia
Maria Berry			2020	Women's football player, administrator, coach and board member
Wilma Beswick			2013	Clinical educator
Gulghotai Bezhan			2021	Afghan community leader
Carrie Bickmore		(1980–)	2017	Radio and television presenter
Patricia Bigham			2017	
Jocelyn Bignold			2009	Supporter of women prisoners
MaryAnn Bin-Sallik		(1940–2026)	2001	Academic, Indigenous studies
Nancy Bird Walton		(1915–2009)	2001	Aviator and the founder and patron of the Australian Women Pilots' Association
Ruth Bishop		(1933–2022)	2001	Leading member of the team that discovered the human rotavirus
Hope Black		(1919–2018)	2012	Marine biologist and the first female curator at Museum Victoria
Josie Black		(1938–2009)	2007	Community activist and educator
Elizabeth Blackburn		(1948–)	2010	Biological researcher who studies the telomere, a structure at the end of chromosomes that protects the chromosome. Blackburn co-discovered the enzyme telomerase and was awarded the 2009 Nobel Prize in Physiology or Medicine.
Jean Edna Blackburn		(1919–2001)	2002	Academic, educator and policy maker
Margaret Blackwood		(1909–1986)	2001	Botanist and geneticist
Penny Blazey			2005	Advocate for sustainability and East Timorese women
Aunty Walda Blow		(1941–2015)	2012	Yorta Yorta elder and community activist
Dianne Boddy			2014	Hon FIE Aust, CPEng
Pamela Bone		(1940–2008)	2001	Journalist
Anna Booth			2001	Business executive
Eleanor Bourke			2010	Pioneering Aboriginal activist
Margaret Bourke		(1887–1979)	2001	
Jacqueline Boyle			2015	Obstetrician and gynaecologist working to improving Aboriginal and refugee women's health
Terry Bracks			2011	Advocate for youth and women and founder of Western Chances
Antoinette Braybrook			2020	Campaigner against family violence, particularly in the Aboriginal and Torres Strait Islander community
Marie Breen		(1902–1993)	2010	Member of the Australian Senate representing the Liberal Party of Australia
Carolyn Briggs		(1948–)	2005	Elder of the Bunurong people
Aunty Geraldine Briggs		(1910–2005)	2001	
Candy Broad		(1956–)	2025	politician
Ivy Brookes		(1883–1970)	2001	Founder of the Housewives Co-operative Association of Victoria
Aunty Edna Brown		(1916–2006)	2015	Gunditjmara Elder, established the Aboriginal Funeral Benefits Fund
Joyce Brown		(1938–)	2001	Australian netball team coach
Sally Brown		(1950–2025)	2003	Family court judge and first woman Chief Magistrate of Victoria
Fanny Brownbill		(1890–1948)	2003	Australian Labor Party Member for Geelong, Victoria, serving from 1938 until 1948. Brownbill was the first woman to win a seat for Labor in Victoria.
Anne Brunell		(1970–)	2007	Paralympic athlete
Lucy Meredith Bryce		(1897–1968)	2001	Hematologist
Dorothy Buckland-Fuller		(1922–2019)	2001	Human rights activist, migrant community advocate and sociologist
Vivian Bullwinkel		(1915–2000)	2001	Nurse, prisoner of war
Gina Bundle			2020	Maternity care to Aboriginal and Torres Strait Islander women
Eva Burrows		(1929–2015)	2001	13th General of the Salvation Army
Betty Burstall		(1926–2013)	2001	Founder, La Mama
Muriel Bush		(1897–1981)	2001	
Betty Butcher		(1925–1999)	2006	Cricketer
Ita Buttrose		(1942–)	2001	Journalist and businesswoman. She was the founding editor of the women's magazine Cleo and served as the editor of The Australian Women's Weekly
Sheila Byard			2017	Services to women
Val Byth		(1930–2021)	2001	
Karen Cain			2023	Community leadership
Helen Caldicott		(1938–)	2001	Physician, author, and anti-nuclear advocate who founded several associations dedicated to opposing the use of nuclear power, depleted uranium munitions, nuclear weapons, nuclear weapons proliferation, war and military action in general.
Elena Campbell			2025	Law reform
Kate Isabel Campbell		(1899–1986)	2001	Physician and paediatrician
Louise Margaret Cannon			2009	Melbourne's first woman fire station officer
Elaine Canty			2006	First female sports broadcaster on ABC radio and television
Eileen Capocchi		(1925–2019)	2010	Advocate for migrant and working women's rights
Carol Carey			2020	International resuscitation educator
Simone Carson			2016	Sustainable food security
Fay Carter		(1935–2024)	2004	Aboriginal community leader
Sarah Carter		(1979-2024)	2024	politician and humanitarian
Rebecca Casson			2021	First woman CEO of Master Builders Victoria
Marie Elizabeth Amy Castilla		(1868–1898)	2007	Co-founder of Queen Victoria Hospital
Evonne Cawley		(1951–)	2001	Tennis player
Hilary Charlesworth		(1955–)	2001	Pioneer in feminist international law scholarship
Deborah Cheetham		(1964–)	2015	Aboriginal opera singer, actor, and playwright
Wesa Wai-Sum Chau			2012	Community organiser and advocate for cultural diversity
Jean Cheshire		(1920–2015)	2006	Religious educator
Ada Cheung			2024	Endocrinologist
Joan Child		(1921–2013)	2001	First woman Speaker of the Australian House of Representatives
Caroline Chisholm		(1808–1877)	2001	Progressive 19th-century English humanitarian known mostly for her involvement with female immigrant welfare in Australia
Betty Churcher		(1931–2015)	2001	Artist and director of the National Gallery of Australia from 1990 to 1997
Caterina Cinanni			2025	First woman president, National Union of Workers
Catherine Cini			2019	CEO of GriefLine Family and Community Services
Vicki Clark			2001	
Adrienne Clarke		(1938–)	2001	Professor of Botany at University of Melbourne
Billi Clarke		(1958–)	2004	Campaigner against family violence
Jennifer Coate		(1953–)	2025	Family Court judge
Sally Cockburn		(1958–)	2010	Medical practitioner, activist and radio personality
Judith Cohen		(1926–2012)	2002	Lawyer, Commissioner of the Australian Conciliation and Arbitration Commission and founding member of the National Council of Jewish Women's Foundation
Carola Cohn		(1892–1964)	2007	Artist, author and philanthropist best known for her work in sculpture in a modernist style and famous for her Fairies Tree in the Fitzroy Gardens, Melbourne
Marie Coleman		(1933–)	2001	Activist, public servant and journalist
Colleen Mary Condliffe			2009	Advocate for rural farmers
Zoe Condliffe			2021	Crowd founder and advocate to end gender-based violence
Margaret (Madge) Connor		(c. 1874–1952)	2019	Advocate for policewomen's rights
Cecilia Conroy			2011	Educator of special needs children
Bev Cook			2010	Community leader from Mallee
Lynn Corcoran			2013	Laboratory head Molecular Immunology Division Walter and Eliza Hall Institute, Melbourne
Edwina Cornish			2013	Professor at Monash University
Suzanne Cory		(1942–)	2001	Biologist and President of the Australian Academy of Science
Kay Cottee		(1954–)	2001	First female sailor to perform a single-handed, non-stop circumnavigation of the world. She performed this feat in 1988 in her 37 feet (11 m) yacht Blackmore's First Lady, taking 189 days
Lynne Coulson Barr			2014	
Margaret Court		(1942–)	2001	Tennis player
Edith Cowan		(1861–1932)	2001	Politician, social campaigner and the first woman elected to an Australian parliament
Dorothy Crawford		(1911–1988)	2004	Pioneer in Australian television drama
Joanne Crawford			2021	Gender equality, sustainable development and anti-poverty work
Susan Crennan		(1945–)	2013	Judge and lawyer
Catherine Crock			2013	Pioneer of patient-centred care
Mary Crooks		(1950–)	2001	
Ruth Hope Crow		(1916–1999)	2008	Community activist
Elizabeth Crowther			2012	Chief Executive of the Mental Illness Fellowship of Victoria
Merna Curnow			2014	
Pamela Curr			2009	Human rights campaigner
Betty Cuthbert		(1938–2017)	2001	Olympic athlete
Margaret Cuthberston		(1864–1944)	2001	
Marg D’Arcy		(1950–)	2003	Campaigner against violence directed towards women
Janice Margaret Dale			2005	Nurse and mentor to women
Zelda D'Aprano		(1928–2018)	2001	Unionist and women's equal pay activist, best known for chaining herself to the Commonwealth Building in Melbourne when a court case failed to secure equal pay for women in the meat industry.
Dur-e Dara		(1945–)	2001	Philanthropist and restaurateur
Lisa Darmanin		(1991–)	2016	Competitive sailor and activist for women's equality
Jamice Valma Davey		(1941–2021)	2022	Brass band leader
Louise Davidson			2008	Fundraiser for breast cancer research
Anne Davie			2005	Community worker in southwest Gippsland
Liz Dawes			2025	Fundraiser for paediatric brain cancer
Sandie de Wolf			2011	Children's welfare activist
Linda Dessau		(1953–)	2018	29th Governor of Victoria and first female
Maria Dimopoulos		(1965–)	2012	Women's rights activist
Noeleen Dix			2016	Netball administration
Maria Dudycz			2018	Human rights for people with disabilities
Henrietta Dugdale		(1827–1918)	2001	Feminist who initiated the first female suffrage society in Australasia. Her campaigning resulted in breakthroughs for women's rights in Australia.
Fay Duncan		(1935–2016)	2014	
Trisha Dunning		(1947–2021)	2014	AM
Fanny Durack		(1889–1956)	2001	Swimmer
Helen Durham		(1968–)	2014	
Ella Ebery		(1915–2019)	2004	Journalist and community advocate
Eva Eden		(1924–2014)	2015	Veterinary science, agricultural science and pharmacy educator
Patricia Edgar		(1937–)	2001	Author, television producer and educator, best known as the founding director of the Australian Children's Television Foundation
Diana Egerton-Warburton		(1965–)	2018	Emergency medicine and public health
Mary Jeevaranee Eliezer			2001	
Lorraine Elliott		(1943–2014)	2015	Member of Parliament Victoria and Parliamentary Secretary for the Arts
Liz Ellis		(1973–)	2006	Netball player
Ngaire Elwood			2022	Advancing regenerative medicine, cord blood, stem cells and cancer research.
Mary Evans		(1915–2004)	2001	
Yvonne Evans			2009	Community worker
Marguerite Evans-Galea			2017	Scientist and advocate and mentor for women in STEMM
Elizabeth Evatt		(1933–)	2001	Reformist lawyer and jurist who sat on numerous national and international tribunals and commissions, was the first Chief Judge of the Family Court of Australia, the first female judge of an Australian federal court, and the first Australian to be elected to the United Nations Human Rights Committee
June Factor		(1936–2024)	2001	Children's author
Fartun Farah			2024	
Beatrice Faust		(1939–2019)	2001	Author and women's activist. She was a co-founder of Women's Electoral Lobby and President of the Victorian Abortion Law Repeal Association.
Lynette Fearn-Wannan			2009	Pioneer in child care and community services
Linda Fenton		(1956–2000)	2003	Aboriginal community leader
Doseena Fergie			2016	Aboriginal wellbeing
Dale Fisher			2011	First woman to be Chief Executive of the Royal Women's Hospital
Kate Fitz-Gibbon			2025	Preventing violence against women and children
Lisa Fitzpatrick			2025	Nursing patient ratios
Marilyn Fleer			2022	Director of the Monash PlayLab and foundation chair in Early Childhood Education and Development at Monash University
Julia Flynn		(1878–1947)	2001	Educationist
Christine Forster		(1939–)	2004	Conservationist and natural resource manager
Maria Forsyth			2020	Chemistry researcher making Australia environmentally sustainable
Lilian Fowler		(1886–1954)	2001	Australia's first female mayor
Irene Frangioudaki			2013	Journalist in Victoria's Hellenic community
Miles Franklin		(1879–1954)	2001	Writer and feminist who is best known for her novel My Brilliant Career, published in 1901
Dawn Fraser		(1937–)	2001	Swimmer and politician
Cathy Freeman		(1973–)	2001	Sprinter who specialised in the 400 metres event
Lyndie Freestone			2024	
Phyllis Frost		(1917–2004)	2001	Welfare worker and philanthropist who chaired the Victorian Women's Prisons Council, established the Keep Australia Beautiful movement, and worked for Freedom from Hunger, raising millions of dollars for charity
Jan Fullerton			2001	First female Director General of the National Library of Australia
Belinda Gabbe			2018	
Raffaela Galati-Brown			2001	Principal of the Northern College of the Arts & Technology
Rhonda Louise Galbally		(1948–)	2005	Founding CEO of Our Community Pty.
Mary Galea		(1951–)	2014	
Jessica Gallagher		(1986–)	2018	Board Director Vision 2020 Australia
Jill Gallagher		(1955–)	2009	Community activist
Michelle Gallaher			2018	Life sciences and health sector advocatea
Elfreda Hilda Gamble		(1871–1947)	2007	Co-founder of Queen Victoria Hospital
Sherryl Garbutt		(1948–)	2016	Labor politician
Helen Garner		(1942–)	2001	Novelist, short-story writer, screenwriter and journalist
Mary Gaudron		(1943–2026)	2001	Lawyer and judge who was the first female Justice of the High Court of Australia
Mary Gaunt		(1861–1942)	2002	Novelist
Virginia Geddes			2016	
Sylvia Gelman		(1919–2018)	2012	Jewish community elder; Life Governor and President of the National Council of Jewish Women of Australia
Amanda George			2001	Community lawyer
Jennie George		(1947–)	2001	Former President of the Australian Council of Trade Unions, and Australian Labor Party member of the Australian House of Representatives from 2001 to 2010
Sandra George			2005	Community leader and educator
Paula Gerber			2011	Academic specialising in Construction Law and International Human Rights Law
Sahar Gholizadeh			2022	Nurse and Australian Iranian community activist
Pearl Gibbs		(1901–1983)	2001	Indigenous Australian activist, and the most prominent female activist within the Aboriginal movement in the early 20th century. She was a member of the Aborigines Progressive Association (APA), and was involved with various protest events such as the 1938 Day of Mourning.
Lynda Gibson		(1956–2004)	2007	Comedian
Hetty Gilbert		(1885–1959)	2001	First female President of the Victorian Teachers' Union
Mary Gilmore		(1865–1962)	2001	Socialist poet and journalist
Mary Glowrey		(1887–1957)	2015	Victorian born and educated doctor who spent 37 years in India, where she set up healthcare facilities, services and systems. She is believed to be the first Catholic religious sister to practise as a doctor
Gwenyth Marie Goedecke		(1922–2016)	2009	Councillor and advocate for women
Sally Goldner			2016	LGBTI rights
Vida Goldstein		(1869–1949)	2001	Feminist politician who campaigned for women's suffrage and social reform
Libbi Gorr			2024	
Monica Gould		(1957–)	2018	
Nellie Gould		(1860–1941)	2011	WWI nurse
Helen Gow		(1949–2000)	2001	Community activist
Mary Grant Bruce		(1878–1958)	2002	Children's author and journalist
Michelle Grattan		(1944–)	2001	Journalist who became the first woman to become editor of an Australian metropolitan daily newspaper. Specialising in political journalism, Grattan has written and edited for many significant Australian newspapers.
Germaine Greer		(1939–)	2001	Writer, academic, journalist and scholar of early modern English literature, and a significant feminist voice of the later 20th century
Flos Greig		(1880–1958)	2001	Lawyer and the first woman to be admitted to practise as a barrister and solicitor in Australia
Jane Stocks Greig		(1872–1939)	2007	Co-founder of Queen Victoria Hospital
Janet Lindsay Greig		(1874–1950)	2007	Co-founder of Queen Victoria Hospital
Diana Gribble		(1942–2011)	2001	Publisher, book editor and businessperson
Pamela Griffin		(1939–)	2002	Koori educator and community worker
Doreen Griffiths		(1921–2003)	2001	Salvation Army Officer
Laureen Grimes			2020	Army Reservist since 1980
Patricia Grimshaw		(1938–)	2008	Pioneering women's historian
Bella Guerin		(1858–1923)	2001	Feminist, women's activist women's suffragist, anti-conscriptionist, political activist and schoolteacher
Carmel Guerra			2005	Founder of Ethnic Youth Issues Network and the Centre for Multicultural Youth Issues
Margaret Guilfoyle		(1926–2020)	2001	Senator for the state of Victoria from 1971 to 1987
Jane Gunn			2024	
Robyn Guymer			2021	Macular degeneration specialist
Be Ha			2016	Multiculturalism
Molly Hadfield		(1922–2012)	2006	Social justice activist
Jean Hailes		(1926–1988)	2012	Established the first women's health clinic in Australia at Prince Henry's Hospital in 1971
Janine Haines		(1945–2004)	2001	First female federal parliamentary leader of an Australian political party
Edith Hall		(1933–2011)	2001	Suffragist and campaigner for the disabled
Lesley Hall		(1954–2013)	2014	
Gertrude Halley		(1867–1939)	2007	Co-founder of Queen Victoria Hospital
Ann Halpin		(1939–2009)	2010	Founder of Wellsprings for Women
Amara Hamid			2012	Advocate for women from culturally and linguistically diverse communities
Julie Hammer		(1955–)	2001	First female Air Commodore in the Royal Australian Air Force
Felicity Hampel		(1955–)	2001	Human rights lawyer and judge of the County Court of Victoria
Clare Hanlon			2018	Advocate for women in sport
Roz Hansen			2001	Urban planner
Lisa Happ			2013	
Lisa Hardeman			2019	Policewoman and women's AFL supporter
Nessie Ivy Hardy		(1936–2007)	2009	Environmental campaigner
Shirley Harlock			2012	Advocate for women in Victoria's dairy industry
Tricia Harper			2011	Social justice activist and advocate for single mothers
Jane Harrison			2025	Founder of the Blak & Bright First Nations Literary Festival
Norasiah Hasan			2001	Volunteer worker assisting disadvantaged Muslim women
Sherene Hassan			2018	Ambassador for Muslim community
Joanna Hayter			2016	Gender equality advocate
Karen Hayes			2017	
Muriel Heagney		(1885–1974)	2001	Trade unionist and feminist
Karen Heap			2020	CEO of Ballarat and District Aboriginal Cooperative
Jessie Henderson		(1866–1951)	2001	Social welfare worker
Thenu Herath			2023	Human rights advocate, former CEO of The Oaktree Foundation
Helen Herrman		(1947–)	2013	Professor of Psychiatry
Lesley Hewitt			2010	Advocate for sexual assault victims
Nora Heysen		(1911–2003)	2001	First woman to win the prestigious Archibald Prize in 1938 for portraiture and the first Australian woman appointed as an official war artist
Dorothy Hill		(1907–1997)	2001	Geologist who was the first female professor at an Australian university and the first female president of the Australian Academy of Science.
Kathy Hilton			2008	Youth advocate
Yvonne Ho			2013	
Barbara Hocking		(1947–2016)	2006	Barrister and advocate for Native title in Australia
Elizabeth Hoffman		(1927–2009)	2001	Aboriginal rights activist
Caroline Hogg		(1942–)	2003	Politician for the Australian Labor Party who was a member of the Victorian Legislative Council from 1982 to 1996 and a minister in the governments of John Cain and Joan Kirner
Janet Holmes à Court		(1943–)	2001	Businesswoman and one of Australia's wealthiest women. She is the Chair of Heytesbury Pty Ltd.
Jane den Hollander			2019	Vice-Chancellor of Deakin University and leader in higher education innovation
Yvonne Hong			2025	Founder, Pets Of The Homeless
Janet Horn			2001	
Shirley Horne		(1921–2007)	2001	
Philomena Horsley			2001	Medical anthropologist and social inequalities advocate
Keran Howe			2010	Advocate for women with disabilities
Josie Howie			2018	Advocate for high risk youth
May Hu			2010	Broadcaster and ambassador for Melbourne's Chinese community
Sian Hughes			2006	Paediatrician
Jessica Hull		(1915–2000)	2004	Social activist for women's rights
Catherine Humphreys			2016	Safety of women and children
Ruby Hutchinson		(1892–1974)	2001	Founder of Choice
Nellie Ibbott		(1889–1970)	2001	Victoria's first woman mayor
Nazra Ibrahim		(1963–)	2002	Community worker in the Islamic community
Adelaide Eliza Ironside		(1831–1867)	2001	Artist
Donna Jackson			2001	Founder of the Women's Circus
Helen Jackson		(1931–2021)	2009	Educator
Margaret Jackson		(1953–)	2001	Corporate executive
Marjorie Jackson		(1931–)	2001	Olympic athlete and former Governor of South Australia
Aunty Lola James		(1941–2016)	2021	Yorta Yorta elder; aboriginal health, child welfare and foster care
Margaret Ellen James		(1939–)	2021	Advocate for women's right in universities
Ann Jarvis			2005	Farm manager and advocate of rural education
Anam Javed			2023	Educator, founder of SistaHub
Sandy Jeffs		(1953–)	2001	SANE Australia ambassador
Mary Lou Jelbart			2015	Radio presenter and artistic director of fortyfivedownstairs
Dagmar Jenkins			2020	Providing people with cognitive and speech-related disabilities with access to tailored sexual assault response services
Kate Jenkins		(1968–)	2023	Gender equality activist
Misty Jenkins			2020	Advocate for gender equity, Aboriginal health and education
Barbara Jennings			2007	Community leader in women's health
Chris Jennings			2011	Advocate for women with disabilities
Margaret Jennings		(1949–)	2009	Cricketer
Yvonne Jennings			2012	Community leader
Alana Johnson			2018	Advocate for gender equality
Gertrude Johnson		(1894–1973)	2005	Coloratura soprano and founder of the National Theatre in Melbourne
Keeley Johnson			2024	
Aunty Melva Johnson		(1935–)	2002	Koori activist and community leader
Liz Jones		(1946–)	2002	Actress and artistic director of La Mama Theatre
Mel Jones		(1972–)	2017	Cricketer and television cricket commentator
Jill Joslyn			2011	Nurse, businesswoman and community services professional
Joy Sawiche Juma			2022	Chair of the Ballarat Regional Multicultural Council
Kudzai Kanhutu			2024	
Olga Kanitsaki			2015	Retired nurse specialising in transcultural health care issues
Aishwarya Kansakar			2022	Automation professional
Stella Kariofyllidis			2001	Councillor; first Greek-born Australian woman to become a mayor
Jana Katerinskaja			2023	Senior human rights lawyer, advocate for family and sexual violence victim-survivors, and leader in police accountability reform
Lutfiye Kavci			2025	Advocate for family violence victim-survivors and the homeless
Margaret Keats		(1893–1970)	2008	Veterinary science pioneer
Marie Kehoe			2006	Director at Australian Catholic University
Annette Kellerman		(1886–1975)	2001	Professional swimmer, vaudeville and film star, and writer. She was one of the first women to wear a one-piece bathing costume, instead of the then accepted pantaloons, and inspired others to follow her example.
Catherine Mary Kelly		(–2015)	2016	Marginalised students
Moira Kelly		(1964–)	2014	Humanitarian
Gaby Kennard		(1944–)	2001	First Australian woman to circumnavigate the globe by airplane
Mary Kenneally			2016	Women in the arts and comedy
Kate Kennedy			2021	Human rights advocate
Elizabeth Kenny		(1880–1952)	2001	Nurse who promoted a controversial new approach to the treatment of poliomyelitis in the era before mass vaccination eradicated the disease in most countries. Her findings ran counter to conventional medical wisdom; they demonstrated the need to exercise muscles affected by polio instead of immobilizing them. Kenny's principles of muscle rehabilitation became the foundation of physical therapy, or physiotherapy.
Jill Ker Conway		(1934–2018)	2001	Academic and author
Nerida Kerr			2013	
Sika Kerry			2008	Advocate for women and migrants and the first woman councillor in Footscray
Zuleyha Keskin			2020	Advocate for the Australian-Muslim community
Aayushi Khillan			2024	Health educator
Winifred Kiek		(1884–1975)	2001	In 1927 first woman ordained to Protestant Christian church in Australia
Lynne Killeen			2019	Advocate for Aboriginal women in custody
Christine Kilpatrick			2014	
Priscilla Kincaid-Smith		(1926–2015)	2001	Physician and researcher, specializing in nephrology
Skye Kinder			2021	Health equality advocate
Bronwyn King			2018	Anti-tobacco campaigner
Donna King			2006	Advocate for prisoners
Ethleen King		(1906–1999)	2006	Lawyer and founder of organisations
Ingeborg King		(1915–2016)	2016	Sculptor
Rosanne King			2021	Advocate for gender equality in sport
Rae Kingsbury			2017	Former Mayor of Darebin
Aviva Kipen		(c. 1950–)	2001	Rabbi
Maria Kirk		(1855–1928)	2001	Temperance advocate and social reformer
Joan Kirner		(1938–2015)	2001	42nd Premier of Victoria, the first woman to hold the position
Betty Kitchener		(1951–)	2011	Mental health educator who founded mental health first aid training
Leah Kloot		(1886–1962)	2001	
Emily Kngwarreye		(1910–1996)	2001	Aboriginal artist from the Utopia community in the Northern Territory. She is one of the most prominent and successful artists in the history of contemporary Indigenous Australian art
Licia Kokocinski		(1951–)	2007	Australian Labor Party member of the Victorian Legislative Council from 1988 to 1996, representing Melbourne West Province. She was the first woman from a non-English speaking background to be elected to the Victorian parliament.
Ayse Köksüz			2006	Turkish community leader
Kim Koop			2017	Mental health advocate
Ellen Koshland			2018	
Margo Koskelainen			2006	Softball umpire
Lynne Kosky		(1958–2014)	2015	Member of Parliament and government minister
Jayashri Kulkarni		(c. 1958–)	2011	Mental health researcher
Ngarla Kunoth-Monks		(1937–2022)	2001	
Louise Kurczycki		(1961–2014)	2015	Clinical nurse and researcher
Tamara Kwarteng			2020	Advocate for equitable access to effective sexual and reproductive health programs in the Pacific
Jean Laby		(1915–2008)	2009	Pioneer atmospherics physicist
Marilyn Lake		(1949–)	2006	Historian known for her work on the effects of the military and war on Australian civil society, the political history of Australian women and Australian racism including the White Australia Policy and the movement for Aboriginal and Torres Strait Islander human rights
Cuc Lam			2007	Councillor active in the migrant community
Mary Lambe		(1912–2000)	2001	Guiding and social work
Toni Lamond		(1932–2025)	2001	Cabaret singer, stage and television actor, dancer and comedian
Taryn Lane			2021	Community energy and community-led climate activist
Marcia Langton		(1951–)	2001	Leading Aboriginal scholar who holds the Foundation Chair in Australian Indigenous Studies at the University of Melbourne
Eleanor Latham		(1878–1964)	2001	Charity worker
Carmen Lawrence		(1948–)	2001	Former Premier of Western Australia and the first woman to become Premier of a State of the Commonwealth of Australia
Marion Lau			2011	Advocate for migrant women
Anna Lavelle			2022	Chair of Medicines Australia
Deborah Lawrie		(1953–)	2001	Pilot
Louisa Lawson		(1848–1920)	2001	Poet, writer, publisher, suffragist, and feminist. She was the mother of the poet and author Henry Lawson.
Betty Lawson		(1920–2008)	2003	First woman President of the Technical Teachers Association of Victoria
Judith Lazarus			2013	
Anastasia Le			2025	Social justice and economic equity
Jenifer Lee			2025	Public health and drug and alcolhol rehabilitation
Mary Lee		(1821–1909)	2001	Irish-Australian suffragist and social reformer in South Australia
Ilma Lever		(1912–2003)	2001	Founding member of Disabled Motorists Australia
Sharon Lewin		(c. 1962–)	2019	Infectious disease physician and researcher
Nancy Lewis			2025	Ophthalmologist
Pranee Liamputtong			2007	Advocate for migrant women
Celeste Liddle		(1978–)	2017	Indigenous feminist and unionist
Belle W. X. Lim			2024	Youth leader
Joan Lindros			2001	Environmentalist
Beryl Lindsay			2001	Teacher
Nicole Livingstone		(1971–)	2006	Olympic swimmer, television sports commentator, and radio presenter
Jenny Lloyd			2021	Bushfire recovery work
Lorna Lloyd-Green		(1910–2002)	2001	Obstetrician and gynecologist
Susan Lockwood		(–2009)	2005	Advocate for breast cancer survivors
Morag Loh		(1935–2019)	2008	Writer, historian and teacher
Sherene Loi			2022	Oncologist
Rafaela Lopez			2017	Historian, social researcher and advocate for refugees
Aunty Iris Lovett-Gardiner		(1926–2004)	2001	Founder of Aboriginal Community Elders Services (ACES)
Selba-Gondoza Luka			2021	Youth mental health of African-Australians
Margaret Lusink		(1922–2026)	2004	Leader in law, women's health and education
Lottie Lyell		(1890–1925)	2001	Actress, screenwriter, editor and filmmaker. Lyell is regarded as Australia's first film star, and also contributed to the local industry during the silent era with her collaborations with Raymond Longford.
Helen Lynch		(1943–)	2001	First female chief general manager of a bank in Australia
Enid Lyons		(1897–1981)	2001	First woman to be elected to the Australian House of Representatives as well as the first woman appointed to the federal Cabinet. Prior to these achievements, she was best known as the wife of the Premier of Tasmania and later Prime Minister of Australia, Joseph Lyons.
Elizabeth Macarthur		(1766–1850)	2001	The first soldier's wife to arrive in New South Wales, Macarthur held court amongst officers of the New South Wales Corps, naval officers and members of the colonial administration.
Natalie MacDonald			2020	Public sector policy reformer
Maryclare Machen			2015	Executive Officer of the Eastern Domestic Violence Service
Jean Macnamara		(1899–1968)	2001	Australian medical doctor and scientist, best known for her contributions to children's health and welfare
Jessica Macpherson			2017	
Helen Macrae			2008	Advocate for adult and community education
Judy Maddigan		(1948–)	2001	Speaker of the Victorian Legislative Assembly from 2003 to 2005. She was the member for the seat of Essendon from 1996 to 2010, representing the Australian Labor Party.
Eve Mahlab		(1937–)	2001	Co-founder and convener of the Australian Women Donors Network
Gloria Mahoney			2009	Promoter of volunteerism
Janine Mahoney			2025	Improving the safety and well-being of vulnerable and at-risk women and children
Bertha Main		(1873–1957)	2007	Co-founder of Queen Victoria Hospital
Malvina Malinek		(1937–)	2015	Women and migrant women's rights activist
Rosemary Malone			2015	Activist for the disabled and disadvantaged
Tricia Malowney			2013	
Ida Mann		(1893–1983)	2001	Ophthalmologist who diagnosed a trachoma epidemic amongst Indigenous people in the Kimberleys and traveled extensively in Western Australia in order to examine and treat Indigenous Australians.
Kerryn Manning		(1976–)	2006	Harness racer
Patti Manolis			2016	Librarianship
Helen Marcou			2017	Activist and advocate for Victorian music industry
Betty Marginson		(1923–2015)	2001	Councillor, teacher and community activist
Melba Marginson			2001	Commissioner, Filipino women's activist
Hyllus Maris		(1933–1986)	2001	
Ivy Marks			2005	Leader in the Lake Tyers Aboriginal Community
Fay Marles		(1926–2024)	2010	First Equal Opportunity Commissioner and the first woman Chancellor at the University of Melbourne
Felicity Marlowe			2019	Campaigner for the rights of diverse families and the LGBTIQ community
Carol Martin		(1957–)	2001	Member for the Western Australian Legislative Assembly seat of Kimberley for the Australian Labor Party, having first been elected to that position in 2001 following the retirement of Ernie Bridge. She was the first Aboriginal woman to be elected to any Australian Federal, State or Territory Parliament.
Sue Maslin			2018	
Bernice Masterson			2001	First Australian female assistant commissioner of police
Aunty Frances Mathyssen-Briggs		(1929–2023)	2001	Yorta Yorta elder and Aboriginal community leader
Helen Mayo		(1878–1967)	2001	Medical doctor and medical educator
Danielle Mazza			2020	Improving the lives of women, particularly the most disadvantaged, through access to better sexual and reproductive health care
Janice McCarthy			2010	Military nursing leader
Lorna McConchie		(1914–2001)	2004	Physical educator and netball administrator
Isabella McDonagh		(1899–1982)	2001	Actor
Paulette McDonagh		(1901–1978)	2001	Film director
Phyllis McDonagh		(1900–1978)	2001	Film producer and production designer
Carol McDonough			2008	Community activist
Mary McGowan			2019	Paediatric oncology nurse
Lee McIntosh			2001	
Heather McKay		(1941–)	2001	Squash player
Kristy McKellar			2017	
Florence McKenzie		(1890–1982)	2001	Australia's first female electrical engineer, founder of the Women's Emergency Signalling Corps (WESC) and lifelong promoter for technical education for women.
Shirley McKerrow		(1933–2023)	2001	
Mary MacKillop		(1842–1909)	2001	Australian nun who has been declared a saint by the Catholic Church, as St Mary of the Cross. She was a co-founder of the Sisters of St Joseph of the Sacred Heart (the Josephites), a congregation of religious sisters that established a number of schools and welfare institutions throughout Australia and New Zealand, with an emphasis on education for the rural poor.
Catriona McLean			2024	
Fiona McLeod		(1964–)	2014	Barrister
Margaret McLorinan		(1887–1932)	2002	Founder of the Obstetrics Department at the Queen Victoria Hospital
Ruth McNair			2017	
Elizabeth Grace McNeill		(1868–1946)	2020	First woman to serve in an executive role in any form of government administration in Victoria
Hilary McPhee		(1941–2026)	2001	Publisher, editor and businessperson
Doris McRae		(1893–1988)	2001	
Effie Meehan			2006	Community worker with disabled migrants
Joy Mein		(1918–2015)	2001	First female State President of a major political party in Australia
Nellie Melba		(1861–1931)	2001	Operatic soprano who became one of the most famous singers of the late Victorian Era and the early 20th century. She was the first Australian to achieve international recognition as a classical musician.
Shanleigh Meldrum			2023	Sensory disability professional and volunteer with the Victoria State Emergency Service
Jean Melzer		(1926–2013)	2006	Senator representing the Australian Labor Party and Victoria
Carmen Mendez			2023	Founder and Managing Director of More Than Support disability services agency
Valli Mendez			2009	Advocate for sex industry workers
Voula Messimeri-Kianidis			2007	Advocate for migrant women
Janet Michelmore			2013	
Maggie Millar		(1941–)	2007	Actress
Aunty Merle Miller			2022	Yorta Yorta woman, educator, community leader emotional and spiritual wellbeing support worker, and writer
Leanne Miller		(1963–)	2004	Indigenous affairs activist
Natalie Miller			2017	
Nancy Millis		(1922–2012)	2003	Microbiologist, who introduced fermentation technologies to Australia and created the first applied microbiology course taught in an Australian university.
Karen Milward			2022	Aboriginal consultant
Noreen Minogue			2001	Australian Red Cross volunteer
Anne Mitchell			2015	Community development worker and adult sexual health educator
Christina Mitchell			2015	Medical research scientist and academic leader
Elizabeth Mitchell		(1864–1948)	2001	
Heather Mitchell		(1917–1999)	2001	Farmer
Merle Mitchell		(1934–2021)	2001	
Roma Mitchell		(1913–2000)	2001	First Australian woman to be a judge, a Queen's Counsel, a chancellor of an Australian university and the Governor of an Australian state.
Vicki Mitsos			2001	
Tracey Moffatt		(1960–)	2001	Photography and video artist
Halima Mohamud			2008	Advocate for Somali women
Maureen Mohr			2025	Community of Melton
Helen Monkivitch		(1942–)	2014	RSM AO
Joan Montgomery		(1925–2024)	2004	Leading educator
Anna Moo			2017	
Eleanor Moore		(1875–1949)	2008	Pacifist and women's rights activist
Patricia Moore			2020	Women's health expert
Shorna Moore			2022	Leader in the justice, youth and homelessness sectors
Maxine Morand		(1959–)	2020	Advocate for women's rights, equality and healthcare
Barbara Morgan			2008	Surf lifesaving leader
Leonie Morgan			2001	
Edith Joyce Morgan		(1919–2004)	2005	Social and economic justice activist
Belinda Morieson		(1942–)	2001	Nursing leader and unionist
Jennifer Morris			2024	
Lorna Morris			2019	Owner/editor of Numurkah Leader
Michal Morris			2022	CEO of inTouch Multicultural Centre Against Family Violence
May Moss		(1869–1948)	2008	Suffragist, welfare worker and women's rights activist
Myrtle Muir		(1932–2009)	2002	Koori elder and community worker
Brigitte Muir		(1958–)	2001	First Australian woman to climb Everest
Josie Mullet			2005	Leader in the Lake Tyers Aboriginal Community
Elisabeth Murdoch		(1909–2012)	2001	Philanthropist; widow of newspaper publisher Sir Keith Murdoch and the mother of Rupert Murdoch
Joy Murphy			2020	Longest serving policewoman in Australasia
Aunty Joy Murphy Wandin			2001	Indigenous Australian, Senior Wurundjeri elder of the Kulin alliance in Victoria, Australia. She has given the traditional welcome to country greeting at many Melbourne events and to many distinguished visitors
Brenda Murray		(1930–)	2003	Councillor and community worker in East Gippsland
Sue Nattrass		(1941–2022)	2001	First female artistic director of the Melbourne International Arts Festival
Marcia Neave		(1944–)	2006	Justice appointed to the Supreme Court of Victoria, Court of Appeals division in 2006
Deborah Neesham			2008	Gynaecological oncologist
Judith Newnham			2001	Australian Red Cross volunteer
Cam Nguyen		(1940–)	2003	Advocate for immigrants who helped establish the Australian Vietnamese Women's Welfare Association
Vivienne Vy Nguyen		(1971–)	2002	Advocate for Vietnamese youth
Catriona Vi Nguyen-Robertson			2025	Singing scientist
Gladys Nicholls		(1908–1961)	2008	Indigenous community leader
Sandra Nicholson			2008	Victoria Police officer
Elizabeth Nissen		(1918–2016)	2001	
Christine Nixon		(1953–)	2001	Chief Commissioner of Victoria Police from 2001 to 2009
Mary Anne Noone			2010	Community and legal advocate
Oodgeroo Noonuccal		(1920–1993)	2001	Poet, political activist, artist and educator. She was also a campaigner for Aboriginal rights. Oodgeroo was best known for her poetry, and was the first Aboriginal Australian to publish a book of verse.
Ada Norris		(1901–1989)	2001	Women's rights activist and community worker. She founded the UNAA National Status of Women Network in 1974 and served as President of Australia's National Council of Women. In 1975 Norris headed the Australian International Women's Year Committee.
Casey Nunn			2019	Leader in civic responsibility and emergency services
Margaret Oates		(1909–1998)	2001	
Julie Oberin			2024	
Elizabeth O'Brien			2005	Educator of women prisoners
Ailsa O'Connor		(1921–1980)	2001	Sculptor
Deirdre O'Connor		(1941–2024)	2001	
Manjula Datta O’Connor			2024	
Margaret O'Connor			2023	Palliative care
Bridie O'Donnell		(1974–)	2021	Gender equality in sport
Lowitja O'Donoghue		(1932–2024)	2001	Aboriginal Australian retired public administrator. She was inaugural chairperson of the now dissolved Aboriginal and Torres Strait Islander Commission (ATSIC).
Robyn E. O'Hehir			2019	Allergy and asthma researcher
Marjorie Oke		(1911–2003)	2002	Social justice activist and campaigner for Indigenous rights
Nilgun Olcayoz		(1951–)	2004	Turkish community leader
Clare Oliver		(1981–2007)	2009	Journalist who campaigned to ban the use of tanning beds before dying from melanoma.
Lecki Ord			2001	Architect and the first woman to be Lord Mayor of Melbourne
Ethel Osborne		(1882–1968)	2008	Advocate for better working conditions for women
Lucy Osburn		(1836–1891)	2001	Founder of modern nursing in Australia
Pat O'Shane		(1941–)	2001	Magistrate of the Local Court of New South Wales and former head of the New South Wales Ministry of Aboriginal Affairs and Chancellor of the University of New England
Sheila O'Sullivan		(1944–)	2004	Leading public relations professional
Mary Owen		(1921–2017)	2001	Feminist and unionist; co-founder of the Working Women's Centre in Melbourne
Nettie Palmer		(1885–1964)	2001	Poet, essayist and leading literary critic
Rosetta Parisotto			2009	Advocate for women councillors and multicultural communities
Judith Parker		(1950–)	2001	Nursing education
Milly Parker			2014	
Debra Parkinson			2022	Researcher on gender and violence during disaster
Anne Parton			2023	Vice President of the National Council of Women Victoria and President of the National Council of Women Geelong
Bruna Pasqua			2007	Advocate for migrant communities
Mary Paton			2001	Co-founder of the Nursing Mothers' Association
Sharon Paton			2020	Gunai policewoman advocating for Aboriginal women
Rochelle Patten			2024	
Georgia Paxton			2016	Refugees and asylum seekers
Michelle Payne		(1985–)	2016	First woman jockey to win the Melbourne Cup
Millie Peacock		(1870–1948)	2002	First woman elected to the Parliament of Victoria
Colleen Pearce			2016	Public advocate
Muriel Peck		(1882–1947)	2001	Sister and nurse in the infant welfare movement in Victoria in the first half of the 20th century
Aunty Pam Pedersen			2018	Yorta Yorta elder
Lois Peeler			2020	Aboriginal educator
Kerryn Pennell			2021	Youth mental health advocate
Nova Peris		(1971–)	2001	Olympic athlete
Aunty Dot Peters		(1930–2019)	2011	Aboriginal elder and community leader
Cindy Pham			2023	Professor, creator of 'The Scholar Diaries' Instagram
Anushka Vandani Phal			2023	Psychologist
Anne Phelan		(1944–2019)	2008	Actress and HIV activist
Kelly-Anne Phillips			2025	Advocate for women in medical research
Linny Kimly Phuong			2025	Paediatric infectious diseases physician
Kristine Pierce			2022	Advocate for those with disability and rare diseases
Karleen Plunkett			2015	Disability rights
Ann Polis			2020	Improving justice and education in the community
Yasmin Poole			2021	Writer and youth advocate
Muriel Lylie Porter			2009	Campaigner for equality in the Anglican Church
Maureen Postma			2007	General secretary of the Victorian Council of Churches
Janet Powell		(1942–2013)	2001	Senator for Victoria, representing the Australian Democrats and later the Australian Greens
Jeanne Pratt			2001	Journalist, philanthropist, and spouse of Richard Pratt
Joyce Price		(1915–2009)	2006	Leader of Girl Guides Australia and the World Association of Girl Guides and Girl Scouts (WAGGGS).
Thelma Prior		(1922–2012)	2003	Union leader and advocate for women's rights
Susan Provan			2017	Director of the Melbourne International Comedy Festival
Wendy Poussard			2011	International development worker
Tara Rajkumar		(1948–)	2001	
Asha Rao			2021	Advocate for gender equality in mathematical sciences
Margaret Ray		(1933–2017)	2009	Social justice advocate
Dorothy Jean Reading		(–2019)	2020	Cancer control and prevention activities in Victoria, Australia, and globally
Fanny Reading		(1884–1974)	2010	Social justice activist
Dimity Reed		(1942–)	2003	Architect and promoter of public housing and urban design
Mary Reibey		(1777–1855)	2001	Englishwoman who was transported to Australia as a convict but went on to become a successful businesswoman in Sydney
Jill Reichstein			2001	
Belle Reid		(1883–1945)	2007	Pioneer veterinary surgeon
Elizabeth Anne Reid		(1942–)	2001	Development practitioner, feminist and academic with a distinguished career in and significant contribution to national and international public service. She founded, established and worked with a number of pioneering and specialised United Nations institutions, government agencies and non-governmental organisations. Reid was appointed the world's first advisor on women's affairs to a head of state by the Australian Labor Government of Gough Whitlam in 1973.
Margaret Reid		(1935–)	2001	First woman to be President of the Australian Senate
Marilyn Renfree		(1947–)	2019	Zoologist and conservationist
Irene Renzenbrink			2001	Founding member of the National Association for Loss and Grief
Brenda Richards			2011	Founding member of the Council of Single Mothers and their Children
Fay Patricia Richards			2016	Disabilities
Ethel Richardson		(1870–1946)	2001	
Ngardarb Francine Riches		(1964–2024)	2015	Bardi artist
Bessie Rischbieth		(1874–1967)	2001	Influential and early Australian feminist and social activist. A leading or founding member of many social reform groups, such as the Women's Service Guilds, the Australian Federation of Women Voters and their periodical The Dawn, Rischbieth sought to establish international campaigns for social change and human rights.
Debra Robertson			2022	Commander in charge of Intel Covert Support Command at Victoria Police
Mavis Robertson		(1930–2015)	2001	
Irene Robins		(1916–2000)	2001	
Ute Roessner		(1971–)	2020	Professor researching metabolomics
Mary Catherine Rogers		(1872–1932)	2001	Community and political worker
Wendy Rose			2012	Co-founder and first President of the International Women's Development Agency
Doreen Rosenthal		(1938–)	2007	Researcher into sexuality and reproductive health
Melodie Potts Rosevear			2020	Working to overcome educational disadvantage
Coral Ross			2019	Mayor Emeritus of Boroondara Council
Dominica Rossi		(1937–2011)	2001	
Jane Rowe			2012	Advocate for vulnerable children and founder of the Mirabel Foundation
Marilyn Rowe		(1946–)	2001	First graduate of the Australian Ballet School to be appointed its director, in 1999
Janice Rowley			2020	Advocate for human rights of people with disabilities
Nicola Roxon		(1967–)	2014	Former Attorney-General of Australia and member of the Australian House of Representatives representing the seat of Gellibrand
Ana Rufatt-Ruiz			2025	Public housing advocate
Jodie Ryan		(1975–)	2003	Indigenous leader
Shabnam Safa			2021	Afghan Hazara refugee; supporter of refugees
Nouria Salehi			2021	Nuclear physicist and biophysicist in Afghanistan and Australia
Mary Salce			2001	Dairy farmer involved in agricultural politics
Shirley Neta Sampson		(1927–2007)	2009	Pioneer in girls' education
Liberty Sanger			2019	Advocate and change agent for gender equality, women's rights and social justice
Louisa Angelina Santospirito		(1895–1983)	2001	
Val Sarah			2006	First female announcer on BTV6 in Ballarat
Delys Sargeant		(1927–2017)	2012	Educator, medical scientist, and advocate for human rights
Louise Sauvage		(1973–)	2001	Paralympic wheelchair racer
Susan Sawyer			2013	
Vera Scantlebury Brown		(1889–1946)	2001	Medical practitioner and pediatrician
Jane Scarlett		(1940–2010)	2011	Teacher and leader with Girl Guides and the Salvation Army
Carol Schwartz		(1955–)	2011	Businesswoman, board member and community advocate
Evelyn Scott		(1935–2017)	2001	Chair of the National Council for Aboriginal Reconciliation and advocate for Indigenous Australians
Joan Scott			2019	Advocate for people with disability or mental illness in the Victorian justice system
Margaret Scott		(1922–2019)	2001	South African-born dancer who participated in the negotiations with the Australian Elizabethan Theatre Trust that led to the formation of The Australian Ballet in 1962. Scott was appointed director of the Australian Ballet School in 1964, heading the school until 1990.
Vicki Scott			2025	Goulburn Valley Health Foundation Ambassador and cancer fundraiser
Jocelynne Scutt		(1947–)	2001	Feminist lawyer, writer and commentator
Peta Searle			2017	
Lorraine Sellings			2005	Leader in the Lake Tyers Aboriginal Community
Frances Separovic		(c. 1954–)	2018	Change agent
Kay Setches		(1944–)	2001	
Hannah Mary Helen Sexton		(1863–1950)	2007	Co-founder of Queen Victoria Hospital
Anne Sgro			2005	Community activist
Anjali Sharma		(2004–)	2022	Climate activist
Sylvie Shaw			2001	Co-founder of the Working Women's Centre in Melbourne
Leonie Sheedy			2020	CEO and co-founder of Care Leavers Australasia Network (CLAN)
Michelle Sheppard			2023	Gender equity advocate
Una Shergold			2001	Pioneer in women and children's health
Sunila Shrivastava			2021	Leader of Indian community
Rien Silverstein			2008	Advocate for rural women
Virginia Simmons			2011	Advocate for vocational education
Diane Sisely			2011	Chief Executive and Conciliator of the Victorian Equal Opportunity Commission
Judy Small			2024	
Dalal Smiley			2024	
Ann Smith			2022	Head of the Victorian Aged Care Response Centre, established the Prevention Outbreak Plan Improvement Program
Fiona Smith			2012	Public interest lawyer and Chair of the Victorian Equal Opportunity Commission from 2003 to 2008
Helen Smith		(1953–)	2010	Olympic fencing champion and first Australian woman to become a qualified Fencing Master at Arms
Jill Smith		(1948–)	2003	Theatre administrator at the Playbox Theatre
Catherine Helen Spence		(1825–1910)	2001	Author, teacher, journalist, politician and leading suffragette
Nancy Spence			2001	
Melinda Spencer			2020	Advocate for people with autism
Faye Spiteri			2019	Advocate for human rights and gender equity
Fleur Spitzer			2004	Philanthropist and feminist
Aunty Maria Starcevic		(1933–2011)	2010	Advocate for Indigenous communities
Cathie Steele			2023	Improving food security for regional communities
Wendy Steendam			2017	
Sarah Stegley		(1951–)	2001	Founder of Women in Philanthropy
Anna Stewart		(1947–1983)	2001	Trade union official and pioneering advocate for women's rights in labour law
Nellie Stewart		(1858–1931)	2001	Actress and singer, known as "Our Nell" and "Sweet Nell"
Fay Stewart-Muir			2020	Aboriginal Elder and Boon Wurrung language educator
Lilian Stojanovska		(1952–)	2004	Macedonian community leader and international educator
Emily Mary Page Stone		(1865–1910)	2007	Co-founder of Queen Victoria Hospital
Grace Clara Stone		(1860–1957)	2007	Co-founder of Queen Victoria Hospital
Constance Stone		(1856–1902)	2001	First woman to practice medicine in Australia. Stone played an important role in founding the Queen Victoria Hospital in Melbourne
Cecile Storey		(1933–1997)	2004	Feminist, human rights and equal opportunity campaigner
Jessie Street		(1889–1970)	2001	Suffragette, feminist and human rights campaigner
Shirley Strickland		(1925–2004)	2001	Athlete who won more Olympic medals than any other Australian in running sports
Maha Sukkar			2018	
Anne Summers		(1945–)	2001	Writer, columnist, feminist, editor and publisher. She was formerly Australia's First Assistant Secretary of the Office of the Status of Women.
Selina Sutherland		(1839–1909)	2010	Social justice activist and advocate for neglected children
Lyn Swinburne		(1952–)	2002	Women's advocate, inspirational speaker and founder of Breast Cancer Network Australia (BCNA)
Dorothy Tangney		(1911–1985)	2001	Politician and the first woman member of the Australian Senate
Collette Tayler		(1951–2017)	2018	Contribution to early childhood education
Bronwyn Taylor		(1962–2005)	2004	Pre-school teacher and community volunteer
Jean Taylor		(1944–)	2002	Feminist and lesbian activist
Mavis Taylor		(1915–2007)	2003	Humanitarian who worked for the people of East Timor
Gwynnyth Taylor		(1915–1998)	2001	Conservationist
Florence Taylor		(1879–1969)	2001	First qualified female architect and the first woman to train as an engineer in Australia
Helena Teede			2012	Professor and community health advocate
Judy Tegart-Dalton		(1937–)	2019	Advocate for the advancement of female tennis players
Katherine Teh-White			2003	Campaigner against sexual harassment
Michelle Telfer		(1974–)	2022	Paediatrician and adolescent medicine physician
Eymard Temby			2001	
Ethel Mary Temby		(1914–2012)	2001	
Wai-Hong Tham			2023	Malaria and infectious disease specialist
Doreen Thomas			2019	Academic and advocate for women in engineering and mathematics
Trang Thomas			2005	Advocate for migrant health
Freda Thompson		(1909–1980)	2001	Pioneer aviator and the first Australian woman to fly solo from the United Kingdom to Australia
Linda Thompson			2022	Artistic director, producer, stage director and soprano
Christine Tippett			2017	Obstetrician and gynaecologist improving maternal health, founder Monash Health Maternal Fetal Medicine Unit
Jean Tom		(1922–2017)	2001	
Pauline Toner		(1935–1989)	2001	First female cabinet minister in the Parliament of Victoria
Ann Tonks			2013	Arts Management practitioner, academic and consultant
Patricia Toop			2016	Workers' rights
Thanh-Kham Tran-Dang			2020	Australian-Vietnamese community worker
Gaye Tripodi			2012	Horticulture industry leader
Judith Troeth		(1940–)	2012	Member of the Australian Senate
Kim Thien Truong			2020	Advocate for multiculturalism, the environment and prevention of violence against women
Lalisha Thapa			2023	Vice President of the Nepalese Association of Victoria and establisher of the NAV Women's Forum
Marge Tucker		(1904–1996)	2001	Indigenous activist and writer
Betul Tuna			2023	Executive Officer of Point of Difference Studio
Elizabeth Turnbull		(1920–2018)	2001	
Elda Vaccari		(1912–2007)	2001	Italian community figure
Jessie Vasey		(1897–1966)	2001	Founder and President of the War Widows' Guild of Australia. Honoured in 2001 and 2008.
Peggy van Praagh		(1910–1990)	2011	Ballet dancer, choreographer, teacher, repetiteur, producer, advocate and director
Marisa Vedar			2021	Filipino community leader, working on bushfire and COVID-19 pandemic relief
Svetha Venkatesh			2018	
Claire Vickery			2005	Campaigner against eating disorders
Aunty Joan Agnes Vickery			2016	Gunditjmara elder, Aboriginal health
Hong Vo		(1957–)	2001	Vietnamese Australian social worker from Melbourne and member of pro-democracy organization Viet Tan who was arrested in Ho Chi Minh City in Vietnam in 2010 for participating in a peaceful political demonstration in Hanoi, Vietnam affirming Vietnam's sovereignty over the Paracel and Spratly islands
Beverley Vollenhoven			2019	Reproductive endocrinologist and infertility specialist
Kay Vrieze			2007	Counsellor for Nursing Mothers Australia and community worker in Narre Warren
Manasi Wagh			2023	Financial literacy
Joanne Wainer		(1946–)	2002	Health activist
Noel Waite			2001	
Sally Ann Walker			2014	
Jude Wallace			2001	
Therese Walsh		(1971/1972–)	2013	
Sylvia Walton		(1941–2024)	2014	
Lyn Warren			2019	Aboriginal Elder and cultural awareness educator
Gai Waterhouse		(1954–)	2001	Horse trainer, businesswoman and former actress
Kathryn Watt		(1964–)	2019	Racing cyclist and photographer
Betty Watson		(–2022)	2006	Olympic basketball player
Kathleen Watson			2013	
Kaele Way			2007	City of Whitehorse Councillor and proponent of local governance
Ivy Weber		(1892–1976)	2001	First woman elected at a general election in Victoria and the first non-major party woman in Australia to win a seat
Rachel Webster		(1951–)	2010	Astrophysicist and researcher on climate change and alternative energy
Ellen Weeks			2001	Councillor
Wendy Weeks		(1943–2004)	2005	Women's rights activist
Christine Welsh			2022	Unit controller of Victorian State Emergency Service Seymour Unit
Eva West		(1888–1969)	2018	
Janet Whiting			2015	Corporate lawyer and not-for-profit director
Jennifer Wills			2008	Fitzroy City Councillor and advocate of social planning
Beth Wilson			2008	Victoria's Health Services Commissioner
Jan Wilson		(1939–2010)	2017	Politician, chairman of Greyhound Racing Victoria, and animal welfare activist
Linzi Wilson-Wilde			2014	
E. Marelyn Wintour-Coghlan			2014	Physiologist who has focused her career on the endocrinology of the pregnant mother and foetus
Margaret Wirrpanda		(1936–2013)	2003	Advocate for Indigenous Australians
Carolyn Worth			2012	Social justice advocate and campaigner for victims of sexual assault
Diane Wright			2013	
Aunty Wilma Xiberras		(1942–2015)	2001	Wurundjeri elder
Jun Yang			2024	
Aunty Bessie Yarram		(1938–)	2008	Indigenous leader
Barbara Yeoh			2015	
Dianne Yerbury		(1941–)	2001	Academic and university administrator. Yerbury was the Vice-Chancellor of Macquarie University from 1987 to 2005.
Hatice Yilmaz			2022	
Simone Young		(1961–)	2001	Conductor
Stella Young		(1982–2014)	2017	Disability rights activist
Wilma Young		(1916–2001)	2001	Nurse with the Australian Army during World War II
Panagiota Zacharias		(1940–)	2002	Volunteer in the Greek community
Hnin Yee Htun Win			2022	Burmese entrepreneur and activist

== See also ==
- List of awards honoring women
