= Eve Mahlab =

Australian activist

Eve Mahlab AO is an Australian businesswoman, philanthropist and advocate for women's rights.

== Early life ==
Eve Mahlab was born in Vienna, Austria, on 30 May 1937, the only child of Robert Dickstein (later Anglicized to Dickins) and Gertrud (Trudy). Her maternal grandfather, Arthur Albers, was a leading businessman and a 'towering figure' in her family. In the following year, Austria was annexed by Nazi Germany. The family lost their home and business and lived in hiding after the release of Eve's father and Arthur Albers from a detention centre. Mahlab's earliest memories were 'feelings of fear and apprehension'. She was also left with a 'tremendous feeling of opposition to oppression'. The family escaped Austria and migrated to Melbourne, Australia, in 1939. In 1946 they moved to New York to join Trudy's parents, but returned to Australia in the following year. Robert Dickins purchased a controlling interest in the soft drink manufacturing company, Ecks, while Trudy worked as a real estate agent. Mahlab was educated at Korowa Anglican Girls School, Methodist Ladies College, and the University of Melbourne, graduating with a Bachelor of Laws in March 1958.

== Career and family life ==
Admitted as a barrister and solicitor in 1959, Mahlab served her articles year in the family law practice of Norman Landau. On 19 December 1959 she married Frank Mahlab, an American business executive temporarily based in Sydney, where she worked as a solicitor in the Public Solicitor's Office. Shortly before the birth of their first child, the Mahlabs returned to Melbourne. Between 1961 and 1964 Mahlab had three children, Karen, Bobbi and Ken, and continued to work from home, as a family law solicitor. She found it extremely difficult to work effectively while caring for young children and met other women facing the same dilemma.

== Mahlab Recruitment ==
In 1968 Mahlab founded Mahlab Recruitment, initially designed to assist women looking for part-time legal work, the firm 'was the first vehicle which actively promoted and facilitated women's entry and retention in the legal workforce'. The business expanded, becoming the Mahlab Group of Companies, which published legal diaries and directories, including a directory of women 'in a business, profession or management in Australia.' and provided a legal costings service, which could be done by women lawyers working from home. In 1974 Mahlab criticized gender specific recruitment advertisements in the Victorian Law Institute Journal. Writing in the Journal, she stated that 'We refuse to indulge in sexist advertising', which she described as an 'inefficient' method of finding the right person for a position, and which was 'also discriminatory in the same way that racist advertising is discriminatory'. Mahlab pointed out that 'It is particularly unfitting that a profession devoted to justice should appear to be denying equality of opportunity to its own members.'

== Feminism and the Women's Electoral Lobby ==
Mahlab's work in family law 'raised … my feminist consciousness very much', she saw how women were 'enormously disadvantaged' legally and economically. In 1973 she attended a meeting of the Women's Electoral Lobby (WEL) after which she felt 'I've found my home.' Mahlab was involved in redrafting WEL's constitution, and on behalf of WEL, lobbied Attorney General Lionel Murphy over the drafting of the Family Law Act 1975, which introduced no-fault divorce. In 1973, during the Victorian state election campaign, Mahlab, with other WEL members, designed a WEL forum at Dallas Brooks Hall, chaired by Mahlab, where the leaders of the major parties, including Rupert Hamer and Clyde Holding, addressed an audience of two thousand women and a few men, and responded to questions 'on childcare, abortion, equal pay and contraception.' The forum was televised by Channel Seven, which purchased the broadcasting rights. Articulate and energetic, Mahlab was 'willing to take on the task of being an advocate' and became a media spokeswoman of WEL during the 1970s, years during which WEL 'achieved many social and economic gains for women.' In 1975 Mahlab was appointed to the Victorian Government Committee of Inquiry into the Status of Women, whose work resulted in the Victorian Equal Opportunity Act 1976. In the same year, she was the first woman elected to the Monash University Council (1975-81). During the 1970s Mahlab unsuccessfully contested three Liberal party preselections for federal and state seats. In 1981 she co-founded (with Julie McPhee) the ultimately unsuccessful Liberal Feminist Network within the Victorian Liberal Party. In December 1979, Mahlab played a central role in organizing the defeat of right-wing groups at elections for Victorian delegates to the National Women's Advisory Council Conference in the lead-up to the Second United Nations World Conference on Women, to be held in Copenhagen in July 1980. Mahlab attended the World Conference as an independent WEL observer, participating in forums that 'unlike the government conference' were 'stimulating, diverse and positive.'

== Public life and business ==
By the 1980s Mahlab was less involved with WEL, but her speaking career advanced, as did her involvement in various public activities. In 1982 she was named Qantas-Bulletin Australian Businesswoman of the Year. Mahlab's acceptance speech emphasized the importance of childcare to working women. In the same year, she co-founded, Sydney's Carols in the Domain.

In 1983 Mahlab initiated 'Know Biz., a long-running business education project by which school students and their teachers visited businesses throughout Victoria. In the same year, Mahlab helped establish, with Noel Waite, an Australian branch of Femmes Chefs Enterprises (Women Chiefs of Enterprise). Appointed to the newly established State Training Board of Victoria in 1988, Mahlab served until 1994, and was chair of the board's Access and Equity Committee.

Mahlab retired from day-to-day involvement in the Mahlab Group in 1987, which she sold in 1989, and which was subsequently sold to the present owners who have retained the Mahlab name. In 1988 Mahlab was honoured by appointment as an Officer of the Order of Australia (AO) for service to business, to government and the community, particularly to women. In 1997, she received an Honorary Doctorate in Law from Monash University for her contributions to the university and to law. Mahlab was the first woman to join the Board of the Walter and Eliza Institute of Medical Research (1990-2002). She and her husband provided the initial funding for the Institute's Eve Mahlab Blue Sky Awards for Research, established in 2020. Mahlab was a member of Victoria's Jewish Commission for the Future from 1991 to 1994. In 1992 Mahlab was the executive producer and fundraiser for an SBS documentary on women and leadership, Not a Bedroom War. Co-produced by Anne Deveson, the film included interviews with Mary Robinson, Anne Summers, Bella Abzug and Betty Friedan. A board member of Open Channel, a community-based Victorian filmmaking hub, Mahlab accepted an offer to join the board of Film Australia, serving as deputy chair (1998-2004). In October 1993 Mahlab became the first woman elected to the board of the Westpac Bank, serving until 2002, and was a member of the bank's Credit and Market Risk committee. In 1995, as a board member of Westpac, she attended the Fourth United Nations World Conference on Women, held in Beijing.

== 2000s ==
In 1994 Mahlab said that there was 'such a balance' in her life that 'everything I'm doing I am enjoying … You want it to go on forever.' That positive energy was maintained in the 2000s Chair of Philanthropy Australia in 1999-2000. She was inducted into the Victorian Honour Roll of Women in 2001. In 2007 Mahlab attended a conference of the Women's Funding Network in the USA, which 'crystallised in my mind the need for more funding for women's organisations and women's projects.' Mahlab viewed the advance of female philanthropy as 'the third wave of the women's movement', which 'will see the financial empowerment of women.'

In 2007, together with Jill Reichstein, Mahlab founded the Australian Women Donors Network (since 2020 known as Australians Investing in Women). The organization does not itself raise funds or distribute grants: its purpose is to 'develop women as donors' and to apply a gender lens to philanthropy, 'to make the case for giving to women and girls', whose needs might not be met by mainstream charities. To encourage the gender-lens approach to giving, in 2020 Australians Investing in Women established the Eve Mahlab AO Gender-wise Philanthropy Award. Mahlab chaired the Women Donor's Network from 2009 to 2015. She was prescient in anticipating the rising power of Australian superannuation funds, in 1994 urging that women 'claim their places as trustees' of those funds.

Throughout her public life, Mahlab has published opinion pieces in major newspapers, as well as frequent 'letters to the editor'. In 2012 she spoke out 'against the misogyny being demonstrated so viciously against our first woman prime minister', Julia Gillard. Mahlab's contribution to Australian life was noted in Josh Frydenberg's documentary. 'Never Again, The Fight against Anti-Semitism', which screened in May 2024. Mahlab considers her primary role to be that of an 'advocate for building a better world through women and girls', 'giving voice to a group of people, namely women, who don't have a voice, or not enough voice'. She says that her commitment to it derives from the fact that half of the world's population 'are the most promising yet undeveloped resource in the world'.
