= Nina Bassat =

Leader in the Victorian Jewish community

Nina Bassat AM
- Born: 1939 (age 86–87); Lwowiec
- Known for: Holocaust survivor
- Notable work: Jewish Community Council of Victoria
- Awards: Victorian Honour Roll of Women

Janina "Nina" Bassat AM (born 1939) is a leader in the Victorian Jewish community. She served as president of the Jewish Community Council of Victoria (JCCV) between 1996 and 1998. Then she was again president for three years before retiring again in 2014. She has also served as president of the Executive Council of Australian Jewry (ECAJ) between 1999 and 2001.

== Biography ==
Bassat was born in Lwow, Poland. Bassat is a survivor of the Holocaust. She and her mother went to Melbourne, Australia in 1949 after living in a "displaced person's camp in Germany." She attended the University of Melbourne, studying law and graduating in 1965. Bassat started her own law practice in 1980.

During her time as president of JCCV she provided welcome support for LGBT Jews in Victoria. She also set up a National Restitution Hotline as president of the ECAJ for survivors of the Holocaust in order to facilitate restitution claims. She has also been involved in "resettling Jews from the former Soviet Union."

Bassat was inducted in the Victorian Honour Roll of Women in 2003. In 2004, she was made a Member of the Order of Australia in recognition of her services as an executive member of "peak Jewish organisations and through the promotion of greater community understanding." In 2009, she received the JCCV General Sir John Monash Award for her "outstanding service to the Victorian Jewish community."
