= Selina Sutherland =

New Zealand nurse and social worker

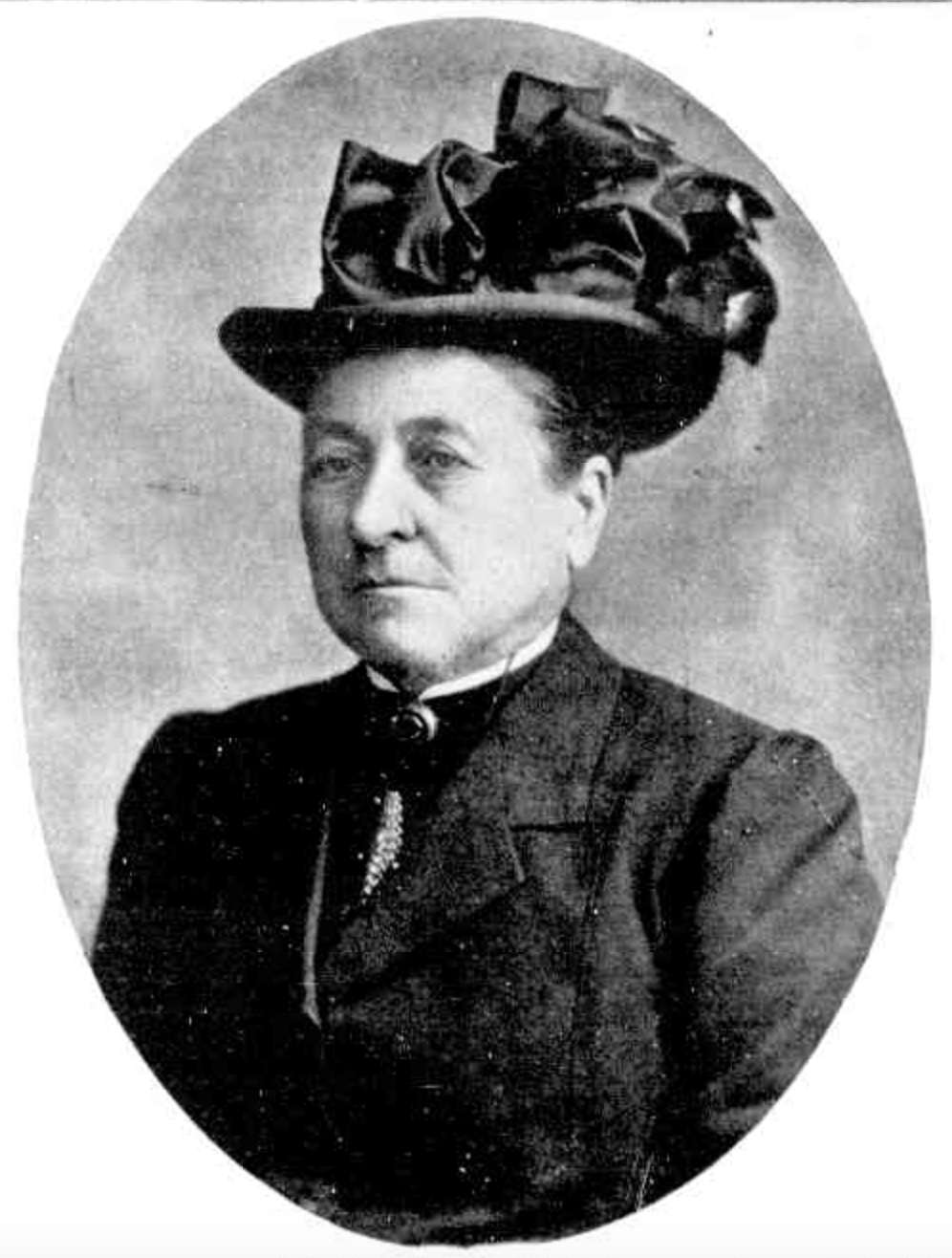
Selina Sutherland

Selina Murray McDonald Sutherland (26 December 1839 – 8 October 1909) was a New Zealand nurse and social worker. She was born in Culgower, Sutherlandshire, Scotland in 1839. She came to New Zealand in 1865 and went to visit her sister Margaret Grant in Gladstone in the Wairarapa. Trained in medicine she helped many people during their illness. The central Wairarapa had neither doctor nor hospital.

Sutherland was the driving force behind the establishment of the hospital in Masterton in 1879. She raised the funds to build a 20-bed facility and collected most of the money herself. In the same year she became matron at Wellington Hospital but left in the following year after disputes with management.

She lived in Melbourne, Australia, after 1881 and devoted herself to the care of destitute children and the arrangement of foster homes. Sutherland initiated the Neglected Children's Aid Society later obtaining the support of the Presbyterian Church. Ultimately the Victorian Neglected Children's Aid Society was formed. The Sutherland Home in Parkville was named after her. She died in Melbourne in 1909 from pleurisy and pneumonia. She is commemorated in Wairarapa Hospital by a memorial tablet.

Sutherland was inducted onto the Victorian Honour Roll of Women in 2010.

== Selina Sutherland Hospital ==
Established in 1996 Selina Sutherland Hospital is a private hospital run by a not-for-profit charitable trust. It was provided with its own building within the new Masterton Public Hospital’s complex completed in 2006. Inpatient services include orthopaedic surgery, ophthalmology and gynaecology. In 2025 it was announced that a new hospital would be redeveloped on its own site close to Wairarapa Hospital.
