= Ada Cheung =

Australian gender studies scholar

Professorial Research Fellow Ada Cheung PhD
- Education: University of Melbourne (MBBS); University of Melbourne (PhD)
- Scientific career
- Fields: Transgender studies
- Institutions: University of Melbourne; Austin Hospital

Ada Cheung is an Australian clinical scientist, endocrinologist and researcher who is known for her research in transgender studies.

She holds both a NHMRC and Dame Kate Campbell Research fellowship as a principal research fellow at the University of Melbourne and works as a clinician scientist and endocrinologist at Austin Hospital in Melbourne.

== Education and career ==
Cheung earned a MBBS (Hons) in 2003, and a PhD in 2017 at the University of Melbourne.

Prior to completing her PhD, together with Jeffrey Zajac, Cheung established a clinic in 2016 to serve trans and gender-diverse people.

After completing her degree in 2017, she established the Trans Health Research group at the University of Melbourne to improve the "health and wellbeing of trans and gender-diverse communities". Through the research led at the Trans Health Research group, she was able to help secure government funding for two trans health clinics and a state-wide training program for health professionals. Cheung promotes an informed consent approach to gender-affirming care and through her work has helped inform national guidelines in Australia on gender-affirming hormone therapy for transgender patients.

Cheung served as a board member on the Endocrine Society of Australia Council 2020 - 2024. She also serves as a member of the Committee on Diversity and Inclusion (CoDI) at the international Endocrine Society.

Cheung is an associate editor of the International Journal of Transgender Health. She is also a member of the editorial board of the Journal of Clinical Endocrinology & Metabolism, as well as a member of the editorial board of the journal on Therapeutic Advances in Endocrinology and Metabolism.

Cheung has been a guest on various medical podcasts. In 2019 she appeared on the Medical Journal of Australia podcast where she explained the new national guidelines on gender affirming care she helped co-author. In 2020, Cheung appeared as a guest on the podcast MDQueer on the topic of gender-affirming hormone therapy. In November 2023, she appeared on the Australian podcast The Latest in LGBTIQ+ Health and Policy. In June 2024, Cheung appeared as a guest on the podcast Science Vs on the topic of Trans Kids’ Healthcare: Are We Getting It Wrong? alongside Professor Stephen Russell and Dr Cal Horton.

== Awards and recognition ==
- In 2017, Cheung earned the Early Investigators Award by the Endocrine Society.
- In 2020, she earned the Dame Kate Campbell Research Fellowship.
- In 2021, she was named the GLOBE Ally of the year.
- In 2021, she received a Strategic Grant for Outstanding Women by the University of Melbourne, recognizing her contributions in transgender research and for being "pivotal in developing new national guidelines in the hormonal management of trans and gender diverse individual".
- In 2022, she was awarded the University of Melbourne Faculty of Medicine, Dentistry and Health Sciences Staff Excellence Award in Engagement for Public Value.
- In 2023, she received an Allen Institute Distinguished Investigator Award in Sex Hormones.
- In 2024, she was named one of 50 remarkable and inspirational women in Australian science by Cosmos Magazine.
- In 2024, she was awarded the Endocrine Society of Australia Mid-Career Award.
- In 2024, she was inducted onto the Victorian Honour Roll of Women.
- In 2025, she was awarded the Victorian Young Tall Poppy Scientist of the Year by the Australian Institute of Policy and Science.

== Bibliography ==
Cheung has published a large number of highly cited research papers in peer-reviewed journals during her career. Some select articles:

- Riggs, Damien W.; Lowik, A.J.; Javellana Restar, Arjee; Everhart, Avery; Lett, Elle; Cheung, Ada S.; Arora, Manvi; Treharne, Gareth J.; Rosenberg, Shoshana (2024). "Ensuring an inclusive, trans-led future for the field of trans health". International Journal of Transgender Health: 1–4. doi:10.1080/26895269.2024.2370607. PMC 11500522.
- Cheung, Ada S.; Zwickl, Sav; Miller, Kirsti; Nolan, Brendan J.; Wong, Alex Fang Qi; Jones, Patrice; Eynon, Nir (2023). "The Impact of Gender-Affirming Hormone Therapy on Physical Performance". The Journal of Clinical Endocrinology & Metabolism. 109 (2): e455 – e465. doi:10.1210/clinem/dgad414. PMC 10795902. PMID 37437247.
- van Leerdam, Taylah R.; Zajac, Jeffrey D.; Cheung, Ada S. (2023). "The Effect of Gender-Affirming Hormones on Gender Dysphoria, Quality of Life, and Psychological Functioning in Transgender Individuals: A Systematic Review". Transgender Health. 8 (1): 6–21. doi:10.1089/trgh.2020.0094. PMC 9991433. PMID 36895312.
- Zwickl, Sav; Wong, Alex Fang Qi; Dowers, Eden; Leemaqz, Shalem Yiner-Lee; Bretherton, Ingrid; Cook, Teddy; Zajac, Jeffrey D.; Yip, Paul S. F.; Cheung, Ada S. (2021). "Factors associated with suicide attempts among Australian transgender adults". BMC Psychiatry. 21 (1): 81. doi:10.1186/s12888-021-03084-7. PMC 7869522. PMID 33557793.
- Shepherd, Rebecca; Cheung, Ada S.; Pang, Ken; Saffery, Richard; Novakovic, Boris (2021). "Sexual Dimorphism in Innate Immunity: The Role of Sex Hormones and Epigenetics". Frontiers in Immunology. 11. doi:10.3389/fimmu.2020.604000. PMC 7873844. PMID 33584674.
- Cheung, Ada S.; Leemaqz, Shalem Y.; Wong, John W. P.; Chew, Denise; Ooi, Olivia; Cundill, Pauline; Silberstein, Nicholas; Locke, Peter; Zwickl, Sav; Grayson, Ren; Zajac, Jeffrey D.; Pang, Ken C. (2020). "Non-Binary and Binary Gender Identity in Australian Trans and Gender Diverse Individuals". Archives of Sexual Behavior. 49 (7): 2673–2681. doi:10.1007/s10508-020-01689-9. PMID 32285311.
- Thrower, Emily; Bretherton, Ingrid; Pang, Ken C.; Zajac, Jeffrey D.; Cheung, Ada S. (2019). "Prevalence of Autism Spectrum Disorder and Attention-Deficit Hyperactivity Disorder Amongst Individuals with Gender Dysphoria: A Systematic Review". Journal of Autism and Developmental Disorders. 50 (3): 695–706. doi:10.1007/s10803-019-04298-1. PMID 31732891.
- Cheung, Ada S.; Wynne, Katie; Erasmus, Jaco; Murray, Sally; Zajac, Jeffrey D. (2019). "Position statement on the hormonal management of adult transgender and gender diverse individuals". Medical Journal of Australia. 211 (3): 127–133. doi:10.5694/mja2.50259. PMID 31271465.
- Cheung, Ada S.; Ooi, Olivia; Leemaqz, Shalem; Cundill, Pauline; Silberstein, Nicholas; Bretherton, Ingrid; Thrower, Emily; Locke, Peter; Grossmann, Mathis; Zajac, Jeffrey D. (2018). "Sociodemographic and Clinical Characteristics of Transgender Adults in Australia". Transgender Health. 3 (1): 229–238. doi:10.1089/trgh.2018.0019. PMC 6308273. PMID 30596151.
