= Asha Rao =

Mathematician, cybersecurity expert and advocate for gender equality

Asha Rao is a mathematician and expert in cyber security. She is the Associate Dean, or Head of Department, of Mathematical Sciences and Professor at RMIT University.

== Education and career ==
Rao completed her PhD in Algebra at the University of Pune. She started working at RMIT University as a lecturer in 1992, and became a Professor in 2016.

Her higher education teaching and curriculum design in mathematics and cybersecurity, as well as her trans-disciplinary research expertise applying mathematics have been used to solve real world problems for a range of industry partners including the Department of Defence. Professor Rao is the Founding Chair of Women In Mathematics and her leadership and advocacy for women in STEM has been recognised by the award of RMIT STEM Athena Swan Award.

One facet of her research focuses on the mathematical foundations of quantum cryptography, coding theory, and risk management. This involves utilizing algebraic methods in the realms of communication, coding, and information theory, as well as employing risk management strategies to ensure adherence to regulations, such as the Anti-Money Laundering and Counter Terrorism Act.

Rao has authored more than 60 refereed scientific publications and contributed chapters to two scholarly books.

== Media ==
Highlights include influential academic contributions in the cyber security space as well as science communication outreach advocating for the importance of mathematics in high profile media platforms such as the Australian Financial Review and The Conversation.

Rao has published on the use of signatures, PINs and credit card fraud in 2014, for The Conversation. Rao has contributed to numerous podcasts, discussing cybersecurity, mathematics and physics.

Rao has been interviewed by SAARI for National Science Week, Women’s Agenda, ACEMS, and provided expert commentary on cybercrime in the ABC News.

During the latter part of 2020, she undertook the position of Interim Director at the Australian Mathematical Sciences Institute (AMSI) while concurrently holding the position of Associate Dean. AMSI serves as the collaborative effort of 14 Australian universities and serves as the leading organization advocating for mathematics in Australia.

== Gender ==
Rao has worked to address gender-related challenges that hinder the advancement of women and girls in STEM professions. In her role as the inaugural leader of Women in Maths, she has spearheaded various programs aimed at enhancing gender equality in the field of mathematical sciences in Australia. She remains an advocate for encouraging young women to pursue mathematics, actively engaging in discussions about this imperative through both conventional media and social platforms.

== Awards and recognition ==
Rao has been recognised by numerous awards including:

2021 Australia India Science, Research & Development Award, India and Australia Business and Community Alliance

2021 Victorian Honour Roll of Women Trailblazer

2019 Superstars of STEM, Science and Technology Australia

2016 RMIT Media Stars Award
