= Anjali Sharma (climate activist) =

Climate activist & legal change maker

- Born: 2004 (age 21–22); Delhi, India
- Occupation: Climate activist

Anjali Sharma (born 2004) is an Australian climate activist who was the lead litigant in a class action in the Australian Federal Court, seeking an injunction against the Australian Government and the Minister for the Environment for failing to consider the impacts of climate change when approving a coal mining permit. While no injunction was issued, the principle that the government had a duty of care to prevent certain impacts was established. The government appealed against this part of the ruling and won. Sharma was a finalist in the 2021 Children's Climate Prize, an international prize for climate activism, based in Sweden.

== Climate activism ==
Sharma, as a high school student, took the Australian Government and Minister for the Environment (then Sussan Ley), to the Federal Court of Australia in a class action. She was the lead litigant in Sharma and others vs Minister for the Environment, together with seven other school students, and a nun, Sister Marie Brigid Arthur. The class action asked the court to stop Minister from approving expansion of the Vickery coal mine, near Gunnedah, in NSW. The court ruled, in a world first, that the minister has a duty of care towards teenagers and children, with respect to climate change impacts, and in particular bushfire and heatwave. During the case, the science of climate change, and in particular that human emissions of CO_{2} are "largely responsible" for climate change and warming of the Earth's surface was undisputed. Also undisputed was that Australia will experience more drought, heatwave extremes and fire related weather. Further, it was undisputed that these effects and their extent will be influenced by the extent of greenhouse gases emitted.

Justice Mordecai Bromberg, ruled that the minister had "a duty to take reasonable care to avoid causing personal injury" to youth and children of Australia, when the minister made a decision about the extension of the coal mining project under the Environment Protection and Biodiversity Conservation Act 1999. The aim, as stated by the teenagers, was to prevent both the new fossil fuel projects and the expansion of existing projects.

As the applicants were under 18, they were represented by Sister Marie Brigid Arthur, a sister of the Brigadine Order of Victoria.

Sharma's actions and court case may set legal precedent in future court cases in Australia where the impacts of climate change, need to be considered in future coal and fossil fuel mining approvals. Sharma's case is part of a recent 'legal surge' in climate action cases in the US and Australia led by teenagers. As of December 2021, there were 21 climate change cases, including the Sharma appeal case.

An expanded explanation of Sharma and others vs Minister for the Environment noted the Federal Court declared that "the Minister has a reasonable duty to avoid causing death or injury to persons who were under 18 years of age and ordinarily resident in Australia at the time of the commencement of this proceeding arising from emissions of carbon dioxide into the Earth’s atmosphere."

In March 2022, the Australian government had the ruling overturned on appeal.

== Media ==
Sharma's case, the implications for climate change, the youth of the team of the class action, and the historic precedent set by the results, have received much media and legal attention, within Australian, Indian, and British media outlets. Her case has been reported on, by SBS, the Sydney Morning Herald, the Guardian, and The Australian.

Writing in The Guardian in April 2022, just prior to the general election, Sharma addressed the nation's concern surrounding climate change in contrast to the government's lack of political will: "...with 114 new fossil fuel projects in the pipeline, and a two-party system with deeply ingrained ties to big coal and gas, what our major parties are promising is the exact opposite".

In 2024, Anjali's story and activism was covered by Australian Story, a program produced by the ABC. Sharma has written about climate change and the need for action for the Sydney Morning Herald. She was also featured in other media outlets such as Missing Perspective and Women Agenda.

== Legal implications ==
The case may be a significant precedent to inform other cases where climate change impacts are considered.

Sharma's work led to the temporary conclusion that, within Australian law, the Minister for the Environment has a duty to avoid causing personal injury and death to Australian children from carbon emissions which can lead to heatwaves and bushfires, when approving coal projects. Sharma's activism led to her being nominated as a finalist in the Children's Climate Prize. This is an "international prize annually awarded to young people who have made extraordinary efforts for the climate and environment."

== Legislation ==
Sharma worked with independent Senator David Pocock who introduced the Climate Change Amendment (Duty of Care and Intergenerational Equity) Bill 2023 to the Senate. The bill aimed at compelling the Federal Government to take into consideration the health of young people when approving developments, in particular mining or fossil fuel developments, and proposals which have the potential to release greenhouse gases.

== Prizes and awards ==
2021	Children's Climate Prize, finalist
2021	Women's Agenda Top 10 Women that lifted us in 2021
2022	Victorian Honour Roll of Women: Emerging leader
2023	Women's Agenda Emerging Leader in Climate Action
2023	Women's Agenda Leadership Awards.
