= Speed Date a Muslim =

Event held in Melbourne cafe

Speed Date a Muslim is an event held in a Melbourne cafe, in which visitors are invited to sit across from Muslim women and ask questions about Islam. It was founded by Hana Assafiri who was inducted to the Victorian Honour Roll of Women in 2017.
