= Linzi Wilson-Wilde =

Australian forensic scientist

Linzi Marianne Wilson-Wilde is an Australian forensic scientist. In February 2021, she took up the position of Director of Forensic Science SA. She was formerly the director of the National Institute of Forensic Science, working for that organisation for 12 years.

Wilson-Wilde has worked as a DNA specialist with various Australian police agencies throughout her career including Victoria Police, New South Wales Police Force and the Australian Federal Police.

In the aftermath of the 2002 Bali bombings, Wilson-Wilde coordinated the DNA analysis for body identification and the criminal investigation for Operation Alliance. Wilson-Wilde's DNA analysis is credited with playing a pivotal role in tracking down a bombing suspect.

She was awarded the Medal of the Order of Australia in 2003 for her services with the police during Operation Alliance.

Wilson-Wilde was also involved in the controversial mass-DNA screening of men in the New South Wales town of Wee Waa in 2000, in an attempt to track down a man who had bashed and raped an elderly woman.

In 2011, Wilson-Wilde received a PhD from the University of Canberra after writing her doctoral thesis, Species Identification in Wildlife Crime Investigations using Diprotodontia.

Wilson-Wilde was added to the Victorian Honour Roll of Women in 2014.

In the past, Wilson-Wilde has voiced concerns about forensic television dramas such as CSI, accusing the producers of exaggerating the work forensic scientists undertake. Wilson-Wilde discussed the CSI effect in a radio interview in 2016.
