= Collette Tayler =

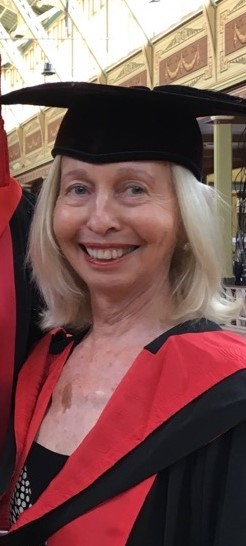
Collette Tayler

Collette Tayler (9 February 1951 – 1 December 2017) was an Australian academic and researcher whose worked influenced early childhood education policy. She held the Chair of Early Childhood Education and Care, Melbourne Graduate School of Education, at the University of Melbourne for ten years.

== Early life and education ==
Tayler was raised on a farm near Beaudesert, Queensland, and was educated at boarding school in Brisbane.

She graduated as a teacher in 1969 with a Teacher's Certificate (Primary) from Kelvin Grove Teachers College, Brisbane. During her teaching career she gained further qualifications including a Diploma of Teaching at Mount Lawley College of Advanced Education, Perth, and a Bachelor or Education at Edith Cowan University.

She completed a PhD in Education in 1987 at the University of Western Australia.

== Career ==
While an academic at the Queensland University of Technology Tayler was co-author of the OECD Thematic Report on Early Childhood Education and Care across 20 countries, titled Starting Strong II: Early Childhood Education and Care (2006).

She was selected as a participant in the Australia 2020 Summit in 2008, contributing to the Productivity Agenda (covering education, skills, training, science and innovation).

Tayler was the Chief Investigator of the longitudinal E4Kids study, tracking the quality of early childhood education and care programs, and the learning and development of children. The findings of her research influenced the direction of early childhood policy and leadership, and fed into early years policy and strategy, including Australia's National Quality Framework.

In her role as a teacher and administrator she had a significant impact on the training of early childhood professionals.

== Recognition ==
A scholarship in Tayler's name supports young Indigenous Australian students studying the Master of Teaching at the University of Melbourne. It was established to "recognise Indigenous Australians, and to support students in endeavours that promote excellent teaching of young Indigenous children, educational leadership and close collaboration with Indigenous leaders and/or communities".

In 2018, Tayler was inducted posthumously into the Victorian Honour Roll of Women. The Victorian Department of Education and Training’s Collette Tayler Excellence in Educational Leadership Award was established to recognise “an early childhood service or early years management organisation that has significantly improved learning and teaching practices over the past 18 months”.

== Selected publications ==
- Tayler, C (1989). Supervising in early childhood centres: a set of guidelines for staff
- Tayler, C. (2004). Child and family hubs and social capital. Brisbane, Qld.: Commissioner for Children & Young People.
- Cloney, D., Page, J., Tayler, C., & Church, A. (2013). "Assessing the quality of early childhood education and care". Policy Brief Centre for Community Child Health. July. doi:10.4225/50/5578d03856ea1.
- Tayler, C. (2016). The E4kids study: assessing the effectiveness of Australian early childhood education and care programs : overview of findings at 2016.
- Tayler, C. (2016). Learning and teaching in the early years. ISBN 9781107697188.
- Tayler, C. (June 1, 2016). Reforming Australian early childhood education and care provision (2009-2015). Australasian Journal of Early Childhood, 41, 2, 27-31.
