= Maria Dudycz =

Australian health professional and disability advocate

Maria Dudycz is an Australian health professional and advocate for people with disabilities.

Dudycz is most notable for her work developing the Victorian Disability Act 2006.

Throughout her career, Dudycz's medical experience has seen her receive a number of Federal Government appointments. These include chairing the Advisory Panel on the marketing in Australia of Infant Formula from 2001 until 2005, and directing the National Health and Medical Research Council's Breast Cancer Centre from 2001 until 2003.

Dudycz also chaired the Australasian College of Legal Medicine from 1998 until 2003.

In 2018, Dudycz was added to the Victorian Honour Roll of Women.
