= Maha Sukkar =

Australian police officer

Maha Sukkar is an Australian police officer in Victoria. Sukkar was the first Australian police officer permitted to wear a traditional Muslim hijab as part of her official police uniform when she became a Victoria Police officer in 2004. She graduated from the Victoria Police Academy using the Qur'an to swear the oath to the Victoria Police before receiving her badge from commissioner Christine Nixon.

Sukkar is the founder of the Victoria Police Muslim Association. Her current police rank is Senior Sergeant and she works at the police academy in Victoria. At the Australian Muslim Achievement Awards in 2009, Sukkar was named one of the "Australian Muslim Women of the Year". The Australasian Council for Women in Policing awarded Sukkar a bravery award in 2010.

In 2018, Sukkar was added to the Victorian Honour Roll of Women. A post on the Victoria Police Facebook page about Sukkar's induction onto the Honour Roll of Women triggered a series of threatening, racist and sexist comments. Commenting about the incident, Sukkar said, while she believes in freedom of speech, a line must be drawn when it comes to people encouraging physical attacks on her.

On 13 June 2019, she was awarded the Australian Police Medal (APM). In October 2019 she was named one of The Australian Financial Review's 100 Women of Influence in the Diversity and Inclusion category.
