= Anne Astin =

Australian biochemist and forensic expert

- Born: Durham, United Kingdom
- Education: PhD (Biochemistry) Honours (Biochemistry) B.Sc. (Chemistry)

Anne Marie Astin AM is an Australian biochemist and forensic expert. She was added to the Victorian Honour Roll of Women in 2010 and received a Public Service Medal in the 2011 Queen's Birthday Honours (Australia). In 2020, she was appointed a Member of the Order of Australia for significant service to the dairy industry, and to food safety regulations. Astin is notable for her role in dairy development and regulation, and her advocacy work regarding food safety standards.

== Education ==
Astin was born in Durham, England. She received a Ph.D. in Biochemistry in 1976, an Honors Bachelor of Science in Biochemistry and a Bachelor of Science in Chemistry and Biochemistry in 1973, all at the University of Liverpool. She later received a certificate from Griffith University (Queensland) for Public Sector Management.

== Early career ==
Astin was encouraged to enter this field of work by her mother, who pushed her to pursue nontraditional female roles. She began her career teaching at Monash University (Victoria). Afterwards, she became a forensic expert, focusing on police, and later joined the dairy industry. She became the CEO of the Dairy Food Safety Authority in the Government of Victoria.

== Career ==
Astin is the president of the Australian Institute of Food Science and Technology, the Chair of the William Angliss Institute Board and is the Chair of the Food, Beverage and Pharmaceutical Industry Reference Committee.

Other service positions include:

- Dairy Food Safety Victoria: Inaugural Chief Executive Officer, 2000–2011; Non-Executive Chairman, since 2017.
- Sheep Producers Australia: Non-Executive Director, since 2018.
- Food Agility CRC: Chair, Board of Directors, since 2017.
- Food Beverage and Pharmaceutical Industry Reference Committee, Australian Industry Skills Committee: Chair, since 2017.
- SafeFish Partnership: Chair, since 2015.
- Audit and Risk Committee, Energy Safe Victoria: Member since 2011; Chair since 2017.
- International Science Advisory Panel, Food Safety, Science and Research Centre, New Zealand: Member
- Australian Packaging Covenant Organisation: Independent Director, since 2017.
- Health Star Rating Advisory Committee: Deputy Chair, since 2014.
- Land Registry, Land Victoria: Director, 1998–2000

== Awards and recognition ==
- 2010: Outstanding Service Award, Australian Dairy Industry Council
- 2010: Inducted into Victorian Honour Roll of Women
- 2011: Public Service Medal
- 2016: John Bryant Gold Medal, Dairy Industry Association of Australia
- 2020: Member of the Order of Australia for significant service to the dairy industry, and to food safety regulations
