= Bronwyn King =

Australian oncologist and anti-tobacco campaigner

Bronwyn King AO
- Organization: Tobacco Free Portfolios
- Website: https://tobaccofreeportfolios.org/ https://bronwynking.com/

Bronwyn King AO is an Australian radiation oncologist and anti-tobacco campaigner. She is the founder and CEO of Tobacco Free Portfolios, a not-for-profit organisation aiming to eliminate tobacco from investment portfolios globally. She is a diplomat for the Global Charter for the Public's Health by the World Federation of Public Health Associations.

== Biography ==
King completed her medical training at the University of Melbourne. Following her graduation, she worked as an oncologist, treating patients with lung cancer and other health problems related to tobacco. In 2010 she had a meeting with a representative of her superannuation fund, Health Super (now First State Super), who informed her that she was investing in tobacco through one of the default options for the super fund. Disturbed that she was contributing to the industry, she created Tobacco Free Portfolios. The organisation has since created tobacco-free finance policies that have been implemented by over 40 Australian Superannuation fund (including King's original super fund) and by financial organisations across 10 countries.

King presented at TEDxSydney in 2018 on "You may be accidentally investing in cigarette companies".

== Honours and recognition ==
King was inducted onto the Victorian Honour Roll of Women in 2018 as a trailblazer in her tobacco-free activism. In 2019, King was appointed an Officer of the Order of Australia for "distinguished service to community health, particularly through advocacy for institutional investment strategies". In 2019, she was named Melburnian of the Year by Lord Mayor Sally Capp for her work with Tobacco-Free Portfolios.

In 2022, Tobacco-Free Portfolios received a World No Tobacco Day Award by the World Health Organization.
