= Clare Oliver =

Australian activist

Clare Oliver (25 August 1981 – 13 September 2007) was an Australian woman whose own health crisis prompted her to become an activist, garnering wide media coverage for her campaign to raise awareness about the risks of using solariums excessively. She had wanted to become a journalist and wrote a story before her death that was published in newspapers all over the country. Oliver's melanoma was first discovered as part of a health check-up shortly after she had been employed by SBS Television upon completion of a media degree. She went to Melbourne Girls' College and Presentation College Windsor in her high school years.

Clare partially blamed her melanoma on solarium use, but admitted that excessive tanning at the beach also contributed to her cancer. She believed the government didn't realise the dangers of solariums, and that young people need to be educated about the dangers of solariums before making any decisions regarding their use.

Oliver was diagnosed with melanoma at the age of 21. She gained publicity on 22 August 2007 by announcing in an open letter that she only had days to live due to the disease and stating her goal was to reach her 26th birthday. She did, and celebrated at Luna Park in St Kilda, Victoria. Oliver died less than three weeks later, on 13 September at the Caritas Christi Hospice in Kew.

The Australian government has since made previously voluntary code practices mandatory in the use of tanning beds in Australia. In February 2009, the Victorian government introduced new legislation to tighten the control of solariums and prohibit people aged under 18 from using them, and in January 2015, solarium use was banned entirely in South Australia, Victoria, Queensland and New South Wales. The ban on commercial solariums in Western Australia came into effect on 1 January 2016.

Oliver was posthumously inducted onto the Victorian Honour Roll of Women in 2009.
