= Eva West =

Australian accountant and local government administrator

Evelyn Maude "Eva" West MBE (14 September 1888 – 20 June 1969) was an Australian accountant and local government administrator.

West is most notable for being one of the first female accountants to be admitted to the Incorporated Institute of Corporate Accountants. West passed the final exam to qualify for admission in December 1916.

Passing the examination for municipal clerks in 1914 to become qualified, West embarked on a career in local government. She was appointed assistant shire secretary for the Shire of Jeetho-Poowong in Korumburra before moving to Melbourne to work with the Country Roads Board where she worked by day and studied at night for her accounting exams.

Returning to Traralgon in 1921, West opened her own accounting practice before commencing work at Traralgon Shire Council in 1922, rising to become shire secretary in 1934. West was also later appointed as secretary of Traralgon Waterworks Trust and Traralgon Sewerage Authority.

West's community work was extensive, holding honorary positions with more than twenty local community groups. She was considered a driving force behind the Traralgon Salvage Committee which raised funds during World War II. West had a special interest in the advancement of young girls, beginning a local branch of the Girl Guides, and serving on the council of St Anne's Girls Grammar School in Sale.

West was appointed as an MBE in the 1958 New Year Honours.

She died in Tralagon in 1969 and was buried in the Traralgon Cemetery.

Latrobe City Council currently offers a $3000 scholarship for Year 12 girls who wish to study business and accounting at university.

In 2018, West was posthumously added to the Victorian Honour Roll of Women.

West's father was long-serving Traralgon Shire secretary and Victoria state MP Walter West, who served as the Member for Gippsland South from 1922 until 1929.
