= Gaby Kennard =

Australian aviator, born 1944

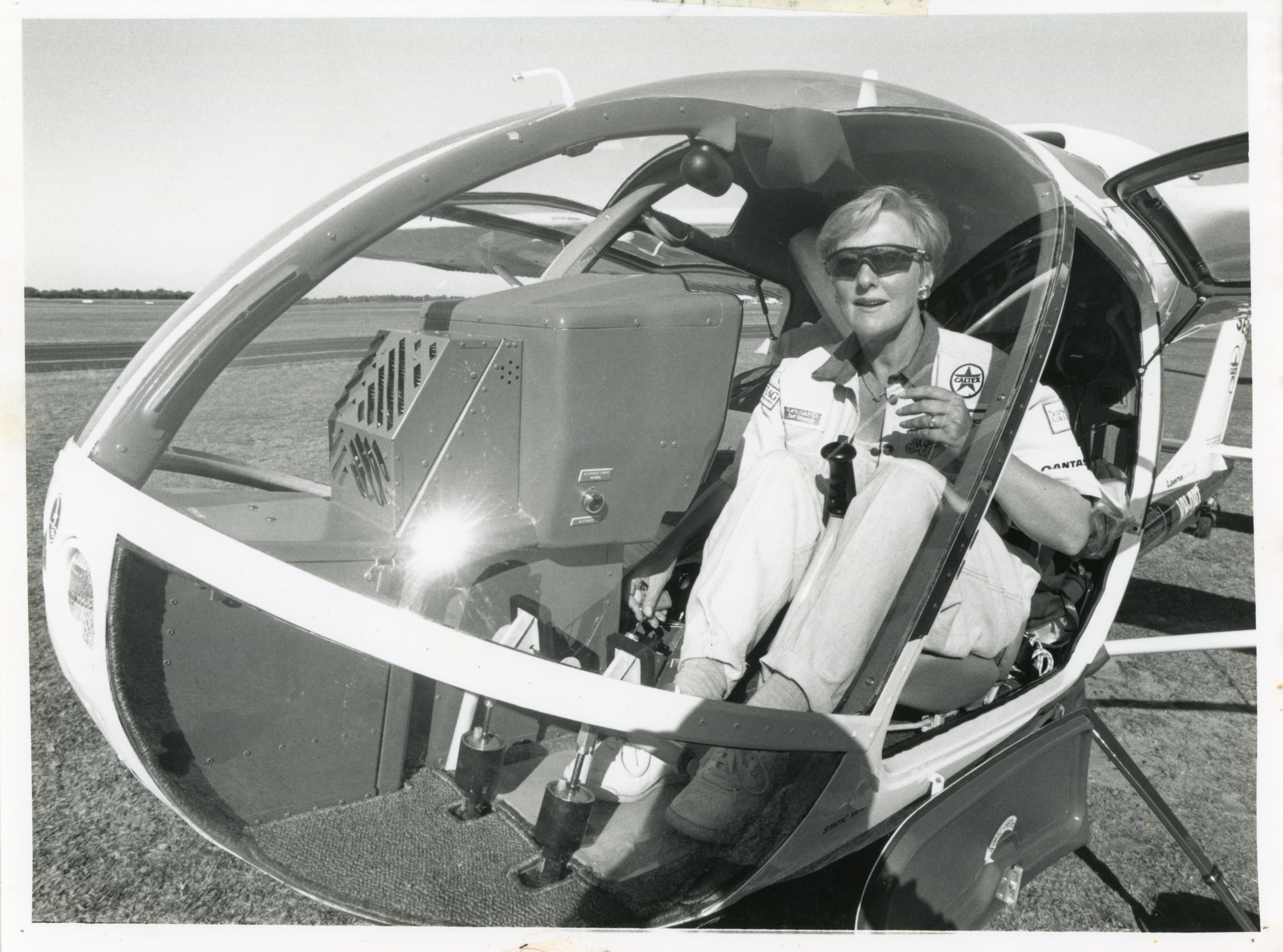
- Born: 1944; Melbourne
- Awards: Victorian Honour Roll of Women (2001)

Gaby Kennard (born 1944, East Melbourne, Victoria, Australia) was the first Australian woman to circumnavigate the globe by airplane.

== Early life ==
When she was 18 she found out that her natural father was a fighter pilot in the United States Army Air Force during World War II. He was killed in an aircraft accident near Amberley air base, Ipswich on July 17, 1943, shortly after she was conceived.

== Career ==
She completed her commercial pilot's licence in 1984 and her multi-engine instrument rating in 1987.

In 1989, she began her journey in ‘Gertie’, a second-hand single-engine 1981 model Piper Saratoga. Kennard followed Amelia Earhart's route as much as possible. The trip took 99 days and covered 29,000 nautical miles (54,000 km). In recognition of this achievement, she received the Harmon Trophy. The trip made Kennard a celebrity and she used this status to raise funds for the Royal Flying Doctor Service of Australia.

She is married to Neville Kennard and has a daughter and son.

== Recognition ==
In 2008 Kennard was awarded the Medal of the Order of Australia and was inducted onto the Victorian Honour Roll of Women in 2001.

Kennard has also been awarded the Australian Geographic Spirit of Adventure Award and the Nancy Bird Walton Trophy for Outstanding Achievement by a Woman of Australasia.
