= Ann Halpin =

Australian Presentation sister (1939–2009)

Sister Ann Halpin pbvm

Personal life
- Born: Ann Halpin; 15 May 1939
- Died: 10 December 2009 (aged 70)
- Known for: Contributions to the community of the City of Greater Dandenong
- Occupation: Religious sister, community leader

Religious life
- Religion: Christianity
- Denomination: Roman Catholic
- Order: Presentation Sisters

Ann Halpin pbvm (1939 – 2009) was an Australian religious sister and community leader. She has been recognised for her significant contributions to the community of the City of Greater Dandenong, named a "Living Treasure", Citizen of the Year, and inducted into the Victorian Honour Roll of Women.

== Early life and education ==
Ann Halpin was born on 15 May 1939 in St. Kilda. She was the eldest of six children and the only daughter of her parents William and Nance Halpin. Halpin was educated at St Colman's in Balaclava and at Presentation College in Windsor.

She worked for a time in a bank before joining the Presentation Sisters in her early twenties.

== Religious life and career ==
Halpin was professed as a member of the Congregation of the Presentation of the Blessed Virgin Mary in Victoria in 1963. Founded by the venerable Nano Nagle, who was dedicated to educating poor children in Ireland, the Sisters of the Presentation of the Virgin Mary is a Roman Catholic religious institute dedicated to teaching and service to the poor.

Halpin trained as a teacher and early in her career taught at Our Lady of Lourdes Catholic Primary School in Armidale. Her first role as a school principal was at St Joseph's in Boronia.

For many decades, Halpin dedicated her life and work to the Dandenong community and was known for her generosity of time and service. She was Principal of St Mary's Primary School in Dandenong from 1974-1980 and went on to study community development at Dandenong TAFE. The Presentation Sisters had a strong commitment to the Dandenong community, since the first sisters arrived in the area to teach in 1912.

Halpin was part of a task force of four sisters engaged by the parish of St Elizabeth's in Noble Park North for a period of five years, from 1979 to 1983. The sisters were to continue the establishment of the primary school, work, and train others in school administration, catechetics, and other parish duties. Halpin worked fulltime as a Catechetical Co-ordinator in the parish during this time.

In 1994, Halpin founded the 'Wellsprings for Women' drop-in centre in Dandenong. Working with refugees and migrants, she had become aware of the number of isolated women in the community, and the centre helped to empower, connect and enrich the lives of many women.

== Honours and legacy ==
Halpin was named a 'City of Greater Dandenong Living Treasure' and was Greater Dandenong's Citizen of the Year in 2009 in honour of her achievements in the local community. In 2010, she also received the Holt electorate's Australia Day award in recognition of her outstanding service to the local community.

Halpin Way in Dandenong was named in recognition of Halpin's significant contribution to the community and women of Dandenong.

In 2010, Halpin was inducted into the Victorian Honour Roll of Women.

When speaking of Halpin, a community member noted: “Ann embodied so much of what Dandenong is about – embracing community, celebrating diversity, volunteering, creating safe space for women and sharing a vision of community”

== Death ==
Halpin died on 10 December 2009 following a seven-month battle with a brain tumour. She was aged 70 years and was in the 46th year of her religious profession. Her funeral service was held at St Mary's Church in Dandenong and she was buried at the Dandenong Cemetery.
