= Jayashri Kulkarni =

Professor of Psychiatry

Jayashri Kulkarni AM FAHMS
- Born: c.1958
- Education: Monash Medical School, Melbourne
- Scientific career
- Thesis: Women and Psychosis (1997)
- Website: research.monash.edu/en/persons/jayashri-kulkarni

Jayashri Kulkarni (born c. 1958) is a Professor of Psychiatry at the Alfred Health and Monash University who works in the area of women's mental health. She has written about Premenstrual syndrome. She has used hormones to treat schizophrenia, bipolar disorder and depression in women. She founded and heads the Monash Alfred Psychiatry Research Centre, a clinical psychiatry research centre which currently has more than 160 staff and students.

== Early life and education ==
Kulkarni was born in Bijapur, Karnataka and her parents moved to Australia in 1961 when she was three years old. She graduated from Monash Medical School in 1981 and worked at the Mental Health Research Institute of Victoria from 1987 to 1994. Kulkarni worked as a doctor specialising in accident and emergency medicine before becoming a psychiatrist. By 1989 she was elected as a Fellow of the Royal Australian and New Zealand College of Psychiatrists although she did not gain her doctorate from her alma mater until 1997. Her thesis was 'Women and Psychosis'. She was appointed as a Professor of Psychiatry at The Alfred Hospital and Monash University in 2002.

== Research and career ==
Kulkarni has developed treatments for women's mental health that takes into account biological, social and psychological factors. In 1994 she was appointed as Director of Psychiatry at the Dandenong Area Mental Health Service, She was also an associate professor making her the first academic to work at the Dandenong Hospital. She and her team established the Dandenong Psychiatry Research Centre and by 2002 she had seventeen research staff. She was appointed as the chair of Psychiatry at The Alfred Hospital in 2002. She was the Director of Research for the School of Psychology, Psychiatry and Psychological Medicine at Monash University from 2009 to 2010. Kulkarni became the Director of the Monash Partners Academic Health Science Centre in 2013. Kulkarni's research demonstrates the use of estrogen reduced symptoms in schizophrenic women of childbearing age. She played an important role in the opening of the women-only wing at The Alfred Hospital Psychiatry Unit, to prevent sexual assault and violent attacks against women in psychiatric wards. Kulkarni regularly presents in media including the ABC and SBS. Kulkarni is the current President of the International Association for Women's Mental Health. In 2015, she founded the Australian Consortium for Women's Mental Health. She regularly writes for The Conversation on topics of women's mental health. Kulkarni became a Fellow of the Australian Academy of Health and Medical Sciences in 2016.

== Awards ==
- 2019 Member of the Order of Australia.
- 2014 Melbourne Award for Contribution to Community by an individual.
- 2011 Victorian Honour Roll of Women.
- 2005 Eli Lilly Oration Award.
