= Christine Kilpatrick =

Australian neurologist

Christine Kilpatrick AO FAHMS

Chief Executive, Royal Melbourne Health
- Incumbent
- Assumed office 2017

Personal details
- Occupation: Neurologist

Christine Kilpatrick is an Australian neurologist and the Board Chair of The Royal Children’s Hospital. She has held this position since 1 July 2015. Previously, she was the chief executive of the Royal Melbourne Hospital (2017-2023) and the Royal Children's Hospital (2008- 2017) and the executive director of Medical Services, Melbourne Health and executive director of the Royal Melbourne Hospital from 2004 to 2008. Before she held these positions, she worked as a neurologist at Royal Melbourne Health and engaged in extensive neurological research, especially epilepsy.

== Career ==
After earning an MBBS from the Melbourne Medical School, Kilpatrick began a career in neurology. She specialised in the treatment of epilepsy and was in charge of the Royal Melbourne's Hospital Epilepsy Program for 11 years. During this time period, she participated in numerous studies, most of them involving epilepsy. In 2004, she was appointed executive director of Medical Services at the Royal Melbourne Hospital. She then moved away from directly treating patients to health management. She was appointed as the chief executive of the Royal Children's Hospital in 2008. She held this position for 9 years before being promoted to Chief Executive of Royal Melbourne Health.

== Research ==
Kilpatrick has researched various neurological conditions, with a heavy focus on epilepsy. Some of her research included the effects on late diagnosis of nonepileptic seizures. She concluded that late diagnosis and insufficient criteria definitions significantly lowered a patient's quality of life, and that medical professionals must seek to combine neurological and psychiatric testing for earlier, more accurate diagnoses.

In addition, Kilpatrick investigated hippocampal sclerosis (HS) to better understand its relation to epilepsy. Her work included observing hippocampal surfaces with patients with and without hippocampal sclerosis and epilepsy of the temporal lobe to look for psychological differences. This study found that hippocampus did have different surface structures between those with and without HS, but the seizures themselves were not enough to describe the differences. A similar study found that patients with epilepsy showed increased neural atrophy and hypometabolism of the hippocampus. and In another important study, she worked with patients who had undergone temporal lobe lobectomy to treat hippocampal sclerosis and found that the surgery dramatically reduced incidents of seizures and improved patient's lives, showing that this treatment can be helpful for some patients.

Kilpatrick also experimented with different visualizing techniques to better identify and diagnose epilepsy. Her work indicated that contrast-enhanced perfusion imaging and diffusion-weighted imaging could be useful for the lateralization of temporal lobe epilepsy (for non-lesion cases).

Another area of study for Kilpatrick was the examination of the effects of various forms of epilepsy and their treatments had on mental health. One such study sought to see how antiepileptic drugs (AEDs) changed the mental health of a patient. After comparing multiple different mental health assessments and the self-reported experiences of the study's participants, researchers found that AEDs did increase the prevalence of various mental health conditions. Kilpatrick and her partners recommended that further studies be conducted to better understand the long-term mental health implications of AEDs. In addition, Kilpatrick participated in a more recent study where patients with focal epilepsy were assessed for their mental health over an 11-year period. This study found that there was a significant association between non-lesional epilepsy and symptoms of depression.

== Significant works ==
- Adams, S., O'Brien, T., Lloyd, J., Kilpatrick, C., Salzberg, M., & Velakoulis, D. (2008). Neuropsychiatric morbidity in focal epilepsy. British Journal of Psychiatry, 192(6), 464–469. doi:10.1192/bjp.bp.107.046664
- Jones, Simon G. MBBS, MPsych, FRANZCP; O'Brien, Terence J. MBBS, MD, FRACP; Adams, Sophia J. MBBS, MMed, FRANZCP; Mocellin, Ramon MBBS, MMed, FRANZCP; Kilpatrick, Christine J. MBBS, MBA, MD, FRACP; Yerra, Raju MBBS, FRACP; Lloyd, John H. MBBS, FRANZCP; Velakoulis, Dennis MBBS, MPM, FRANZCP Clinical Characteristics and Outcome in Patients With Psychogenic Nonepileptic Seizures, Psychosomatic Medicine: June 2010 - Volume 72 - Issue 5 - p 487-497 doi:10.1097/PSY.0b013e3181d96550
- Hogan RE, Carne RP, Kilpatrick CJ, et al Hippocampal deformation mapping in MRI negative PET positive temporal lobe epilepsy Journal of Neurology, Neurosurgery & Psychiatry 2008;79:636-640.
- T.J. O’Brien, E.P. David, C.J. Kilpatrick, P. Desmond, B. Tress, Contrast-enhanced perfusion and diffusion MRI accurately lateralize temporal lobe epilepsy: A pilot study, Journal of Clinical Neuroscience, Volume 14, Issue 9, 2007, Pages 841–849, ISSN 0967-5868, https://doi.org/10.1016/j.jocn.2006.07.003.
- Carne, R.P., O'Brien, T.J., Kilpatrick, C.J. et al. 'MRI-negative PET-positive' temporal lobe epilepsy (TLE) and mesial TLE differ with quantitative MRI and PET: a case control study. BMC Neurol 7, 16 (2007). https://doi.org/10.1186/1471-2377-7-16
- Lowe, A.J., David, E., Kilpatrick, C.J., Matkovic, Z., Cook, M.J., Kaye, A. and O'Brien, T.J. (2004), Epilepsy Surgery for Pathologically Proven Hippocampal Sclerosis Provides Long-term Seizure Control and Improved Quality of Life. Epilepsia, 45: 237–242. https://doi.org/10.1111/j.0013-9580.2004.35903.x
- Panelli, R.J., Kilpatrick, C., Moore, S.M., Matkovic, Z., D'Souza, W.J. and O'Brien, T.J. (2007), The Liverpool Adverse Events Profile: Relation to AED Use and Mood. Epilepsia, 48: 456–463. https://doi.org/10.1111/j.1528-1167.2006.00956.x

== Honours and awards ==
- Centenary medal – 2003
- Victorian Honour Roll of Women – 2014
- Inaugural Distinguished Fellow's Award, Royal Australasian College of Medical Administrators – 2017
- Top 50 Public Sector Women – 2018
- Officer of the Order of Australia – 2019
