= Marelyn Wintour-Coghlan =

Australian physiologist

Dr Marelyn Wintour-Coghlan AO FAA
- Born: Queensland, Australia
- Spouse: John Coghlan
- Scientific career
- Fields: Physiology

Elvie Marelyn Wintour-Coghlan AO FAA is an Australian physiologist who has focused her career on the endocrinology of the pregnant mother and foetus. She has developed techniques enabling her to follow development of foetal organs, showing that concentration of foetal urine can be used as an indicator of stress in the foetus. The important focus of her work was the discovery that foetal stressful conditions can be translated into adult health.

== Education and career ==
Professor Wintour-Coghlan was born in Queensland as one of six children and grew up in Brisbane where she attended All Hallows Catholic Girls School.

She studied physiology and biochemistry at the University of Queensland, after which she moved to University of Melbourne in 1960, taking up a position in the Department of Physiology where she obtained her MsC in 1964 and PhD in 1972. She has also received her DSc in 1988 at the same institution. In 1990 she became an NHMRC Senior Research Fellow at the Howard Florey Institute.

She moved to Monash University, Department in Physiology in 2003, where she became an honorary Professor until 2007, when she moved to the Department of Anatomy and Developmental Biology as an honorary professor. She has published more than 230 scientific publications and supervised 40 PhD students in her career.

== Awards and recognitions ==
In 2002 she was elected to Life Membership of the Endocrine Society of Australia. In 2004 she was elected to the Australian Academy of Science, being one of only 2 women to receive such an honour in the first 50 years of the Academy.

In 2014 she was inducted in the Victorian Honour Roll of Women.

She is a member of ARC/HMRC Research network in genes and environment in Development. She has also served on the Council of the International Union of Physiological Sciences. She was particularly influential in promoting physiological sciences in Africa and South America. with particular focus on Chile, which she adopted as her second home country, where she also did some work on llamas.

In 2007, as part of the 5th World Congress of Developmental Origins of Health and Disease (DOHaD), a satellite meeting was held in honour of her career, called "Healthy start for a healthy life: The Wintour's Tale", recognizing her contribution in being one of the first scientists to establish a link between adult health with early development. For that occasion, Tim Thwaites has written an excellent article, presenting this scientist in a different light

== Personal life ==
She has raised four children, and her passion for work and science was evident in the fact that all children were born during her holidays so she did not have to take time off work. Together with her husband, an esteemed scientist John Coghlan, she was instrumental in establishing a childcare centre at University of Melbourne. Her other passions in life are her family, swimming and history.
