= Jocelynne Scutt =

Australian politician

Jocelynne Annette Scutt AO (born 8 June 1947) is an Australian feminist lawyer, writer and commentator. One of Australia's leading human rights barristers, she was instrumental in reform of the laws on rape and domestic violence, and has served as Anti-Discrimination Commissioner of Tasmania and as a judge on the High Court of Fiji.

== Career ==
Jocelynne Scutt was born in Perth, Western Australia. She graduated in law from the University of Western Australia in 1969 and undertook postgraduate studies in law at the University of Sydney, at both Southern Methodist University and the University of Michigan in the United States, and Cambridge University in England.

Scutt has worked with the Australian Institute of Criminology and as director of research with the Legal and Constitutional Committee of the parliament of Victoria. From 1981 to 1982 she worked at the Sydney Bar and then was Deputy Chairperson of the Law Reform Commission, Victoria. In 1986 she returned to private practice in Melbourne. She served as the first Anti-Discrimination Commissioner of Tasmania from 1999 to 2004. In 2007 she accepted a judicial post on the Fiji High Court.

She is a member of the UN Committee Against Trafficking, a board member of the International Alliance of Women and its representative to the Coalition for the International Criminal Court. She is a writer, a film maker and is also a senior fellow at University of Buckingham and teaches law there.

A member of both the British Labour Party and Australian Labor Party, Scutt was elected to represent the division of Arbury on the Cambridgeshire County Council on 2 May 2013 and reelected on 4 May 2017.

Scutt was called to the English Bar in July 2014. She became a part of Electoral Lobby in Canberra as well as Sydney. She also established the publisher, Artemis.

== Selected works ==
- Scutt, Jocelynne (June 1984). For richer, for poorer: Money, marriage, and property rights. Penguin Books. ISBN 0-14-007650-6.
- Scutt, Jocelynne (June 1987). Different Lives. Viking Press. ISBN 0-14-006899-6.
- Scutt, Jocelynne (28 February 1994). Sexual Gerrymander. Spinifex Press. ISBN 1-875559-16-7.
- Scutt, Jocelynne (1997). The incredible woman: Power & sexual politics. Artemis Publications. ISBN 1-875658-28-9.
- Scutt, Jocelynne A (17 November 2020), Beauty, women's bodies and the law : performances in plastic, Palgrave Macmillan (published 2020), ISBN 978-3-030-27998-1

== Honours ==
- She was appointed an Officer of the Order of Australia in 1996, "for service to feminist jurisprudence and issues affecting women, including the establishment of a publishing company encouraging female contributions".
- She was inducted into the Victorian Honour Roll of Women in 2001.
