= Mary Crooks =

Australian feminist and public policy specialist

Mary Lynn Crooks, AO (born 1950) is an Australian feminist and public policy specialist. She has been the Executive Director of the Victorian Women's Trust since 1996.

== Early life ==
Born in Camperdown, Victoria, Crooks grew up in Heywood in southwestern Victoria. She attended the University of Melbourne, where she completed a Bachelor of Arts and a Master of Arts.

== Career ==
Crooks spent a number of years as a statutory appointment for the Victorian State Government, including the inaugural Chair of the Youth Policy Development Council and inaugural Chair of the Social Justice Consultative Council.

Crooks became the Executive Director of the Victorian Women's Trust in 1996. The Trust was first established in 1985. The Trust has since then been a part of a number of community engagements focussed on women's safety, the environment and sustainability, and other themes of social justice.

The Purple Sage Project was a notable initiative led by Crooks in 1998. Reflecting on political and industrial changes that had occurred in Victoria in the late 1990s under the premiership of Jeff Kennett, the initiative attempted to re-engage citizens in participatory democracy. The Purple Sage Project focussed on key issues of the time, with six thousand participants meeting in small groups of ten to lead and explore discussion.

Crooks has gone on to lead several initiatives, exhibitions and publications through the Trust, directed at celebrating the achievements of women and supporting and mentoring young people to build respect for women. This includes initiatives such as Ordinary Women, Extraordinary Lives, Be The Hero!, The Paradox of Service, and the online publication Sheilas.org.au.

In 2014 Crooks became the chair of Fitted For Work, an organisation aimed at developing women's self esteem and confidence, as well as skills, in order to guide them into employment and economic independence.

== Awards ==
- 2000 Inaugural Winner, Vida Goldstein Award
- 2001 Centenary Medal for outstanding service to women
- 2001 Inducted into the Victorian Honour Roll of Women
- 2012 Officer of the Order of Australia
- 2016 Winner, Public Policy category, Australian Financial Review/Westpac's 100 Women of Influence
