= Lynn Corcoran =

American-Australian immunologist and academic

Lynn Marie Corcoran
- Education: University of Melbourne
- Scientific career
- Workplaces: Walter and Eliza Hall Institute
- Thesis: Modes of activation of the cellular myconcogene in murine B and T lymphomas (1984)

Lynn Corcoran is an American–Australian immunologist who is Professor of Immunology at the Walter and Eliza Hall Institute. Her research considers cancer, parasitology and immunology, with a focus on B cells biology. She was inducted into the Victorian government's Honour Roll in 2013.

== Early life and education ==
Corcoran is from Minnesota. She was an undergraduate student at the University of Melbourne, where she was first introduced to genetic cloning. She was a doctoral researcher at the WEHI, where she studied lymphoid malignancies. Her research implicated that the c-myc transcription factor in T-cell lymphoma, and generated the Eμ-myc transgenic mouse (mice transgenic for the c-myc gene) that is widely used in studies of lymphocyte transformation. She remained at the WEHI as a postdoctoral researcher studying the genetics of malaria. Corcoran eventually left Australia, returning to the United States to join David Baltimore at the Whitehead Institute.

== Research and career ==
Corcoran returned to Australia and set up her own research group in the B-cell program. B-cells are white blood cells that are responsible for immunity. They mediate how effective vaccines are, and can cause certain cancers and autoimmune conditions if they are defective. Corcoran is interested in the biology of B lymphocytes, effector cells of the adaptive immune system. They are generated in bone marrow, migrate to the periphery, and have specialist responses for different pathogens. She has studied the immune system of koalas and Tasmanian devils. Tasmanian devil populations are threatened by the risk of contagious disease, in particular, the rapidly developing and fatal devil facial tumour disease. Corcoran studied the immune response of the Tasmanian devils after they were vaccinated against the disease. In October 2015, she worked with researchers at the Menzies Institute for Medical Research to monitor the immune response of vaccinated devils in the Narawntapu National Park, the first such study performed in the wild.

From 2009 to 2019, Corcoran co-led the WEHI Committee on Equity in Science. She argued that historically women had been intentionally left out of professions like science, and that this entrenched stereotypes about who should and who should not become a scientist. Guided by Corcoran, the WEHI made conference organisers work on gender balance in their scientific meetings. In 2019, the WEHI opened the Lynn Corcoran Early Learning Centre, which was the first childcare centre at any Australian Medical Research Institute.

== Awards and honours ==
- 2013 Inducted into the Victoria State Government Honour Roll for Women
- 2013 The WEHI 100 Women of Influence Awards
- 2014 University of New South Wales Eureka Prize for Scientific Research
- 2014 University of New South Wales Eureka Prize for Scientific Research Finalist

== Selected publications ==
- J. M. Adams; A. W. Harris; C. A. Pinkert; L. M. Corcoran; W. S. Alexander; S. Cory; R. D. Palmiter; R. L. Brinster (December 1985). "The c-myc oncogene driven by immunoglobulin enhancers induces lymphoid malignancy in transgenic mice". Nature. 318 (6046): 533-538, 533-8. Bibcode:1985Natur.318..533A. doi:10.1038/318533a0. ISSN 1476-4687. PMID 3906410. Wikidata Q57338722.
- Stephen L. Nutt; Philip D Hodgkin; David M Tarlinton; Lynn M Corcoran (20 February 2015). "The generation of antibody-secreting plasma cells". Nature Reviews Immunology. 15 (3): 160–171. doi:10.1038/nri3795. ISSN 1474-1733. PMID 25698678. Wikidata Q34463732.
- Ye Zheng; Ashutosh Chaudhry; Arnold Kas; et al. (1 February 2009). "Regulatory T-cell suppressor program co-opts transcription factor IRF4 to control T(H)2 responses". Nature. 458 (7236): 351–356. Bibcode:2009Natur.458..351Z. doi:10.1038/nature07674. ISSN 1476-4687. PMC 2864791. PMID 19182775. Wikidata Q33830564.
