= Jean Laby =

Australian atmospheric physicist

- Born: Jean Elizabeth Laby; 4 November 1915; Parkville, Victoria, Australia
- Died: 31 May 2008 (aged 92)
- Education: Melbourne Church of England Girls' Grammar School, University of Melbourne
- Occupation: atmospheric physicist
- Employer(s): University of Melbourne, RAAF College
- Known for: radar meteorology, atmospheric aerosols
- Notable work: Climatic Impact Assessment Program
- Parents: Thomas Howell Laby (father); Beatrice Littlejohn (mother)
- Awards: University of Melbourne Award

Jean Elizabeth Laby (4 November 1915 – 31 May 2008) was an early Australian atmospheric physicist.

== Biography ==
Laby was born in Parkville, Victoria. She is the daughter of Beatrice Littlejohn and Thomas Howell Laby, a professor of natural philosophy at the University of Melbourne. Laby was educated at the Melbourne Church of England Girls' Grammar School and then at the University of Melbourne, during the same time as her father's professorship. She gained a BSc in 1939, MSc in 1951, and PhD in 1959. She was the first woman to be awarded a PhD in physics from the University of Melbourne, and the first to be appointed lecturer in the department in 1959.

Laby was employed as a lecturer at the University of Melbourne and between 1961 and 1980 she was also a senior lecturer at the Royal Australian Air Force (RAAF) Academy at Point Cook, Victoria. Here she worked on radar meteorology, balloon-borne cameras and cosmic radiation measurements. She was also involved in the Climatic Impact Assessment Program between 1972 and 1980 and collaborated with the University of Wyoming measuring atmospheric aerosols, ozone and water vapour in the stratosphere.

== Recognition and legacy ==
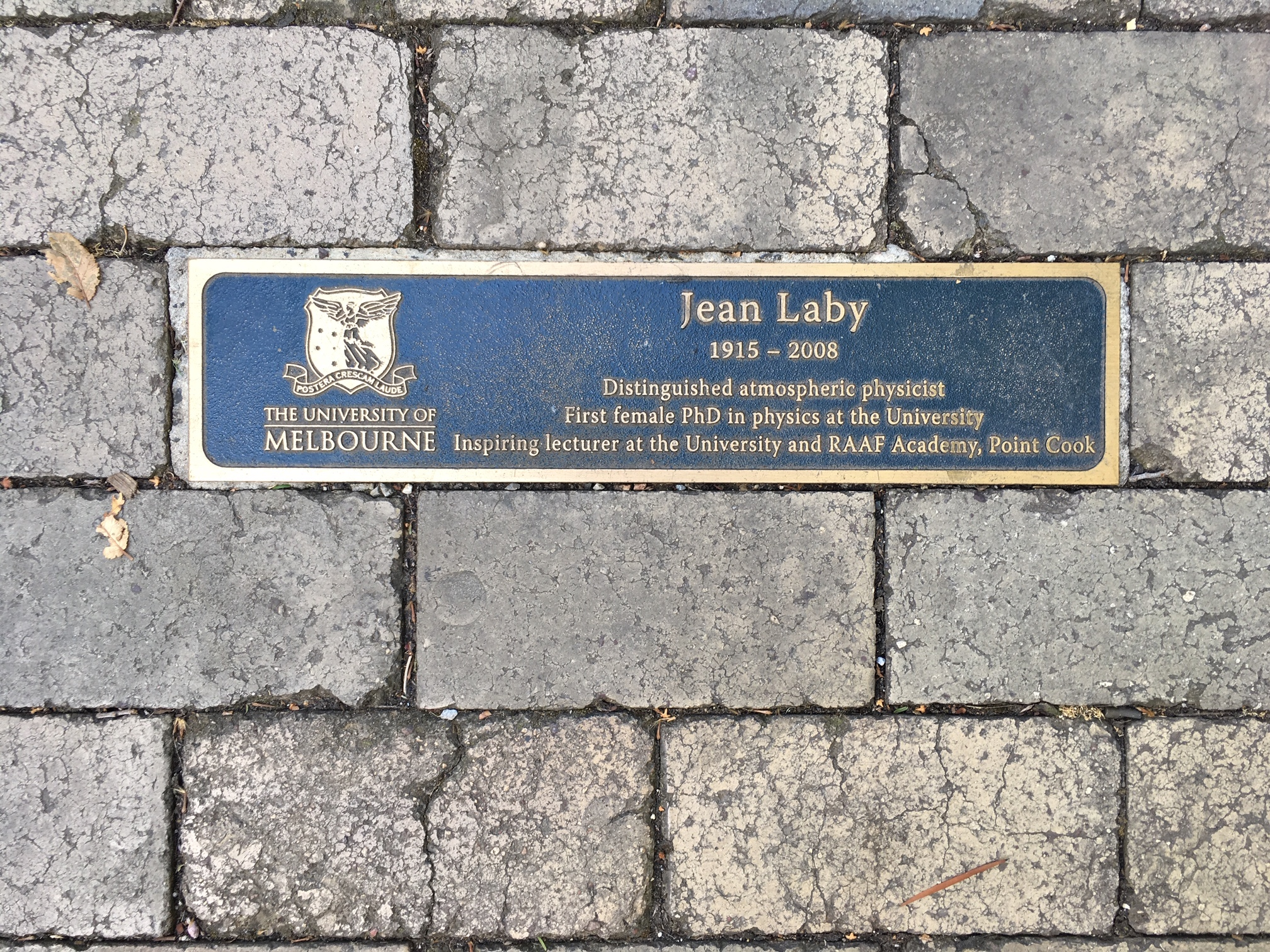
Bronze Plaque on Professors Walk on the Parkville campusof Melbourne University.

Laby was the recipient of a University of Melbourne Award, and bronze plaque honouring her is on the wall along the Professors' Walk at the Parkville campus of the university.

Laby was interviewed by the Australian Academy of Science for its Outstanding Women in Science program in 2000, and inducted to the Victorian Honour Roll of Women in 2009.

Her papers are held by the University of Melbourne archives and document the role of women in science and atmospheric research.

== Research ==
- Jean E. Laby, The thermal conductivity of water and some measurements with other liquids (MSc Thesis, Department of Science, The University of Melbourne, 1951)
- Jean E. Laby, Atmospheric winds and cosmic rays at balloon altitudes (PhD Thesis, Department of Physics, The University of Melbourne, 1959)
