= Sarah Carter (politician) =

Australian mayor

- Born: 22 April 1979
- Died: 6 August 2024 (aged 45); Melbourne, Victoria, Australia
- Education: Victoria University (BComm, 2006)
- Occupation: politician
- Years active: 2008-2024

Mayor of Maribyrnong City Council
- In office 2010–2011
- In office 2019–2020
- In office 2022–2023
- Political party: Australian Labor Party
- Awards: Victorian Honour Roll of Women (2024)

Sarah Helen Carter (22 April 1979 – 6 August 2024) was an Australian politician.

She is best known for being the first woman to serve three terms as mayor of Maribyrnong City Council.

Elected at the age of 32, Carter was also the youngest person to hold the position.

== Political career ==
Carter graduated with a Bachelor of Communications (Public Relations) degree from Victoria University in 2006.

Carter was first elected to Maribyrnong City Council in 2008 as a councillor representing Ironbark Ward.

In 2010, she became the youngest person to be elected mayor of Maribyrnong City Council. She was re-elected to the position in 2019 and again in 2022.

Despite a successful career in local government, Carter had an ambition to enter federal politics.

In October 2016, Carter was one of eight women to nominate for the seat in the Australian Senate vacated by Stephen Conroy. After what was described as a "factional brawl" within the Victorian right of the Australian Labor Party, Kimberley Kitching was selected to fill the vacancy.

In 2021, Carter contested Labor Party pre-selection for the newly created seat of Hawke, but she received just three votes and was defeated by Sam Rae who received 18 votes from the possible 21. Rae went on to win the seat for the Labor Party at the 2022 Australian federal election.

== Personal life ==
In July 2015, Carter revealed she had blocked 40 phone numbers after being bombarded with threatening and sexually explicit messages. Carter lamented that harassment had become worse with the rising popularity of social media amid calls for councillor's mobile phone numbers to not be made public.

In December 2016, Carter revealed she had been threatened with rape via an anonymous text message sent to her work phone. In a Facebook post, she described the alleged perpetrator as a coward, and told them: "if you think hiding behind an anonymous threat of violence is enough to rattle me, you're sorely mistaken. I shall continue to enjoy my strolls down Victoria Street as I have for the last 16 years, whilst police investigate the matter."

However, Carter stated that although she had reported the matter to the sexual offences team at a local police station in Footscray, the police had advised her they were limited in what they could do as the alleged offender had used a Globephone app. This prompted Carter to criticise the Crimes Act in Australia for not keeping up with technology while praising New Zealand for introducing the Harmful Digital Communications Act 2015.

In 2020, Carter announced she was engaged to advertising director Aaron Lipson but after announcing her engagement on Facebook, she advised her social media followers just hours later that the wedding had been called off.

Carter's partner at the time of her death was Nikhil Roy.

== Death ==
Carter was found dead at her home on 6 August 2024. It was later reported she had died from a suspected brain aneurysm.

Her death prompted tributes from various people including premier Jacinta Allan and acting Lord Mayor of Melbourne Nicholas Reece.

Her funeral was held on 16 August at Flemington Racecourse. It was attended by political figures such as Bill Shorten, Michael McCormack, Darren Chester. Josh Burns, Tim Watts, Dan Tehan, Ben Carroll, Danny Pearson, Melissa Horne and Natalie Hutchins.

== Legacy ==
Following her death, an annual Sarah Carter Memorial Award was established to recognise women on behalf of the Australian Workers' Union.

She was also posthumously inducted into the Victorian Honour Roll of Women in 2024.

In 2025, Maribyrnong City Council voted to publicly acknowledged Carter's contribution in a number of ways. This included naming a contemplative seat at Footscray Wharf in her honour, displaying her mayoral robes within the council chamber in the renovated Town Hall, and creating a Sarah Carter Gender Equity Award at the annual Civic Awards.
