= Nellie Ibbott =

Australian mayor (1889–1970)

Nellie Ibbott MBE
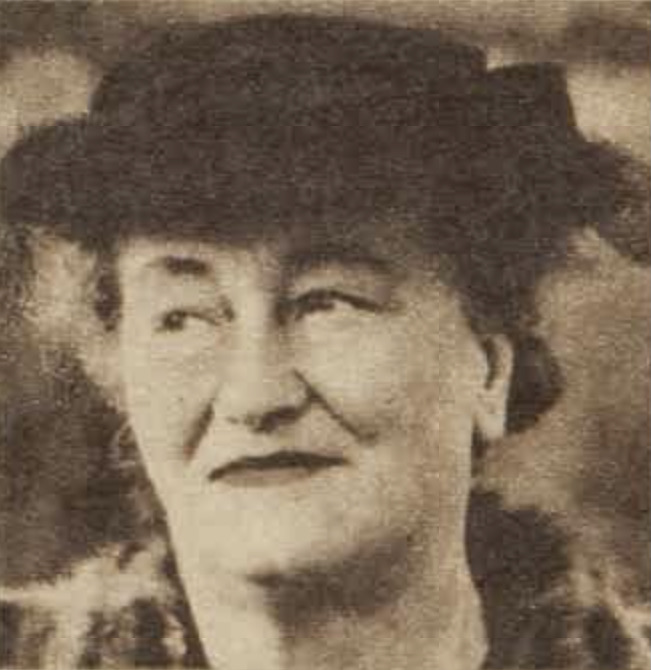

Mayor of the City of Heidelberg
- In office 1943–1944

Personal details
- Born: 20 June 1889 Leyton, Essex, England
- Died: 25 June 1970 (aged 81) Mornington, Victoria, Australia
- Awards: Victorian Honour Roll of Women

Nellie Grace Ibbott MBE (20 June 1889 in Leyton, Essex, England – 25 June 1970 in Mornington, Victoria, Australia) was a British-born Australian mayor.

== Early life ==
Nellie Grace Ibbott was born in Leyton, Essex, England to John Charles Pugh, a printing machine manager, and Ellie Beatrice. She emigrated to Australia in 1923.According to the Australian Dictionary of Biography, Nellie Grace Ibbott .

== Career ==
When Ibbott became mayor of the City of Heidelberg in 1943, she became the first woman in Victoria to hold mayoral office. In 1950 she was defeated at the council elections after serving for 22 years. During her tenure, she witnessed the expansion of local government services with a greater focus on community services, including the establishment of baby health centres, immunisation programs, and support for the arts

Ibbott also held leadership and board positions for numerous organisations, including the Austin Hospital Auxiliary, Victorian Association of Benevolent Societies, Victorian Baby Health Centres Association, Fairfield Infectious Diseases Hospital, Airlie Maternity Hospital and of the Victorian Council of Social Service.

She was also a vice-president of the Victorian division of the Liberal Party of Australia.

== Recognition ==
- Ibbott was awarded the MBE in 1954 "For service to local government and to charities".
- Nellie Ibbott Reserve in Ivanhoe, Victoria is named in her honour.
- In 2001, she was inducted into the Victorian Honour Roll of Women.
