= Jill Astbury =

Australian researcher

Jill Astbury is an Australian researcher in the field of women's mental health.

Astbury is perhaps best known for co-authoring the 1980 book Birth Rites Birth Rights with Judith Lumley.

She also wrote extensively for The Age newspaper throughout the early 1980's, reviewing books and discussing issues pertaining to women.

== Career ==
Astbury was deputy director of the Key Centre for Women's Health in Society, a World Health Organisation centre. She left this position to join Victoria University in Melbourne, Australia, as research professor in psychology. Her work focuses on the relationship between gender based violence including sexual violence and gender disparities in mental health including increased rates of depression, anxiety and post traumatic stress disorder.

== Publications ==
- Birth Rites Birth Rights: childbirth alternatives for Australian parents (Thomas Nelson Australia, 1980)
- Crazy for You: The making of women's madness (Oxford University Press, 1996)
- Mapping a global pandemic : review of current literature on rape, sexual assault and sexual harassment of women (Key Centre for Women's Health in Society, 2000)
- Women's mental health: an evidence based review (WHO, 2000)
- Gender disparities in Mental Health (WHO, 2001)
- Services for victim/survivors of sexual assault : identifying needs, interventions and provision of services in Australia (Australian Institute of Family Studies, 2006)
- Forced Sex: A Critical Factor in the Sleep Difficulties of Young Australian Women (Violence and Victims, 2011)
- Violating children’s rights: The psychological impact of sexual abuse in childhood (InPsych 2013, Vol 35)

== Recognition ==
In 2008, Astbury was inducted into the Victorian Honour Roll of Women for her research into violence against women.
