= Derek Byerlee =

Australian agricultural researcher, economist and policy advisor

- Born: 30 April, 1946; Orroroo, South Australia
- Citizenship: Australian and American
- Occupations: Economist and an academic
- Awards: Fellow, Agricultural and Applied Economics Association (2004); Honorary Life Member, International Agricultural Economics Association (2015); Doctor of Economics (honoris causa), University of Adelaide (2016); Officer of the Order of Australia (OA) (2019)

Academic background
- Education: B.S., Agricultural Sciences; M.S., Agricultural Economics; Ph.D., Agricultural Economics
- Alma mater: University of Adelaide; University of New England; Oregon State University

Academic work
- Institutions: Michigan State University; International Maize and Wheat Improvement Center; World Bank; Georgetown University
- Notable works: World Development Report 2008: Agriculture for Development; The Rise of Large Farms in Land-abundant Countries; Crop Yields and Global Food Security; The Tropical Oil Crop Revolution

Derek Byerlee AO (born 30 April 1946) is an Australian agricultural researcher, economist and academic. Throughout his career, he has worked in agriculture and food security in developing countries as a teacher, researcher, administrator, and policy advisor. He has lived and worked for approximately two decades across the three major developing regions: Africa, Asia, and Latin America.

== Early life and education ==
Byerlee was born 30 April 1946 in Orroroo, South Australia, where he grew up on a sheep-wheat farm west of Eurelia. He first attended Belle Vue, a remote one-room school. After further schooling in Orroroo, he completed his Bachelor's degree in Agricultural Science in 1966 from the University of Adelaide. He then went on to earn his Master's degree in Agricultural Economics from the University of New England, New South Wales in 1968 and in 1971, completed his PhD in Agricultural Economics from Oregon State University, USA.

== Career ==
Byerlee started his career as an agricultural development officer in Papua New Guinea in 1967. He then joined Michigan State University from 1971 to 1977, first as an assistant professor and then as an associate professor, with a special focus on research in West Africa. Between 1974 and 1975, he was based at Njala University College in Sierra Leone to co-organize and implement a nationwide rural household survey on production, consumption, rural nonfarm employment, and migration.

Byerlee then held positions as an economist and policy advisor. In 1977, he joined the International Maize and Wheat Improvement Center (CIMMYT) in Mexico where he served as an economist until 1983. During this time, he made contributions in using multidisciplinary approaches to design agricultural technologies in collaboration with agronomists and farmers. Later, he was appointed as CIMMYT's regional economist in South Asia from 1984 until 1987 where he worked on issues related to technical change and sustainability in post-Green Revolution agriculture. In 1987, he was promoted to director of the CIMMYT Economics Program, where he conducted research in technology design and evaluation, sustainable resource management, and applied policy analysis.

Byerlee joined the World Bank in 1994, where he was lead economist for agricultural research policy until 2001. While there, he served as the rural strategy and policy advisor from 2003 to 2005, contributing to the development of strategies on agricultural policy issues, including pro-poor growth, food price instability, and intellectual property rights. From 2005 until 2006, he was the lead economist for agriculture and rural development in the World Bank's Country Office for Ethiopia and Sudan, based in Addis Ababa. From 2006 to 2008, he was the co-director for the World Development Report Agriculture for Development.

After retiring from the World Bank in 2008, Byerlee engaged in consultancies and advisory roles and conducted research on global investment in large-scale farming, crop yields and global food security, the causes and impacts of the revolution in vegetable oils (oil palm and soybean) in the tropics, and maize technology adoption in Africa. He also made contributions to the history of agricultural science.

Between 2009 and 2012, he chaired the panel on Impact Assessment of the CGIAR and was a member of the Science Council of the CGIAR. He was the Editor-in-Chief of the journal Global Food Security from 2015 until 2018 and was appointed member and then Chair of the Board of the International Food Policy Research Institute, from 2018 to 2022.

Byerlee was appointed as an Officer of the Order of Australia in the 2019 Queen's Birthday Honours for "distinguished service to agricultural economics, particularly to sustainable development, poverty reduction and food security".

== Awards and honors ==
- 2016 – Doctor of Economics (honoris causa), University of Adelaide
- 2019 – Officer, Order of Australia (OA)

== Bibliography ==
=== Books ===
- The Emerging Maize-based Revolution in Africa: The Role of Technologies, Institutions and Policies (1997) ISBN 9781555877545
- Awakening Africa’s Sleeping Giant: Prospects for Commercial Agriculture in the Guinea Savannah Zone and Beyond (Directions in Development) (2009) ISBN 9780821379417
- Rising Global Interest in Farmland: Can It Yield Sustainable and Equitable Benefits? (Agriculture and Food Series) (2011) ISBN 9780821385913
- The Tropical Oil Crops Revolution: Food, Feed, Fuel and Forests (2017) ISBN 9780190222987

=== Selected articles ===
- Byerlee, D. (1974). Rural-urban migration in Africa: Theory, policy and research implications. International Migration Review, 8(4), 543-566.
- Byerlee, D., & De Polanco, E. H. (1986). Farmers' stepwise adoption of technological packages: evidence from the Mexican Altiplano. American journal of agricultural economics, 68(3), 519-527.
- Byerlee, D., De Janvry, A., & Sadoulet, E. (2009). Agriculture for development: Toward a new paradigm. ‘’Annual Review Resource Economics, 1’’(1), 15-31.
- Byerlee, D., & Fischer, K. (2002). Accessing modern science: policy and institutional options for agricultural biotechnology in developing countries. World Development, 30(6), 931-948.
- Byerlee, D., Stevenson, J., & Villoria, N. (2014). Does intensification slow crop land expansion or encourage deforestation?. Global food security, 3(2), 92-98.
