= Peter Smedley =

Australian businessman (1943–2019)

Peter Smedley AM
- Born: 2 February 1943; Perth, Western Australia
- Died: 11 April 2019 (aged 76)
- Education: Aquinas College, University of Western Australia, University of Melbourne
- Occupation: Businessman

Peter Smedley AM (2 February 1943 – 11 April 2019) was an Australian businessman who held senior roles with several Australian Securities Exchange listed companies.

== Early years ==
Smedley was born on 2 January 1943 in Perth, Western Australia where he completed his secondary education at the Christian Brothers' Aquinas College.

He attended the Royal Military College for two years. He studied for a Bachelor of Commerce at the University of Western Australia, later completing an MBA at the University of Melbourne.

== Career ==
Smedley spent much of his early career in the resources industry. He spent over 30 years working for Shell in Australia and around the world, gaining experience in energy and resource industries. He rose through the ranks to hold a number of senior positions including executive director of Downstream Oil and Chemicals from 1990 to 1992 and executive director of Coal and Metals for Shell Australia from 1986 to 1990 and area co-ordinator Central America, Caribbean and South America for Shell from 1982 to 1986. At Shell Smedley gained a reputation as a formidable negotiator and as a manager who attracted strong loyalty from his staff. He was seen as a prospective chief executive officer of Shell Australia by the group's Australian leadership at the time.

From 1992 to 2000 he was managing director and CEO of the Colonial Group. Under Smedley's leadership the company was transformed from a mediocre life insurance company into a broad-based financial services giant with strong businesses in Asia and Europe as well as Australia. During this period Colonial was demutualised and listed on the Australian Securities Exchange, and the company grew profits and revenue significantly, reducing costs and increasing funds under management from $1 billion in 1993 to $37 billion in 2000.

In addition to a major restructure of the business and the overhaul of its systems, Smedley successfully pursued series of major acquisitions including the acquisition of the State Bank of New South Wales and the Australian Australasian operations of global fund managers Prudential and Legal & General. His succession of acquisitions at Colonial and their integration, amounting to 17 acquisitions in eight years, earned Smedley the nickname in corporate Australia of Pacman in reference to the voraciously hungry 1980s video game character. Smedley also focussed the business toward the rapidly growing Asian financial services markets undertaking acquisitions and joint ventures in China, Vietnam and Malaysia including the Jardine Pacific life insurance business in Hong Kong. Colonial became the first Australian insurer to win an insurance licence in China.

The ability of Smedley and his management team to achieve demanding, publicly declared objectives and consistently and substantially outperform them was widely acknowledged by business commentators. Colonial was ultimately acquired by Commonwealth Bank in 2000 for $8.5 billion, or $8.25 per share. This represented a large premium to Colonial's listing price of $2.60 only two-and-a-half years earlier, and the price astounded many in the market.

From 2000 to 2002 he was managing director and chief executive officer of Mayne Nickless. Originally a transport business, Mayne diversified into health, pharmaceuticals and other industries. While at Mayne, and against long-standing practice in Australian hospitals, Smedley undertook a ruthless campaign of cost-cutting which included the centralisation of the group's hospital management. This resulted in an alienation of the hospitals' primary customers, their specialist doctors, who then referred their patients to other health care providers. The resultant heavy loss of income was a significant factor in Mayne's failure as a hospital provider.

He had a long association with CARE Australia, establishing its Business Council and serving as its chairman. He subsequently joined the Care Australia Board in 2000 and retired as its chairman in November 2009.

Smedley also served as a director with the Australian Mining Industry Council, the Australian Mining Industrial Research Association, Lloyd's Register, the Alumina Development Council, the Life Insurance Federation of Australia, and the Australian Banking Association. He was a Fellow of the Australian Institute of Company Directors.

Smedley was involved in not-for-profit organisations in the area of mental health. He was a member of the board of the Haven Foundation, an organisation providing housing for the mentally ill, and is chair of the board of Orygen Youth Health Research Centre, an organisation working in youth-oriented preventative psychiatry.

In the 2019 Queen's Birthday Honours Smedley was posthumously appointed a Member of the Order of Australia for "significant service to the community".

== Directorships ==
- Director and Chairman of Onesteel, appointed October 2000
- Chairman of Spotless, appointed Director 2006
- Chairman of the Colonial Foundation
- Chairman of Orygen Youth Mental Health Research
- Director of The Haven Foundation
- Chairman State Bank of New South Wales
- Deputy Chairman of Newcrest
- Director Austen & Butta
- Director Australian Mining Industry Council
- Director Australian Mining Industrial Research Association
- Director Lloyds Register
- Director Alumina Development Council
- Director Life Insurance Federation of Australia
- Director Australian Banking Association

== Community, charity and the arts ==
- Director The Haven Foundation
- Director Orygen Youth Health Research Centre
- Former chairman CARE Australia
- Former Director CARE International
- Business Council of the National Gallery of Victoria
- President's Council of the Art Gallery of New South Wales

== Other positions ==
- Advisory Council of CARE Australia
- Former Councillor for the Business Council of Australia
- Former Director Business/Higher Education Roundtable
- Former Director Christian Brothers Foundation for Charitable Works
