= Mike Xie =

Civil engineer and academic researcher (born 1963)

- 谢亿民
- Born: 1963 (age 62–63); China
- Education: Shanghai Jiao Tong University (BEng), Swansea University (PhD)
- Scientific career
- Fields: Structural engineering
- Institutions: RMIT University

Yi Min “Mike” Xie is an honorary professor at RMIT University.

== Early life and education ==
Xie was born in China and attended Shanghai Jiao Tong University obtaining his bachelor's degree in Engineering Mechanics. Later he studied at Swansea University and received a PhD degree in Computational Mechanics.

== Career ==
Xie came to Australia and joined the University of Sydney in the 1990s where he carried out research on the Evolutionary Structural Optimization (ESO) method which has become a popular method used in topology optimization. He was appointed a lecturer at Victoria University promoted to Senior Lecturer, then Associate Professor and eventually professor. He moved to RMIT University in the early 2000s as Professor and Head of civil and infrastructure engineering for the coming years. He founded the Centre for Innovative Structures and Materials in 2012.

=== Honours ===
- He was elected a Fellow of the Australian Academy of Technology and Engineering in 2011.
- In 2017, he received the Clunies-Ross Award from the Australian Academy of Technology and Engineering. In the same year, he was awarded the AGM Michell Medal by Engineers Australia.
- He was awarded the Australian Laureate Fellowship in 2019 by the Australian Research Council.
- In the 2019 Queen's Birthday Honours List, he was appointed a Member of the Order of Australia (AM), for "significant service to higher education, and to civil engineering".
- He was awarded the Victoria Prize for Science and Innovation in 2020.
