= Michael Davis (Australian lawyer) =

Australian space lawyer

Michael Edward Davis AO is an Australian space lawyer.

He is a former chairperson of the Space Industry Association of Australia, and a member of the International Institute of Space Law.

In 1996, Davis graduated with a Master of Space Studies from the International Space University in France.

As a proponent of establishing a dedicated Australian space agency, Davis is regularly featured in the media.

Davis played a key role in Adelaide's successful bid in hosting the International Astronautical Federation's 2017 congress, chairing the local organising committee.

In recognition to his contribution to the Australian space industry, Davis was appointed as an Officer of the Order of Australia in the 2019 Queen's Birthday Honours.
