= Gilah Leder =

Mathematics educator

Gilah Chaja Leder AM FASSA (born 1941) is an adjunct professor at Monash University and a professor emerita at La Trobe University. Her research interests are in mathematics education, gender, affect, and exceptionality. Leder was the 2009 recipient of the Felix Klein Medal.

== Early life ==
She was born in 1941, during the II World War, in Hilversum, North Holland. Being a Jewish child, she was hidden and protected by the catholic Zwanikken family of Laren. The father of the house, Cornelis Zwanikken worked at the municipality department of Social Affairs. Here, she was accepted as one of their own and affectionately called “zusje” (little sister). She learned to read and write in her early childhood. After the war she was reunited with her family. They started to live in Netherlands, where she visited coeducational elementary school. In November 1953 she moved to Adelaide, Australia. She started her 7th grade there at Woodwille High School, a coeducational government school. She got her bachelor's degree with honours in mathematics at University of Adelaide.

== Career ==
She started her career teaching maths at a high school in Melbourne. Later she was offered a position at Melbourne Secondary Teachers College. After having given birth to her 2 children, she completed her PhD and a doctorate at Monash University. Later she was appointed as a lecturer in the Faculty of Education at Monash University.

In 1990 she edited and published a journal Mathematics and Gender together with Elizabeth Fennema. In 1993 she was named Monash's University 'Supervisor of the Year' for her talent in supervising postgraduate students. In 1994 she was appointed a professor of Education at La Trobe University.

In 2010 she was honoured by the International Commission on Mathematical Instruction for her achievements in mathematics education, research and development.

She was elected a Fellow of the Academy of the Social Sciences in Australia in 2001. She is past President and life member of the Mathematics Research Group of Australasia and of the International group of Psychology of Mathematics Education.

Leder was made a Member of the Order of Australia (AM) in the 2019 Queen's Birthday Honours in recognition of her "significant service to higher education, and to the Jewish community of Victoria".

== Publications ==
Leder has almost 200 scholarly publications, including:

- Mathematics and gender: Changing perspectives. Handbook of research on mathematics teaching and learning: A project of the National Council of Teachers of Mathematics. Leder, Gilah C. In Grouws, Douglas A. (Ed). (1992). Handbook of research on mathematics teaching and learning: A project of the National Council of Teachers of Mathematics. (pp. 597–622). New York, NY, England: Macmillan Publishing Co, Inc.

== See also ==
- Mathematical anxiety
