= Ruth McNair =

- Occupations: General practitioner; academic; LGBTI health advocate
- Known for: LGBTI health research and policy advocacy;; chairing Pride Foundation Australia
- Awards: First Prize in Psychiatry, MBBS, University of Melbourne (1986); University of Melbourne Cultural Diversity Award (Academic Staff) (2000); Vida Goldstein Award for Women in Health, Women's Electoral Lobby Victoria (2001); Life Membership, Victorian Gay and Lesbian Rights Lobby (2007); Victorian Honour Roll of Women (2017); Life Membership, Victorian AIDS Council (now Thorne Harbour Health) (2017); Member of the Order of Australia (2019); Listed in Marquis Who's Who (2011, 2016, 2020–2021); Life Membership, Royal Australian College of General Practitioners (2022); Global Scholar Awards, Best Researcher in the Health Professions (2026)

Academic background
- Education: PhD 2010 (lesbian and bisexual women’s health); Fellow, Royal Australian College of General Practitioners 1994; Fellow Australian College of Rural and Remote Medicine 1998; Diploma Governance, Australian Institute of Community Directors 2023; Diploma Anaesthetics UK 1992; Diploma Obstetrics 1990; MBBS (Honours University of Melbourne) 1986

Academic work
- Institutions: University of Melbourne, Department of General Practice and Primary Care; Northside Clinic; Pride Foundation Australia (Chair)

Ruth McNair AM is an Australian general practitioner, academic and advocate for LGBTI health. She is an Honorary Associate Professor in the Department of General Practice and Primary Care at the University of Melbourne, where she has led research on lesbian and bisexual women's health and on LGBTI homelessness. She helped establish Northside Clinic in Melbourne in 2009, has advised the Victorian Government on LGBTI issues since 2000 and chaired Pride Foundation Australia from 2010 to 2026. She was inducted into the Victorian Honour Roll of Women in 2017 and appointed a Member of the Order of Australia in 2019. She is also a philanthropist, having been on the Pride Foundation Australia (previously Gay and Lesbian Foundation of Australia) board since 2005.

== Education ==
McNair holds a Bachelor of Medicine and Bachelor of Surgery, a PhD, diplomas in obstetrics and gynaecology and in anaesthetics from the United Kingdom, a Diploma of Governance, and a Fellowship of the Royal Australian College of General Practitioners. She completed her PhD, in lesbian and bisexual women's health, in 2010. The study was a qualitative investigation of the patient–doctor relationship between same-sex attracted women and their general practitioners, funded by a National Health and Medical Research Council scholarship.

== Career ==
McNair trained as a general practitioner and worked in various roles including for five years as a procedural GP in rural Victoria. While completing her PhD, McNair worked as a general practitioner in Carlton, specialising in lesbian and women's health, alongside a post as senior lecturer in the University of Melbourne's Department of General Practice. From 1998 to 2014 she worked as an academic general practitioner, leading medical curriculum development, coordinating teaching and conducting research. She became an Associate Professor in 2011 when she was the inaugural director of the General Practice and Primary Health Care Node of the North West Academic Centre. She is now an honorary Associate Professor at the Department of General Practice and Primary Care at the University of Melbourne.

In 2009 Ruth helped to establish Northside Clinic in North Fitzroy, a general practice focused on the health needs of the gay, lesbian, bisexual, trans and HIV-positive communities. By 2017 the practice was serving thousands of LGBTI people a year from across Victoria. She is also a visiting practitioner at the LGBTI specialist clinic in Darwin since 2016. In 2020 she had practised as a general practitioner for 27 years.

Ruth is an Honorary Associate Professor in the Department of General Practice at the University of Melbourne, teaching and conducting LGBTI communities research.

== Research ==
McNair's research interests include lesbian and bisexual women's mental health, sexual health, LGBT parenting, health care access, alcohol and smoking, and homelessness in LGBTI communities, as well as cultural competence training for health care providers. According to her SciProfiles profile, she has published 101 peer-reviewed papers and 13 book chapters.

In the 2026 Edition Ranking of Top Scientists in the field of Social Sciences and Humanities, McNair was ranked 6076 in the world and 454 in Australia, D index = 36.

=== Lesbian and bisexual women's health and medical education ===
McNair has published extensively on lesbian and bisexual women’s health, medical and interprofessional education since 1996. In 2003, McNair published the chapter "Outing lesbian health in medical education" in the journal Women and Health. She has also written a guide to sensitive care of gay, lesbian and bisexual patients in general practice, which the Royal Australian College of General Practitioners endorsed. Her recent work with colleagues includes studies of alcohol, tobacco and vaping use among lesbian, bisexual and queer women, the development of an SMS-based alcohol intervention for same-sex attracted women, and research on mental health and alcohol and other drug services run by LGBTIQ+ community-controlled organisations. She also contributed to the national Private Lives 3 survey and to a 2026 study of sexual violence and mental health among bisexual and pansexual women. She has supervised several Masters and PhD students, as well as supervising medical students and general practice registrars in her practice.

=== LGBTI homelessness ===
In January 2016, McNair began leading the Gay and Lesbian Foundation of Australia (GALFA) LGBTI Homelessness Research Project at the University of Melbourne, which was funded initially by GALFA, the Australian Communities Foundation, the Lord Mayors Charitable Foundation and Hanover (now Launch Housing). The Star Observer reported that the project's first report found LGBTI people at higher risk of homelessness than cisgender heterosexual people, with gay men and lesbians about three times more likely to be affected. The final report, by McNair, Cal Andrews, S. Parkinson and D. Dempsey, appeared in 2017 and was followed by a pilot model of care for trans and gender diverse people run by Launch Housing with the University of Melbourne, GALFA, Transgender Victoria and Drummond Street Services. In 2020 McNair and Andrews published the LGBTIQ+ Inclusive Practice Guide for Homelessness and Housing Sectors in Australia.

== Honours ==
- Quiet Achiever Rainbow Award (2006)
- Life member, Victorian Gay and Lesbian Rights Lobby (2007)
- Victorian Honour Roll of Women (2017)
- Life member, Victorian AIDS Council (2017)
- She was appointed a Member of the Order of Australia (AM) in the 2019 Queen's Birthday Honours in recognition of her "significant service to medicine, and as an advocate for the LGBTIQ community".

== Advocacy and community leadership ==
McNair was a member of the Victorian Ministerial Advisory Committee on gay, lesbian, bisexual, transgender and intersex health and wellbeing from 2000 to 2010 and again in 2013, and has served as member and chairperson of the Victorian Ministerial Advisory Committees on the subject. Her work on the committee included developing LGBTI health policy and a guide to inclusive practice for publicly funded health services. She co-chaired the Victorian LGBTI Health and Human Services Working Group and was a member of the government's LGBTI Taskforce (2015–2019).

She was founding Convener of the Fertility Access Rights Lobby (1999–2004), a founding member of the Rainbow Families Council, formed in 2005, and a founding member of the Australian Lesbian Medical Association, serving as its Convener from 2002 to 2005. She remains an active member of ALMA, being the Public Officer and as a member of the International Issues and Human Rights committee.

She became a director of Gay and Lesbian Foundation of Australia (GALFA) in 2005, soon after it was launched in 2004. She chaired its board from 2010 to 2026. GALFA became Pride Foundation Australia in January 2019, with McNair as Board Chair. Under her chairmanship the foundation funded research including a major report on the experiences of LGBTI Australians with disability. In December 2019 she presented a briefing on LGBTQIA+ refugees and people seeking asylum to the LGBTI Parliamentary Friends in Canberra, and in 2025 she co-wrote a review of the health and wellbeing of LGBTQIA+ people in rural Australia for the foundation.

== Selected publications ==
- McNair, R. (2003). "Outing lesbian health in medical education". Women & Health. 37 (4). Haworth Press. doi:10.1300/J013v37n04_07.
- McNair, R.; Kavanagh, A.; Agius, P.; Tong, B. (2005). "The mental health status of young adult and mid-life non-heterosexual Australian women". Australian and New Zealand Journal of Public Health. 29 (3): 265–271. doi:10.1111/j.1467-842X.2005.tb00766.x.
- McNair, R. (2005). "The case for educating health care students in professionalism as the core content of interprofessional education". Medical Education. 39 (5): 456–464. doi:10.1111/j.1365-2929.2005.02116.x.
- McNair, R.; Szalacha, L. A.; Hughes, T. L. (2011). "Health status, health service use, and satisfaction according to sexual identity of young Australian women". Womens Health Issues.
- McNair, R.; Hughes, T. (2012). "Coming out: is Mardi Gras still needed?". Medical Journal of Australia. 196 (4): 224.
- McNair, R. P.; Hegarty, K.; Taft, A. (2012). "From silence to sensitivity: a new Identity Disclosure model to facilitate disclosure for same-sex attracted women in general practice consultations". Social Science & Medicine. 75 (1): 208–216. doi:10.1016/j.socscimed.2012.02.037.
- McNair, R.; Hegarty, K.; Taft, A. (2015). "Disclosure for same-sex attracted women enhancing the quality of the patient-doctor relationship in general practice". Australian Family Physician. 44 (8): 573–578.
- McNair, R.; Pennay, A.; Hughes, T.; Brown, R.; Leonard, W.; Lubman, D. (2016). "A model for lesbian, bisexual and queer-related influences on alcohol consumption and implications for policy and practice". Culture, Health & Sexuality. 18 (4): 405–421. PMID 26466746.
- McNair, R.; Bush, R. (2016). "Mental health help seeking patterns and associations among a diverse group of Australian same sex attracted women: a survey-based study". BMC Psychiatry. 16: 209. doi:10.1186/s12888-016-0916-4. PMC 4932693.
- McNair, R.; Griffiths, L.; Reid, K.; Gitsham, H. (2016). "Medical students developing confidence and patient centredness in diverse clinical settings: a longitudinal survey study". BMC Medical Education. 16: 176.
- McNair, R.; Andrews, C.; Parkinson, S.; Dempsey, D. (2017). LGBTQ Homelessness: Risks, Resilience, and Access to Services in Victoria – Final Report (Report).
- McNair, R.; Pennay, A.; Hughes, T.; Love, S.; Valpied, J.; Lubman, D. (2018). "Health service use by same-sex attracted Australian women for alcohol and mental health issues: a cross-sectional study". BJGP Open. 2 (2): 1–11. doi:10.3399/bjgpopen18X101565. PMC 6184099.
- Andrews, C.; McNair, R. (2020). LGBTIQ+ Inclusive Practice Guide for Homelessness and Housing Sectors in Australia (Report).
- Hill, A. O.; Bourne, A.; McNair, R.; Carman, M.; Lyons, A. (2020). Private Lives 3: The health and wellbeing of LGBTIQ people in Australia. La Trobe University.
- McNair, R.; Parkinson, S.; Dempsey, D.; Andrews, C. (2022). "Lesbian, gay and bisexual homelessness in Australia: risk and resilience factors to consider in policy and practice". Health & Social Care in the Community. 30 (3): e687–e694. doi:10.1111/hsc.13439.
- McNair, R.; Grant, R.; An, T. L.; Mooney-Somers, J.; Pennay, A.; Power, J.; Bourne, A. (2026). "Agency and queer solidarity: help seeking for alcohol and nicotine issues among lesbian, bisexual and queer women and non-binary people". Journal of Substance Use and Addiction Treatment. 180: 209813. doi:10.1016/j.josat.2025.209813.
- McNair, R.; Wynne, K. (2026). "The primary care of older trans and gender diverse people". Australian Journal of General Practice. 55 (10). doi:10.31128/AJGP-01-26-7981.
