= Lex Doyle =

Australian pediatrician

Lex William Doyle AO is an Australian paediatrician, researcher and academic, best known for his widely published neonatal research into positive long-term outcomes for premature babies. He is currently the head of clinical research development at the Royal Women's Hospital in Melbourne, having been a consultant neonatal paediatrician at the hospital from 1983 until 2006.

Since 2003, Doyle has been a professor of neonatal paediatrics at the University of Melbourne, having been with the university since 1978, teaching and developing curriculum for the study of neonatal medicine. In the 1980s, he helped establish the Victorian Infant Collaborative Study Group. Doyle was also the head of the Murdoch Children's Research Institute's Centre for Research Excellence in Newborn Medicine from 2009 until 2018.

Working exclusively in neonatal paediatrics for much of his career, Doyle regularly speaks in the media about issues relating to premature births.

In May 2019, Doyle was awarded the Howard Williams Medal by the Royal Australasian College of Physicians and in June 2019 was appointed as an Officer of the Order of Australia in the Queen's Birthday Honours.
