= Bernard Carney =

Australian musician

Bernard James Carney is an Australian musician, who has worked in music since 1974. He is a songwriter, community choir director and guitar teacher. He has made nine albums, including "West", "Feathers and tributes", and "No time like the future". Carney was the main guest at the "Top Half Festival" near Alice Springs in June 2007 and he has regularly played at the Fairbridge Festival. He was the face of the Perth White Pages for 2010.

Carney has received four Australian song writing awards. He has played at Australia's major acoustic music festivals, including the Woodford Folk Festival in Queensland (for 10 consecutive years), The Port Fairy Folk Festival in Victoria (named Artist of the Year in 2003), and the National Folk Festival in Canberra. He has regularly toured internationally, and has done international support concert work with Foster and Allen, Gene Pitney, Taj Mahal, Ralph McTell, and Stephane Grapelli. Carney is frequently commissioned to write songs for television, radio, and community organisations.

Carney received an Order of Australia Medal in the 2019 Queen's Birthday Honours.
