= Delys Bird =

Australian writer

Delys Bird AM
- Born: Delys Margaret Bird; Kalgoorlie, Western Australia
- Occupation: Editor of Westerly magazine
- Writing career
- Language: English
- Subject: Literary criticism

Delys Margaret Bird AM is a Western Australian writer, academic and editor. She was editor of literary journal Westerly from 1993 to 2015 and has acted as editorial consultant since then.

== Biography ==
Bird was born in Kalgoorlie, Western Australia. After living in Sydney for a period, Bird’s tertiary education began as a mature age student at the University of Western Australia (UWA) in the 1970s.

She began teaching at UWA in 1980 and also taught literature at the Western Australian Institute of Technology (WAIT; later Curtin University). In 1985, Bird joined the faculty of Arts at UWA, where she was a member of the English Department as well as director of the Centre for Women’s Studies until her retirement in 2003.

Bird was editor of Western Australian literary journal Westerly from 1993 to 2015 and is currently editorial consultant to that publication. She had previously served as the journal's poetry editor. Bird has also conducted extensive research in Australian literature, with a focus on women writers and feminist theory.

== Awards ==
In 2011, Bird was the recipient of the Association for the Study of Australian Literature’s A.A Philips award for her long period of excellence in the editing of Westerly. Bird was made a Member of the Order of Australia (AM) in the 2019 Queen's Birthday Honours in recognition of her "significant service to higher education, and to gender studies and literature".

== Selected publications ==
=== Books ===
- Bird, Delys; Walker, Brenda (1991). Elizabeth Jolley: new critical essays. Moss Vale, New South Wales: Angus & Robertson. ISBN 9780207170607.
- Bird, Delys; Haskell, Dennis, 1948- (1992), Whose place? : a study of Sally Morgan's My Place (1st ed.), Angus & Robertson, ISBN 978-0-207-17676-0
- Bird, Delys (1993). Killing women: rewriting detective fiction. Pymble, New South Wales: Angus & Robertson. ISBN 9780207179488.
- Bird, Delys; Dixon, Robert; Lee, Christopher (2001). Authority and influence: Australian literary criticism 1950-2000. St. Lucia, Queensland: University of Queensland Press. ISBN 9780702232039.
- Bird, Delys; Were, Wendy; White, Terri-Ann (2003). Future imaginings: sexualities and genders in the new millennium. Crawley, Western Australia: University of Western Australia Press for the Westerly Centre. ISBN 9781920694074.

=== Journals ===
- Westerly (literary magazine), Editor 1990–present
- Bird, Delys (2013). "The end of the road: Joseph Furphy and Tom Collins in Western Australia". Journal of the Association for the Study of Australian Literary Criticism. 13 (1). National Library of Australia. Pdf.
