= 2019 Queen's Birthday Honours (Australia) =

Australian honours list

The 2019 Queen's Birthday Honours for Australia were announced on 10 June 2019 by the Governor-General, Sir Peter Cosgrove. The Birthday Honours were appointments by some of the 16 Commonwealth realms of Queen Elizabeth II to various orders and honours to reward and highlight good works by citizens of those countries. The Birthday Honours are awarded as part of the Queen's Official Birthday celebrations during the month of June.

== Order of Australia ==
General division ribbon

Military division ribbon

=== Companion of the Order of Australia (AC) ===
==== General Division ====
- The Honourable Annabelle Claire Bennett AO, SC – For eminent service to the law, and to the judiciary, particularly in the field of intellectual property, to higher education, and to sports arbitration.
- Professor Ruth Frances Bishop AO – For eminent service to global child health through the development of improved vaccines for paediatric gastroenteritis, and to medical research.
- Professor David James Burke AO – For eminent service to neurophysiology, to innovative treatments for spinal cord and brain trauma injuries, and to professional medical organisations.
- Sharan Leslie Burrow – For eminent service to industrial relations at the national and international level, to social equity, and as a champion of human rights in developing countries.
- Ita Clare Buttrose AO, OBE – For eminent service to the community through leadership in the media, the arts, and the health sector, and as a role model.
- Professor Alan Frederick Cowman – For eminent service to the biological sciences, notably to molecular parasitology, to medical research and scientific education, and as a mentor.
- Emeritus Professor John Mitchell Finnis – For eminent service to the law, and to education, to legal theory and philosophical enquiry, and as a leading jurist, academic and author.
- Hugh Michael Jackman – For eminent service to the performing arts as an acclaimed actor and performer, and to the global community, particularly as an advocate for poverty eradication.
- Emeritus Professor Leo Radom – For eminent service to science, particularly to computational chemistry, as an academic, author and mentor, and to international scientific bodies.
- Dennis James Richardson AO – For eminent service to public administration through leadership roles in the national security, defence and foreign policy arenas, and to workplace cultural reform.
- The Honourable Kevin Michael Rudd – For eminent service to the Parliament of Australia, particularly as Prime Minister, to Indigenous reconciliation, innovative economic initiatives and major policy reform, and through senior advisory roles with international organisations.
- Emeritus Professor Maree Therese Smith – For eminent service to science through pioneering research and innovation in the treatment of neuropathic pain, to gender equity, and as a role model.

=== Officer of the Order of Australia (AO) ===
==== General Division ====
- Elizabeth Anne Alexander AM – For distinguished service to higher education administration, to accounting and corporate governance, and as a role model.
- The Honourable Reginald Ian Barrett – For distinguished service to the law, and to the judiciary, particularly in the area of corporations law and legislation.
- Rosemary Anne Batty – For distinguished service to the community as a campaigner and advocate for the prevention of family violence.
- Professor Katherine Belov – For distinguished service to higher education, particularly to comparative genomics, as an academic and researcher.
- Professor Andrew Victor Biankin – For distinguished service to medical research, and to the treatment of pancreatic cancer, as a clinician-scientist.
- Martin Gerard Bowles PSM – For distinguished service to public administration at the senior level, and to policy development and program implementation.
- Emeritus Professor Scott Bowman – For distinguished service to higher education, notably in rural and regional areas, and to social outreach initiatives.
- Richard Philip Broinowski – For distinguished service to international relations through the advancement of Australia's diplomatic, trade and cultural relationships.
- Dr Derek Byerlee – For distinguished service to agricultural economics, particularly to sustainable development, poverty reduction and food security.
- Penelope June Clive – For distinguished service to the visual arts through philanthropic support for cultural institutions, and to the community of Tasmania.
- The Honourable Justice Paul Anthony Coghlan – For distinguished service to the law, and to the judiciary, and to the administration and review of criminal justice.
- Professor Rachel Claire Cooper – For distinguished service to higher education, particularly in the field of employment relations, and workplace policy and practice.
- Nicholas Richard Cowdery AM QC – For distinguished service to the law, to the protection of human rights, to professional legal bodies, and to the community.
- The Honourable Dennis Antill Cowdroy OAM QC – For distinguished service to the law, and to the judiciary in the civilian and military spheres, through a range of senior roles.
- Michael Edward Davis – For distinguished service to the space industry as an advocate, and to science education.
- Professor Lex William Doyle – For distinguished service to medicine, and to medical education, as a neonatal paediatrician, academic, author and researcher.
- Professor Calum John Drummond – For distinguished service to chemistry and materials science research, to commercialisation initiatives, and as a mentor.
- Dr Alan Anthony Dupont – For distinguished service to the international community through security analysis and strategic policy development.
- Dale Brendon Elphinstone – For distinguished service to business, particularly to the resources and manufacturing sectors, and to the community of Tasmania.
- Kathryn Joy Fagg – For distinguished service to business and finance, to the central banking, logistics and manufacturing sectors, and to women.
- Nicola Margaret Forrest – For distinguished service to the community through philanthropic support for education and the arts, to business, and to the community.
- Associate Professor Alexander Stewart Forrest – For distinguished service to dentistry, particularly to forensic odontology, and to education in the field of head and neck anatomy.
- Pamela Galli – For distinguished service to community health and medical research as a supporter and benefactor, and to children with a disability.
- Alison Grant Harcourt – For distinguished service to mathematics and computer science through pioneering research and development of integer linear programming.
- Emeritus Professor Andrew Peter Hopkins – For distinguished service to higher education, particularly to industrial safety and accident analysis.
- Professor Debra Elizabeth Jackson – For distinguished service to medical education in the field of nursing practice and research as an academic and author.
- Dr Ian Hugh Johnston AM – For distinguished service to classical literature through the translation and interpretation of ancient Greek and Chinese texts.
- Dr Megan-Jane Johnstone – For distinguished service to medical education in the field of nursing and health care ethics, to patients' rights, and to professional standards.
- Professor Fiona Kathleen Judd – For distinguished service to medicine, and to medical education, as a clinical psychiatrist and academic, and to professional bodies.
- Professor Karim M. Khan – For distinguished service to sport and exercise medicine, and to the promotion of physical activity for community health.
- Professor Christine Julie Kilpatrick – For distinguished service to medicine through senior administrative roles, to the promotion of quality in health care, and to neurology.
- Emeritus Professor Susan Caroline Kippax – For distinguished service to higher education, and to community health, particularly through research into HIV prevention and treatment.
- Dr Rachael Linda Kohn – For distinguished service to the broadcast media, particularly radio, as a creator, producer and presenter, and to Jewish studies.
- Emeritus Professor Edward William Kraegen – For distinguished service to medicine, and to medical education, in the areas of diabetes, obesity and glucose metabolism research.
- Dr Robert Ian Larbalestier – For distinguished service to medicine, particularly to cardiothoracic surgery and transplantation, and to professional medical societies.
- Simon Joseph Lewis PSM – For distinguished service to public administration in a range of portfolio areas, and to transformational change and organisational design.
- Cunxin Li – For distinguished service to the performing arts, particularly to ballet, as a dancer and artistic director.
- Professor David Anthony Mackey – For distinguished service to medicine, and to medical education, in the field of ophthalmology, as a clinician-scientist and academic.
- The Honourable Clare Majella Martin – For distinguished service to the people and Legislative Assembly of the Northern Territory, and as a community advocate.
- Professor Fjelda Elizabeth Martin – For distinguished service to dental education as an academic and researcher, and to professional organisations.
- The Honourable Nicholas Hugh Minchin – For distinguished service to the Parliament of Australia, particularly in the industry and finance portfolios, and to the people of South Australia.
- Professor Christina Anne Mitchell – For distinguished service to medicine in the field of haematology, to medical education and research, and to academic leadership.
- The Honourable Justice Debra Ann Mullins – For distinguished service to the law, and to the judiciary, to professional development and legal education, and to women.
- Susan Lee Murphy – For distinguished service to the natural resources sector in Western Australia, and to engineering.
- Her Honour the Honourable Vicki Susan O'Halloran AM – For distinguished service to the people of the Northern Territory, and to the disability sector through a range of executive roles.
- Peggy Yvonne O'Neal – For distinguished service to Australian rules football, to superannuation and finance law, and to the advancement of women in leadership roles.
- The Honourable Neville John Owen – For distinguished service to the law, and to the judiciary, to legal education, and to the community of Western Australia.
- Dr Edward Anthony Parkes – For distinguished service to conservation and the environment through the restoration of subtropical rainforest in northern New South Wales.
- Professor Richard George Pestell – For distinguished service to medicine, and to medical education, as a researcher and physician in the fields of endocrinology and oncology.
- Dr Gregory Myles Powell – For distinguished service to the international community of Zimbabwe in the field of paediatrics as a clinician and mentor.
- Dr Geoffrey William Raby – For distinguished service to Australia-China relations through senior diplomatic roles, and to multilateral trade policy development.
- Professor Peter David Rathjen – For distinguished service to higher education through senior administrative roles, and as a scientist and medical researcher.
- Professor Linda Jane Richards – For distinguished service to medical research and education in the field of developmental neurobiology, and to community engagement in science.
- Dr Tilman Alfred Ruff AM – For distinguished service to the global community as an advocate for nuclear non-proliferation and disarmament, and to medicine.
- John Erik Scanlon AM – For distinguished service to wildlife and flora conservation and protection through roles with international organisations.
- Carol Judith Schwartz AM – For distinguished service to the community as a supporter of women in leadership roles, to social justice advocacy, and to business.
- Francis Arthur Sedgman AM – For distinguished service to tennis as a player at the national and international level, and as a role model for young sportspersons.
- Professor Frances Separovic – For distinguished service to science education, particularly to biophysical chemistry, as an academic, and to young women scientists.
- Professor Michelle Yvonne Simmons – For distinguished service to science education as a leader in quantum and atomic electronics, and as a role model.
- The Honourable Carolyn Chalmers Simpson – For distinguished service to the law, and to the judiciary, particularly in the areas of criminal, defamation, administrative and industrial law.
- Diane Lee Smith-Gander – For distinguished service to business, to women's engagement in executive roles, to gender equality, and to the community.
- Natasha Stott Despoja AM – For distinguished service to the global community as an advocate for gender equality, and through roles in a range of organisations.
- Meryl Tankard – For distinguished service to the performing arts as a dancer, actor, producer, innovative choreographer and theatre director.
- Sigrid Madeline Thornton – For distinguished service to the performing arts as a film, television and stage actor, and to professional arts organisations.
- Emeritus Professor Graeme Turner – For distinguished service to higher education through pioneering work in the field of cultural studies and the humanities.
- Kay Ellen Van Norton Poche – For distinguished service to the community as a benefactor and supporter of Indigenous health and medical research initiatives.
- Professor Mark von Itzstein – For distinguished service to medical research and education in the field of structural biology and glycochemistry, and as a mentor.
- Emeritus Professor Murray Charles Wells – For distinguished service to higher education, particularly to accountancy, and to business administration.
- Neil Malcolm Westaway AM – For distinguished service to youth through Scouts at the national and international level, and to the community of Victoria.

==== Military Division ====
- Rear Admiral Gregory John Sammut AM CSC RAN – For distinguished service as the Head Future Submarine Program, and the General Manager Submarines.
- Air Vice-Marshal Tracy Lee Smart AM – For distinguished service in responsible positions to the Australian Defence Force in the fields of medical and health services.

=== Member of the Order of Australia (AM) ===
==== General Division ====
- Professor Margaret Anne Abernethy – For significant service to higher education, accounting research, and to student access and equity.
- Arun Kumar Abey – For significant service to the financial planning sector, and to the community.
- Ronald John Adams – For significant service to the forest and wood products industry.
- Ronald James Alexander – For significant service to sport and recreation, and to public administration.
- Matthew Allen – For significant service to sailing, particularly through executive roles.
- David Murray Anderson – For significant service to the maritime and road transport industries.
- Eric Russell Anderson – For significant service to conservation and the environment.
- William Nixon Apple – For significant service to the superannuation sector, and to trade unions.
- Raymond (Ray) Charles Argall – For significant service to film and television as a director and cinematographer.
- Lesley Mary Arrowsmith – For significant service to swimming as a technical official.
- Eliza Jane Ault-Connell – For significant service to community health, and as a Paralympic athlete.
- Robert John Badenach – For significant service to yachting, and to Australian rules football.
- Suzanne Dale Baker – For significant service to the film industry as a producer.
- Dr Christine Mary Ball – For significant service to anaesthesiology, and to medical education.
- Eric Bana – For significant service to the performing arts, and to charitable organisations.
- Peter Christopher Banki – For significant service to the legal profession, and to the community.
- The Right Reverend Dr Paul William Barnett – For significant service to the Anglican Church of Australia.
- Robert Anthony Barwell – For significant service to the beef cattle industry, and to food biosecurity.
- The Honourable Graham Rodney Bell – For significant service to family law, and to the judiciary.
- Delys Margaret Bird – For significant service to higher education, and to gender studies and literature.
- Professor Bruce Black – For significant service to otolaryngology, and to medical education.
- José Blanco – For significant service to Australia-Latin America business relations.
- Bruce William Bland – For significant service to Australia-France cultural relations, and to the community.
- Clive Ranger Blazey – For significant service to horticulture, to conservation, and to the community.
- Joseph Borensztajn – For significant service to the community through a range of organisations.
- Nancy Deloi Bosler OAM – For significant service to seniors, and to the community.
- Associate Professor John Sydney Boucher – For significant service to dentistry, and to professional standards.
- Ajahn Bhikkhu Brahmavamso – For significant service to Buddhism, and to gender equality.
- Susan Maree Bridge – For significant service to secondary education in New South Wales.
- Carolyn Maria Briggs – For significant service to the Indigenous community.
- Lucinda Brogden – For significant service to workplace mental health and wellbeing.
- Alan Francis Brown – For significant service to the thoroughbred racing industry.
- Bryan Eric Brown – For significant service to youth through Scouts, and to the community.
- Gavin Law Bunning – For significant service to the hardware retail industry, and to charitable organisations.
- David Causebrook Buttner – For significant service to the automotive manufacturing sector.
- Associate Professor Anthony John Buzzard – For significant service to the international education sector, and to medical science.
- Clinical Professor Peter Thomas Bye – For significant service to medicine, particularly to cystic fibrosis, and to medical education.
- Professor Victor James Callan – For significant service to higher education in the field of management.
- Krystyna Linda Campbell-Pretty – For significant service to the community through a range of charitable initiatives.
- Alisa Peta Camplin-Warner OAM – For significant service to the community through support for paediatric health care.
- Lindsay Cane – For significant service to community health, particularly in regional areas.
- Catherine Jane Caro – For significant service to the broadcast media as a journalist, social commentator and author.
- Dr William Macewan Carroll – For significant service to neurological medicine, and to people with Multiple Sclerosis.
- Veronica Mary Casey – For significant service to nursing, to medical education, and to community health.
- Victor George Chapman PSM – For significant service to the Indigenous community, to tertiary education, and to the visual arts.
- Marita Cheng – For significant service to science and technology, particularly to robotics.
- Professor Adrian David Cheok – For significant service to international education.
- Professor Elizabeth Mary Chiarella – For significant service to nurse and midwifery education, and to health care standards.
- Elizabeth Chong – For significant service to the hospitality sector, and to the promotion of Chinese cuisine.
- Amanda Julie Christensen – For significant service to community health, particularly to respiratory diseases.
- Lorraine Gaye Clark – For significant service to sport, particularly to the Special Olympics.
- Associate Professor Stella Clark – For significant service to medical research as an advocate for improved standards.
- Dr Jonathan Robert Clark – For significant service to medicine as a head and neck surgeon.
- Sarah-Jane Clarke – For significant service to the fashion industry, and to charitable organisations.
- Paul John Clauson – For significant service to the law, and to the people and Parliament of Queensland.
- Trevor Sydney Cohen – For significant service to the Jewish community, and to heritage preservation.
- Dr Steven Andrew Cohn – For significant service to dentistry, particularly to endodontology.
- Dr Matthew John Collins QC – For significant service to the law, to legal standards, and to education.
- Vicki Anne Condon – For significant service to youth through mentoring and support roles.
- Crispin John Conroy – For significant service to international relations and trade.
- Stephen William Conry – For significant service to the commercial property sector, and to the community.
- The Honourable Dr Elizabeth Constable – For significant service to the people and Parliament of Western Australia, and to education.
- Ian Leonard Cook – For significant service to conservation and heritage preservation.
- Dr Ian James Cook – For significant service to gastroenterology, and to medical research.
- Professor Alan James Cooper OAM – For significant service to medicine as a dermatologist and researcher.
- Emeritus Professor Leslie Joshua Copeland – For significant service to agricultural science as an academic and researcher.
- Peter Daniel Corcoran OAM – For significant service to rugby league, and to sport in New South Wales.
- Peter William Cousens – For significant service to the performing arts, and to the community.
- Sandra Jan Creamer – For significant service to Indigenous women, and to human rights.
- John Andrew Croll – For significant service to people with a disability, and to Paralympic and sporting organisations.
- Elizabeth Anne Crouch – For significant service to higher education, and to the rail transport industry.
- John William Cunningham – For significant service to the community through a range of roles.
- Sophie Alice Cunningham – For significant service to literature as an author, editor and role model.
- Ross Cunningham – For significant service to arts administration, and to industry recognition.
- Professor Hannah Grace Dahlen – For significant service to midwifery, nursing and to medical education.
- Robert Rae Dalziel – For significant service to the community, to rugby union, and to business.
- Andrew Laurence Davies – For significant service to architecture, and to the community.
- Dr Penelope Kay Davies – For significant service to higher education, and to community health.
- Professor Kevin Thomas Davis – For significant service to higher education, particularly in financial systems.
- Nigel Howard Davis – For significant service to the manufacturing and supply of dental products.
- Professor Phillip Roy Della – For significant service to nursing, midwifery, and to health care education.
- Noeleen Dix – For significant service to netball at the state and national level.
- Distinguished Professor Shi Xue Dou – For significant service to science education in the field of superconducting and electronic materials.
- Professor Ross Kingston Dowling OAM – For significant service to higher education, and to tourism and conservation.
- Dr Peter Ronald Dry – For significant service to viticulture, particularly to wine-grape research.
- Peter Brian Duncan – For significant service to business and manufacturing, to medical research, and to sport.
- John Francis Eades – For significant service to the law, to professional standards, and to the community.
- Gregory Lance Early APM – For significant service to the community, particularly to former law enforcement officers.
- Gregory Deane Edgecombe – For significant service to Australia-Indonesia relations, and to the community.
- Dr John Patrick Edmonds – For significant service to rheumatology, and to medical research.
- Dr Alan Eggleston – For significant service to the Parliament of Australia, and to the community of Western Australia.
- Dr Jonathan James Ell – For significant service to medicine, and to medical education and research.
- John Etherington – For significant service to the community, and to the Uniting Church in Australia.
- Dr Marguerite Virginia Evans-Galea – For significant service to women in STEMM as an advocate and role model.
- Emeritus Professor Neville Frank Exon – For significant service to marine geology, and to higher education.
- Bradley Paul Farmer – For significant service to surfing, to conservation, and to the community.
- Anna Fienberg – For significant service to literature as an author.
- Lisa Kim Filipetto – For significant service to bilateral relations, and to international humanitarian initiatives.
- Margaret Charlotte Fischer – For significant service to the festival sector, and to the LGBTIQ community.
- David John Flegg – For significant service to Australian rules football as an umpire.
- Dr Josephine Mary Flood – For significant service to archaeology, and to the study of Indigenous culture.
- Sarah Margaret Follent – For significant service to the visual arts, and to the print and broadcast media.
- Professor George James Foster – For significant service to education, particularly to management accounting.
- Emeritus Professor Richard Allen Fotheringham – For significant service to higher education, and to the performing arts.
- Reverend Dr Thomas Robert Frame – For significant service to higher education, to the Anglican Church of Australia, and to the community.
- Kathleen Clare Freedman – For significant service to the visual arts as a benefactor and supporter of emerging artists.
- Dr Michael Atticus Fullilove – For significant service to international relations.
- Sealin Roger Garlett – For significant service to the Uniting Church in Australia.
- Lionel Gell – For significant service to the community through philanthropy.
- Frances Gerard – For significant service to the hospitality industry, and to the arts.
- Professor Lynn Gillam – For significant service to medical education in the field of bioethics.
- James Lindsay Glissan ESM QC – For significant service to the law in New South Wales.
- Lilliane Gomatos – For significant service to the Greek community of the Northern Territory.
- Ricky Grace – For significant service to the Indigenous community of Western Australia.
- Professor Michael Lindsay Grayson – For significant service to medicine in the field of infectious disease.
- Margaret Anne Green – For significant service to veterans and their families, and to nursing.
- Professor Michael John Grigg – For significant service to medicine as a vascular surgeon.
- Professor David Ian Guest – For significant service to horticultural science, particularly to plant pathology.
- Distinguished Professor James Ernest Guthrie – For significant service to higher education in the field of accounting.
- Nigel Clive Hadgkiss APM – For significant service to the building and construction sector, to public administration, and to law enforcement.
- Emeritus Professor Ralph Frederick Hall – For significant service to higher education as an academic, and to the community.
- James Robert Hall – For significant service to the wool industry, and to the agricultural sector.
- Susan Maria Halliday – For significant service to social welfare, particularly through gender equality and human rights advocacy.
- Craig James Hamilton – For significant service to public administration in defence policy.
- Dr Lorraine Sarah Hammond – For significant service to higher education, and to the community.
- Professor Winita Hardikar – For significant service to medicine, particularly to paediatric liver disease and transplantation.
- Geoffrey Leonard Harris – For significant service to the community through a range of organisations.
- Christine Hazel Hawkins – For significant service to business and commerce, and to primary industry.
- Dimity Jane Hawkins – For significant service to the global community as an advocate for nuclear non-proliferation and disarmament.
- Kent Heazlett – For significant service to business and international trade.
- Professor Andrew Alistair Heggie – For significant service to medicine and dentistry in the field of oral and maxillofacial surgery.
- Professor Paul Hamilton Hemsworth – For significant service to agricultural science, and to animal welfare.
- Margery Heather Henderson – For significant service to the community through the preservation of political history.
- Robert Bruce Hershan – For significant service to the textile industry, and to the Jewish community.
- Helen Claire Hewett – For significant service to the superannuation industry, to mental health, and to women.
- Kerry Margaret Heysen-Hicks – For significant service to the film industry as a producer.
- Grant Edward Hill – For significant service to the community through social welfare initiatives.
- Majell Maree Hind – For significant service to Australia-Indonesia relations through diplomatic roles.
- Katherine Anne Hirschfeld – For significant service to engineering, to women, and to business.
- Harry Hoffman OAM – For significant service to the community through charitable organisations.
- Professor Raymond Warren Holden – For significant service to the performing arts through music.
- Dr Michael John Hollands – For significant service to medical education and professional standards, and as a surgeon.
- Professor Stuart Brian Hooper – For significant service to medical research in the field of foetal lung and cardiorespiratory development.
- Lieutenant Colonel Geoffrey Hourn (Retd) – For significant service to veterans and their families, and to international relations.
- Professor Geoffrey Isbister – For significant service to medical research in the field of toxicology.
- Margaret Jack – For significant service to the resources sector, and to Australia-China relations.
- Emeritus Professor Jeffrey Bruce Jacobs – For significant service to higher education, particularly in the field of Asian studies.
- Dr Jeremy William Johnson – For significant service to tourism, and to the community of Ballarat.
- Professor Rosemary Ross Johnston – For significant service to higher education, and to children's literature.
- Associate Professor Brigid Jordan – For significant service to medicine in the field of paediatrics and infant mental health.
- Elias Jreissati – For significant service to the community through charitable organisations.
- Athena (Tina) Karanastasis – For significant service to the multicultural community of South Australia.
- Daryl Ann Karp – For significant service to the arts, particularly to the museum and galleries sector.
- Professor Constance Helen Katelaris – For significant service to medicine in the field of immunology and allergy.
- Dr Catherine Ann Keenan – For significant service to children as an advocate for improving literacy, and to the community of Redfern.
- Cassandra Leigh Kelly – For significant service to business through executive roles, and as an advocate for gender equity.
- Dr Jennifer Helen Kendrick – For significant service to medicine, and to medical education and standards.
- Robert Kennedy – For significant service to business, and to the community of the Hunter.
- Emeritus Professor Ivan Robert Kennedy – For significant service to higher education, particularly to agriculture.
- Charles Peter Kiefel OAM – For significant service to Australia-United States relations, and to philanthropy.
- Anthony William Kiernan – For significant service to business, and to the community.
- Warren Leslie King – For significant service to business, particularly in the area of defence industry capability.
- Mary Anne Kirk – For significant service to midwifery and nursing, and to professional standards.
- Kim Joanne Koop – For significant service to social welfare, particularly through disability and mental health advocacy.
- David Milton Krasnostein – For significant service to the law through equitable access to justice.
- Professor Steven Anthony Krilis – For significant service to medical research in the areas of inflammation, thrombosis and allergic disease.
- Professor Jayashri Kulkarni – For significant service to medicine in the field of psychiatry.
- Marcus Dallas La Vincente – For significant service to the not-for-profit sector, particularly through legal support.
- Deborah Jane Lawrie – For significant service to aviation as a commercial pilot, and to women in the profession.
- Dr Lenore Layman – For significant service to higher education, particularly in the fields of Australian and public history.
- Professor Gilah Chaja Leder – For significant service to higher education, and to the Jewish community of Victoria.
- Dr Richard Priestley Lee – For significant service to intensive care medicine.
- Dr Andrew Grant Lemon – For significant service to community history, and to the racing industry.
- Andrew Robert Leventhal – For significant service to geotechnical engineering, and to the community.
- Rodney David Levis – For significant service to the fashion retail and manufacturing industry, and to the community.
- David Chong Li – For significant service to the community through support for the performing arts.
- Dr Peter Edgeworth Lillie – For significant service to medicine in the field of anaesthesia.
- Dr Douglas Allister Lingard – For significant service to medicine as a radiologist, and to community health.
- Dr John Charles Litt – For significant service to preventative medicine as an influenza specialist, and as a general practitioner.
- Harvey Warren Lockwood – For significant service to rugby league as an administrator, and to the community.
- Lucien James Longley – For significant service to basketball as a player, coach and administrator.
- Dr James Ormonde Lucas – For significant service to paediatric dentistry, and to professional organisations.
- Michael John Lynskey – For significant service to international eye health programs, and to the community
- Dr Ian Donald MacLeod – For significant service to the museum and galleries sector.
- Angus Alan John Macneil – For significant service to primary industry, and to the community.
- Dr Prudence Joan Manners – For significant service to medicine as a paediatric rheumatologist.
- Peter Ross Martin – For significant service to multi platform and print media as an economics journalist.
- Joan Helen Masterman – For significant service to tourism in Tasmania, and to conservation and the environment.
- Louise Mary Mayo – For significant service to vocational education and training, and to the community.
- John Maurice McClelland – For significant service to the community through the Royal Life Saving Society in Queensland.
- Dr David Alexander McCredie – For significant service to medicine in the field of paediatric nephrology.
- Dr Mary (Tein) Christine McDonald – For significant service to conservation and the environment.
- Emeritus Professor Alasdair William McDowall – For significant service to science, particularly in the field of electron microscopy.
- Alastair James McEwin – For significant service to people with a disability, and as a human rights advocate.
- Simon Roger McGrath – For significant service to the tourism and hospitality sector.
- Richard Brian McGruther OBE – For significant service to rugby union, and to the community.
- Bruce Douglas McIver – For significant service to politics, and to the road transport industry.
- Dr Rosalind McMillan – For significant service to music education in Victoria.
- Associate Professor Ruth Patricia McNair – For significant service to medicine, and as an advocate for the LGBTIQ community.
- Dennis Meredith – For significant service to hockey at the local, state, national and international level.
- Dr Colin George Merridew – For significant service to surgical and obstetric anaesthesia.
- Heidi Belinda Middleton – For significant service to the fashion industry, and to charitable organisations.
- Emeritus Professor Gabriel Adelin Moens – For significant service to the law, and to higher education.
- Stephen Thomas Moore – For significant service to rugby union, and to charitable organisations.
- Dr Helen Margaret Moore – For significant service to English language education, and to community music.
- Helen Penelope Morris – For significant service to the philanthropic sector, and to community health.
- Alan Keith Morris – For significant service to wildlife conservation, particularly native bird life.
- Di Grace Morrissey – For significant service to literature as a novelist, and to conservation and the environment.
- Associate Professor Michael John Murray – For significant service to geriatric medicine as a clinician and educator.
- Margaret Cecile Niall – For significant service to public health as a dietician and nutritionist, and to the community.
- David Wayne Nilsson – For significant service to baseball as a player, coach and mentor.
- Dr Brad Norman – For significant service to science as a marine biologist.
- Dr Clare Nourse – For significant service to medicine in the field of paediatric infectious diseases.
- His Honour Judge Christopher Gerard O'Brien – For significant service to the law, and to the judiciary.
- Dr Clare Cecilia O'Callaghan – For significant service to community health.
- Kevin O'Shea – For significant service to the refrigeration and air conditioning industry.
- Susan Mary Oliver – For significant service to business, and to women.
- Beverley Maeling Overton – For significant service to conservation and the environment.
- Ingrid Veronika Ozols – For significant service to mental health and suicide prevention in the workplace.
- Kathryn Palmer – For significant service to sports administration.
- Professor Barbara Ann Pamphilon – For significant service to higher education, and to the community.
- David John Papps – For significant service to public administration.
- Adell Elaine Parkyn – For significant service to hockey.
- Susan Jane Peden – For significant service to the community.
- Salvatore Perna – For significant service to racing integrity, and to the community.
- James William Peters – For significant service to the legal profession, and to rowing.
- Miss Dorothy Betsy Peters – For significant service to the Indigenous community of Victoria.
- Andrew Michael Phelan – For significant service to judicial administration.
- Douglas Purdom Phillips – For significant service to business in the Northern Territory.
- Associate Professor Leo Arieh Pinczewski – For significant service to medicine, particularly to the advancement of knee surgery.
- Warwick John Plunkett – For significant service to pharmacy, and to professional organisations.
- Dr Emmanuel Clive Pohl – For significant service to the finance sector, and to the community.
- Emeritus Professor John Hurlstone Pollard – For significant service to community music events, and to education.
- Emeritus Professor Anthony James Radford – For significant service to medicine, to medical education, and to global health.
- Dr Helen Patricia Ramsay – For significant service to plant science.
- John Alexander Ramsay – For significant service to public administration in Tasmania.
- Peter James Raven – For significant service to aviation safety.
- Dr Peter John Read – For significant service to Indigenous history.
- Dr Joseph Abraham Reich – For significant service to ophthalmology.
- Catherine Gay Reid – For significant service to healthcare delivery, and to philanthropy.
- Campbell Hamilton Reid – For significant service to the print media.
- Professor Kerry Anne Reid-Searl – For significant service to nurse education.
- Professor Gregory John Reinhardt – For significant service to judicial administration, and to education.
- Crocifissa Fifa Riccobono – For significant service to the music industry.
- Peter Arthur Rix – For significant service to the music and events industries, and to philanthropy.
- Geoffrey Craig Roberts – For significant service to urban planning and development.
- Dr Lindy Jane Roberts – For significant service to medicine, and to professional organisations.
- Andrew Charles Ross – For significant service to the performing arts.
- Leigh Anthony Royans – For significant service to social welfare in South Australia.
- Leigh Peta Sales – For significant service to the broadcast media.
- Dr Nicholas Saltos – For significant service to medicine, and to education.
- Margaret Ann Sansom – For significant service to the community.
- Anthony Michael Schembri – For significant service to hospital administration, and to medical research.
- Bruce Alan Schumacher – For significant service to the recreational fishing industry.
- Guy Theodore Sebastian – For significant service to the music recording industry, and to charitable initiatives.
- Garry James Sebo – For significant service to the community, and to aged care.
- Jeanette (Jenni) Alison Seton – For significant service to young people with cancer and their families.
- Michael Warner Shand QC – For significant service to the Anglican Church of Australia, and to the legal profession.
- Distinguished Professor Dharmendra Prakash Sharma – For significant service to higher education, and to computer science.
- Professor Arun Kumar Sharma – For significant service to computer science and information technology.
- Anthony Alexander Shaw – For significant service to rugby union.
- Stephen Wayne Sheaffe – For significant service to community history preservation.
- Professor Malcolm Ross Sim – For significant service to occupational and environmental medicine.
- Dr Leon Abraham Simons – For significant service to cardiovascular medicine, and to education.
- Mahalingam Sinnathamby – For significant service to the building and construction sector, and to the community.
- Professor Robert Clive Skinner – For significant service to environmental water management.
- Dr David Richard Smart – For significant service to hyperbaric medicine, and to professional organisations.
- The late Mr Peter John Smedley – For significant service to the community.
- Cameron Wayne Smith – For significant service to rugby league.
- Carlene Dorothy Smith – For significant service to pharmacy, and to professional organisations.
- Bruce Raymond Spangler – For significant service to basketball, and to the community.
- Andrew Philip Spate – For significant service to conservation, particularly to caves and karsts.
- Edward Douglas Spooner – For significant service to the renewable energy sector.
- Dr Richard James Stark – For significant service to neurological medicine, and to professional associations.
- Dr Paul Steinfort – For significant service to the construction sector, and to the community.
- Kevin Philip Stone – For significant service to people with a disability.
- Professor Carolyn Mary Sue – For significant service to medicine, particularly to mitochondrial disease.
- Dr William Francis Sultmann – For significant service to education, and to the community.
- Dr Keith Douglas Suter – For significant service to international relations, and to the Uniting Church in Australia.
- Dr Rodney Robin Syme – For significant service to social welfare initiatives, and to law reform.
- Nadia Josephine Taylor – For significant service to the community through philanthropic initiatives.
- Alf Alexander Taylor – For significant service to the community through philanthropic initiatives.
- Jennifer Irene Teasdale – For significant service to education, and to international relations.
- Faith Thomas – For significant service to cricket, and to the Indigenous community.
- Gabrielle Catherine Thompson – For significant service to the performing arts, particularly to music.
- Dr David Mark Thurin – For significant service to sporting organisations, and to community health.
- Johnathan Dean Thurston – For significant service to rugby league, and as a role model.
- Dr John William Tierney OAM – For significant service to people with polio.
- Dr Mark Toner – For significant service to engineering and the technological sciences.
- Dr Lizabeth Tong – For significant service to medicine, particularly to child mental health.
- Melvyn James Tozer – For significant service to the insurance sector, and to charitable groups.
- Glenn Thurston Turner – For significant service to the community of the Hunter.
- Margaret Eileen Twomey – For significant service to international relations.
- Dr Peter Lyndon Tyree – For significant service to engineering, and to education.
- Janine Mary Walker – For significant service to education, to community health, and to the media.
- Gregory Joseph Wall – For significant service to business, and to the community.
- Graeme Duncan Wallis – For significant service to the mining sector.
- Theanne Rae Walters – For significant service to medical education and accreditation.
- The Reverend Dr Ann Patricia Wansbrough – For significant service to the Uniting Church in Australia.
- Sean Patrick Wareing – For significant service to children who are deaf or blind.
- William Bressan Watson – For significant service to the plumbing industry.
- Jonathan James Webster – For significant service to the law, to education, and to the community.
- Dr Gary Hilton Weiss – For significant service to business, and to the community.
- Peter James White – For significant service to the finance sector, and to the community.
- Dr Susan White – For significant service to sports medicine.
- Michael Roy Whitney – For significant service to cricket, and to the broadcast media.
- Professor James Leonard Wilkinson – For significant service to medicine, particularly paediatric cardiology.
- Peter John Williams – For significant service to architecture.
- Dr James Roland Williams CBE – For significant service to the energy and resources sectors, and to business.
- Associate Professor Peter Milward Williams – For significant service to higher education, particularly to architecture, property and construction.
- Professor Brenda Wilson – For significant service to community health, and to the people of South Australia through a range of roles.
- Dr Dianne Fay Winkler – For significant service to people with a disability.
- Dr Charlotte Ann Wood – For significant service to literature.
- The Honourable Terence Anthony Worthington QC – For significant service to the law, and to the judiciary.
- Professor Yi-Min Xie – For significant service to higher education, and to civil engineering.
- Professor Dao-Yi Yu – For significant service to ophthalmology, and to education.
- Professor Hala Zreiqat – For significant service to biomedical engineering, and to research councils.

==== Military Division ====
- Colonel James Bruce Brown – For exceptional service and leadership in the field of Rotary Wing operations and capability management.
- Air Vice-Marshal Robert Timothy Chipman CSC – For exceptional service to the Australian Defence Force in coalition air operations, air combat capability preparedness, and strategic capability development and sustainment.
- Group Captain Patrick Joseph Cooper CSC – For exceptional service to the Australian Defence Force in battlefield airspace control training, aviation coordination and operations, and air traffic control capability regeneration.
- Major General Justin Frederick Ellwood DSC – For exceptional service as Deputy Chief of Army, Director General Career Management - Army and Chief of Staff Headquarters Forces Command, and for contributions to the management of Army's people capability.
- Commodore Darron John Kavanagh CSC RAN – For exceptional performance of duty in the field of Navy Capability Management.
- Colonel Michael Robert Kennedy – For exceptional service as Deputy Chief of Staff Army Headquarters, Director of Personnel Policy, Director of Workforce Strategy and the Director of Career Management Integration.
- Group Captain Scott Matthew Parry – For exceptional service to the Australian Defence Force in E-7A Wedgetail aircraft capability development; Aviation Safety Regulations implementation; and E/A-18G Growler and F/A-18F Super Hornet aircraft sustainment.
- Brigadier Michael Charles Reade – For exceptional performance of duty as the Director of Clinical Services of the 2nd General Health Battalion and Professor for Military Medicine and Surgery.
- Colonel Paul Justin Rosenberger – For exceptional service in logistics reform and development for the Australian Defence Force.
- Rear Admiral The Honourable Justice Michael John Slattery RAN – For exceptional service in the field of military law, particularly as Judge Advocate General of the Australian Defence Force.
- Colonel Katherine Susan Sowry – For exceptional service to the Directorate of Personnel-Army, Project Suakin and as the Chief of Staff of Joint Health Command.
- Wing Commander Brent Cameron Taylor – For exceptional service to the Australian Defence Force in air mobility capability development.
- Brigadier V – For exceptional service to the Australian Defence Force in the field of Special Operations and Counter Terrorism.
- Warrant Officer Gary William Wight – For exceptional service to the Royal Australian Navy in the field of Navy People leadership and management.
- Commodore Malcolm Kenneth Wise OAM RAN – For exceptional service as the Commander Combined Task Force 150 while deployed on Operation MANITOU from November 2017 to May 2018.

==== Honorary Division ====
- Professor Jacob George – For significant service to medicine as a gastroenterologist and hepatologist.
- The Honourable Justice Monika Schmidt – For significant service to the law, to the judiciary, and to industrial relations.

=== Medal of the Order of Australia (OAM) ===
==== General Division ====
- Dr Bahia Abou-Hamad – For service to multicultural affairs, and to the arts.
- Carol Elizabeth Adams – For service to local government, and to the community of Perth.
- Christine Margaret Agius – For service to people with a disability.
- Margaret Anne Allen – For service to the community of the Blue Mountains.
- Paul Allison – For service to the insurance sector, and to the community.
- Derek Godfrey Amos – For service to community mental health.
- Katherine Frances Anderson – For service to the visual arts, particularly as an illustrator.
- Alexander Irvine Anderson – For service to the community of the Mornington Peninsula.
- James Kenneth Arbuckle – For service to community health.
- The late Dr Trevor James Arbuckle RFD – For service to the community, and to youth.
- Professor Peta Ashworth – For service to science in the field of sustainable energy.
- Major Michael Wells Askey RFD ED (Retd) – For service to veterans and their families.
- Peter Astridge – For service to local government, and to the community of Hunter's Hill.
- Damien Leigh Atkinson – For service to youth.
- Margaret Colville Attley – For service to local government, and to the community of Mansfield.
- Alwyn Robert Backwell – For service to youth through Scouts.
- The Reverend Barbara Boyd Bailey – For service to the Uniting Church in Australia.
- Sister Patricia Caroline Bailey – For service to education, particularly for deaf and hearing-impaired children.
- Douglas Lindsay Baird – For service to veterans and their families.
- Ronald George Baker – For service to the community through a range of organisations.
- Margaret Joyce Baker-Dawber – For service to the performing arts.
- Nancy Vanette Baldock – For service to community history.
- Frayn Barker – For service to early childhood education.
- Leanne Barnes – For service to water polo.
- Michael Edgar Bartlett – For service to surf lifesaving.
- Henry Vivian Bath – For service to the community of Cedar Pocket.
- Michael Robert Beatty – For service to animal welfare.
- Rodney Graham Benness – For service to the community, particularly through social welfare initiatives.
- Violet Merle Bennett – For service to conservation and the environment.
- David Leslie Bennett – For service to rugby league.
- Vivienne Bensky – For service to the Jewish community of Perth.
- Ernest Lionel Bentley – For service to the communities of Millicent and Beachport.
- The Honourable Archibald Ronald Bevis – For service to the Parliament of Australia.
- Judith Maree Bibby – For service to the community of Drouin.
- Vincent Michael Bibby – For service to the community of Drouin.
- Carrie Bickmore – For service to the broadcast media, and to brain cancer awareness.
- Zygmunt Henryk Bielinski – For service to the Polish community of Victoria.
- Dr Michael Thomas Biggs – For service to medicine as a neurosurgeon.
- John Black – For service to the community through a range of organisations.
- Mary Catherine Blackford – For service to aged welfare.
- Christine Angela Bloomer – For service to the community of Roleystone.
- Nicole Maree Bolger – For service to nursing.
- Brenda Lesley Booth – For service to community health.
- David Lawrence Borger – For service to the Parliament of New South Wales, and to local government.
- The late Guy Stuart Bowering – For service to veterans and their families.
- Pamela Bowmaker – For service to veterans and their families.
- Shelley June Boyce – For service to the community of the Southern Highlands.
- Carmela Bozzi – For service to the Italian community of Brisbane.
- Kenneth Bradley – For service to the community through a range of organisations.
- Mark John Brandon-Baker – For service to the community of Canberra.
- Vivien Margaret Brass – For service to the Jewish community.
- Ann Craig Brown – For service to the community of Palmerston.
- Phillip John Brown – For service to the community of Milton-Ulladulla.
- Carolyn Diane Brown – For service to the community through a range of organisations.
- Professor Christine Ann Brown – For service to education.
- Anna Shelley Brown – For service to human rights, and to the LGBTIQ community.
- Geraldine Mary Brown – For service to badminton.
- Kim Frances Brundle-Lawrence – For service to the community of Northern Tasmania.
- Doreen Edna Bryars – For service to the performing arts, particularly as a musical director.
- Robert Buchanan – For service to the maritime transport industry.
- Graeme Lambden Budd – For service to the community through a range of organisations.
- Dr Leonard John Burtenshaw – For service to music education.
- Adrienne Margaret Cahalan – For service to sailing.
- Helen Joy Cahill – For service to the community of Inner West Sydney.
- The late Janice Gabrielle Cameron – For service to swimming, particularly as a coach.
- David Joseph Campbell – For service to entertainment and the arts.
- Robert Baylis Campbell RFD ED – For service to veterans and their families.
- Barbara Jayne Campbell-Allen – For service to the creative arts as a potter and ceramicist.
- Bruce Cant – For service to the community of Wauchope.
- Margot Capp – For service to the community of Gresford.
- Lella Cariddi – For service to community history.
- Bernard James Carney – For service to music.
- John Carrangis – For service to the community of Rosefield.
- John Angus Carroll – For service to sailing.
- Patricia Mary Carroll – For service to education, and to people with a disability.
- Dr Joan Patricia Castle – For service to medicine.
- Constantino Aka-Tino Ceberano – For service to karate.
- Dr Richard Wainin Chan – For service to dentistry.
- John Nicholas Chant – For service to the community of the Goulburn Valley.
- The Reverend Linda Jane Chapman – For service to the Anglican Church of Australia.
- Phillip John Chapman – For service to the community of Ballina.
- Antonios (Tony) Charbel – For service to the Lebanese community of Victoria.
- Gloria Jean Chay – For service to the community of Maryborough.
- Vincent Harold Chay – For service to the community of Maryborough.
- June Alison Cherrey – For service to the community.
- Carolyn Jane Clark – For service to women, and to the community.
- Peter John Clews – For service to the community of Cowaramup.
- Dr Fiona Maragaret Cochrane – For service to the visual arts as an independent film producer.
- Lorraine Ann Cochrane – For service to the community through charitable initiatives.
- Major Anthony Cockburn – For service to youth.
- Wayne Maxwell Cole – For service to surf lifesaving.
- Norman Richard Coleman – For service to veterans and their families.
- Gavan David Collery – For service to the mining industry.
- Alan Charles Collier – For service to the community of Dandenong.
- Eileen Collins – For service to conservation and the environment.
- Anne Margaret Conway – For service to the community of Bendigo.
- Robyn Coombes – For service to horse sports, and to people with a disability.
- Arthur John Coorey – For service to rugby league, and to the community.
- Trevor John Corbell – For service to the community through a range of organisations.
- Robert Donald Corbett – For service to the community through emergency response organisations.
- John Cyril Corby – For service to the aviation industry.
- The late The Honourable Dr John Robert Cornwall – For service to the Parliament of South Australia, and to the community.
- William Martin Corten – For service to the maritime recreation industry.
- Margot Joy Cory-Wall – For service to the performing arts, particularly to opera.
- Maureen Costello – For service to veterans and their families.
- Mackay James Cott – For service to the print media as an editor and journalist.
- Jennifer Zoe Cowley – For service to the community through a range of organisations.
- Dr Raymond Maxwell Cowling – For service to community health.
- Suzan Cox QC – For service to the law.
- Marilyn Barbara Crabtree – For service to aged welfare.
- Lorraine Margaret Crawford – For service to basketball.
- The Honourable Murray John Criddle – For service to the Parliament of Western Australia.
- Dr Michelle Ann Crockett – For service to medicine.
- Jack Crombie – For service to the Indigenous community of South Australia.
- Gwenyth Mary Crombie – For service to the Indigenous community of South Australia.
- Andrew John Cross – For service to the community of Walcha.
- Peter Leslie Cullerne – For service to veterans and their families.
- Valda Merle Cuming – For service to the visual arts.
- Dr Christopher James Cunneen – For service to medicine as an occupational and environmental physician.
- Janice Margaret Currie-Henderson – For service to Irish dancing.
- Professor Jane Esther Dahlstrom – For service to medical education, and to pathology.
- Shirley Alice Davies – For service to the community through a range of roles.
- Suzanne Davies – For service to the community through social welfare organisations.
- Dr Janice Davies – For service to community health.
- Ernest Frederick Dawes OBE – For service to the community.
- John Charles De Cean – For service to surf lifesaving.
- Frank De Rosso – For service to music.
- Robyn De Szoeke – For service to women through charitable initiatives.
- Gerard De Vries – For service to the community through emergency response organisations.
- Regula (Ria) Deamer – For service to medical education administration.
- Leslie Charles Dempsey – For service to entertainment and the arts.
- Christopher John Denny – For service to the community through a range of organisations.
- Associate Professor Michael Joseph Denton – For service to medicine as a vascular surgeon.
- Dr George Peter Deutsch – For service to the community through a range of roles.
- David John Devers – For service to the community through charitable initiatives.
- Peter John Devoy – For service to the community through charitable initiatives.
- Tony Antoun Dib – For service to local government, and to the community of Maroondah.
- Maureen Joy Dillon – For service to the community of the Northern Beaches of Sydney.
- Dr Malcolm Douglas Dobbin – For service to medicine.
- Ross Peter Doddridge – For service to the community through a range of organisations.
- Anita Dodds – For service to international law enforcement education.
- Roger James Donsworth – For service to the community through a range of organisations.
- Lindsay William Drake – For service to aged welfare.
- Audrey Drechsler – For service to agriculture, and to the community.
- Gregory John Drew – For service to mining as an historian.
- Dr Geraldine Frances Duncan – For service to rural medicine.
- Faye Edith Dunn – For service to the community through charitable initiatives.
- Stanley John Dunstan – For service to the community of Yarrawonga Mulwala.
- Rodney Victor Dux – For service to the community of the Gold Coast.
- Kim Louise Eckert – For service to the community of Kalgoorlie-Boulder.
- Leon George Eddy – For service to veterans and their families.
- Brian Lawrance Edwards – For service to surf lifesaving.
- Patsy Loretto Edwards – For service to veterans and their families.
- Jennifer Elizabeth Ejlak – For service to the community through women's health initiatives.
- Jeanette Mary Elliott – For service to the community of Mount Gambier.
- The Reverend Kevin Francis Engel – For service to the Anglican Church of Australia.
- Katharine Elizabeth England – For service to literature.
- Dr John Dacre England – For service to medicine as a cardiologist.
- Louise Margaret Evans – For service to the media, particularly sports reporting.
- Laurence Evans – For service to local government, and to the community of Sandringham.
- Patricia Evans – For service to women through charitable initiatives.
- Joyce Olga Evans – For service to photography.
- John Evans – For service to the tourism industry, and to rail history, in South Australia.
- June Lorraine Evans – For service to the community of Oberon.
- Dr David Everett – For service to medicine as a paediatrician.
- Kenneth Charles Eynon – For service to athletics.
- Margaret Sydney Ezzy – For service to the community of Taree.
- Robert Leo Fahey – For service to Real Tennis.
- The late John Thomas Fahy – For service to National Wattle Day celebrations.
- Anne Farah-Hill – For service to the community through social welfare organisations.
- Raymond John Farrelly – For service to civil engineering.
- Dr Peter Hector Faulkner – For service to medicine through a range of roles.
- Joan Evelyn Fazackerley – For service to the community of Nubeena.
- The Honourable Laurie Donald Ferguson – For service to parliament and politics, and to the community.
- May Dorothy Ferrier – For service to the community of Birchip.
- Dr Frank Fisher – For service to community health.
- The late Moshe Majer Fiszman – For service to the Jewish community.
- John McKenzie Fleming – For service to the community of Wonthaggi.
- The late John Baden Fletcher – For service to horse racing.
- Caroline Patricia Flynn – For service to the community through a range of organisations.
- Robert Henry Flynn – For service to the community through a range of organisations.
- Kerith Ann Fowles – For service to music, and to the community of the Southern Highlands.
- Sally Bronwyn Francis – For service to horse sports, and to people with a disability.
- Antonia Frances Francis – For service to the community of Peak Hill.
- Robert Bruce Freeman – For service to the community through faith-based organisations.
- Peter Thomas Funnell – For service to hockey.
- James Andrew Gable – For service to veterans and their families.
- Shirley-Anne Gale – For service to music.
- Robert Andrew Gallagher – For service to rail transport modelling.
- James Morison Gardiner – For service to the community through LGBTIQ and human rights organisations.
- Dr Kirsty Gardner-Berry – For service to audiology.
- Alexander Gelman – For service to the community through charitable initiatives.
- The late Joseph Eric Gelston – For service to amateur radio.
- Lydia Gentle – For service to engineering.
- Frederick Richard Gibbs – For service to the community of Balwyn.
- James Stephen Gibson – For service to rowing.
- Elizabeth Leigh Giffard – For service to nursing.
- Joan Edith Gilbert – For service to the community, and to the Anglican Church of Australia.
- Dr Robert Gillies – For service to the community through charitable initiatives.
- William Wordsworth Gilmour – For service to the community through charitable initiatives.
- Robert Gary Giltinan – For service to tennis, and to the community of the Northern Beaches.
- Kenneth James Gloster – For service to lawn bowls.
- Alfred Leslie Goldburg – For service to veterans and their families, and to the community.
- Theresa Christina Gomboc – For service to the museums and galleries sector.
- Gary James Gooch – For service to the agricultural show sector.
- Eleanore Goodridge – For service to the community through charitable initiatives.
- Sean Patrick Gordon – For service to the community through a range of organisations.
- Helen Gwendoline Gordon – For service to community health as a physiotherapist.
- Mervyn Clyde Gordon – For service to the community through a range of organisations.
- Clare Norma Gray – For service to community health.
- Dr Sylwia Malgorzata Greda-Bogusz – For service to the Polish community of Victoria.
- Roger William Greene – For service to veterans and their families.
- Margaret Fanny Greenwood – For service to the community of East Gippsland.
- Dr Wayne Gregson APM – For service to the community through emergency response organisations.
- Mark Lee Gribble – For service to the community through emergency response organisations.
- Roland Errol Gridiger – For service to the performing arts through administrative roles.
- Timothy John Grieger – For service to the agricultural show sector.
- Joan Isabel Grigg – For service to conservation and the environment.
- Dr Terry Robert Grigg – For service to community health.
- Douglas Howard Grigg – For service to the community through emergency response organisations.
- Alain Maurice Grossbard – For service to the community through a range of organisations.
- Brian Robert Haddy – For service to science education.
- Kenneth John Halstead – For service to local government, and to engineering.
- Paul Andrew Hameister – For service to exploration, and to business.
- Jade Elisabeth Hameister – For service to polar exploration.
- Keith Lionel Hamilton – For service to the community of Lismore.
- Mervyn Arthur Hampson – For service to veterans and their families.
- Robert John Handley – For service to the community through a range of organisations.
- Lorna Margaret Hannan – For service to the community through a range of organisations.
- Peter Barry Hardham – For service to the law, and to the community.
- Colin Stuart Harding – For service to the community through a range of organisations.
- Michael John Harding – For service to the construction industry.
- Peter Eric Harley – For service to the community of Freshwater.
- Jennifer Leigh Harris – For service to conservation and the environment.
- Graeme Edward Harris – For service to the community of Donald.
- Tony Tasman Harrison – For service to cricket.
- Claude Lyle Harvey – For service to the community through charitable initiatives.
- Pauline Lesley Harvey-Short – For service to sport, and to education.
- Darren Stanley Hayes – For service to music as a songwriter and performer.
- Angela Rosemary Hazebroek – For service to town planning.
- Dr Samuel Russell Heard – For service to medicine.
- Kevin George Hein – For service to the performing arts, and to the community of Mount Gambier.
- Ralph Edward Heness – For service to the community of Auburn.
- Gwenda Elaine Herbert – For service to photography.
- Elaine Jean Heskett – For service to the community through a range of roles.
- Sally Maree Hetherington – For service to the international community through charitable initiatives.
- Martin Blay Hewson – For service to the community of Murringo.
- Maria Lucile Hicks – For service to the international community through humanitarian aid.
- Geoffrey Eric Hicks – For service to the community through emergency response organisations.
- Stephen John Higgs – For service to education.
- Ivan Hinton-Teoh – For service to human rights, and to the LGBTIQ community.
- Lynette Gail Hipwell – For service to youth through Scouts.
- Dr Quang Phu Ho – For service to medicine in the field of obstetrics and gynaecology.
- Neroli Ann Hobbins – For service to the performing arts through administrative roles.
- Una Margaret Hobday – For service to the community through a range of organisations.
- Daryl Keith Hocking – For service to diving.
- Beverly Jean Hoffmann – For service to sport, and to the community of Dimboola.
- Desmond John Hogan – For service to rugby union.
- Gordon James Holland – For service to veterans and their families.
- Christopher David Holstein – For service to local government, and to the community of Gosford.
- Roger William Hounslow – For service to the community through accessible legal services.
- Wendy Dorothy Hughes – For service to the community of Gloucester.
- Barbara Lillian Hughes – For service to the community of Ballarat.
- Joyce Irene Hyles – For service to the community of Bungendore and Queanbeyan.
- Dr Samir Nicolas Ibrahim – For service to psychiatry, and to the community.
- Warren Arthur Irwin – For service to science education.
- Dr Kimberley Alan Jaggar – For service to secondary education.
- Ian John James – For service to music publishing and rights.
- Reginald Joseph Jamieson – For service to the community of Moree.
- David Victor Jensz – For service to education, and to the community of Manningham.
- Paul Jevtovic APM – For service to financial crime enforcement and regulation.
- Greg John Jones – For service to local government, and to the community of North Queensland.
- Margaret Ann Jopling – For service to the community of Kempsey.
- Kevin Charles Kaeser – For service to rugby union.
- William Ernest Kaine MBE – For service to veterans and their families.
- Leslie Julius Kausman – For service to sport, and to the community.
- The Reverend Marjorie Kathleen Keeble – For service to the community of Hamilton.
- Patricia Ann Keith – For service to the community through a range of organisations.
- David William Kelly – For service to veterans and their families.
- Shirley Myra Kelynack – For service to the community through a range of organisations.
- Raymond John Kemp – For service to veterans and their families.
- Anthony Gerard Kennedy – For service to the community through a range of organisations.
- Peter Richard Kenyon – For service to community development initiatives.
- Antony William Keynes – For service to athletics.
- Christine Dawson Kibble – For service to the community through a range of organisations.
- Myles Graham King – For service to the community through a range of organisations.
- John Joseph King – For service to rugby league.
- Suzanne Kingsford – For service to horticulture.
- Peter Barton Kirkwood – For service to the community of northern Sydney.
- Martin Henry Klumpp – For service to cricket.
- Valda Marie Knott – For service to the community of Trayning.
- Shashi Kant Kochhar – For service to the community through charitable initiatives.
- Margaret Jan Koperberg – For service to community history.
- Raymond Arthur Koschel – For service to the community of Finley.
- Susan Penelope Labordus-Taylor – For service to Australia-Britain relations.
- Toni Louise Lalich – For service to the performing arts, particularly music.
- Edna Lillian Lamb – For service to the community through a range of organisations.
- Margot Elizabeth Lampkin – For service to choral music.
- Dierdre Elizabeth Landells – For service to the community of Narooma.
- Robert George Langbein – For service to surf lifesaving.
- Regis Pierre Lansac – For service to photography and to visual design.
- Stephen Francis Larkins – For service to the community, and to veterans.
- Denise Lawrence – For service to music education.
- Mary Virginia Lawrey – For service to primary education.
- Lynette Lorraine Leahey – For service to veterans and their families.
- Richard Alexander Leder – For service to the community through charitable organisations.
- Anthony Reginald Lee – For service to youth.
- Clement Lee – For service to architecture, and to philanthropy.
- Joanne Frances Lee Dow – For service to education.
- James Andrew Lerk – For service to history, and to the community of Bendigo.
- Bruce Levet – For service to the law in New South Wales.
- Walter Lew Fatt – For service to Australian rules football, and to the community of Darwin.
- Suzanne Ellen Lewis – For service to diving.
- Zhaoran Li – For service to the Chinese community of Melbourne.
- The late Audrey Valerie Light – For service to the community through social welfare organisations.
- Geoffrey Frederick Limmer – For service to the communities of Whitehorse and Maroondah.
- Dr James Macpherson Linklater – For service to medicine, particularly as a radiologist.
- Sean William Linkson – For service to human rights, and to the LGBTIQ community.
- The late Susan Catherine Lloyd – For service to public administration in Western Australia, and to the law.
- Roger William Lord – For service to people with a disability through sport, and to the community.
- Ian Norman Lunt – For service to the community of Albany.
- Graham Edwin Lupp – For service to community history in Bathurst.
- Maxine Joyce Mackay – For service to the Indigenous community of Bourke.
- Colette Elizabeth Mackay – For service to the community of the Australian Capital Territory.
- Andrew D'Arcy Macqueen – For service to conservation and the environment.
- Paul Thomas Madden – For service to primary industry, and to the community of the Riverina.
- Robert Magid – For service to business and commerce, and to the Jewish community.
- Marianne Mahony (Whittington) – For service to the community through social welfare programs.
- Peter Francis Maishman – For service to surf lifesaving.
- Alfio Manciagli – For service to photography.
- Patti Manolis – For service to the library and information sciences sector.
- Tasia Manos – For service to the Greek community of Victoria.
- David Paul Marshall – For service to the community of Harvey.
- Amanda Martin – For service to conservation and the environment.
- Philip Michael Martin – For service to Australian rules football, and to the community.
- Dr David Keith Martin – For service to medicine in the field of orthopaedics.
- Samuel Peter Mattey – For service to local government, and to the community.
- Donald Alexander Mayes – For service to community music.
- Clement Paul McArdle – For service to veterans and their families.
- David James McCann – For service to the community of Coolamon.
- Keith Raymond McDonald – For service to conservation and the environment.
- William Alexander McDonald – For service to the community, and to business.
- Colonel Alan Martin McDonald (Retd) – For service to veterans and their families.
- Eileen McDonald – For service to the community of Mount Alexander, and to apiculture.
- Dr David Thomas McDonald – For service to medicine as a paediatrician.
- Karin Therese McGann – For service to the community through Lions Clubs Australia.
- William James McGill – For service to the community through a range of roles.
- Laurence Stuart McGinty – For service to the community through a range of roles.
- Alfred Charles McGrath PSM – For service to veterans and their families.
- Karen McIntyre – For service to the community of Lake Bolac.
- Elizabeth Jean McKay – For service to the community of Camberwell.
- James Ashley McKay – For service to horse sports.
- Kristy Lee McKellar – For service to the community through social welfare initiatives.
- Ian Maxwell McLeod – For service to the community of Lockhart.
- Mary McLure – For service to the community through a range of roles.
- Ian Verco McMichael – For service to community health in rural areas.
- Clement Raymond McNamara – For service to the community through social welfare programs.
- Peter Anthony McNamara – For service to veterans and their families.
- Jack McNaughton – For service to the community through charitable organisations.
- Judith Mary McNay – For service to veterans and their families.
- Kelvin McWhinnie – For service to the live entertainment industry.
- Arthur John Medcalf – For service to local government, and to the community of Tottenham.
- Ian Edwin Meek – For service to the community of Belrose.
- Sally Melhuish – For service to baroque music.
- Anthony Gerrard Mellick – For service to cricket and rugby union.
- Major Heather Dawn Merrick – For service to the community through the Salvation Army.
- Lisa Michl Ko-Manggen – For service to Indigenous visual arts.
- Carol Ann Miell – For service to the community through marine rescue organisations.
- Allan Miles – For service to military history.
- Elaine Lucy Millar – For service to the community of Gisborne.
- Margaret Mary (Megg) Miller – For service to the poultry industry.
- Ian Colwell Miller – For service to the community through a range of organisations.
- Kylie Shae Mines – For service to disabled people in the Asia-Pacific region.
- Eric Mitchell – For service to music education.
- Parivash Mofid – For service to the Persian community of Sydney, and to education.
- Helen Ann Montague – For service to the community of Boisdale.
- Anna Moo – For service to social welfare, particularly in migrant communities.
- Wendy Moore – For service to the international community of Nepal.
- Dr Mary Moran – For service to medical research, and to global health initiatives.
- Lindsay Keith Morgan – For service to the communities of Ulverstone and northwestern Tasmania.
- David Scott Morgan – For service to education, and to the community.
- Elizabeth Sue Morley – For service to the law, and to the community.
- William John Mountford – For service to veterans and their families.
- Jenny Mulholland – For service to local government, and to the community of Banyule.
- John Anthony Munckton – For service to the community of Seymour.
- Janet Mackenzie Muspratt – For service to horse sports.
- Dr Krishna Dhana Nadimpalli – For service to multiculturalism in the Australian Capital Territory.
- Nicholas Nadycz – For service to the community of Harden-Murrumburrah.
- Noel Nannup – For service to the Indigenous community of Western Australia.
- Dr William Nardi – For service to medicine in the field of ophthalmology.
- Margaret Reece Nash – For service to tennis.
- Kevin John Neilson – For service to surf lifesaving.
- Graeme McCann Nelson – For service to the community of Rochester.
- Peter Herbert Nettelbeck – For service to the community of Gawler.
- The late Michael Neuhauser – For service to the Jewish community of Melbourne.
- Anita Newman – For service to youth, and to the community of Darwin.
- Clement Arundel Newton-Brown – For service to the Parliament of Victoria, and to the community of Melbourne.
- Vasiliki Nihas-Bogiatzis – For service to the arts and cultural heritage.
- Dr Robert Stevenson (Steven) Nisbet – For service to the community through music, and to education.
- Lynette Mary Nitschke – For service to the community, particularly through victim support.
- Kathryn Susan Nolan – For service to the international community through humanitarian aid.
- Charles Richard Norris – For service to cricket, and to the community.
- Dianne Edna North – For service to the community of the Illawarra.
- David Ernest North – For service to the community of the Illawarra.
- Elizabeth North – For service to the communities of Torquay and Geelong.
- Margaret Ann Nunn – For service to the community through St John Ambulance.
- James Andrew O'Brien – For service to people with a disability through sport.
- Daniel Leonard O'Connor – For service to the law, and to the community.
- Patricia Marjorie O'Hara – For service to nursing.
- Harriet Margaret O'Malley – For service to Australia-France relations.
- Gregory Kevin O'Neill – For service to business, and to basketball.
- Dr Gregory Francis O'Sullivan – For service to medicine in the field of anaesthesiology.
- Squadron Leader Gary William Oakley – For service to the Indigenous community through a range of organisations.
- Noel James Olive – For service to the Indigenous community, to history, and to the arts.
- Kerry John Olsen – For service to the community through charitable initiatives.
- Craig Andrew Opie – For service to the tourism industry in Victoria, and to the community.
- Laurelle Doris Pacey – For service to community history.
- Robert Pack – For service to health, and to the community of Townsville.
- Stephen John Padgett – For service to the aviation industry.
- John Edwin Paisley – For service to emergency response organisations, and to the community of Wyrallah.
- Colin Palmer – For service to youth.
- Vivien Elma Palmer – For service to education, and to the community.
- Eric Ernest Panther – For service to genealogy.
- Bill Papastergiadis – For service to the Greek Orthodox community of Victoria.
- Jill Parker – For service to local government, and to the community of South West Victoria.
- Allan James Parker – For service to business, particularly to dispute resolution.
- Malcolm David Parks – For service to the community of Bayside.
- Alan James Parr – For service to veterans.
- Graeme Leslie Pascoe – For service to the community through Lions Clubs Australia.
- James Lawrence Pascoe – For service to the community of Dubbo.
- Pastor Margaret Ann Pashley – For service to the international community of the Philippines.
- Kevin Thomas Pattel – For service to the livestock transport industry.
- Kenneth James Paul – For service to architecture, and to the community.
- Associate Professor Georgia Armat Paxton – For service to community health, and to refugees.
- Susanne Haydon Pearce – For service to children's charitable organisations, and to the community.
- Joanne Lorraine Pearson – For service to nursing, and to the community.
- Robert Edward Peattie – For service to the community through a range of roles.
- John Anthony Perry – For service to the community through social welfare organisations.
- Kathleen Joy Peters – For service to the entertainment industry on the Gold Coast.
- Dr Patricia Gloria Phair – For service to women, to medical research, and to the community.
- Michele Jan Phillips – For service to wildlife conservation.
- Walter Leslie Pike – For service to the community of Bunbury.
- Stanley Robert Plath – For service to education, and to youth sporting initiatives.
- Warren Polglase – For service to local government, and to the community of Tweed River.
- Eleanor Mary Pollard – For service to the community of Wycheproof.
- Richard Poon – For service to the community through emergency response organisations.
- The late Roy William Preece – For service to the community through social welfare organisations.
- Terry John Prosser – For service to canoeing.
- Kerry Pamela Pryor – For service to photography, and to international charitable initiatives.
- Bernard James Pryor – For service to horticulture, and to the community.
- Marjorie Elizabeth Quinn – For service to the community, to social welfare organisations, and to education.
- Major Francis Roy Radford CSM (Retd) – For service to veterans and their families.
- Jayshree Ramachandran – For service to the performing arts through Indian music and dance.
- George Lewis Raphael – For service to the community through a range of roles.
- Eva Rathner – For service to the Jewish community of Victoria.
- David Richard Reeves – For service to the performing arts, particularly through music composition.
- Marlene Reid – For service to women, and to the community.
- Rhonda Marilyn Renwick – For service to the community through charitable organisations.
- Yvonne Repin – For service to music.
- Trevor Walter Richards – For service to the tourism industry in Morpeth.
- Kathleen May Rieth — For service to community history.
- Kenrick Riley — For service to the livestock industry.
- Jennifer Elisabeth Roberts — For service to the community, particularly to youth.
- Margaret Daphne Robinson — For service to the community of Ballarat.
- Cecily Enid Rogers — For service to horticulture, and to floral art.
- John Lindsay Rogers — For service to veterans and their families.
- Sally Rose — For service to community health.
- Jose Manuel Roses — For service to karate.
- Kenneth James Rowe PSM — For service to the community of Frankston.
- Garry Alan Runge — For service to local government, and to the community.
- Margaret Joan Russell — For service to the community through a range of organisations.
- Judith Jocelyn Rutherford — For service to the community of Bathurst.
- Diana Geraldine Rynkiewicz — For service to people with Parkinson's disease.
- Khodr Saleh — For service to the community of Canterbury Bankstown.
- Dr Milton Arthur Sales — For service to medicine, and to the community.
- Adele Saliba — For service to the community through charitable initiatives.
- Louise Janette Saunders — For service to wildlife conservation, and to the visual arts.
- Ruth Scheuer — For service to the Jewish community of Victoria.
- Dr Michael Andrew Scobie — For service to ophthalmology, and to the community.
- Eric Raymond Scoble — For service to the community of Kyneton.
- The late Mr Alfred Harry Scott — For service to the community of Moree.
- Peta Searle — For service to Australian rules football.
- Juliet Seifert — For service to the pharmaceutical and therapeutic goods sectors.
- Douglas Anthony Seymour — For service to the community of Warrandyte.
- Sister Mary Margaret Shanahan — For service to tertiary education, and as a mentor of young students.
- Barbara Clare Shepley — For service to the community of Newcastle.
- Peter James Sheppard — For service to the retail footwear sector.
- The Reverend Father Robert Joseph Sheridan — For service to the Catholic Church of Australia.
- The late Mr John Stewart Shirley — For service to the community of Kyogle.
- Gail Patricia Shorthouse — For service to the international community of Papua New Guinea.
- Kevin James Shorthouse — For service to the international community of Papua New Guinea.
- Catharina Slot — For service to dog agility sports.
- Paul Barrie Smart — For service to the community of Geelong.
- Dr Ronald Edwin Smart PSM — For service to music, and to the international community of Sierra Leone.
- David Ross Smith — For service to skydiving.
- Jessica Tace Smith — For service to the community through a range of roles.
- Lynden James Smith — For service to the communities of Geelong and Ararat.
- Stafford Robert Smith — For service to surf lifesaving, and to education.
- Suzanne Lesley Solvyns — For service to community health.
- Sheryl Joycelyn Southwood — For service to music through a range of organisations.
- Christopher Sparks — For service to people with a disability.
- William Michael Sparks — For service to community health.
- Robin Roy Speed — For service to the law.
- Kelvin Laurence Spiller — For service to local government.
- Robyn Anne Spruce — For service to veterans and their families.
- Robert Eric Steel — For service to surveying.
- Kaye Steer — For service to the community through hospital auxiliaries.
- Samuel Steif — For service to the Jewish community.
- Bronwyn Elizabeth Stephens — For service to the community of South Melbourne.
- Jill Elizabeth Stevenson — For service to the community through a range of organisations.
- Daniel Gargett Stewart — For service to surf lifesaving.
- Dr Penelope Clare Stewart — For service to medicine in the field of emergency and intensive care.
- Glen Reginald Stiles — For service to the community of Logan.
- Frank Anthony Stivala — For service to the music industry.
- Richard Llewellyn Stone — For service to veterans and their families.
- Anthony George Strahan — For service to surf lifesaving.
- Dr Robert John Stunden — For service to medicine in the field of paediatric surgery.
- John McAdam Sullivan — For service to the community through a range of organisations.
- Leslie Rupert Sumner — For service to the community of Cobden.
- Colin James Sutcliffe — For service to the community of Capalaba, and to education.
- Kenneth Sutcliffe — For service to the broadcast media, particularly to television.
- The Honourable Michael William Sutherland — For service to the Parliament of Western Australia, and to local government.
- William Barry Swan — For service to the mining sector.
- Kathleen Dawn Swansbra — For service to decorative food arts.
- Lisa Maria Sweeney — For service to the broadcast media, particularly to radio.
- Austin Robert Taylor — For service to education, and to community health.
- Pauline Rochelle Tees — For service to the community through charitable initiatives.
- The Honourable Martin James Tenni — For service to the Parliament of Queensland, and to the community.
- Eric Serge Thauvette — For service to people with a disability.
- The late Mr Keith George Thomas — For service to the community of Warburton.
- James Leslie Thompson — For service to the community of Swan Hill.
- Dr Douglas Keith Thornton — For service to dentistry in the field of oral and maxillofacial surgery.
- The late Mr Robert Thurling — For service to the community of Goulburn.
- Lester Wayne Thurston — For service to the community of Tooraweenah.
- Judy Tierney — For service to the print and broadcast media as a journalist.
- Elliott William Titley — For service to veterans and their families.
- Beryl Bryant Tobin — For service to golf.
- Doreen Helen Todd — For service to women.
- Edward Ernest Tonks — For service to community history, and to education.
- Dr Deborah Jane Towns — For service to education, and to gender equity.
- Dr Anatoly (Tony) Trachtenberg — For service to medicine, particularly as a general practitioner.
- Donald Philip Tregonning — For service to tennis.
- Jeremy Hugh Trevor-Jones — For service to aviation.
- Michael Leslie Tuohy — For service to the community of Mount Gambier.
- Jeffrey Walter Turner — For service to community history.
- Robert Alfred Uppill — For service to the community of Manning.
- Donald John van Keimpema — For service to surf lifesaving.
- Dr Vida Viliunas — For service to medicine in the field of anaesthesiology.
- Julia Helen Volkmar — For service to community history.
- David Maxwell Waddle — For service to veterans and their families.
- Patricia May Walker — For service to the community of Moore Park Beach.
- Graeme Alexander Wall — For service to the performing arts, particularly to opera.
- John Richard Wall — For service to horticulture.
- Betty Jean Wallace — For service to people with a disability, and to the community.
- Beverley Laura Walsh — For service to surf lifesaving.
- Maureen Patricia Wandel — For service to the community of Underbool through sport.
- Mervyn Arnold Ward — For service to youth.
- Kerry Raymond Waters — For service to the community of Corryong.
- Leolyn Clem Watkins — For service to the community of Ararat.
- Christopher Alan Watson — For service to engineering.
- Dr Judyth Watson — For service to the community of Western Australia, and to social justice.
- Bernadette Waugh — For service to librarianship.
- Ellen Margaret Waugh — For service to community history, and to arts education.
- Dr Russell Frederick Waugh — For service to the community of Perth.
- Margaret Bell Wells — For service to veterans and their families
- Barbara Wertheim — For service to women.
- Mabel Anita West — For service to veterans and their families.
- Robert Ernest Wharton — For service to the community, particularly through sport.
- Diane Elizabeth White — For service to community history.
- George Henry White — For service to children.
- Gordon Eustace White — For service to medicine, particularly sexual health.
- Hunter Baillieu White — For service to the agricultural show sector, and to the community.
- John Ronald White APM — For service to community history.
- David Symon Wilkins — For service to community history.
- Ada Ellen Wilkinson — For service to youth through Scouts.
- Caroline Wilkinson — For service to community history.
- Dr George Louie Williams — For service to medicine in the field of paediatrics and developmental disability.
- Reginald Williams — For service to the Indigenous community of Queensland.
- Roger Gilronan Williams — For service to the community through social welfare programs.
- Ross Francis Williams — For service to the community through social welfare organisations.
- Arthur John Wilson — For service to Australian rules football.
- Doreen Margaret Wilson — For service to gymnastics.
- Lynette Faye Woodforde — For service to community health.
- Jill Florimel Worsley — For service to maritime history.
- Peter Thomas Worsley — For service to maritime history.
- Alan Wright — For service to the minerals and mining sector.
- Dr Adam Mark Zagorski — For service to medicine as a general practitioner.
- Petrina Zaphir — For service to the community of the Gold Coast.
- Dr Edward Ye Zhang — For service to the Chinese community of Western Australia.
- John William Zimmermann — For service to youth.

==== Military Division ====
- Member A – For meritorious performance of duty as a Special Forces Officer in support of Australia's contribution to the Global War on Terror, from November 2010 to June 2018.
- Warrant Officer Dennis Bentley CSM – For meritorious performance of duty in the field of personnel management in the Royal Australian Navy.
- Warrant Officer Class One Jason Ross Burford – For meritorious service as the Senior Instructor of the Australian Army's Warrant Officer Training Team and as a Regimental Sergeant Major.
- Major C – For meritorious service to the Australian Defence Force within Special Operations Command.
- Major Jeffrey Cocks – For meritorious achievement as the Officer Commanding and music director of the Australian Army Band - Brisbane, and as the Executive Officer of the Australian Army Band.
- Lieutenant Commander Nathan Lindsay Cole RAN – For meritorious service in the field of maritime communications and Information Systems support.
- Chief Petty Officer Cameron Devenny – For meritorious service to the Royal Australian Navy's Boatswains Mate Workgroup and meritorious devotion to duty as Chief Petty Officer Boatswain HMAS Hobart.
- Warrant Officer James Retif Dew – For meritorious service to the Navy during the development and introduction into service of the Canberra Class Amphibious Ship capability.
- Warrant Officer Class One Bradley Michael Doyle – For meritorious service as Regimental Sergeant Major of 1st/19th Battalion, the Royal New South Wales Regiment; as Regimental Sergeant Major of 3rd Battalion, the Royal Australian Regiment; and as Regimental Sergeant Major of Training Task Group Five on Operation OKRA.
- Commander Robert Douglas Eames RAN – For meritorious service in the fields of international engagement and capability management.
- Warrant Officer Fiona Jane Grasby – For meritorious service in the development of leadership and workforce resilience for the Australian Defence Force as a Warrant Officer in Number 82 Wing, the Executive Warrant Officer of Number 95 Wing, and as the Executive Warrant Officer of Air Command.
- Major John Gordon Haley – For meritorious performance of duty in the fields of employment category management, training management and logistics capability development.
- Wing Commander Jeffrey Howard – For meritorious service in airfield engineering and air base recovery for the Australian Defence Force.
- Warrant Officer Class One J – For meritorious service to Special Operations Command from 2012 to 2018.
- Captain Mark Gregory McConnell RANR – For meritorious service to personnel management and shaping future people capability within the Royal Australian Navy.
- Warrant Officer Arthur Charles Mitcherson CSM – For meritorious performance of duty in the fields of Marine Engineering and technician training.
- Warrant Officer Class One Trent Rowan Morris – For meritorious service as Regimental Sergeant Major of the 2nd/17th Battalion, Royal New South Wales Regiment and the 2nd Battalion, The Royal Australian Regiment.
- Warrant Officer Brett Graham Nichols – For meritorious service in personnel capability development; prohibited substance testing; cultural change management; and training leadership in the Royal Australian Air Force.
- Captain Darren John Rae RAN – For meritorious service in the field of Naval Aviation Engineering.
- Warrant Officer Class One Mark Retallick CSM – For meritorious performance of duty to the Australian Army in regimental leadership roles.
- Warrant Officer Class One Michael John Reyne – For meritorious service as Regimental Sergeant Major of the 1st Battalion, the Royal Australian Regiment; the 10th/27th Battalion, the Royal South Australian Regiment; and as Wing Sergeant Major of the Small Arms Policy Section, Combined Arms Training Centre.
- Warrant Officer Kenneth George Robertson – For meritorious performance of duty on operations as the Command Warrant Officer of Joint Task Force 633, while deployed to the Middle East Region during the period January 2017 to January 2018.
- Warrant Officer Class One Jason Graham Robinson – For meritorious performance of duty as the Senior Assistant Instructor, School of Armour; Regimental Sergeant Major 12th/16th Hunter River Lancers; and Regimental Sergeant Major 1st Armoured Regiment.
- Warrant Officer Class One Stephen Norman Taylor – For meritorious service to the Royal Australian Corps of Military Police in regimental leadership roles and enhancing the Military Police Dog Capability.
- Warrant Officer Class One Charmaine Joan Walters – For meritorious service during several postings to Headquarters Joint Operations Command as the Warrant Officer Financial Services, the Group Reserve Manager and Base Operations Warrant Officer.

==== Honorary Division ====
- Peter Gerald Appleton – For service to the community of Kilmore.
- Geoffrey Gordon Brown – For service to the cotton industry, and to the community of Wee Waa.
- Pauline Elizabeth Davenport – For service to education.
- Frank Charles Fordyce – For service to the community, particularly through Freemasonry.
- Fiona Christine Tonkin – For service to the performing arts, particularly to ballet.

== Meritorious Service ==
=== Public Service Medal (PSM) ===
Public Service Medal ribbon

==== Commonwealth Public Service ====
- Dr Roslyn Kay Baxter – For outstanding public service through the design and implementation of social policy programs to improve the lives of vulnerable Australians.
- Robert John Bollard – For outstanding public service through the delivery of initiatives to improve IP Australia's customer services and processes.
- Ryan Alexander Fernando – For outstanding public service through improving the diagnosis and treatment of sleep apnoea.
- Sarah Jane Hitchcock – For outstanding public service through the development and delivery of visitor services programs at the Australian War Memorial.
- Michelle Anne Lauder – For outstanding public service to natural resource management and forest policy development and implementation.
- Hilary Margaret Manson – For outstanding public service to the long term protection of Australia's community interests as General Counsel.
- Nerida O'Loughlin – For outstanding public service through contributions to a more digital Australia and government.
- Mary Beatrice O'Reeri – For outstanding public service through contributions to improved outcomes for the Indigenous community, particularly in the Kimberley.
- Matthew Ramage – For outstanding public service through contributions to enhancing Australia's national security and economic prosperity.
- Olivia Samardzic – For outstanding public service in the application of science and technology to provide the Australian Defence Force with superior operational capability
- Peter John Searston – For outstanding public service through expanding employment and career opportunities for Aboriginal and Torres Strait Islander people in Northern Queensland.
- Beverley Maree Sims – For outstanding public service through the provision of executive support at the highest levels, and to fostering the development of public sector executive assistants.
- Jennifer Therese Taylor – For outstanding public service through the reform of Comcare and to improving compensation and workplace health and safety outcomes.

==== New South Wales Public Service ====
- Cathie Therese Angelkovic – For outstanding public service to Revenue New South Wales.
- Robyn Louise Auld – For outstanding public service to victims of domestic violence, and to the New South Wales Police Force.
- Lauri Jane Fettell – For outstanding public service in the provision of customer service delivery in New South Wales.
- Glennys Louise James – For outstanding public service to local government administration, and to town planning, in New South Wales.
- Dr Palitha Ranjith Kuruppuarachchi – For outstanding public service to the New South Wales Police Force, particularly to network communications.
- Gail Marie Le Bransky – For outstanding public service in the delivery of transport services in New South Wales.
- Donald Cameron Mclennan – For outstanding public service through the delivery of Coronial Services in New South Wales.
- Craig Carlisle Moffitt – For outstanding public service to local government in New South Wales.
- Janet Kathryn Schorer – For outstanding public service, particularly through the protection of children, in New South Wales.
- Ronald David Wright – For outstanding public service to skills development programs and infrastructure projects in New South Wales.

==== Victorian Public Service ====
- Ray Baird – For outstanding public service to technology-enabled policy and service delivery reform in Victoria.
- Jacqueline Ann Kearney – For outstanding public service to innovative policy design and service delivery in Victoria.
- Dr Rebecca Justine Kogios – For outstanding public service to forensic science and public administration in support of community safety in Victoria.
- Dr Lindy Lumsden – For outstanding public service to the conservation of native wildlife in Victoria.
- Peter Warwick Menkhorst – For outstanding public service to science and biodiversity conservation in Victoria.
- Alison Patricia O'Brien – For outstanding public service to the provision of legal services to the Victorian public sector, particularly in the areas of constitutional and public law.
- Wayne Ronald Tunnecliffe – For outstanding public service to the improvement of the institution of parliamentary democracy, particularly in Victoria.

==== Queensland Public Service ====
- Kirstine Illene Harvie – For outstanding public service through the provision of human services in Queensland.
- Rebecca Jane McGarrity – For outstanding public service to social policy development in Queensland.
- Kerry Louise Petersen – For outstanding public service to infrastructure projects and programs in Queensland.
- Mark John Pitt – For outstanding public service to local government in Queensland.

==== South Australia Public Service ====
- Peter Bruce Copley – For outstanding public service to conservation and the environment, and to biodiversity research and policy development, in South Australia.
- Alexandra Mary-Ellen Reid – For outstanding public service to the arts, culture and education, particularly through delivery of significant improvements to TAFE South Australia.
- Lachlan John Sutherland – For outstanding public service to the delivery of water infrastructure projects, and through cooperation with Indigenous communities in South Australia.

==== Western Australia Public Service ====
- Angela Elder – For outstanding public service to native title policy and collaborative partnerships with the Indigenous community of Western Australia.
- Gail McGowan – For outstanding public service to land use planning and industry development in Western Australia.
- John Kenneth Tondut – For outstanding public service to infrastructure project management, and procurement reform, in Western Australia.

=== Australian Police Medal (APM) ===
Australian Police Medal ribbon

==== Australian Federal Police ====
- Commander Amanda L. Kates
- Detective Sergeant Ronald Hubert Melis
- Detective Superintendent Hilda Sirec

==== New South Wales Police Force ====
- Detective Superintendent Jason William Box
- Detective Superintendent Scott Anthony Cook
- Superintendent Christopher John Craner
- Detective Chief Inspector Jason Paul Dickinson
- Detective Superintendent Linda Jane Howlett
- Acting Assistant Commissioner Leanne Michelle Mccusker
- Detective Superintendent Greg Paul Moore
- Chief Superintendent Rodney James Smith

==== Victoria Police ====
- Commander Lauren Elizabeth Callaway
- Superintendent David John Clayton
- Detective Inspector Andrew Stephen Gustke
- Detective Senior Sergeant Craig Robert Gye
- Commander Andrea Leigh Mcalpine
- Inspector Kathryn Ann Rudkins
- Sergeant Maha Sukkar

==== Queensland Police Service ====
- Inspector Anthony David Graham
- Sergeant Glen John Gunthorpe
- Chief Superintendent Benjamin Roland Marcus
- Sergeant Megan Elizabeth Owens
- Inspector Stephen James Pyne
- Senior Sergeant Kate Maree Teasdale
- Senior Sergeant Melanie Ann Wilkins

==== South Australia Police ====
- Senior Constable First Class Michael Paul Klose
- Senior Sergeant First Class Darren Mulders
- Assistant Commissioner Philip Lachlan Newitt

==== Western Australia Police ====
- Senior Sergeant Peter John Healy
- Brevet Sergeant Wendy Constance Kelly
- Superintendent Gregory Wallace Knott
- Sergeant Ian Stewart

==== Tasmania Police ====
- Assistant Commissioner Jonathan Craig Higgins

==== Northern Territory Police ====
- Senior Constable Keith Richards Currie

=== Australian Fire Service Medal (AFSM) ===
AFSM ribbon

==== New South Wales ====
- Larry Bagnell
- Gavin John Bray
- William Richard Eade
- Peter Geoffrey Evans
- Robert John Field
- Walter Reginald Gately
- Philip John Lindsay
- Bronnie Mackintosh
- Stephen David Perry
- Geoffrey John Selwood
- Robert Brian Thatcher
- Velma Elaine Walker
- Kerri Kathleen Wallace

==== Victoria ====
- Martin Stewart Braid
- David Allan Bruce
- Patrick John McCarthy
- Phillip James Murdoch

==== Queensland ====
- Darryl Leslie King

==== South Australia ====
- Shane Francis
- Allan Robert Marshall

==== Western Australia ====
- Gregory George Broomhall
- Frank James Rankin

==== Australian Capital Territory ====
- Rohan Bernard Scott

==== Northern Territory ====
- Wayne John Stubbs
- Jeffrey Whittaker

=== Ambulance Service Medal (ASM) ===
ASM ribbon

==== New South Wales ====
- Peter James Croft
- Maxine Anne Puustinen
- Brett James Tinker

==== Queensland ====
- Teresa Jane Powell
- Brett Lenard Rogers

==== South Australia ====
- Paul David Lemmer

==== Australian Capital Territory ====
- Megan Emmeline Davis

=== Emergency Services Medal (ESM) ===
ESM ribbon

==== New South Wales ====
- Gregory John Cormack
- Glenn Norman Felkin
- David Renwick Leigh

==== Victoria ====
- Michael Patrick D'Elia
- Leanne Christine Klammer

==== Queensland ====
- Louis James Spann
- Scott Lincoln Walsh

==== South Australia ====
- Susan Joyce Robinson

==== Western Australia ====
- Sandra Irene Lymbery
- Phillip John Rance

==== Australian Capital Territory ====
- Andrew John Gradie

==== Northern Territory ====
- Ronald John Green BM

=== Australian Corrections Medal (ACM) ===
ACM ribbon

==== New South Wales Department of Corrective Services ====
- Sheryl Stacey Cordeiro
- Emma Geesing
- Craig Darrell Osland

==== Corrections Victoria ====
- Shaun Edwin Braybrook
- Tracy Anne Jones

==== Queensland Corrective Services ====
- Peter John Henderson
- Daryl Arthur Richter

==== South Australian Department of Correctional Services ====
- Owen Fredrick Brady

== Distinguished and Conspicuous Service ==
=== Distinguished Service Cross (DSC) ===
DSC ribbon

==== Australian Army ====
- Colonel Robert Kent Calhoun – For distinguished command and leadership in warlike operations while deployed as the Commander of Task Group Taji VI in Iraq from December 2017 to June 2018.
- Member P – For distinguished command and leadership in warlike operations as the Commanding Officer of a deployed Task Group during Operation OKRA, from December 2017 to June 2018.

==== Royal Australian Air Force ====
- Member J – For distinguished command and leadership in warlike operations as Commander of a Strike Element on Operation OKRA between April and December 2017.

=== Distinguished Service Medal (DSM) ===
DSM ribbon

==== Australian Army ====
- Member A – For distinguished leadership in warlike operations as a sub-unit commander during Operation OKRA from December 2017 to June 2018.
- Colonel Mark Christopher Ascough CSC – For distinguished leadership in warlike operations as the Commander of the Kabul Garrison Command Advisory Team and Senior Mentor to the Kabul Garrison Commander, whilst deployed on Operation HIGHROAD in Afghanistan from June 2017 to February 2018.
- Lieutenant Colonel Grant Arthur Chambers CSM and Bar – For distinguished leadership in warlike operations as the Commanding Officer of the Training Task Unit as part of Task Group Taji in Iraq from November 2017 to May 2018.

=== Commendation for Distinguished Service ===
Commendation for Distinguished Service ribbon

==== Australian Army ====
- Member A – For distinguished performance of duties in warlike operations as second-in-command of a deployed team during Operation OKRA from December 2017 to June 2018.
- Corporal George Barsoum – For distinguished performance of duties in warlike operations as a Linguist on Task Group Taji IV and VI, Iraq in 2016–2017 and 2017–2018.
- Major Timothy John Hurley – For distinguished performance of duties in warlike operations as a Squadron Commander in Task Group Taji VI supporting the Iraqi Army Non-Commissioned Officer Academy from November 2017 to May 2018.
- Major David Phillips – For distinguished performance of duties in warlike operations as the Plans Fusion Officer for Information Operations within the Information Operations Directorate of Combined Joint Task Force – Operation Inherent Resolve in Kuwait from August 2017 to February 2018.
- Lieutenant Colonel Simon Martin Vella Bonavita – For distinguished performance of duties in warlike operations as the Chief of Future Operations for Train Advise Assist Command - South, Kandahar, Afghanistan while force assigned to Operation HIGHROAD from July 2017 to May 2018.

==== Royal Australian Air Force ====
- Squadron Leader Simon Frederick Longley – For distinguished performance of duties in warlike operations as the Senior Offensive Duty Officer of the 609th Air Operations Centre on Operation OKRA from October 2017 to April 2018.

=== Conspicuous Service Cross (CSC) ===
CSC ribbon

==== Royal Australian Navy ====
- Commander Dugald Wallace Clelland RAN – For outstanding achievement, leadership and tactical employment while in Command of HMAS Warramunga supporting Operation MANITOU, during the period November 2017 to June 2018.
- Commander Jason John Cupples RAN – For outstanding devotion to duty in the Royal Australian Navy Submarine Force.
- Captain James Riley Lybrand RAN – For outstanding achievement as Director Submarine Operations and Commander Task Group 627.0 in the planning and execution of submarine operations from December 2014 to August 2018.
- Commander Viktor Pilicic RAN – For outstanding achievement as Commanding Officer HMAS Coonawarra and Senior Australian Defence Force Officer Larrakeyah Defence Precinct.
- Captain John Stavridis RAN – For outstanding achievement as the Commanding Officer of HMAS Hobart.

==== Australian Army ====
- Colonel Christopher Kenneth Alder – For outstanding devotion to duty as the Commanding Officer Defence Force School of Intelligence, Defence Command Support Training Centre.
- Lieutenant Colonel Nicholas Brown – For outstanding devotion to duty as Staff Officer Grade One Strategic Engagements, Australian Army Research Centre.
- Colonel Jennifer Lillian Cotton – For outstanding achievement as the Director Support within Headquarters Joint Task Force 633 on Operation ACCORDION from March 2017 to March 2018.
- Colonel Kim Barbet Gilfillan – For outstanding achievement as the Commanding Officer of the 5th Aviation Regiment.
- Lieutenant Colonel Kenneth Alex Golder – For outstanding achievement as a Joint Operations Command Counter-Terrorism planner from January 2017 to August 2018.
- Lieutenant Colonel Trent Ashley Groves – For outstanding devotion to duty as Staff Officer Grade Two Postings within the Directorate of Officer Career Management – Army.
- Colonel Andrew Mark Haebich – For outstanding devotion to duty in the establishment of the Joint Experimentation Directorate and Joint Experimentation Framework within Defence.
- Colonel M – For outstanding devotion to duty as the Commanding Officer 2nd Commando Regiment, 2016 to 2017.
- Lieutenant Colonel Thomas Robson McDermott – For outstanding achievement in establishing The Cove – a professional development network and resource for the Australian Profession of Arms.
- Lieutenant Colonel Edward Ronald Stokes – For outstanding achievement as the Staff Officer Grade Two Logistics, Headquarters 1st Brigade.

==== Royal Australian Air Force ====
- Wing Commander Carlos Alfonso Almenara – For outstanding achievement in the development and implementation of the fighter aircrew muscular skeletal injury prevention and treatment program for the Australian Defence Force.
- Group Captain Timothy Charles Churchill – For outstanding achievement in electronic warfare capability development and in the introduction of the EA-18G Growler airborne electronic attack aircraft for the Australian Defence Force.
- Wing Commander Grant James Fifield – For outstanding achievement in the development of the EA-18G Growler airborne electronic attack capability for the Australian Defence Force as Commanding Officer of Number 6 Squadron.
- Wing Commander Warren Andrew Haynes – For outstanding achievement in development of the E-7A Wedgetail integrated security framework and the establishment of the Directorate of Advanced Capabilities – Air Force for the Australian Defence Force.
- Group Captain Nicholas Alexander Hogan – For outstanding achievement in the delivery of operational and humanitarian support for the Australian Defence Force as the Director of Current Military Commitments.
- Group Captain Kaarin Nina Kooij – For outstanding devotion to duty in military recruiting for the Australian Defence Force.

=== Conspicuous Service Medal (CSM) ===
CSM ribbon

==== Royal Australian Navy ====
- Warrant Officer Johansel Avery – For meritorious devotion to duty as the Catering Manager and Logistics Departmental Regulator in HMAS Adelaide.
- Lieutenant Lachlan James Blair RAN – For meritorious devotion to duty as the Operational Intelligence Analyst whilst deployed in the Middle East for Combined Task Force 150 as part of Operation MANITOU from November 2017 to May 2018.
- Petty Officer Lauren Rachel Carruthers – For meritorious achievement in the field of aviation technician training.
- Lieutenant Commander Laurence Earl Choate RAN – For meritorious devotion to duty as the Regional Manager Fleet Support Unit - North East.
- Commander Nicholas Robert Field RAN – For meritorious achievement in the field of Navy Cyber.
- Lieutenant Commander Belinda Ann Finlay RAN – For meritorious devotion to duty as the First Lieutenant, HMAS Albatross.
- Commander Steven James McCracken RAN – For meritorious achievement as Deputy Director Maritime Commitments in Maritime Operations Branch.
- Chief Petty Officer Lyndon Montgomery Quirke – For meritorious achievement as a senior technician and his efforts to prevent further significant damage to Australian Border Force Cutter Roebuck Bay in 2017.
- Lieutenant Commander Sarah Susan Rhys-Jones RAN – For meritorious achievement as a Principal Warfare Officer in HMAS Warramunga during Operation MANITOU Rotation 66 from October 2017 to July 2018.
- Captain Damien Lyle Scully-O'Shea RAN – For meritorious devotion to duty as Executive Officer of HMAS Canberra.
- Chief Petty Officer Anthony John Sherburd – For meritorious devotion to duty in the field of Navy Information Warfare.
- Commander Samuel Robert Woolrych RAN – For meritorious achievement as Deputy Director Maritime Plans in Maritime Operations Branch.

==== Australian Army ====
- Warrant Officer Class Two A – For meritorious achievement in the intelligence field in the Australian Defence Force.
- Warrant Officer Class Two B – For meritorious achievement in employment category management within Special Operations Command from 2011 to 2018.
- Warrant Officer Class One Clifford Geoffrey Bell OAM – For meritorious devotion to duty as the Regimental Sergeant Major of the Australian Contingent and Force Operations Warrant Officer whilst deployed to Multinational Force and Observers in Sinai, Egypt on Operation MAZURKA from February to August 2018.
- Corporal Warwick James Benn – For meritorious achievement as a Battle Management System-Command and Control instructor and technical adviser in the Australian Army.
- Warrant Officer Class Two Alan Edward Bungate – For meritorious devotion to duty as a Career Advisor, Royal Australian Infantry Corps, Directorate of Soldier Career Management - Army, Army Headquarters.
- Warrant Officer Class Two D – For meritorious achievement as the Training Warrant Officer, 6th Close Health Company, 4th Combat Service Support Battalion.
- Major Samantha Alice Duffy – For meritorious devotion to duty as the Legal Officer for the 6th Combat Support Brigade.
- Warrant Officer Class One J – For meritorious achievement as the Artificer Sergeant Major of the 2nd Commando Regiment.
- Warrant Officer Class Two Dean Nathan King – For meritorious devotion to duty as the Warrant Officer Physical Training Instructor of the 1st Recruit Training Battalion, Kapooka.
- Warrant Officer Class Two Adam John Lehane – For meritorious achievement as the Officer in Charge of the 7th Signal Regiment Cadre Cell.
- Warrant Officer Class One Matthew Gibson Miller – For meritorious devotion to duty and innovation for developing networked joint digital systems for the Australian Army.
- Sergeant Gayle Claire Walkom – For meritorious devotion to duty as the Unit Welfare Officer and Batugade Platoon Commander at the 3rd Combat Service Support Battalion.
- Lieutenant Colonel Julian Mark Williams – For meritorious achievement as the Senior Medical Officer of the 2nd Health Support Company.

==== Royal Australian Air Force ====
- Leading Aircraftman Paul Raymond Arele – For meritorious achievement in geospatial air intelligence analysis and product development for the Australian Defence Force.
- Squadron Leader David Michael Burns OAM – For meritorious achievement in KC-30A multi-role tanker transport aircraft maintenance reform for the Australian Defence Force as the Senior Engineering Officer at Number 33 Squadron.
- Corporal Ashley Karl Fischer – For meritorious achievement in information technology development and sustainment for the Australian Defence Force.
- Patrick McMahon – For meritorious achievement as the senior loadmaster on a Blackhawk Helicopter during a rescue at sea on the 30 August 1991.
- Squadron Leader Mathew Peter Michell – For meritorious achievement in air weapons project management for the Australian Defence Force.
- Corporal Anthony Peter Sues – For meritorious achievement in fuel installation operation and development at Royal Australian Air Force Base Darwin for the Australian Defence Force.
- Group Captain David A. C. Titheridge – For meritorious achievement in the introduction of the P-8A Poseidon maritime surveillance aircraft capability for the Australian Defence Force as Commanding Officer of Number 11 Squadron.
