= John E. Scanlon =

Australian attorney (born 1961)

John E. Scanlon AO
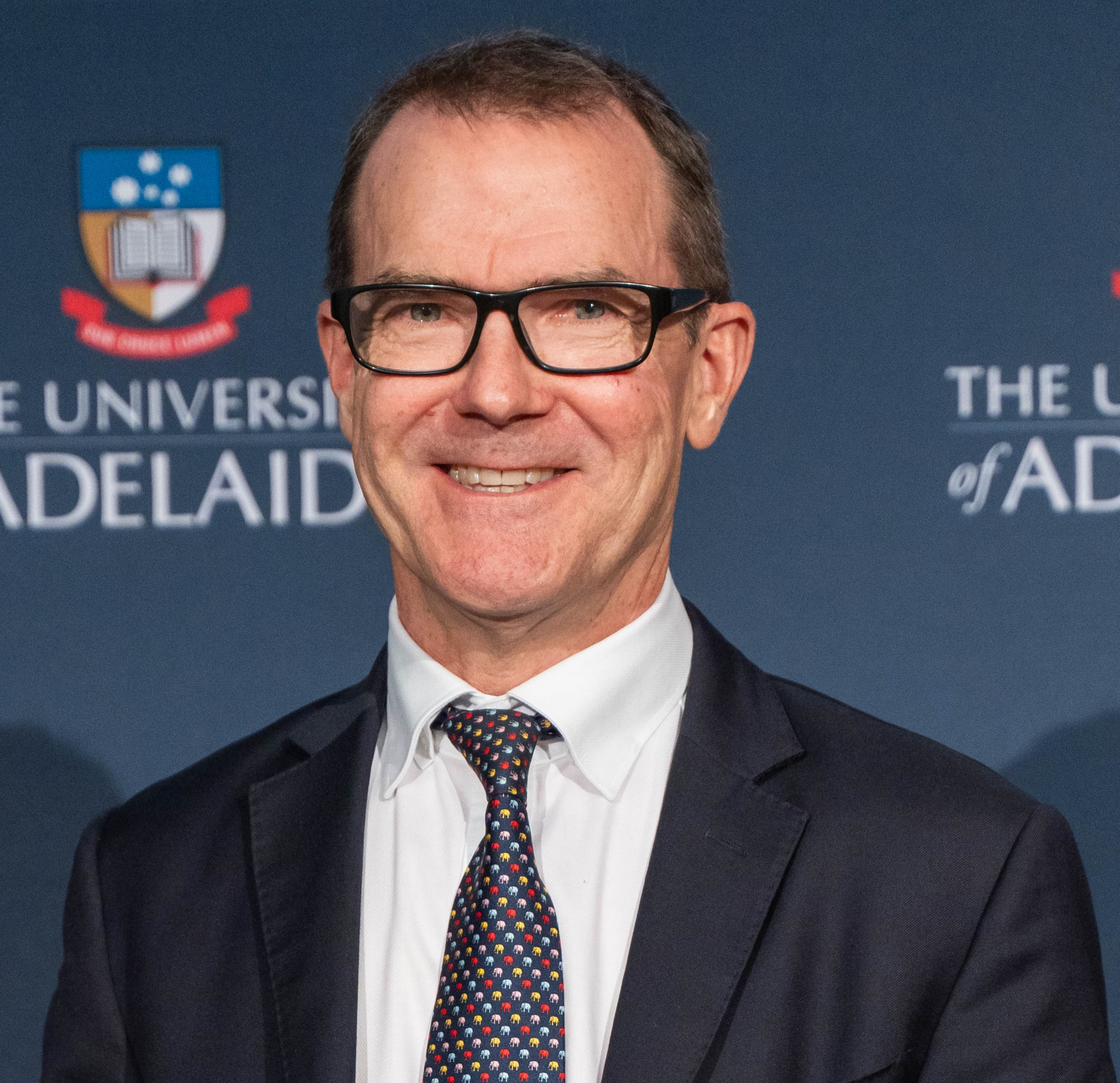
- Education: University of Adelaide
- Occupations: CEO, Elephant Protection Initiative Foundation
- Children: 2

John E. Scanlon AO is an Australian attorney who has held positions with Australian and international environmental organizations, in the fields of environment, development, and elephant conservation.

Scanlon was Secretary-General of the Convention on International Trade in Endangered Species of Wild Fauna and Flora (CITES) from 2010-2018. Before joining CITES he was Principal Adviser on Policy and Programme, and Team Leader of the Strategic Implementation Team, at the UN Environment Programme (UNEP) and Director of the Environmental Law Centre and Head of the Environmental Law Programme with the International Union for Conservation of Nature (IUCN). Prior to that he was Chief Executive of the Department of Environment, Heritage and Aboriginal Affairs in South Australia. He started his career in private legal practice.

== Education ==
Scanlon was born in Australia but also holds British citizenship. He obtained a Bachelor of Laws from the University of Adelaide, a Graduate Diploma in Legal Practice from the South Australian Institute of Technology, and a Master of Laws (in the Environment) from the Australian Centre for Environmental Law (ACEL), University of Adelaide.

== Career before EPI ==
Scanlon started his career in 1984 at the law firm Ward & Partners in Adelaide, Australia, where he was Partner in Charge of Environmental Law. After leaving legal practice he served as Chief of Staff to the South Australian Minister for Environment and Natural Resources and Minister for Family and Community Services.

In 1997 Scanlon was appointed as Chief Executive of the Department of Environment and Natural Resources, and later the Department for Environment, Heritage and Aboriginal Affairs (1997-2000). From 2001 to 2004, he served as Director of the Environmental Law Centre with the International Union for Conservation of Nature (IUCN) and Head of the IUCN Environmental Law Programme. He was a Commissioner for the Murray-Darling Basin Authority from 1997-2000. Scanlon was later appointed as the first Independent Commissioner on the Commission in 2006, and he presented the first ever minority report in the 100-year history of the Commission in the same year.

In 2007 Scanlon accepted an appointment as Principal Adviser on Policy and Programme and Team Leader of the Strategic Implementation Team with the UN Environment Programme (UNEP) in Nairobi, Kenya. In this capacity he led the International Environmental Governance (IEG) reform process and the internal reform process in UNEP, including the development of the first UNEP Medium-term Strategy. In 2010 Scanlon was appointed as the fifth Secretary-General of the CITES Secretariat.

== CITES ==
Scanlon was appointed as Secretary General of the Convention on International Trade in Endangered Species of Wild Fauna and Flora (CITES) by the UN Secretary General Ban Ki-moon in 2010. He was introduced to the CITES Parties and Secretariat at CITES 15th meeting of the Conference of the Parties (CoP15) in Doha in March 2010. He assumed his role with CITES in May 2010 and concluded his mandate in April 2018. He was the first signatory to the International Consortium on Combating Wildlife Crime (ICCWC) in November 2010, which CITES chairs. ICCWC is a collaborative initiative between the CITES Secretariat, INTERPOL, the United Nations Office on Drugs and Crime, the World Bank and the World Customs Organization. ICCWC has progressively gained strong political and financial support and in late 2016 it announced USD20 million in additional funding.

Scanlon testified before the US Senate Foreign Relations Committee on Ivory and Insecurity: The Global Implications of Poaching in Africa in May, 2012. He addressed multiple UN bodies, as well as many other international organisations, in promoting the Convention. He has been recognised for advancing global efforts to combat illegal wildlife trade. Scanlon led the Secretariat during Conferences of the Parties, in Bangkok, Thailand in 2013 (CoP16) and Johannesburg, South Africa in 2016 (CoP17).

== After CITES ==
After serving as Secretary General of CITES for eight years, Scanlon joined African Parks as its first Special Envoy from 2018-2020. Scanlon was appointed CEO of the Elephant Protection Initiative Foundation (EPIF) in 2020, where he leads a secretariat serving 26 African countries committed to conserving their elephants and improving human livelihoods. He has also served as Chair of the Global Initiative to End Wildlife Crime since its launch in June 2020, and was appointed Chair of the UK Challenge Fund on IWT in July 2020. In April 2022 Scanlon was appointed as a Trustee of the Royal Botanic Gardens in Kew. In 2023 he was invited to serve as a Commissioner on the Lancet Commission on Prevention of Viral Spillover. Scanlon was unanimously elected as the new Executive President of the International Council of Environmental Law (ICEL) by its Governing Board and Members Assembly in October 2024. Founded in 1969 by one of the early pioneers of international environmental law, Dr Wolfgang Burhenne, ICEL is the world´s first and oldest organization dedicated to the field of international environmental law. Scanlon frequently writes for Illuminem and was ranked the number one Thought Leader in Nature in 2023 and 2024.

== Honours and awards ==
Scanlon has received a number of honours and awards for his work:

- Member of the Order of Australia (AM) 2011
- International Environmental Law Award (CIEL) 2013
- Baobab Award for Innovation (UNEP) 2015
- Honorary Conservation Fellow (London Zoological Society) 2015
- Doctor Honoris Causa by the Ilia State University, Georgia 2015
- Officer of the Order of Australia (AO), 2019 Queen's Birthday Honours
- Chinese Government Friendship Award, 2023.
- University of Adelaide, Distinguished Alumni Award, December 2023.
- Financial Crime Fighter of the Year Award, Global Coalition to Fight Financial Crime (GCFFC) December 2023
