= Marguerite Evans-Galea =

Molecular biologist and advocate for women in STEMM

Marguerite Evans-Galea AM
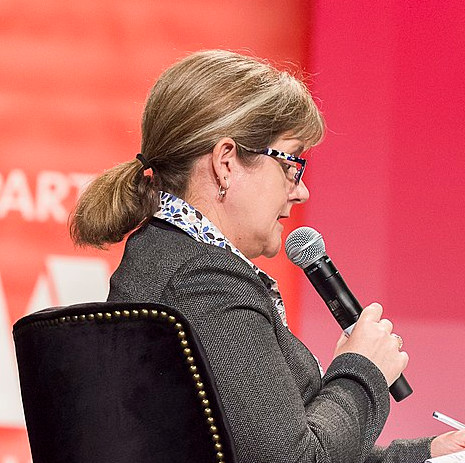
- in 2017
- Born: Mackay, Queensland, Australia
- Education: University of Queensland BSc/BMus, PGDipSc University of NSW PhD
- Known for: Research to develop cell and gene therapies and identify therapeutic targets for Friedreich ataxia
- Medical career
- Profession: Molecular Biologist
- Institutions: Murdoch Children's Research Institute & Department of Paediatrics, The University of Melbourne
- Research: Gene therapy and neurodegenerative diseases.

Marguerite Virginia Evans-Galea AM is the co-founder of Women in STEMM Australia. STEMM (science, technology, engineering, maths and medicine). Her research is focused on gene therapy and neurodegenerative diseases.

== Early life and education ==
Evans-Galea grew up in Mackay, Queensland. She was raised by her mother after her parents separated. In High School she learned clarinet and discovered classical music. After school she planned to be a music therapist, but she was "bitten by the science bug" in her third year of university.

In 1994 she graduated with a double degree from the University of Queensland BSc/BMus. This was followed by a PGDipSc (Postgraduate Diploma in Science) in 1995 also from the University of Queensland and a PhD from the University of New South Wales in 1999. Her doctoral thesis in molecular biology was titled Characterisation of the response to lipid hydroperoxide stress of the yeast Saccharomyces cerevisiae.

== Career ==
From 1999 to 2007 Evans-Galea did postdoctoral research in the USA. In 2000 her postdoctoral fellowship at the University of Utah was terminated when she became pregnant. In 2001 she obtained a post at St Jude Children's Research Hospital in Memphis, Tennessee.

On her return to Australia in 2008 Evans-Galea joined a clinical team at the Bruce Lefroy Centre for Genetic Health Research at the Murdoch Children's Research Institute (MCRI) that allowed her to connect her research on yeasts with medical research. She develops cell and gene therapies for Friedreich's ataxia a neurodegenerative disease which affects children from around 10 years of age.

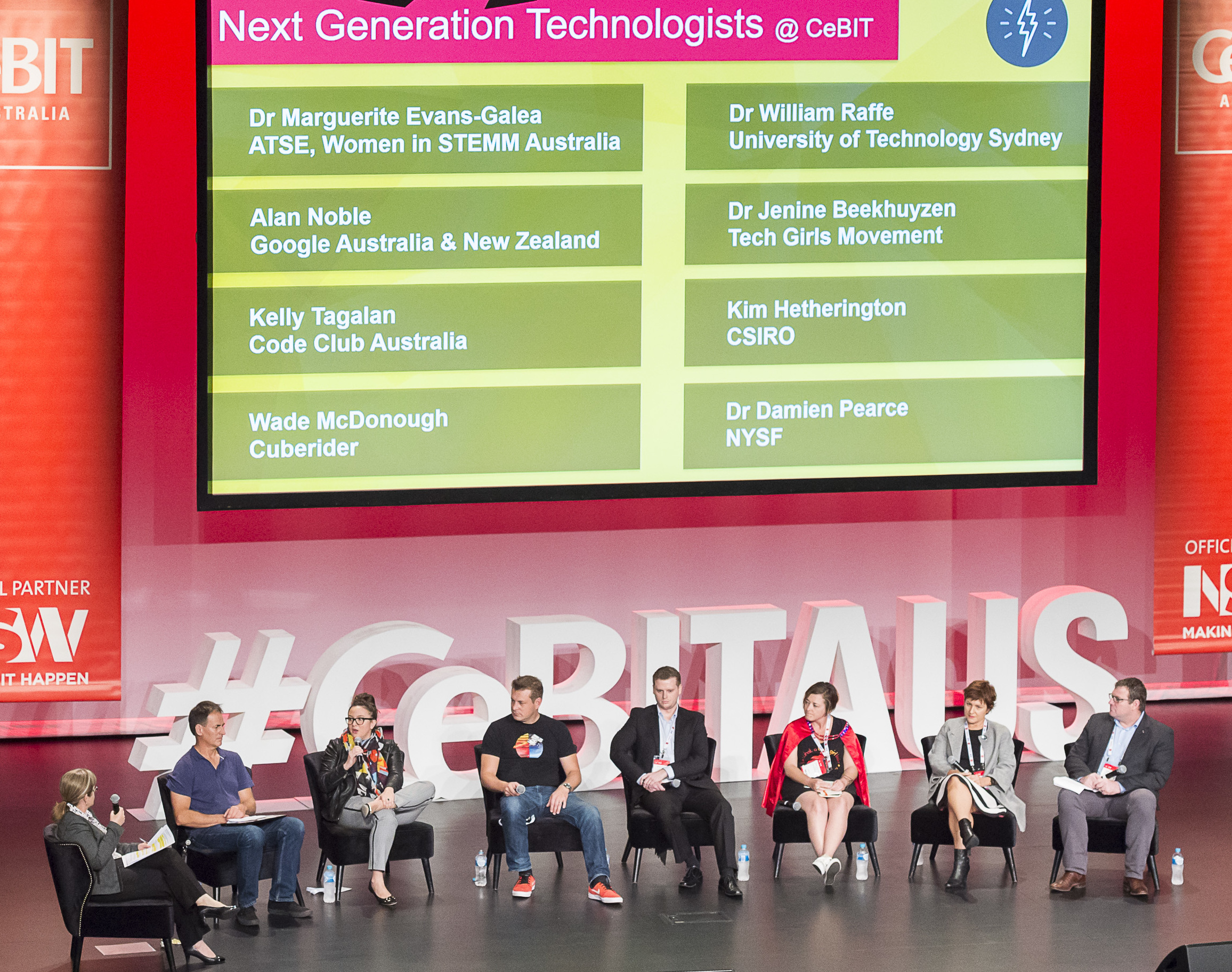
Marguerite Evans-Galea leads "Next Generation Technologies" panel at CeBIT

She was an Honorary research scientist at the Murdoch Children's Research Institute in 2008 and Honorary Fellow, Department of Paediatrics, The University of Melbourne since 2009.

She served on the Immune Responses Committee of the American Society for Gene and Cell Therapy and is a past member of the executive committee of the Australasian Gene and Cell Therapy Society.

She was Chair from 2016 to 2017 of the executive of the Australian Science and Innovation Forum, a partner of the Australian Academy of Technological Sciences and Engineering.

Evans-Galea helps early researchers and she is a leading advocate of gender equality. She developed graduate mentoring programs in the USA. and was the founding chair of the Early-Mid Career Researcher (EMCR) Forum with the Australian Academy of Science from 2011 to 2013. She is a committee member of the Expert Advisory Group of the Science in Australia Gender Equity (SAGE) Forum.

She is Executive Director of the Industry Mentoring Network in STEM (IMNIS) at the Australian Academy of Technology and Engineering. IMNIS connects motivated PhD students in science, technology, engineering and mathematics with high level industry mentors for a one-year industry mentoring program. In October 2018 about 300 PhD mentees were involved in the MTP (medical technologies, biotechnology and pharmaceutical) program in five states and 17 organisations.

Evans-Galea is Program Coordinator for the IMNIS Energy-Minerals Programs and the CCRM Australia-IMNIS International Mentoring Pilot internationally. She is co-founder of Women in STEMM Australia.

Evans-Galea was appointed a Member of the Order of Australia in recognition of her service to women in STEMM.

== Awards and honours ==
2006 — Travel Award, American Society of Gene and Cell Therapy, USA

2009 — New Investigator Award, Friedreich Ataxia Research Alliance, USA

2009 — Panos Ioannou Young Investigator Award, Australasian Gene and Cell Therapy Society

2010 — Leadership Award, Murdoch Children's Research Institute

2012 — Travel Award, Ataxia Investigators Meeting, National Ataxia Foundation USA

2012 — Travel Award, Theo Murphy High Flyers Think Tank, Australian Academy of Science

2013 — Australian Leadership Award

2014 — First Prize, Health Hack for Medical Research

2015 — Travel Award, International Ataxia Research Conference, UK

2017 — an inductee and Ambassador with the Victorian Honour Roll of Women

2019 – Member of the Order of Australia (AM) in the 2019 Queen's Birthday Honours
