= Victorian Medical Women's Society =

Australian association of medical practitioners since 1895

- Abbreviation: VMWS
- Formation: 22 March 1895; 131 years ago
- Founders: Constance Stone; Clara Stone; Lilian Alexander; Helen Sexton; Emily Mary Page Stone; Grace Vale; Margaret Whyte; Elizabeth O'Hara; Annie O'Hara
- Fields: Medicine
- Affiliations: Australian Federation of Medical Women; Medical Women's International Association; Queen Victoria Hospital, Melbourne
- Website: https://vic.afmw.org.au/
- Formerly called: Women's Medical Association

The Victorian Medical Women's Society (VMWS) is the longest-running association of women medical practitioners and medical students. It was established in Melbourne, Australia in 1896 and is one of the oldest active medical organisations in the world. The aim of the society was to set a benchmark in women's health around Victoria, and to advance the professional development of medical women, through education, research, and the improvement of professional opportunities. The state-run society became affiliated with the national body, Australian Federation of Medical Women (since 1927), and thereby the Medical Women's International Association.

== History ==
=== The Context ===
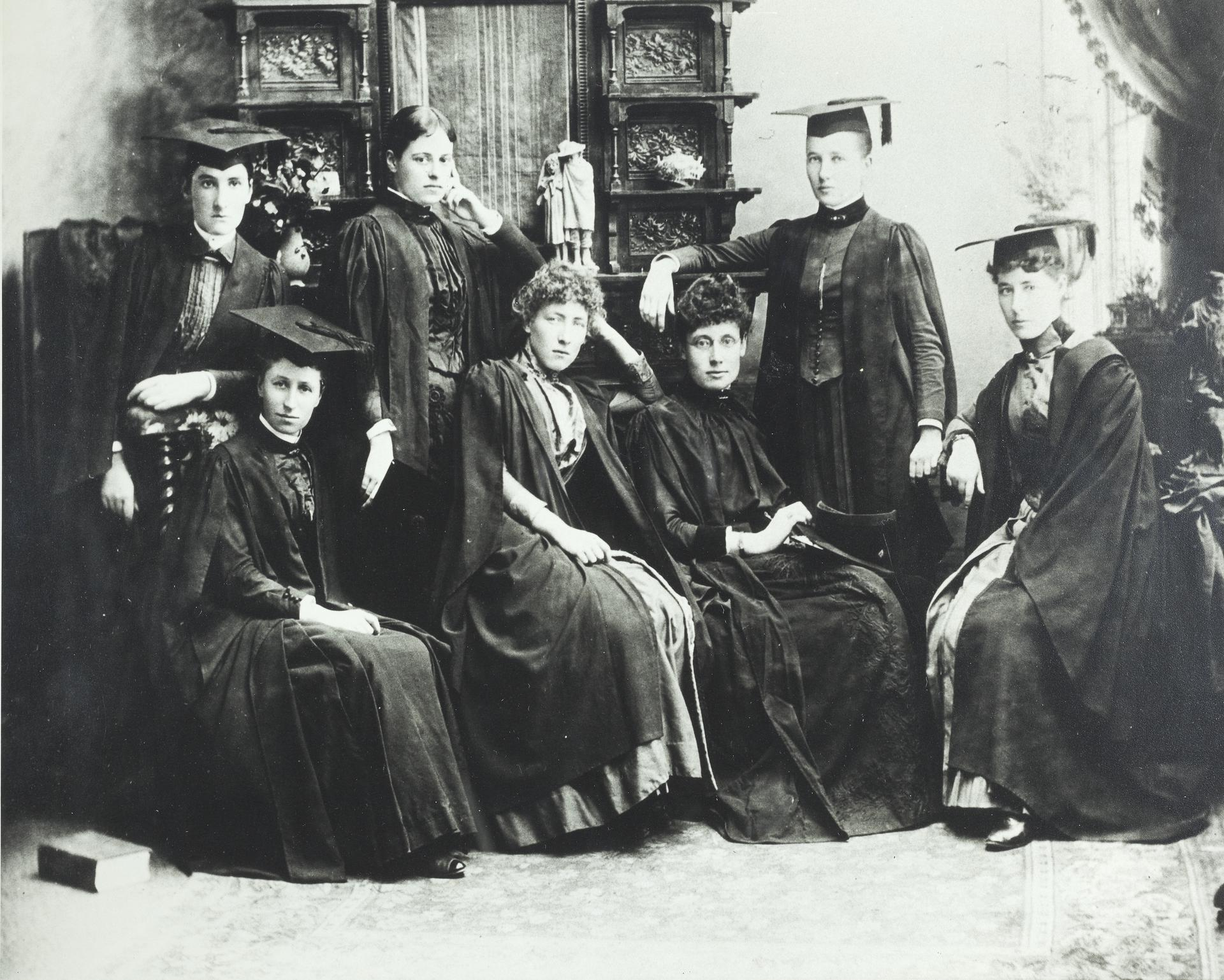
Medical students at the University of Melbourne: Seated (L-R) Clara Stone, Margaret Whyte, Grace Vale, Elizabeth O'Hara. Standing (L-R) Helen Sexton, Lilian Alexander, Annie O'Hara.

In 1862 the Melbourne University Medical School opened, however women were not admitted. Over the next 20 years each of the university's faculties opened to admitting women, except the medicine faculty. After Constance Stone's admission to the faculty was refused in 1883, she travelled to the USA to commence a medical degree. In January 1987, Lilian Alexander, and Helen Sexton put an advertisement in the paper seeking other women who were interested in enrolling in medicine at the university. Five women responded, Clara Stone, who was Constance Stone's sister, Grace Vale, Margaret Whyte, and Elizabeth and Annie O'Hara. They started drawing on their collective resources, gathering support through their connections to the university council, and in the media leading to supportive articles in the paper. Eventually, on 21 February 1887, the university council met, and Dr. Alexander Morrison, moved a motion to approve the admission of women in medicine, and it was seconded by Dr. John Madden. The motion passed ten votes to three. One of the three dissenting votes was cast by the university's Vice-Chancellor Sir Anthony Brownless, who had strongly opposed the inclusion of women at the university for many years. All seven women were enrolled, and along with two other women Amy de Castilla and Emily Mary Page Stone who had enrolled in the following years, all graduated by 1894, and entered into practice.

- Clara Stone graduated in 1891
- Margaret Whyte graduated in 1891
- Helen Sexton graduated in 1892
- Elizabeth O'Hara graduated in 1892
- Lilian Alexander graduated in 1893
- Amy de Castilla graduated in 1893
- Emily Mary Page Stone graduated in 1893
- Grace Vale graduated in 1894
- Annie O'Hara graduated in 1894

Constance Stone returned to Australia in 1890 as a qualified doctor, and began practice, becoming the first woman to do so in Australia. Together these ten women were instrumental in founding what would later become the Victorian Medical Women's Society.

=== Founding the 'Women's Medical Association' ===
The Victorian Medical Women's Society was founded as the Women's Medical Association on 22 March 1895, at the University of Melbourne Medical School, with Dr Constance Stone, serving as its first president. It was founded with the aim to further the professional development of medical women by education, research and improvement of professional opportunities, and fostering relationships between undergraduates, and graduates. Soon after its foundation, its aims evolved to promote and advocate the health and welfare of all Australians, particularly women and children.

=== Queen Victoria Hospital ===
The founders of the Victorian Medical Women's Society established the Queen Victoria Hospital, one of the first hospitals worldwide to be run by women, for women. This clinic was run from the hall of the Melbourne Welsh Church, at 320 La Trobe Street, Melbourne, where Constance Stone's husband Dr/Reverend Egryn Jones presided. Here, the founders of the society volunteered their expertise and treated the poorest of women at no cost. Their services were in high demand with over two thousand patients presenting to the clinic in its first three months of opening. To expand their services the society established the Queen's Shilling Fund, where every woman in the state of Victoria was asked to donate a shilling to fund a new hospital. This campaign, largely arranged by suffragist Annette 'Annie' Bear-Crawford, was very successful and the Queen Victoria Hospital was born at Mint Place a year later. In 1946 it was relocated to a much larger premises at the site of the former Melbourne General Hospital on Lonsdale Street (now The Queen Victoria Village). By 1951 it was the biggest women's hospital in the British Commonwealth. In 1986 the hospital became part of the Monash Medical Centre as part of moves to decentralise hospital services.

=== First World War ===
At the time of the onset of the First World War, many Australian women doctors wanted to support the war effort by providing their much-needed skills in assisting the sick and wounded. However, as women, they were not permitted enlistment in both the Royal Australian Army Medical Corps and the Royal Army Medical Corps. Six members of the Victorian Medical Women's Society sought alternative means to provide their services, through military services established by medical women overseas. These notable women, including Mary de Garis, Helen Sexton, and Vera Scantlebury are honoured with a memorial plaque which was placed at The Welsh Church in 2016.

== Members ==
=== Foundational members included ===
- Emma 'Constance' Stone (1856–1902)
- Grace 'Clara' Stone (1860–1957)
- Mary Page Stone (1865–1910)
- Lilian Helen Alexander (1861–1934)
- Janet 'Jenny' Lindsay Greig (1874–1950)
- Jane 'Jean' Stocks Greig (1872–1939)
- Hannah Mary 'Helen' Sexton (1862–1950)
- Grace Vale (1860–1933)
- Ida 'Gertrude' Halley (1867–1939)

=== Other notable members ===
- Edith Helen Barrett (1872–1939) - General Practitioner, known best for the founding of the Bush Nursing Association of Victoria and her work with The Australian Red Cross and National Council of Women
- Constance Ellis (1872–1942) - Obstetrician and gynaecologist, and first woman to graduate from the University of Melbourne as a Doctor of Medicine
- Mary Clementina De Garis (1881–1963) - Obstetrician
- Vera Scantlebury (1889–1946) - Physician, Surgeon, Anaesthetist, Director of Infant Welfare Vic Gov. Known best for her work in maternal and child welfare
- Dame Kate Isabel Campbell (1899–1986) - Paediatrician, best known for her research in excessive supplemental oxygen causing blindness in premature neonates
- Mary Glowrey (1887–1957) - First Catholic religious sister to practice as a doctor (in obstetrics, gynaecology, and ophthalmology), best known for her medical and social work with women in Guntur, India
- Dame Annie 'Jean' MacNamara (1899–1968) - Paediatrician, best known for her contributions to children's health and welfare, and research on polio
- Jean Littlejohn (1899–1990) - Ear Nose Throat Surgeon
- Lorna Lloyd-Green (1910–2002) - Obstetrician and Gynaecologist, first female fellow of the Australian Medical Association, advocate for equal pay
- Elizabeth Kathleen TurnerAO (1914-1999) was a Paediatrician, who was the medical superintendent of the (Royal) Children's Hospital Melbourne from 1943 until 1946. She was first doctor in Australia to administer penicillin.
- Lorna Verdun Sisely (1916–2004) - General Surgeon
- Dame Joyce Daws (1925–2007) - Thoracic surgeon
- Lena McEwan (1927–2011) - First female plastic surgeon in Australia

== See also ==
- Women in medicine
- Health care in Australia
- Women's suffrage in Australia
- Medical education in Australia
- Royal Australasian College of Surgeons
- Australian Medical Association
