= Annie O'Hara =

Australian medical doctor (1869-1897)

Annie O'Hara MB
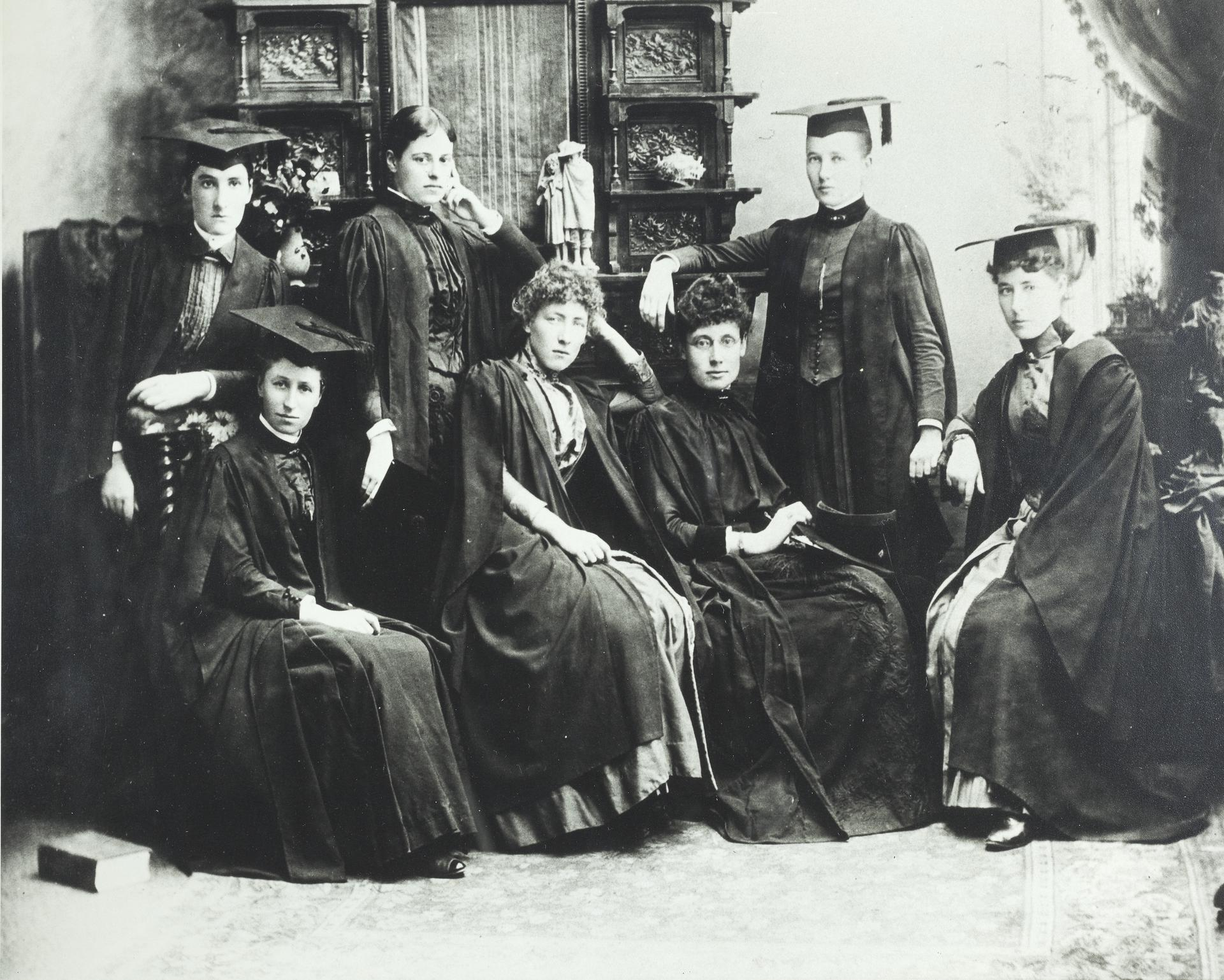
- O'Hara in 1887
- Born: Annie Genevieve O'Hara; 1869; Victoria, British Empire
- Died: 26 April 1897 (aged 27–28); Melbourne, Victoria, British Empire
- Education: Melbourne University
- Medical career
- Profession: Physician
- Field: General Practice

Annie Genevieve O'Hara MB (1869 - 26 April 1897) was a doctor from Melbourne, Victoria who was a founding member of the Victorian Medical Women's Society, and in 1887 she was one of the first seven women who enrolled in medicine at the University of Melbourne. She graduated in 1894 and commenced practice, however, in 1897 she contracted a cold and died at 27 years of age.

== Early life ==
Annie O'Hara was born to Mary Ann (Connolly) O'Hara (1846-1895) and Patrick Kelly O'Hara (1840-1921). Her brother John O'Hara was, like their father, a school master and a poet. O'Hara's sister Elizabeth O'Hara was a medical doctor, having enrolled into the Melbourne University medical faculty at the same time as O'Hara.

== Education ==
In the late 1880s, medical schools in Australia did not accept enrollments from women. O'Hara and her sister Elizabeth wished to become doctors, and passed matriculation at the University of Melbourne, but due to the medicine faculty's ban on women, they began to look into options for study overseas. Their father wrote to the university asking for them to be accepted, as he did not want them to move away. Lilian Alexander and Helen Sexton posted a notice in the newspaper seeking women who wished to enrol in medicine so they could apply as a group. O'Hara and her Elizabeth applied, as did Grace Vale, Clara Stone, and Margaret Whyte. Together they campaigned and successfully convinced the university to accept their enrolments in 1887. All of the students graduated as doctors, with O'Hara gaining her degree in 1894.

== Career ==
On 22 March 1895, O'Hara joined Constance Stone, Emily Stone, Grace Stone, Lilian Alexander, Margaret Whyte, Grace Vale, Helen Sexton, and her sister Elizabeth O'Hara for a meeting which was the foundation of the Victorian Medical Women's Society. O'Hara worked in private practice with her sister in South Melbourne.

== Death ==
O'Hara died on 26 April 1897 at her Beaconsfield parade residence in Albert Park, after having contracted a cold two weeks earlier. She was buried in St Kilda Cemetery.
