= Elizabeth O'Hara (medical doctor) =

Australian medical doctor (1866-1942)

Elizabeth O'Hara MB ChB
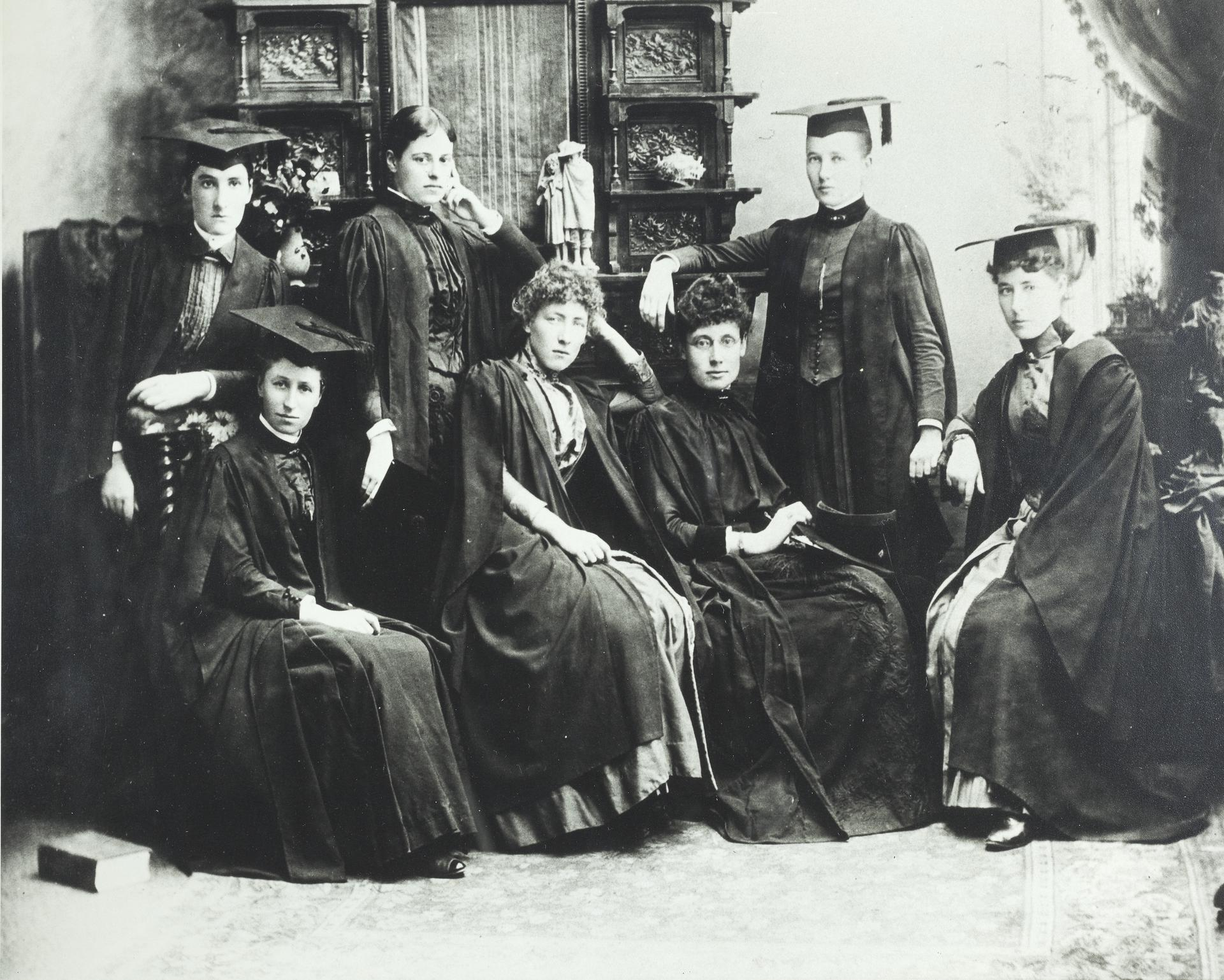
- O'Hara in 1887
- Born: Elizabeth Alice Maude O'Hara; 1866; Melbourne, Victoria, British Empire
- Died: 14 November 1942 (aged 75–76); Melbourne, Victoria, Australia
- Education: University of Melbourne
- Medical career
- Profession: Physician
- Field: General Practice
- Institutions: Australian Natives' Association

Elizabeth Alice Maude O'Hara MB ChB (1866 - 14 November 1942) was a doctor from Melbourne, Australia. She was one of the founding members of the Victorian Medical Women's Society, and was the first woman to take an appointment as a medical officer in the Australian Natives' Association. O'Hara was one of the first seven women to study medicine in Australia, enrolling at the University of Melbourne in 1887, and graduating in 1892.

== Early life ==
O'Hara was born in Victoria to Mary Ann (Connolly) O'Hara (1846-1895) and Patrick Kelly O'Hara (1840-1921). Her sister was fellow medical doctor Annie O'Hara. Her brother, John O'Hara and her father were both teachers, and writers.

== Education ==
O'Hara was privately tutored by her brother John O'Hara in mathematics, Mr Muller in languages, and Mr Clezy in the classics. In her first matriculation exam, O'Hara achieved honours in Latin, Greek, French, German, algebra, geometry, and trigonometry, an accomplishment no other student had achieve at the time.

O'Hara wished to study medicine, however at that time, no medical schools in Australia, including the University of Melbourne Faculty of Medicine allowed women to enrol. O'Hara began organising a move to Edinburgh to study. O'Hara's father supported her and her sister Annie's wishes to study medicine, and not wanting them to move away he wrote to the University of Melbourne requesting their admission. The sisters responded to a newspaper notice written by Lilian Alexander, and Helen Sexton who were seeking other women wishing to enrol, so they could organise and enrol as a group. Grace Vale, Clara Stone, and Margaret Whyte also responded to the letter, and together these seven women began a campaign to force the University to accept their enrollments. They lobbied the university council, and used their media connections to push the University to lift the ban on women enrolling. On 21 February 1887, the university council met and approved a motion to allow women into medicine, ten votes to three. All seven women were enrolled, and graduated by 1894. After an Illness prevented her from completing the degree in 1891, O'Hara gained her Bachelor of Medicine degree on 23 December 1892.

== Career ==
O'Hara was a founding member of the Victorian Medical Women's Society, joining Constance Stone, Emily Mary Page Stone, Grace Clara Stone, Lilian Alexander, Margaret Whyte, Annie O'Hara, Grace Vale and Helen Sexton for the first meeting on 22 March 1895.

In 1898, O'Hara became a medical officer of the Port Melbourne Branch of the Australian Natives' Association. She was the first woman to hold such an appointment. While holding this position, she continued to take private appointments at her residence at 100 Beaconsfield Parade in Albert Park, holding appointments in the mornings and evenings. She was a point of call to respond to public medical emergencies in the area such as heart attacks and drownings. O'Hara also practiced medicine in Northcote and Middle Park.

== Death ==
O'Hara died on 14 November 1942 at 75 years of age at her Beaconsfield parade residence in Albert Park. She was buried in Coburg Cemetery.
