= Joyce Daws =

British Australian surgeon (1925–2007)

Dame Joyce Daws DBE FRCS FRACS
- Born: Joyce Margaretta Daws; 21 July 1925; England
- Died: 13 June 2007 (aged 81); Victoria, Australia
- Education: St Paul's Girls' School; Cambridge University; Royal Free Hospital School of Medicine
- Medical career
- Profession: Medical Doctor
- Institutions: Royal Free Hospital School of Medicine; Queen Victoria Hospital, Melbourne
- Sub-specialties: Thoracic surgery

Dame Joyce Margaretta Daws (21 July 1925 – 13 June 2007) was an Australian-based British doctor who specialised in thoracic surgery at various hospitals for over twenty years, primarily in Melbourne. She held the post of Consultant Surgeon of Melbourne.

== Early life ==
The Hounslow-born Daws, having been educated at Royal School for Naval and Marine Officers' Daughters, St Paul's Girls' School, received a scholarship to study classics at Cambridge University.

== Career ==
During the second world war, Daws enrolled to study at the Royal Free Hospital School of Medicine, receiving her MBBS in 1949. In 1952, she was awarded a post-graduate scholarship to study surgery, and she passed the exams to be a fellow of the Royal College of Surgeons. Daws worked at the Royal Free Hospital School of Medicine in the UK until Lorna Verdun Sisely visited the hospital on her trip to gain surgical knowledge of the latest techniques and technology, and to recruited Daws to work at the Queen Victoria Medical Centre. In 1956 Daws moved to Melbourne Australia to work with Sisely.

- Member, Victorian Nursing Council (1974-2007)
- President of the Cancer Institute of Victoria (and board member; 1978–80)
- Chairman, Victorian Nursing Council (1983–89)
- Chairman, International Protea Association (1987–96)
- Member, Victorian Medical Women's Society

== Death ==
Dame Joyce Daws died in Victoria on 13 June 2007, aged 81, from undisclosed causes and left $10,000 to the Nurses Board of Victoria (NBV).

== Honours ==
She was appointed Dame Commander of the Order of the British Empire on 14 June 1975 "for her services to medicine".

== Legacy ==
- Dame Joyce Daws Churchill Fellowship Grant
