= Elizabeth O'Hara =

Elizabeth O'Hara may refer to:

- Éilís Ní Dhuibhne (born 1954), Irish novelist and short story writer
- Elizabeth O'Hara (medical doctor) (1866–1942), one of Australia's first medical graduates
