= South Melbourne College =

Location
- South Melbourne, Victoria; Australia
- Coordinates: 37°50′41″S 144°57′21″E

Information
- Type: private
- Established: 1889
- Founder: Thomas Palmer
- Status: closed
- Closed: 1917

South Melbourne College was a co-education boarding school in South Melbourne, Victoria, Australia. The school was founded by Thomas Palmer in 1883.

John Bernard O'Hara became a partner in 1889 and became sole proprietor in 1893–94. In his hands it became a leading private school in Victoria. During a period of eight years, of 28 first-class honours gained by all the schools of Victoria in physics and chemistry, 14 were obtained by pupils from South Melbourne College. O'Hara was an inspiring teacher, and many of his pupils went on to hold distinguished positions in the universities of Australia.

From 1905, the school was located at 76 Kerferd Rd, South Melbourne.

O'Hara closed the school in 1917 due to ill health.

The Fred Walker Company acquired the premises in 1920, housing the food manufacturing business which later produced Vegemite.

== Notable alumni ==
- Edith Helen Barrett, medical doctor
- Don Cameron, politician
- Isabella Jobson, nurse who served in World War I
- Paul Jones, politician
- Katharine Susannah Prichard, author
- Henry Caselli Richards, geologist
- T. J. Ryan, politician
- Walter Nairn, politician
- Doctor Sister Mary Glowrey JMJ, medical missionary in India
- Doctor Elsie Carne (nee Thomas), medical missionary in India and Fiji
- Victor Charles Nightingall, Inventor, foundation member of the Victorian Institute of Electrical Engineers. Inventor and original patent holder of Inorganic zinc coatings which revolutionised the protection of steel from corrosion. Was described in his obituary in the Melbourne "Sun" newspaper (4 Aug 1947) as Australia's Edison.
