= Amy Castilla =

Australian physician (1868–1898)

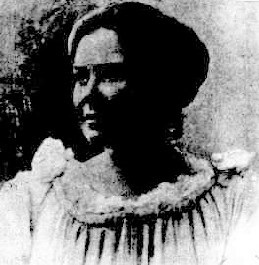
Dr. Amy Castilla

Marie Elizabeth Amy Castilla (26 September 1868 – 9 November 1898), known as Amy Castilla, was an Australian medical doctor and journalist. With a group of other women doctors, she was one of the founding members of the Queen Victoria Hospital, Melbourne.

== Early life and education ==
Born in Melbourne, Castilla was the daughter of May or Mary (née Robertson) and Frederic Ramos de Castilla, a Spanish-born merchant. Her sister, Ethel Castilla, was a poet and correspondent for The Sydney Mail, the Daily Telegraph, and The Herald and Weekly Times.

After she completed her matriculation examination at Methodist Ladies’ College in January 1886, she qualified for entry to Melbourne University but her family couldn’t afford the fees for a medical degree, so instead she did a shorter nursing certificate course, training at the Alfred Hospital while she saved money for her degree course.

At a time when opposition to female doctors was still strong, Castilla was one of a group of seven young women who qualified for financial help from a wealthy private benefactor known only as “Louise”, who stated she wanted to help female medical students at Melbourne University who hadn’t had the “advantage of a free state education” and by October 1889 she had completed the first year of medicine. Castilla was one of three female medical students from the university who worked at the Alfred Hospital for three years to gain practical experience as part of their course. However, in October 1891 they wrote to the hospital committee of management, expressing regret that they had to leave because it could not offer the surgical training required in their fourth year. She graduated with a Bachelor of Medicine degree two years later, in November 1893, after spending a year in the midwifery section of the Women’s Hospital and another year in its infirmary.

== Career ==
In April 1894, within months of her graduation, Castilla became the first woman to be resident medical doctor in a general hospital in any of the Australian colonies. The appointment was to St. Vincent’s Hospital, recently opened in the inner suburb of Fitzroy by the Catholic order of nuns, the Sisters of Charity. Castilla did not stay long at St. Vincent’s, taking up new appointments as assistant medical officer and then resident surgeon at the Women’s Hospital in 1894-5.

Early in 1896, she went into private practice in partnership with her close friend and fellow graduate from Melbourne University, Helen Sexton. Later that year, they would be among the founders of the future Queen Victoria Hospital for Women, to be staffed entirely by women. While funds were being raised for a permanent building for the new women’s hospital, Castilla and Sexton worked together one day a week, voluntarily treating out-patients at a temporary hospital established at St. David’s Hall in Latrobe Street. Along with Sexton and other pioneer women doctors including Clara Stone and Lilian Alexander, Castilla was later elected a member of the hospital’s honorary medical staff.

In private practice, Castilla developed a large number of patients among women and children. As well as looking after everyday needs, among her patients and through public lectures, Castilla promoted the belief that girls and women should do more exercise because it enhanced growth, “functional vigor”, and “physical courage”. She set an example by cycling long distances between appointments. “Dr. Amy Castilla…visits her patients on a bicycle and is never seen awheel unless with a professional looking bag, which is supposed to contain lancets, bandages, and the dreadful paraphernalia of a surgeon,” one newspaper reported. “Dr. Castilla’s cyclo-meter must register many score of miles a week, as she is seen out in all weathers.”

== Death and legacy ==
Despite being “tended day and night” by Helen Sexton for several weeks, Amy Castilla died on 9 November, 1898, in East Melbourne from pleurisy and pneumonia, aged 30. According to one newspaper report of her death, she had been considered “one of the cleverest Melbourne doctors of her sex”.

She was inducted into the Victorian Honour Roll of Women in 2007.
