= Clara Stone =

Australian physician (1860–1957)

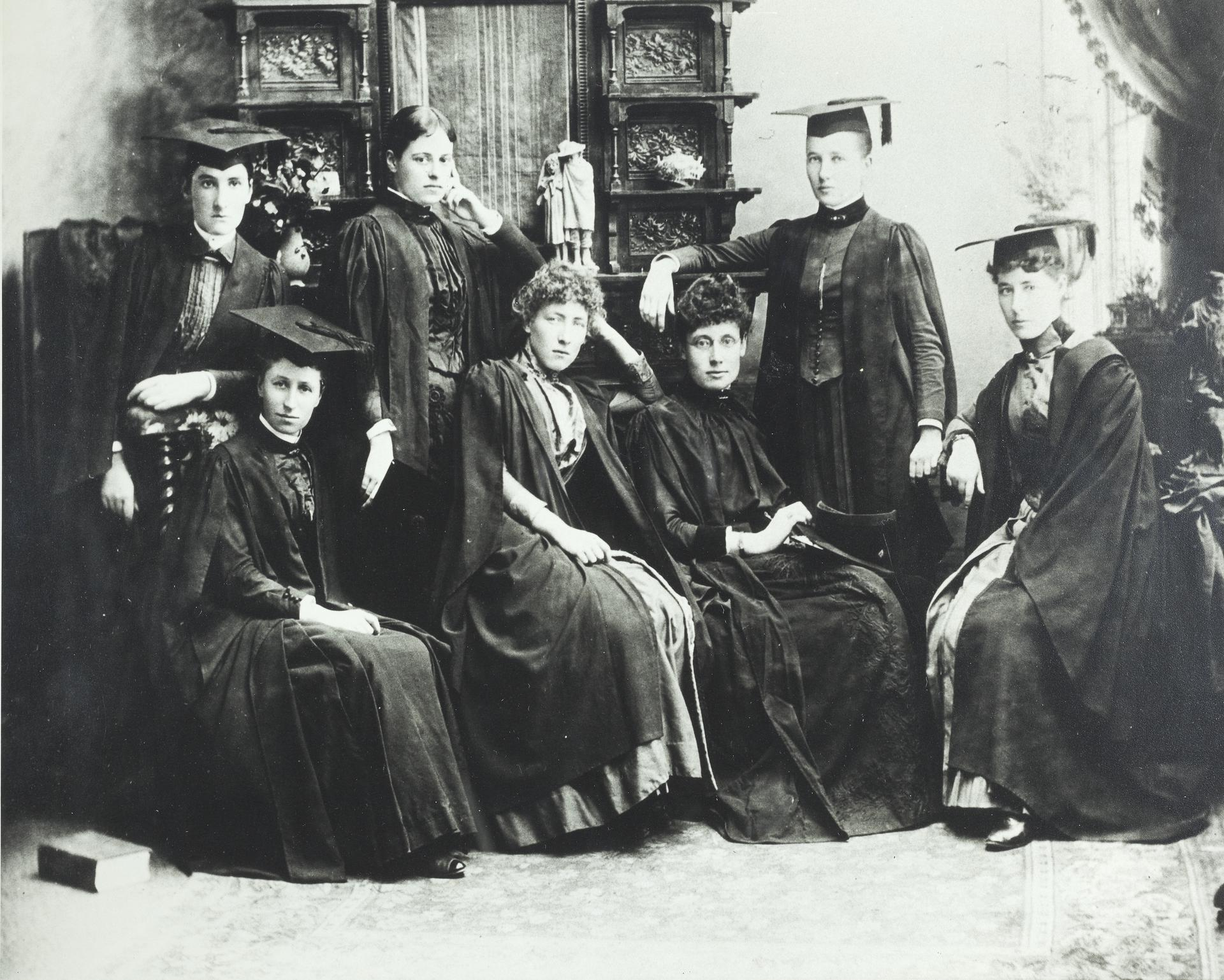
- Clara Stone, 1887
- Born: Hobart, Tasmania
- Education: University of Melbourne
- Occupation: General practitioner

Grace "Clara" Stone (12 January 1860 – 10 May 1957) was a medical doctor from Melbourne, Australia, who was one of the founders of the Queen Victoria Hospital and a co-founder, and the first president, of the Victorian Medical Women's Society. She was also in the group of seven women who successfully fought the ban against women studying medicine at Melbourne University in 1887, and one of the first two women to graduate as a doctor, in 1891.

== Career ==
=== Studying Medicine ===
In 1887, the University of Melbourne allowed women to study in all faculties other than medicine. Earlier, in 1883, Stone's sister Constance had her admission to the faculty of medicine refused, she travelled overseas to obtain her medical degree Stone subsequently also applied to Melbourne University and was refused, until she responded to an advertisement that Lilian Alexander, and Helen Sexton put in the paper seeking other women who were interested in enrolling in medicine at the university. Five women including Stone responded, Grace Vale, Margaret Whyte, and Elizabeth and Annie O'Hara. Together they actively agitated through their connections on the university council, and through the media to force the university to allow them to enrol in Medicine. On the 21 February 1887, the university council met and approved a motion to allow women into medicine, ten votes to three. All seven women were enrolled, and graduated, with Stone being one of the first, graduating with Whyte in 1891.

Her sister, Constance Stone, was the first woman to practice medicine in Australia.

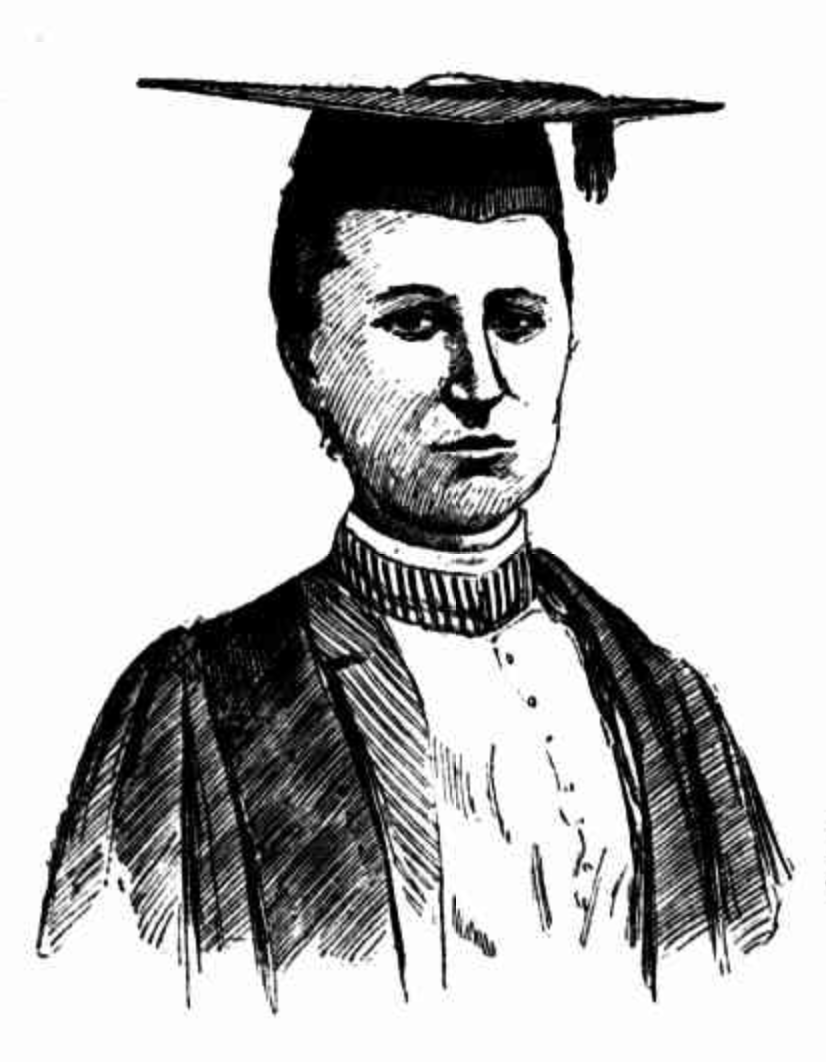
On her graduation from the University of Melbourne, 1891

== Awards ==
Stone was inducted onto the Victorian Honour Roll of Women in 2007.
