= Margaret Whyte (medical doctor) =

Australian medical doctor (1868-1946)

Margaret Whyte MB BS
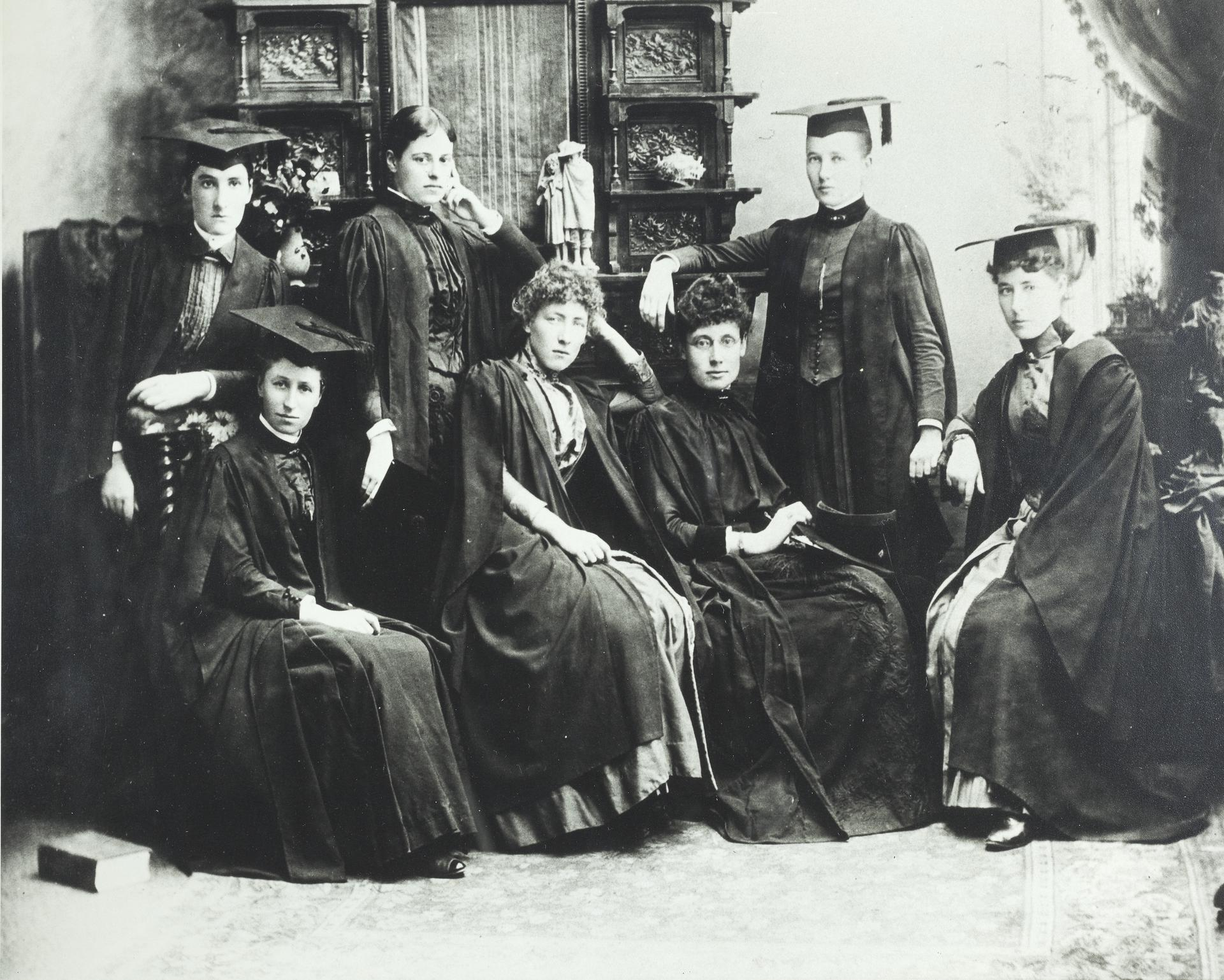
- Margaret Whyte, 1887
- Born: 1868; Victoria, Australia
- Died: 25 April 1946 (aged 77–78)
- Other name: Margaret Martell
- Education: Presbyterian Ladies' College, Melbourne; Melbourne University
- Occupation: Physician
- Years active: 1887–1902
- Medical career
- Profession: Physician
- Institutions: Royal Women's Hospital; Queen Victoria Hospital, Melbourne

Margaret Whyte MB BS (1868 – 25 April 1946) was a medical doctor from Melbourne, Australia. She graduated as a doctor with the top grades in her class of 1891, and along with her classmate Clara Stone, this made them the first women to graduate as doctors in Victoria. While she qualified for a residency at the Royal Melbourne Hospital, she was denied her place because of her gender, and so took an appointment in 1892 at the Royal Women's Hospital instead. She was the first woman resident at the hospital.

== Early life ==
Margaret Whyte was born in Victoria in 1868 to Patrick Whyte, a headmaster of the Model School in Carlton.

== Studying medicine ==
In 1887, women were not permitted to study medicine in any university in Australia, including at the University of Melbourne. Whyte had been refused entrance to medicine when she responded to a newspaper advertisement posted by Lilian Alexander, and Helen Sexton seeking fellow women interested in studying medicine at the university. Whyte was one of five women who responded, the others being Grace Vale, Clara Stone, and Elizabeth and Annie O'Hara.

Together they actively agitated through their connections on the University council, and through the media to force the University to allow them to enrol in Medicine. On 21 February 1887, the university council met and approved a motion to allow women into medicine, ten votes to three. All seven women were enrolled, and graduated, with Stone being one of the first, graduating with Whyte in 1891.

During her studies, Whyte earned the praise of Thomas Naghten Fitzgerald for her skills in dissection and surgical work.

In 1892, Whyte was elected as the assistant resident at the Royal Women's Hospital.

== Later life ==
Whyte met Horatio Percy Martell, (1862–1932) a fellow doctor at the Royal Women's Hospital, they were engaged in 1892, and married on 16 April 1895.

In April of 1902, Whyte, then known as Dr. Martell, was appointed as the senior resident surgeon in the Midwifery department of the Royal Women's Hospital. The hospital had been having issues with pressures on staff, and when she was hired she was required to work alone. The hospital were in the process of recruiting an assistant for her, but anticipated difficulty filling the role due to her gender. Whyte resigned in June of the same year.

Whyte died on 25 April 1946.
