= Eliza Fraser Morrison =

Lady Eliza Fraser Morrison
- Born: Eliza Fraser Morrison; 30 March 1864; Melbourne, Victoria, Australia
- Died: 1 October 1948 (aged 84); Brighton, Victoria, Australia
- Occupation(s): Autobiographer, charity worker, Red Cross administrator
- Spouse: Edward Fancourt Mitchell
- Children: 4 daughters
- Parents: Alexander Morrison (father); Christina, née Fraser (mother)

Eliza Fraser Morrison, Lady Mitchell (30 March 1864 – 1 October 1948) was a Melbourne based charity worker, Red Cross administrator, and an autobiographer. Morrison was well known for her voluntary work in Australia.

Eliza Fraser Morrison was born on 30 March 1864 in Melbourne, Victoria, Australia to Alexander Morrison and Christina, née Fraser. She was educated at home and later at Presbyterian Ladies' College, Melbourne. Morrison was involved with the Red Cross Society in Victoria, the Victoria League, Queen Victoria Hospital, Melbourne, the New Settlers’ League of Victoria, the Country Women’s Association, and the Victorian Bush Nursing Association.

== Works ==
- Three-quarters of a century, 1940
