= Una Porter =

Australian psychiatrist and philanthropist (1900-1996)

Una Porter CBE
- Born: Una Beatrice Cato; 17 October 1900; Hawthorne, Victoria, Australia
- Died: 24 June 1996 (aged 95); East Melbourne, Victoria, Australia
- Occupations: clinical psychiatrist, philanthropist, author

Una Porter CBE (17 October 1900 - 24 June 1996) was an Australian psychiatrist and philanthropist. As senior psychiatrist at Queen Victoria Hospital, she established their first clinic of psychiatry. She was active in the Australian Young Women's Christian Association (YWCA), and served as world president from 1963 to 1967. She was appointed an officer in the Order of the British Empire on 31 December 1960, and elevated to CBE on 1 January 1968.

== Biography ==
=== Early life and education ===
Porter was born Una Beatrice Cato on 17 October 1900, in Hawthorne, a suburb of Melbourne, Victoria, Australia. Her parents were Frederick John Cato and Frances "Fanny" Gertrude Cato, née Bethune. Una was the youngest of eight children. Her father was a successful merchant who ran the successful grocery chain Moran & Cato with his cousin Thomas Moran. He was also a devoted Methodist, and a lay leader within the church. A generous philanthropist, he contributed to many Methodist charitable activities.

Despite being raised in an affluent family, Porter's childhood was marred by tragedy. When she was four years old, she and her sister Edith, age six, were playing by a pond on their family's property, when Lois fell in the water and drowned. Her sister's death, and the death of another of her siblings at a young age, deeply affected her. She began her early schooling in New Zealand, and later she attended the Methodist Ladies' College in Hawthorne. She travelled to England with her parents for a year in 1914, before returning to Australia. Her health was precarious, and her studies were frequently interrupted. She completed her studies at the Methodist Ladies' College in 1917.

From 1933 to 1935, she began studying medicine at the University of Melbourne, but found that there was considerable resistance to women students. She dropped her studies in 1935, when her father died. From 1937 to 1938, she pursued studies in social work. She later returned to the University of Melbourne to complete her medical degree, graduating with a Bachelor of Medicine, Bachelor of Surgery (MBBS) degree in February of 1944.

=== Medical career ===
After completing her degrees, Porter spent a year working as a resident at Prince Henry's Hospital. She then had placements at the Royal Children's Hospital, and at the Royal Park Mental Hospital. In 1945, she became the first woman on staff at the Ballarat Mental Hospital, where she worked for a brief time, until her marriage to James R. Porter. The couple was married on 12 April 1946. In 1949, Porter began working at the Queen Victoria Hospital, where she was the senior psychiatrist. She held this position for eleven years, during which time she established the first psychiatric clinic at the hospital. She continued as a consultant after her retirement.

=== Philanthropy and Service ===
Having begun participating in the local YWCA when she was eighteen years old, Porter became a member of the Australian YWCA executive in 1925, and served as vice-president of the World YWCA from 1955 to 1959. In 1963, Porter became the first Australian woman to be president of the World YWCA. She served a four year term. She also served as the president of the Australian YWCA from 1971 to 1973.

As a young woman, Porter assisted her father with the administration of his charitable trust, the F. J. Cato Charitable Trust, through which Cato donated to Methodist and other charitable causes. Upon her father's death in 1935, Porter became trustee. Later in life, she made significant charitable donations through her own charitable trust, named the James and Una Porter Trust Fund. She funded a chair of psychiatry at the University of Melbourne, with her mother, in 1964.

She also succeeded her father as a member of the council for the Queen's College in Melbourne, becoming the first woman to sit on the council. She continued in this role until 1964. She also served on the council of St. Hilda's College in Melbourne, from 1961 to 1975.

=== Death and legacy ===
Porter died on 24 June 1996. A collection of her papers are held at the University of Melbourne Archives.

== Honours ==
Porter was appointed an Officer of the Order of the British Empire on 31 December 1960, as part of the New Year Honours. She was recognized for her work on "social welfare". She was then elevated to a Commander of the Order of the British Empire eight years later, as part of the 1968 New Year Honours.

The YWCA named a building in her honour in 1971. She was also included on the Heritage 200 list of notable Australians.

== Works ==
- Una B. Porter, ed. Growing Together: Letters between Frederick John Cato and Frances Bethune, 1881 to 1884 . (1981)
- Una Porter. Bless the Lord, O My Soul. (1975)
