= Kate Mackay =

Australian physician and public servant

Kate Mackay OBE
- Born: 29 April 1897; Bendigo, Victoria, Australia
- Died: 1 September 1983 (aged 86); East Melbourne, Victoria, Australia
- Education: Presbyterian Ladies' College, Melbourne; University of Melbourne
- Occupations: physician; public servant

Kate Mackay OBE (29 April 1897 – 1 September 1983) was an Australian physician and public servant. She was the first female medical inspector in the Victorian Department of Labour and was later a consultant physician to the Queen Victoria Hospital, Melbourne.

== Life and career ==
Mackay was born in 1897 in Bendigo, Victoria. Following an education at Presbyterian Ladies' College, Melbourne, she attended the University of Melbourne, earning her M.B.B.S. in 1922 and M.D. in 1924. She was a resident medical officer at the Royal Melbourne Hospital, the Royal Women's Hospital, and the Royal Children's Hospital. She joined the Victorian Department of Labour in 1925 as the first female medical inspector of factories and shops. She was particularly interested in the wellbeing of women in the workplace, and she visited the United States as part of an industrial delegation in 1927 to observe women's working conditions. She later led an inquiry into women's work in Victoria, and shared her findings via radio talks and lectures. She resigned from the Department of Labour in 1933.

Mackay was a consultant physician to the Queen Victoria Hospital from 1927 to 1957 and to the Royal Women's Hospital from 1945 to 1973. After serving as the physician-in-charge at the Royal Melbourne Hospital diabetes clinic from 1940 to 1945, she founded a diabetes clinic at the Queen Victoria Hospital in 1946 and served as its physician-in-charge until 1953. She was a foundation fellow of the Royal Australasian College of Physicians in 1938 and was appointed Officer of the Order of the British Empire in 1977.

She died on 1 September 1983 in East Melbourne.
