= Mary Page Stone =

Australian medical doctor (1865–1910)

Mary Page Stone MBBS
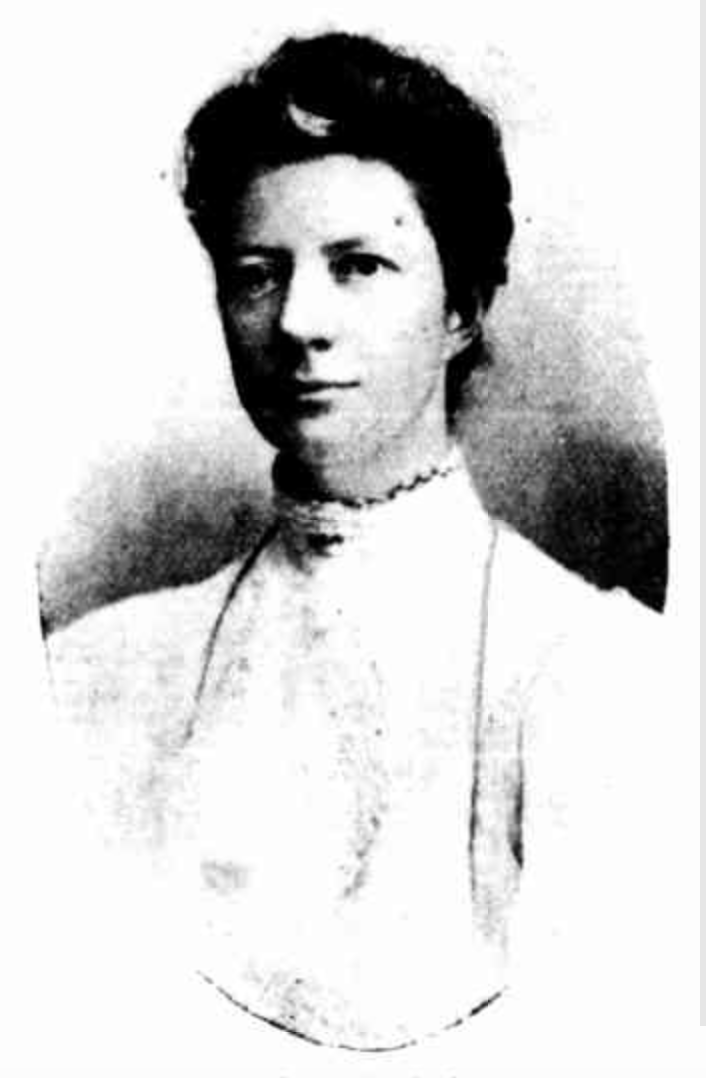
- Dr Mary Stone, 1907
- Born: 31 May 1865; Mornington, Victoria
- Died: 18 December 1910 (aged 45); Hawthorn, Victoria
- Occupation: medical doctor
- Known for: co-founding the Queen Victoria Hospital, Melbourne
- Relatives: Cousins, Constance Stone and Clara Stone

Emily Mary Page Stone MBBS (31 May 1865 – 18 December 1910), generally referred to as Mary or E. Mary Page Stone (sometimes hyphenated), was a medical doctor in the State of Victoria, Australia.

Mary was born in Mornington, Victoria. She was the daughter of a shopkeeper – John Stone, and his wife – Laura Matilda, née Reed. She received her education there and later in England, trained as a teacher. She returned to Melbourne, where she taught at various private schools before enlisting with Melbourne University as a medical student in 1889.

She graduated after a brilliant scholastic career, being second in the top five for her graduating year. This should have entitled her to a position as resident medical officer at the Royal Melbourne Hospital, but was controversially disqualified because of her gender.

Stone was one of the founders of the Victorian Medical Women's Society and one of the founders of the Queen Victoria Hospital, Melbourne.

She practised for sixteen years – first at Windsor then Hawthorn, before her death which took place due to a fall from her bicycle post colliding with a dray.

She was active in the cause of temperance, and an hon. secretary of the Victorian branch of the National Council of Women.

Her cousins – Constance Stone and Clara Stone, were also medical doctors.

== Recognition ==
An operating theatre at Queen Victoria Hospital, Melbourne, designed by I. G. Beaver, was dedicated to her memory by the National Council of Women.

For being a cofounder of the Queen Victoria Hospital, Melbourne, Stone was inducted onto the Victorian Honour Roll of Women in 2007.
