= Doris Lyne Officer =

English-Australian physician and paediatrician (1898-1967)

Doris Lyne Officer OBE (28 June 1898 – 31 July 1967) was an English-Australian physician and paediatrician.

== Biography ==
Doris Veale was born in 1898 in Sidcup, Kent, to an English father and an Australian mother. She attended Cheltenham Ladies' College and went on to study at the London School of Medicine for Women, graduating as MBBS in 1921. She visited Australia in 1922 and 1923 and married Ernest Officer, a grazier from Wanganella, New South Wales.

Doris and Ernest Officer moved to Melbourne in 1927 and she resumed her medical career in 1930. She was an assistant in paediatrics at the Queen Victoria Memorial Hospital from 1932 until her husband's death in 1936. She became the secretary of the Victorian Baby Health Centres Association, helping to establish services for babies' health across the state. During the Second World War, she was an honorary medical officer at the Australian Red Cross Blood Service and became a medical officer for the Free Kindergarten Union of Victoria, a post which she held from 1941 to 1964. She campaigned for the establishment of the Queen Elizabeth Hospital for Mothers and Babies and helped organise its opening in 1958 by Queen Elizabeth the Queen Mother.

She was awarded a Queen Elizabeth II Coronation Medal in 1953 and was appointed an Officer of the Order of the British Empire (OBE) in 1959. She died of a myocardial infarction in 1967 in Richmond, Victoria.
