= Elizabeth Kathleen Turner =

Australian physician (1914–1999)

Elizabeth Turner AO
- Born: Elizabeth Kathleen Turner; 19 August 1914; Victoria, Australia
- Died: 26 December 1999 (aged 85)
- Occupations: Medical Superintendent, Physician, Paediatrician, Neonatal surgeon
- Years active: 1942 - 1980
- Known for: First Doctor to Administer Penicillin in Australia. Superintendent of the Royal Children's Hospital Melbourne 1943-1946.
- Relatives: Dame Phyllis Frost (sister)
- Medical career
- Profession: Physician
- Field: Paediatrics
- Institutions: Royal Children's Hospital Melbourne; Queen Victoria Hospital, Melbourne; The Alfred Hospital

Elizabeth Kathleen Turner AO (19 August 1914 – 26 December 1999) was a physician from Australia, who was the first doctor in Australia to administer penicillin. She held the position of Medical Superintendent of the (Royal) Children's Hospital Melbourne from 1943 until 1946 Turner achieved a number of other Australian firsts, such as performing Australia's first exchange transfusion for severe Rh incompatibility, and identifying Australia's first official case of Turner Syndrome.

In 1991, Turner was made an Officer of the Order of Australia. After her death, the Royal Children's Hospital Melbourne named the Elizabeth Turner Medal in her honour.

== Early life ==
Turner was born in Victoria, Australia, to Irene Turner née Rickard (1887–1973), and Harry Turner (1884–1977). She had two younger sisters, Caroline Nancy Cats née Turner, and Dame Phyllis Frost née Turner and they grew up in Croydon.

Turner was a talented musician, playing piano, concertina, guitar and even a conch shell, and she was very interested in art and had lessons in painting

Turner's family regularly took camping trips to East Gippsland, and she developed a lifelong interest in nature. Her education at Presbyterian Ladies' College, Melbourne further developed her interest with an academic focus on botany and biology and camera, gardens, and outdoor clubs and activities.

== Career ==
Turner attended the Presbyterian Ladies College, Melbourne in Melbourne. She completed her medical training at the Melbourne Medical School. She graduated with an MBBS in 1940. After graduation, Turner started her career at the Alfred Hospital and after a year she moved to the Royal Children's Hospital in Melbourne. In 1948 Turner was awarded an MD for her thesis titled Meningitis in infancy and childhood. She used evidence of 790 Meningitis cases, of which she had personally managed 420.

With only three years of post-graduate experience, Turner was appointed as medical superintendent at the Royal Children's Hospital in 1943. In this role, she worked as an emergency surgeon, a consultant physician, and a hospital administrator.

In 1945, Turner petitioned the government to take action to improve conditions for children in poverty, to prevent social disease such as rheumatic fever. She stated that the disease was associated with malnutrition, and poor living conditions such as over-crowded, damp housing. The children she was treating would go back to the same poor living conditions, only to return to the hospital later with heart conditions.

Turner holds the title for a number of important medical firsts:

- In 1944, she became the first doctor to administer penicillin in Australia. She had negotiated a supply through the US Army Medical Corps who were stationed at the Royal Melbourne Hospital. In 1945, Turner reported that in the three years prior to the arrival of penicillin they had not been able to save any infants presenting with meningitis, but since penicillin the cases were rarely lost.
- She was the first Australian doctor to perform an exchange transfusion for severe Rh incompatibility.
- Furthermore, she was the first Australian doctor to identifying a case of Turner syndrome (the syndrome's name is unrelated to her).
- Long before foetal alcohol syndrome was reported internationally, Turner described the effects of alcohol on the developing foetus.

Turner worked in paediatrics for 50 years, and held a number of senior positions at both the Royal Children's Hospital and the Queen Victoria hospital. She was a consulting paediatrician in the (Royal) Children's Hospital Melbourne until she retired in 1979.

In 1983, Turner gave the 88th presidential address to the Victorian Medical Women's Society, in which she spoke about the importance of remembering the pioneers of women's medicine and the systemic challenges they faced due to their gender. She highlighted the importance of the Victorian Medical Women's Society for these doctors to support each other in facing those challenges.

== Recognition ==
The University of Melbourne awarded Turner a Doctor of Laws honoris causa in 1983. This was awarded during a ceremony which also marked the centenary of Bella Guerin's graduation, the first time the Melbourne University, or any Australian University, had allowed a woman to graduate.

In 1991, Turner was awarded a membership as an Officer of the Order of Australia for "service to paediatrics, particularly as a physician".

The Royal Children's Hospital Melbourne posthumously honoured Turner by naming an award, the Elizabeth Turner medal in her honour, and as recognition of the devotion to the care of her patients. The medal is awarded annually to a senior clinician who has shown sustained excellence in clinical care over time.

== Interest in nature ==
Turner was a member of The Field Naturalists Club of Victoria for over 30 years, serving as member of their council from 1981 until 1982. She served secretary of the Victorian Field Naturalists Clubs Association in the 1980s. She was also a member of the Native Fauna Conservation Society of Victoria. She devoted much of her time to conservation projects.

She wrote a number of articles for The Victorian Naturalist including "Preventive Marsupalian Paediatrics" and "Botany in the Service of Medicine"

She travelled extensively, pursuing her scientific interests in the natural world and documenting them in diaries and on film. After one trip to the Galapagos Islands, Turner gave small lectures to the Field Naturalists Club of Victoria, and was invited to repeat the talk at the LaTrobe Valley Field Naturalists Club.
