= Phyllis Frost =

Australian welfare worker and philanthropist

- Born: Phyllis Irene Turner; 14 September 1917; Brighton, Victoria, Australia
- Died: 30 October 2004 (aged 87); Nunawading, Victoria, Australia
- Other name: Dame Phyllis Frost
- Education: University of Melbourne
- Occupations: welfare worker; philanthropist; physiotherapist
- Known for: Community service
- Relatives: Elizabeth Kathleen Turner (sister)
- Awards: Dame, AC, DBE,

Dame Phyllis Irene Frost AC DBE JP (née Turner; 14 September 1917 – 30 October 2004) was an Australian welfare worker and philanthropist, known for her commitment to causes, such as helping prisoners. She chaired the Victorian Women's Prisons Council for many years, established the Keep Australia Beautiful movement, worked for Freedom from Hunger and raised millions of dollars for charity.

== Career ==
Frost was born Phyllis Irene Turner in 1917 in Brighton, Melbourne to parents Irene Turner née Rickard (1887-1973), and Harry Turner (1884-1977). She had two sisters, Caroline Nancy Cats née Turner, and Elizabeth Kathleen Turner and they grew up in Croydon. She attended Presbyterian Ladies' College, Melbourne and the University of Melbourne, training in physiotherapy and, later, criminology. The latter would help her to better understand the female offenders, to whom she had committed her assistance.

At university she met Glenn Frost, whom she was to marry in 1941; the couple had three daughters.

== Honours ==
Frost was appointed a Commander of the Order of the British Empire (CBE) in the 1963 Queen's Birthday Honours.

She was appointed a Dame Commander of the order (DBE) in the 1974 New Year's Honours, for "outstanding service to the community".

In the 1992 Australia Day Honours, Frost was named a Companion of the Order of Australia (AC).

On 1 January 2001, Frost was awarded the Centenary Medal, "for long and dedicated voluntary service to welfare at local, state and national levels". In the same year she was inducted onto the Victorian Honour Roll of Women.

== Legacy ==
The Victorian government recognised her achievements with women prisoners by renaming the Deer Park Metropolitan Women's Correctional Centre the Dame Phyllis Frost Centre in 2000.

== Death ==
Frost died at aged 87 in Nunawading, Melbourne, Victoria, Australia on 30 October 2004 and was given a state funeral.

The Victorian premier at the time, Steve Bracks paid tribute to Frost, acknowledging her work with around 47 charitable committees and associations. He said that "This work marks her as truly one of the great women this state has produced.''
