= Melbourne Welsh Church =

Welsh church in Melbourne, Australia

Coordinates: 37.81054°S 144.96018°E

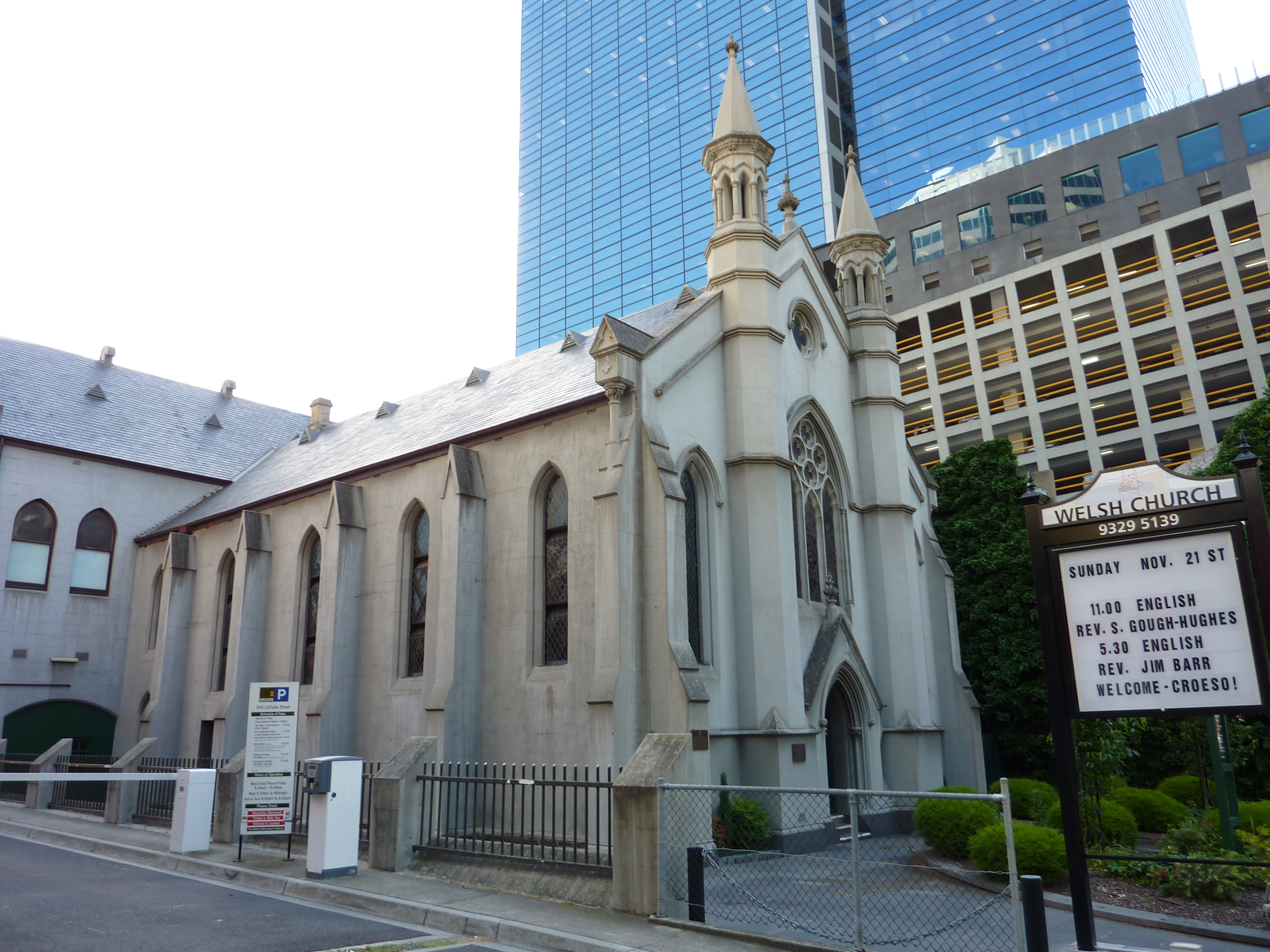
The church in 2010

Melbourne Welsh Church is a church in Melbourne, established in 1857. It is on La Trobe Street, and the building is registered on the Victorian Heritage Register.

The first Welsh-language church service was held on 15 December 1852, and a chapel was first built on the land in La Trobe Street, opening in 1857. The site was donated by the crown, for the construction of a Welsh Calvinist Methodist Church. It was rebuilt in the gothic revival style by architects Crouch & Wilson, opening in 1871. Initially all services were in Welsh, but English-language services were later introduced. Services are still held in Welsh twice a month, as well as in English, and the church holds a Gymanfa Ganu, a singing festival with hymns in both Welsh and English, at least twice a year. The church states that "It is the only Welsh Church in the Pacific Basin that has a minister who conducts services in the Welsh language."

The sign outside the church carries changing inspirational messages, which have been noted in social media. The Bored Panda website illustrated 30 messages and reported that the most popular of these was: "At the end of the day, I'd rather be excluded for who I include than be included for who I exclude".

Pioneering female doctor Constance Stone was married to Reverend David Egryn Jones, minister of the Welsh Church, and through him the church's hall, St David's Hall, was used from 1896 as an out-patient dispensary, called Victoria Hospital for Women and Children, precursor of the Queen Victoria Hospital. In 2016 a memorial plaque was unveiled in the church to commemorate the Australian women doctors who served in the first world war.
