= Constance Ellis =

Australian physician (1872–1942)

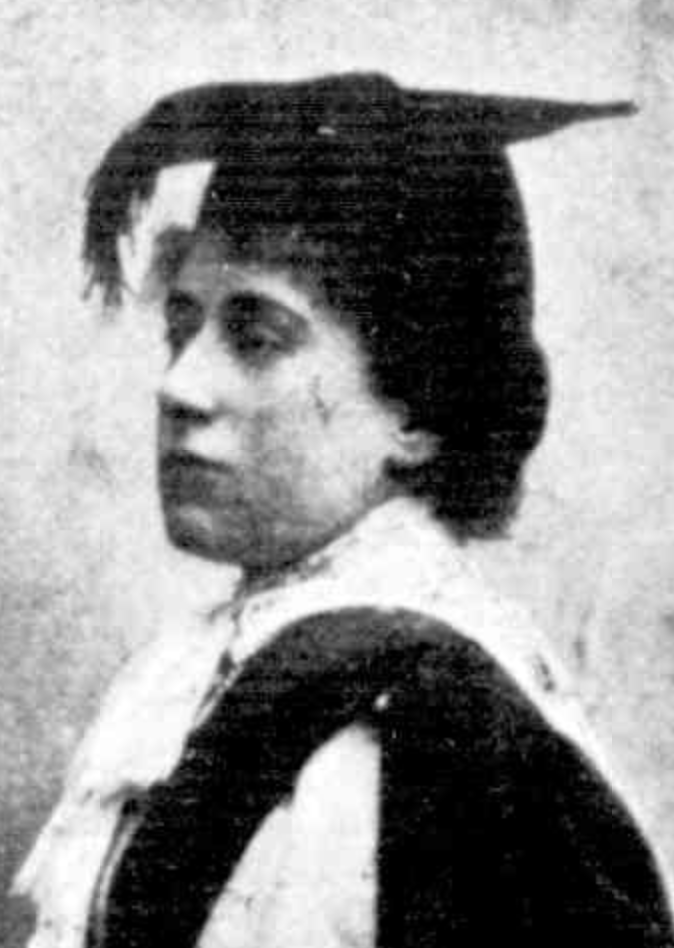
- Constance Ellis, on her graduation in 1899
- Born: 2 November 1872; Carlton, Victoria, Australia
- Died: 10 September 1942 (aged 69); South Yarra, Victoria, Australia
- Education: Presbyterian Ladies' College, Melbourne; University of Melbourne
- Scientific career
- Fields: Obstetrics; Gynaecology; Pathology
- Workplaces: Queen Victoria Hospital, Melbourne

Constance Ellis (2 November 1872 – 10 September 1942) was an Australian medical doctor who specialised in obstetrics, gynaecology and pathology. In 1903 she became the first woman to graduate from the University of Melbourne as a Doctor of Medicine.

== Early life and education ==
Constance Ellis was born in 1872 in Carlton, Victoria, to Lydia Constance (née Phillips) and Louis Ellis, a Victorian sheriff. She attended school at Presbyterian Ladies' College, Melbourne, and graduated in 1890. She studied medicine at the University of Melbourne from 1894 to 1899, finishing second in her class in surgery and third in medicine. After graduating, she completed a year's residency at the Royal Melbourne Hospital and another two years at the Royal Children's Hospital. In 1903 she returned to the University of Melbourne to sit the examination to obtain a Doctor of Medicine; she was the first woman at the university to obtain the degree.

== Career ==
Ellis began working for the Queen Victoria Hospital, Melbourne pathology department in 1902, and served as an honorary pathologist during 1908–19. In the 1920s she was a senior medical officer at the hospital. For four years she was also a demonstrator in pathology at the University of Melbourne under Harry Brookes Allen. She was a founding member and president of the Victorian Medical Women's Society. As its delegate on the Victorian council of the British Medical Association (BMA), she was the first Australian woman doctor to serve as a BMA councillor. She was also a founding member of the Victorian Baby Health Centres Association, and was vice president of the organisation from 1920 until 1942, the year of her death.

Ellis was a founding member of the Women's Automobile Association of Australia in 1918.

== Death and legacy ==
Ellis suffered from Paget's disease and died in 1942 in South Yarra, Victoria.

Ellis Place, in the Canberra suburb of Cook, is named in her honour.
