= Edith Helen Barrett =

Australian medical doctor (1872–1939)

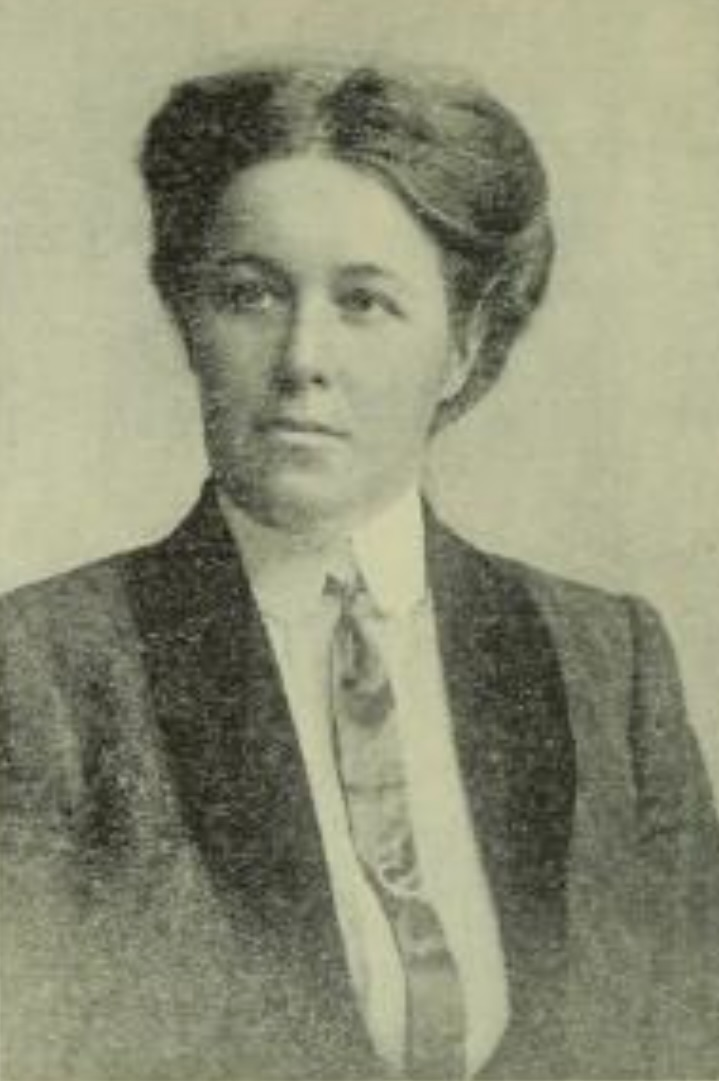
- Barrett in 1914
- Born: 29 October 1872; Emerald Hill, Victoria
- Died: 1 February 1939 (aged 66); Malvern, Victoria
- Education: South Melbourne College; University of Melbourne
- Occupation: Medical doctor

Edith Helen Barrett CBE (29 October 1872 – 1 February 1939) was an Australian medical doctor and a founder of the Bush Nursing Association of Victoria.

== Early life and education ==
Barrett was born on 29 October 1872 in Emerald Hill, Victoria and was one of eight children to parents James and Catherine Barrett. She attended South Melbourne College and in 1897 began to study medicine at the University of Melbourne, graduating M.B. in 1901 and M.D. in 1907.

== Career ==
Barrett worked at the Melbourne Hospital in 1901, and was a member of the honorary medical staff of the Queen Victoria Hospital from 1904 until she retired in 1934.

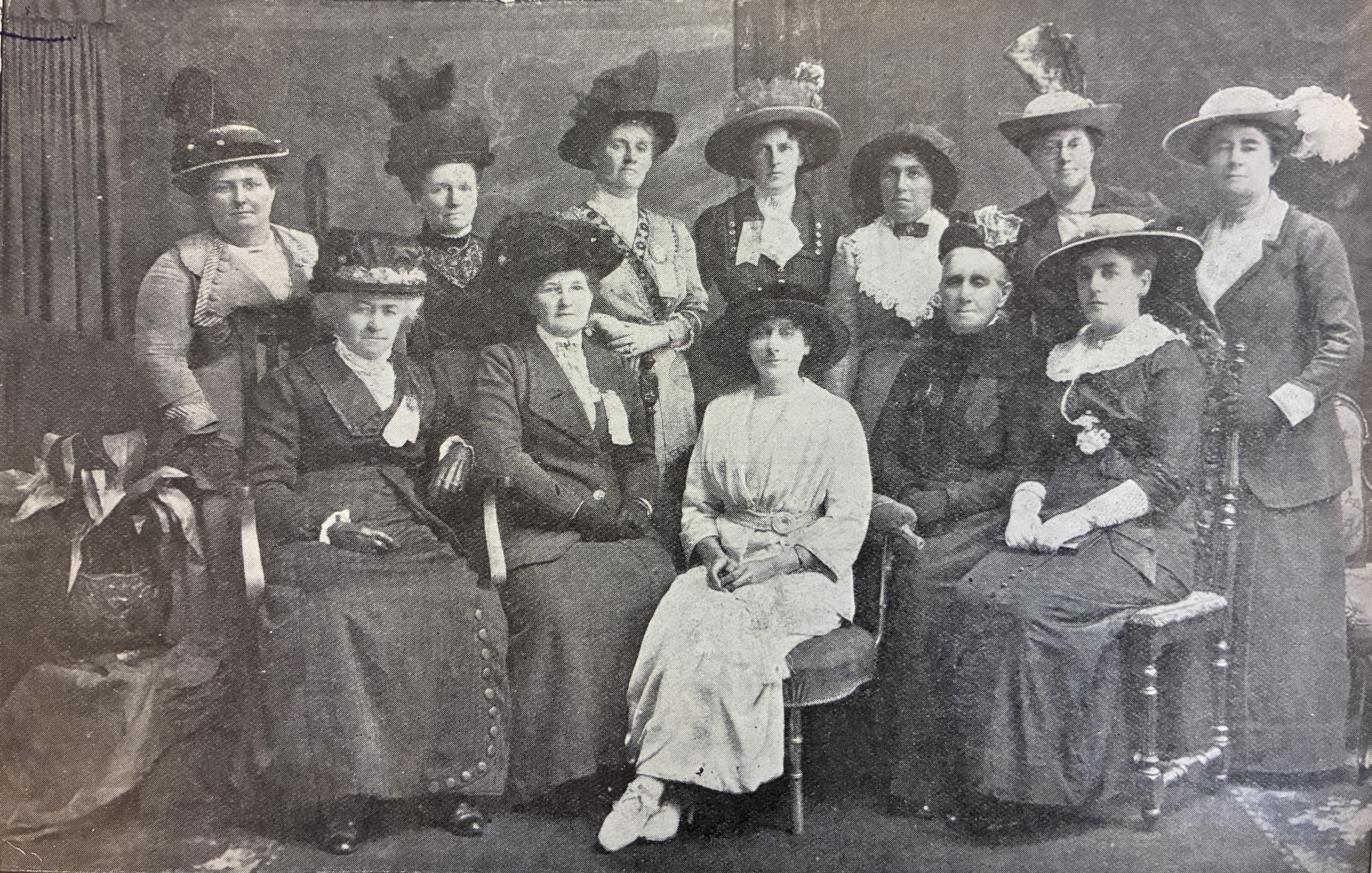
National Council of Women of Australia founding committee, including Barrett

Barrett worked as a general practitioner in Melbourne, and was also much involved in voluntary work. She was among the founders of the Victorian section of the National Council of Women of Australia in 1902, and served as its honorary secretary 1911-1915 and 1921–1926. She was involved in the founding of the Bush Nursing Association of Victoria, and sat on its council representing the Victorian Medical Women's Society. She took over the honorary secretaryships of the Bush Nursing Association of Victoria and the Australian branch of the British Red Cross Society from her brother James when he joined the First Australian Imperial Force in 1914 at the outbreak of World War I, and continued to serve both organisations until the late 1930s. She was appointed both OBE and CBE in 1918 in recognition of her public service on many committees. Barrett was also one of the founders of the National Council of Women of Australia in Victoria.

== Death ==
She died on 1 February 1939, aged 66, in a nursing home in Malvern, Victoria. She died from a heart condition, but a "mental collapse" had "darkened the last years of her life". She is buried in Brighton General Cemetery, Melbourne, where her gravestone also commemorates Grace Mary Barrett (died 21 July 1916), Marian Barrett (died 31 May 1939) and Cara Barrett (died 4 December 1969). Her obituary in The Daily Advertiser described her as "one of the outstanding medical women of Victoria until illness compelled her to retire from active practice some years ago."
