= Helen Sexton =

Australian surgeon (1862–1950)

Major Helen Sexton MBBS
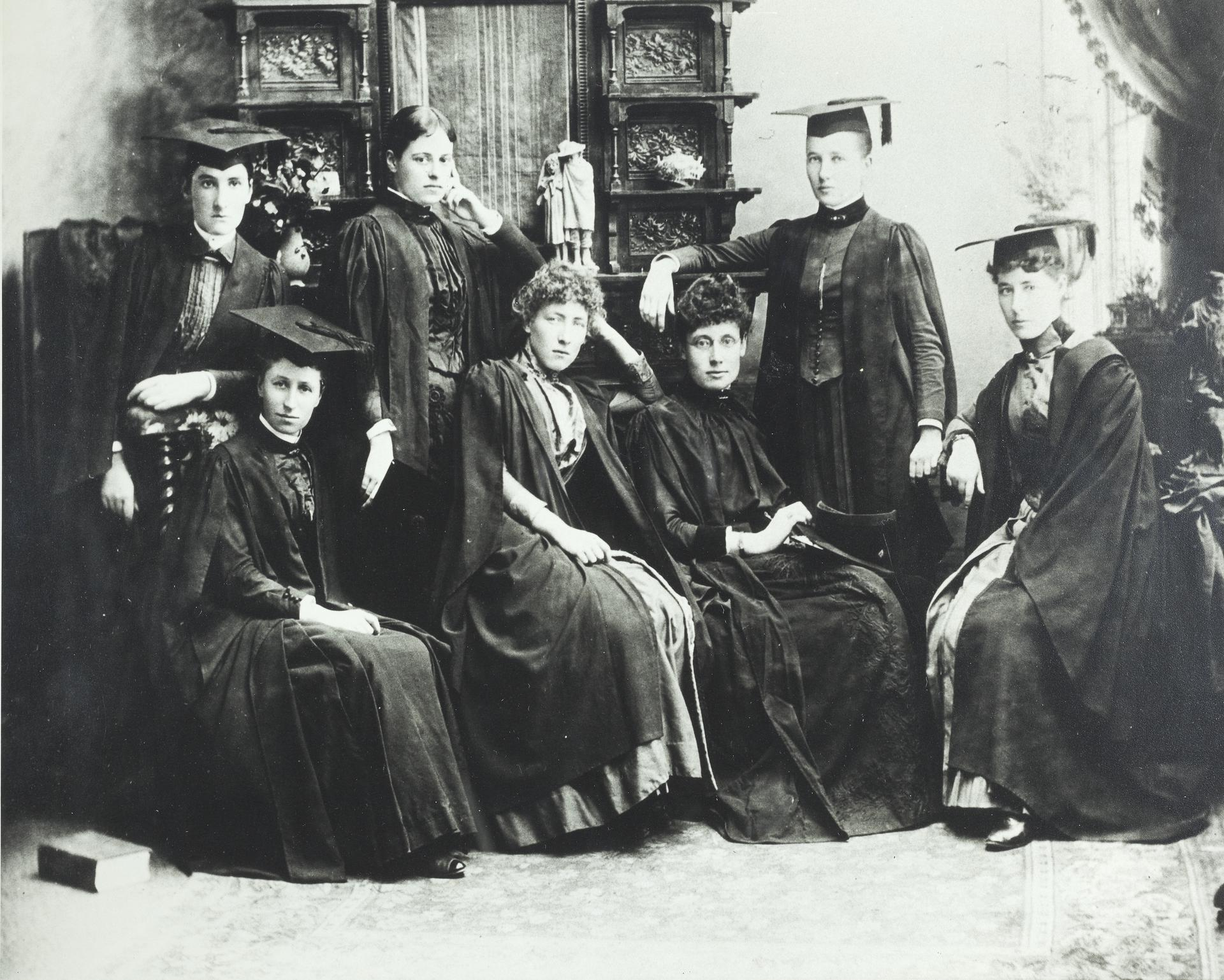
- Helen Sexton 1887
- Born: Hannah Mary Helen Sexton; 21 June 1862; Melbourne, Victoria, Australia
- Died: 12 October 1950 (aged 88); London, England
- Education: University of Melbourne
- Military career
- Allegiance: Allies of World War I
- Branch: French Army
- Service years: c. 1914–1917
- Rank: Major
- Unit: Val-de-Grâce
- Commands: Hôpital Australien de Paris
- Known for: Surgeon
- Conflicts: First World War
- Awards: Medal of French Gratitude

Hannah Mary Helen Sexton MBBS (21 June 1862 – 12 October 1950), known as Helen Sexton, was an Australian surgeon. In 1887, she led a group of seven women to successfully petition the University of Melbourne to lift their ban on women enrolling in medicine. She completed her degree in 1892, and went on to co-found the Queen Victoria Hospital. After retiring from a surgical career in Melbourne, she opened a field hospital, Hôpital Australien de Paris, in France during World War I, achieving the rank of Major in the French Army.

== Early life ==
Hannah Mary Helen Sexton was born on 21 June 1862 in Melbourne. She was the youngest of five children born to Maria and Daniel Sexton, who had migrated from Limerick, Ireland, in 1854.

== Education ==
Sexton attended school in the suburb of Carlton and planned to study medicine, but instead began a Bachelor of Arts at the University of Melbourne because the university's medical school did not admit women. After having their applications to enrol in medicine rejected, Sexton and a classmate, Lilian Helen Alexander, posted a notice in the paper seeking other women who wished to study medicine. They received five responses, Grace Vale, Clara Stone, Margaret Whyte, and sisters Elizabeth and Annie O'Hara. Together these seven women began a campaign to force the university to allow women to enrol in medicine. The women used their influence in the upper classes of Melbourne, to gain media attention, and petitioned the university council over the issue. In February 1887 the university council passed a motion to allow women into the medical school, by 10 votes to three. The seven women enrolled in March 1887, and in the early 1890s, all graduated and were among the first women to practice medicine in Australia.

== Career ==
Sexton graduated with an MBBS in 1892, making her the third woman graduate from the University of Melbourne's medical school. Since most hospitals were reluctant to hire female doctors, Sexton joined a group of women, led by Constance Stone, who co-founded the Queen Victoria Hospital for Women and Children in 1896. When the hospital opened in 1899, Sexton was appointed the head of surgery, a position she held until 1908. In 1899, she also joined the staff of the Royal Women's Hospital as an honorary gynaecological surgeon; she retired in 1910 due to health problems.

Sexton moved to Europe in 1911. After the outbreak of the First World War, both the British Army and the Australian Army declined Sexton's surgical skills for active service. In July 1915, after gathering supplied and staff in Australia, Sexton established a tented field hospital, near Paris with financial support from her Australian colleagues such as Madame Charlotte Crivelli. Sexton collaborated with Constance Ferrier Hamilton, who was known by her married name Mrs Robert O Blackwood, and Susan Ledlie Wilson, who was also known by her married name Mrs William Smith, and Smith's daughters Lorna and Alison. In France, Crivelli's sister, Suzanne Caubet, who worked as a senior volunteer administrator of the Buffon Hospital in Paris was instrumental in aiding in the establishment, supply, and management of the hospital, which was recognised by the French government as a military hospital. Sexton was given the rank of Major within the French Army.

Later in the war, Sexton, and Mrs Blackwood, worked at Val-de-Grâce, a military hospital in Paris where doctors mainly performed reconstructive surgery on injured soldiers.

== Later life and death ==
Sexton returned to Melbourne in 1917 but left for Europe again in 1919, eventually settling in Florence. She suffered from arthritis and Parkinson's disease in her later life, and died in London on 12 October 1950.

== Recognition ==
- In 1919, Sexton, Mrs R. O Blackwood, and Mrs William Smith were each awarded a gold Médaille de la Reconnaissance française or Medal of French Gratitude for their work treating wounded French soldiers.
- Sexton Street in the Canberra suburb of Cook is named in her honour.
- In 2007, Sexton was inducted into the Victorian Honour Roll of Women, for co-founding the Queen Victoria Hospital.
