= Lena McEwan =

Lena McEwan MBBS, MS, FRCS, FRACS
- Born: 11 August 1927; South Australia
- Died: 4 October 2011 (aged 84); Torquay, Victoria
- Education: St Peter's Collegiate Girls School; University of Adelaide; Royal Australasian College of Surgeons
- Occupation: Surgeon
- Medical career
- Profession: Surgeon
- Institutions: Royal Adelaide Hospital; Birmingham Accident Hospital; Royal London Hospital; Prince Henry's Hospital; Queen Victoria Hospital; Peter MacCallum Cancer Hospital

Lena McEwan (11 August 1927 - 4 October 2011) was an Australian physician who was the first woman to specialise in plastic surgery in Australia. She achieved her MBBS in 1949 from the University of Adelaide. McEwan trained in Australia and England, completing her FRCS(Eng) Diploma in 1954 before returning to Adelaide and completing the FRACS Diploma in 1958. She published research on median and ulnar nerve injuries in 1962 which influenced future surgical practice. She was also president of the Victorian Medical Women's Society. McEwan was also part of an interdisciplinary team formed in 1976 to work on gender reassignment who published their work in 1986: Male-to-Female Surgical Genital Reassignment.

Lena McEwan was born on 11 August 1927 in South Australia and her parents had recently immigrated from Glasgow. She was educated at St Peter's Collegiate Girls School and the University of Adelaide.

McEwan worked in the following hospitals:

- Royal Adelaide Hospital (Resident Medical Officer; Senior Surgical Registrar and Honorary Clinical Assistant)
- Birmingham Accident Hospital (Registrar)
- Royal London Hospital (Registrar)
- Royal Melbourne Hospital (Associate then Second Assistant of Benjamin Rank)
- Prince Henry's Hospital (Assistant Plastic Surgeon)
- Queen Victoria Memorial Hospital (Honorary appointment as Plastic Surgeon)
- Queen Victoria Medical Centre
- Peter MacCallum Cancer Hospital (became Head of the Skin Unit in 1982 and retired in 1992)

She moved to Torquay Victoria after her retirement and died from ovarian cancer on 4 October 2011.
