= Ella Macknight =

Australian obstetrician and gynaecologist (1904–1997)

Dame Ella Macknight
- Born: Ella Annie Noble Macknight; 7 August 1904
- Died: 1 April 1997 (aged 92)
- Education: University of Melbourne
- Medical career
- Institutions: Queen Victoria Hospital, Melbourne
- Sub-specialties: Obstetrics, gynaecology

Dame Ella Annie Noble Macknight, DBE, MRCOG, FRCOG, FAMA, FAGO (7 August 1904, Urana, New South Wales – 1 April 1997, Malvern, Victoria) was an Australian obstetrician and gynaecologist who worked at the Queen Victoria Hospital, Melbourne. She was appointed as a Dame Commander of the Order of the British Empire on 1 January 1969 for services to medicine.

She was educated privately and later attended Toorak College. She earned her MB/BS in 1928 from the University of Melbourne, where she was resident from 1923 at Janet Clarke Hall, at that time still the women's residential wing of Trinity College. After qualifying as an obstetrician and gynaecologist (MD, 1931, DGO 1936), she was associated with the Queen Victoria Hospital, Melbourne from 1935 to 1977. Her appointments included honorary obstetrician and gynaecologist from 1935 to 1964, vice-president of the Committee of Management for 1963 to 1971 and president from 1971 to 1977.

She was president of the Council of the Royal College of Gynaecologists from 1970 to 1972 and served as chairmen of the Blood Transfusion Committee, Victorian Division of the Red Cross Society from 1964 to 1970 and a member of the Executive of the Victorian Division during the same period.

== Honours ==
Ella Macknight was appointed as a Dame Commander of the Order of the British Empire for services to medicine on 1 January 1969.

== Death ==
Macknight died on 1 April 1997 in Malvern, Victoria, aged 92.

== Affiliations ==
- 1951 Member of the Royal College of Obstetricians and Gynaecologists (MRCOG)
- 1958 Fellow of the Royal College of Obstetricians and Gynaecologists (FRCOG)
- 1972 Honorary Doctor of Medicine, Monash University, Victoria
- 1973 Fellowship in Australia in Obstetrics and Gynaecology (FAGO)
- 1976 Fellow of the Australian Medical Association (FAMA)
- 1978 Fellow of the Australian College of Obstetricians and Gynaecologists

== Scholarship ==
The Ella Macknight Memorial Scholarship was established in 1998 by the Royal Australian and New Zealand College of Obstetricians and Gynaecologists in memory of Macknight's contributions to obstetrics and gynaecology.
