= John Bernard O'Hara =

Australian poet and schoolmaster (1862–1927)

John O'Hara
- Born: 29 October 1862; Bendigo, Victoria, British Empire
- Died: 31 March 1927 (aged 64); Melbourne, Victoria, Australia
- Burial place: Brighton General Cemetery, Victoria, Australia
- Education: University of Melbourne
- Occupations: Poet and schoolmaster
- Spouse: Agnes Law (m. 1910)
- Parent(s): Patrick O'Hara; Mary Connolly

John Bernard O'Hara (29 October 1862 – 31 March 1927) was an Australian poet and schoolmaster.

== Early life ==
O'Hara was born in Bendigo, Victoria, to schoolteacher Patrick Knight O'Hara (1840-1921). Patrick was also the editor and part proprietor of the Chiltern Leader.

His mother was Mary Ann (Connolly) O'Hara (1846-1895). His sisters Elizabeth O'Hara and Annie O'Hara were both doctors. They were famous for being two of the seven women who enrolled at the University of Melbourne Medical School in 1887, and together becoming the first women admitted to the faculty, and subsequently the first women to graduate as doctors in Australia.

== Bibliography ==
- Songs of the South (1891)
- Songs of the South. Second Series : The Wild White Man and Other Poems (1895)
- Lyrics of Nature (1899)
- Rural Scenes from the Golden West (1900)
- A Book of Sonnets (1902)
- Odes and Lyricsa (1906)
- 'Neath the Southern Cross : Bush Scenes (1909)
- Calypso and Other Poems (1912)
- The Poems of John Bernard O'Hara : A Selection (1918)
- At Eventide : New Poems (1922)
- Sonnets and Rondels (1925)
