= Lorna Verdun Sisely =

Australian surgeon (1916–2004)

Lorna Sisely OBE, FRACS, FACS, CM
- Born: Lorna Verdun Sisely; 14 March 1916; Wangaratta, Victoria
- Died: 27 January 2004 (aged 87)
- Education: Wangaratta High School; Methodist Ladies' College; Janet Clarke Hall; Melbourne University; Royal Australasian College of Surgeons
- Occupation: Surgeon
- Known for: Founding the Queen Victoria Medical Centre Breast Clinic
- Medical career
- Profession: Surgeon
- Institutions: St Vincent's Hospital; Royal Children's Hospital; Melbourne University; Queen Victoria Hospital

Lorna Verdun Sisely (14 March 1916 – 27 January 2004) was a surgeon from Victoria, Australia. She was the founder and the consultant surgeon of the Queen Victoria Medical Centre Breast Clinic, the first of its kind in Victoria. She was admitted as a fellow of the Royal Australasian College of Surgeons in 1947. She was the first woman to do this by passing the RACS Fellowship Examination. She was awarded an OBE in 1980 in recognition of her service to medicine.

== Early life ==
Sisely was born in Wangaratta on 14 March 1916, to Ivy Sisely née Laidler, and Harrie Sisely. She had one sister, Alma May Collins née Sisely. Sisely was born in the year of the Battle of Verdun, which is the origin of her middle name.

Sisely attended first Wangaratta High School, then the Methodist Ladies' College, Melbourne as a boarder from the age of 14, before attending Janet Clarke Hall at the University of Melbourne. Sisely had a strong desire to study medicine, However, her father believed women should focus on getting married, rather than getting an education, and refused to let her study medicine. Eventually, after Lorna declared to her mother "If I can’t practice medicine, I will be no good for anything else", her father allowed her to enrol in a science degree. After a successful first year of her degree her father relented and she switched to medicine in 1937, gaining top awards for all her studies, winning exhibitions in biochemistry, pathology and dermatology, and graduating with honours. She was placed third in her year, and she won the Michael Ryan Scholarship for surgery. She later found out that whenever she won an award, her father would shout rounds at the Wangaratta hotel.

== Career ==
After she completed her studies in 1942, Sisely took a role as a junior resident at St Vincent's Hospital, and after her ability and potential was recognised by Sir Hugh Devine and Leo Doyle, she became the assistant to the senior surgeon in 1944.

=== Master of Surgery and Queen Victoria Memorial Hospital (QVMH) ===
In 1947, Sisely successfully passed the Royal Australasian College of Surgeons (RACS) Fellowship Examination, becoming the first woman to do so. There were other women who were fellows of RACS, Lilian Violet Cooper was the first admitted in 1928, however they were already trained and experience surgeons, not required to sit the entrance examination. As well as beginning her Master of Surgery training in 1947, she also left St Vincent's Hospital to take an appointment as an honorary surgeon and senior staff member at the QVMH, a position she held for 34 years. When she started in the role, the hospital's surgical duties were shared between a gynaecologist, a doctor with an MS, and two self-trained surgeons. She was the assistant surgeon to Dr Florence Cooper. That same year, she also took a role as an honorary surgeon at the Children's Hospital, as well as a role as an Anatomy Demonstrator in the Department of Anatomy and Pathology at the University of Melbourne.

=== Travel scholarship to England and the US ===
Sisely won the Gordon Craig Scholarship in Surgery, a travelling scholarship, from the Royal Australasian College of Surgeons in 1949. She received her Master of Surgery certificate from the University of Melbourne (becoming the second woman to do so after Girlie Hodges), and two weeks later, On 20 April 1949, she left Australia on the Strathaird. Having identified the need for a urologist at the QVMH she used the funds to travel to England and then United States for 8 months each to undertake work in both general surgery and urology at various clinics. She found the experience to be very beneficial having been able to observe leading surgeons, as well as new techniques and technology. She stated that "I touched on everything. I saw the man who operated on Anthony Eden. I saw lots of hard, difficult work." However, Sisely commented on the lack of acceptance of women surgeons in USA. She speculated that she would have had to enter general practice had she stayed in USA. She met women who were in research as a second choice, while awaiting an appointments in surgery.

=== Developing the surgical service at the QVMH, which was renamed Queen Victoria Medical Centre (QVMC) ===
On her return, Sisely began to develop the surgical service of the QVMC, and as new specialist areas arose she sought out consultants to fill the positions. Sisely took another trip to the US and England to gain more experience, she while there she searched for more recruits to work at the hospital. While visiting the Royal Free Hospital she met surgeon Joyce Daws and offered her a position at the hospital. Daws moved to Australia in 1956 and commenced a role at QVMC.

As the QVMC grew larger, a male ward was opened, and the Monash University obstetrics, gynaecology, and paediatrics departments moved in. With the support of the staff, Sisely petitioned the board to make more appointments in both the general units, and the specialist units. This resulted in the unprecedented move of men being appointed to senior positions at the hospital.

Sisely founded the Breast Clinic at the QVMC, which any woman could self-refer to if they were concerned about breast lumps or symptoms. This clinic was the first of its kind in Australia. this became the Monash Medical Centre Breast Clinic which was named in her honour the Lorna Sisely Breast Clinic. After she retired, she visited the clinic fortnightly to assist with operations.

=== Other achievements ===
- In 1962 Sisely became a member of the American College of Surgeons,
- From 1964 until 1981, Sisely was a member of the Anti-Cancer Council of Victoria.
- From 1980 until 1981 she held the position of Dean of the clinical school at the QVMC.
- She was a member of the Urological Society of Australia and New Zealand. She was the first woman accepted as a member.
- In 1980, Sisely was recognised for her service to medicine during the Queen's Birthday honours, she was appointed an Officer of the Order of the British Empire (OBE).
- In 2001, she was awarded a Centenary Medal for her services to medicine.
