= Queen Victoria Hospital, Melbourne =

Hospital in Melbourne, Australia, (1896–1987)

The Queen Victoria Hospital
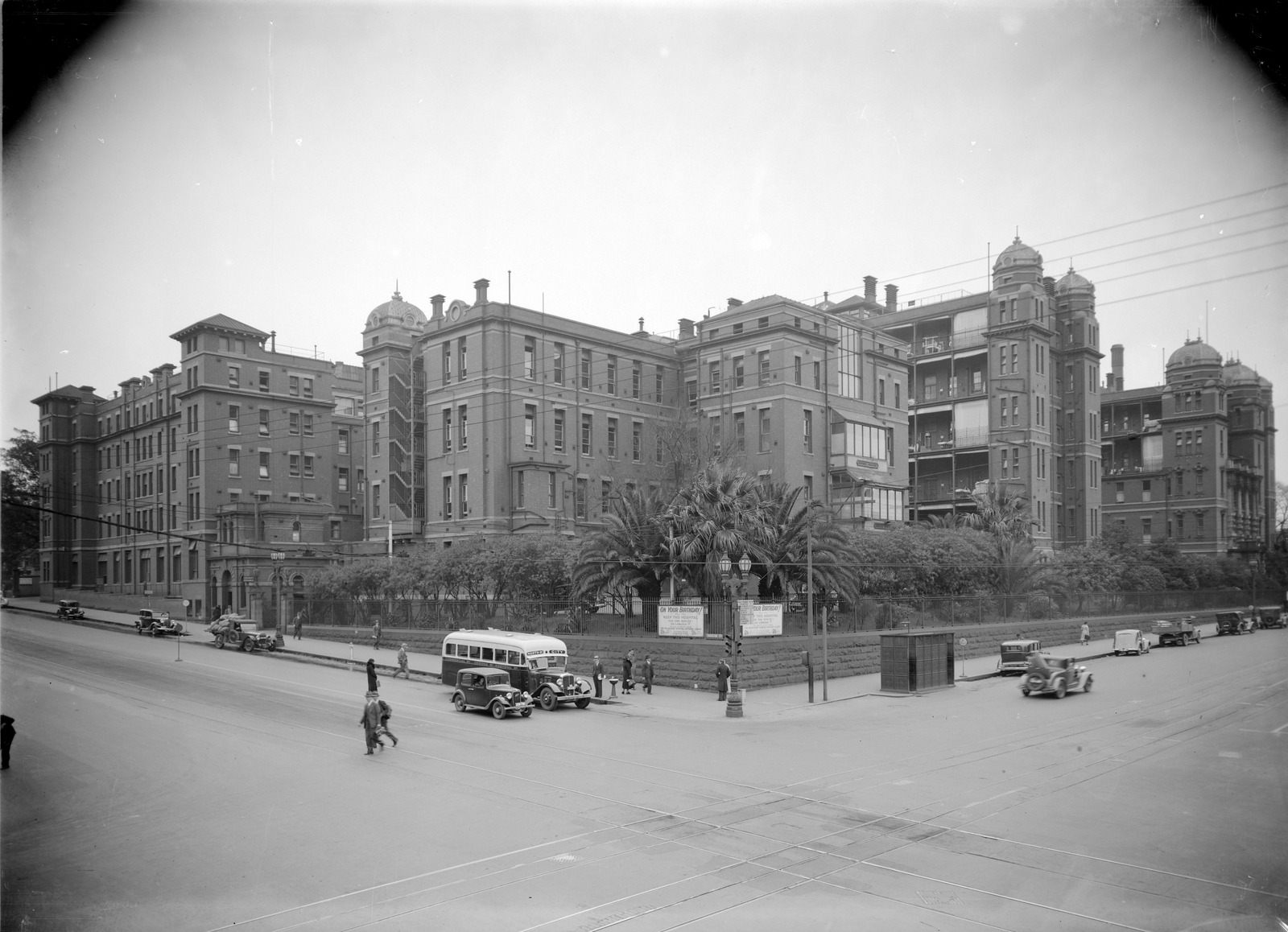
- Queen Victoria Hospital, 1945

Geography
- Location: Lonsdale Street, Melbourne, Victoria, Australia

Organisation
- Care system: Public Medicare (AU)
- Type: Teaching
- Affiliated university: Victorian Medical Women's Association, Monash University

Services
- Speciality: obstetrics, gynaecology and paediatrics

History
- Former names: Victoria Hospital for Women and Children (1896-1897); Queen Victoria Hospital for Women and Children (1897-1897); Queen Victoria Memorial Hospital (1897-1977); Queen Victoria Medical Centre (1977-1987)
- Opened: 1896
- Closed: 1987

Links
- Lists: Hospitals in Australia

The Queen Victoria Hospital (QVH) was a hospital in Melbourne Victoria which founded in 1896, and closed in 1987. It was the first women's hospital in Victoria created by women, for women.

== History ==
Founded as the Victoria Hospital for Women and Children by Constance Stone, and other women who formed the Victorian Medical Women's Society in September 1896, it initially ran as a free out-patient clinic and dispensary for St David's Welsh Church.

In 1897 the name was changed briefly to Queen Victoria Hospital for Women and Children, until 30 April 1897 when it was incorporated as a hospital and charity institution called the Queen Victoria Memorial Hospital. In this year, Stone drove a Jubilee Shilling Fund appeal, eventually raising enough to buy the old Governess's Institute in Mint Place.

The hospital provided gynaecological and obstetric services, and a venereal disease clinic to service the city's sex workers. The hospital became known for its woman-focussed culture, and feminist values. A private wing called the Jessie McPherson Community Hospital opened in 1931.

In 1946, the hospital moved to the premises in Lonsdale Street.

=== Lonsdale street site ===
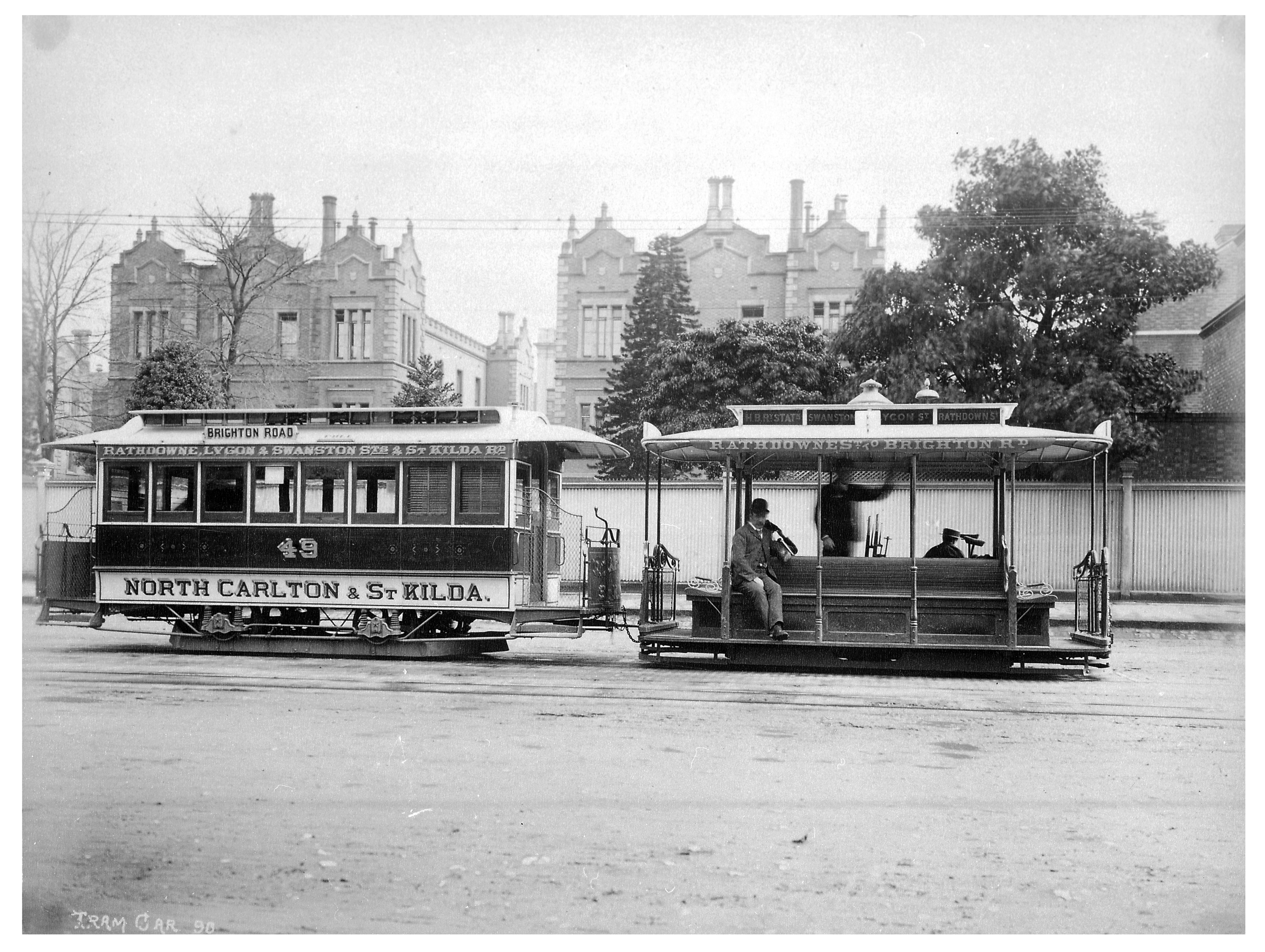
Cable tram dummy and trailer passing the QVH on route between Carlton and St Kilda in 1905.

The site was originally the Melbourne Hospital, built in the 1840s—1860s as series of Tudor style buildings. The hospital was completely rebuilt on a much larger scale between 1910–1916 to a design by architect John James Clark in partnership with his son E. J. Clark. The hospital was composed of several five and six-storey Edwardian pavilions or towers, running north–south, housing the ward blocks, each with open verandahs for patients to convalesce in the open air. Tudor domed cupolas topped the front corners of each tower.

The hospital became the Royal Melbourne Hospital in 1935, and moves began to relocate to a former pig market site in Parkville. The new hospital was completed in 1941 but was occupied as a military hospital during the war. The move finally took place in 1944, and the old buildings were then occupied by the Queen Victoria Hospital, established 'by women for women' in 1896 and renamed the Queen Victoria Memorial Hospital in 1901 after the queen's death.

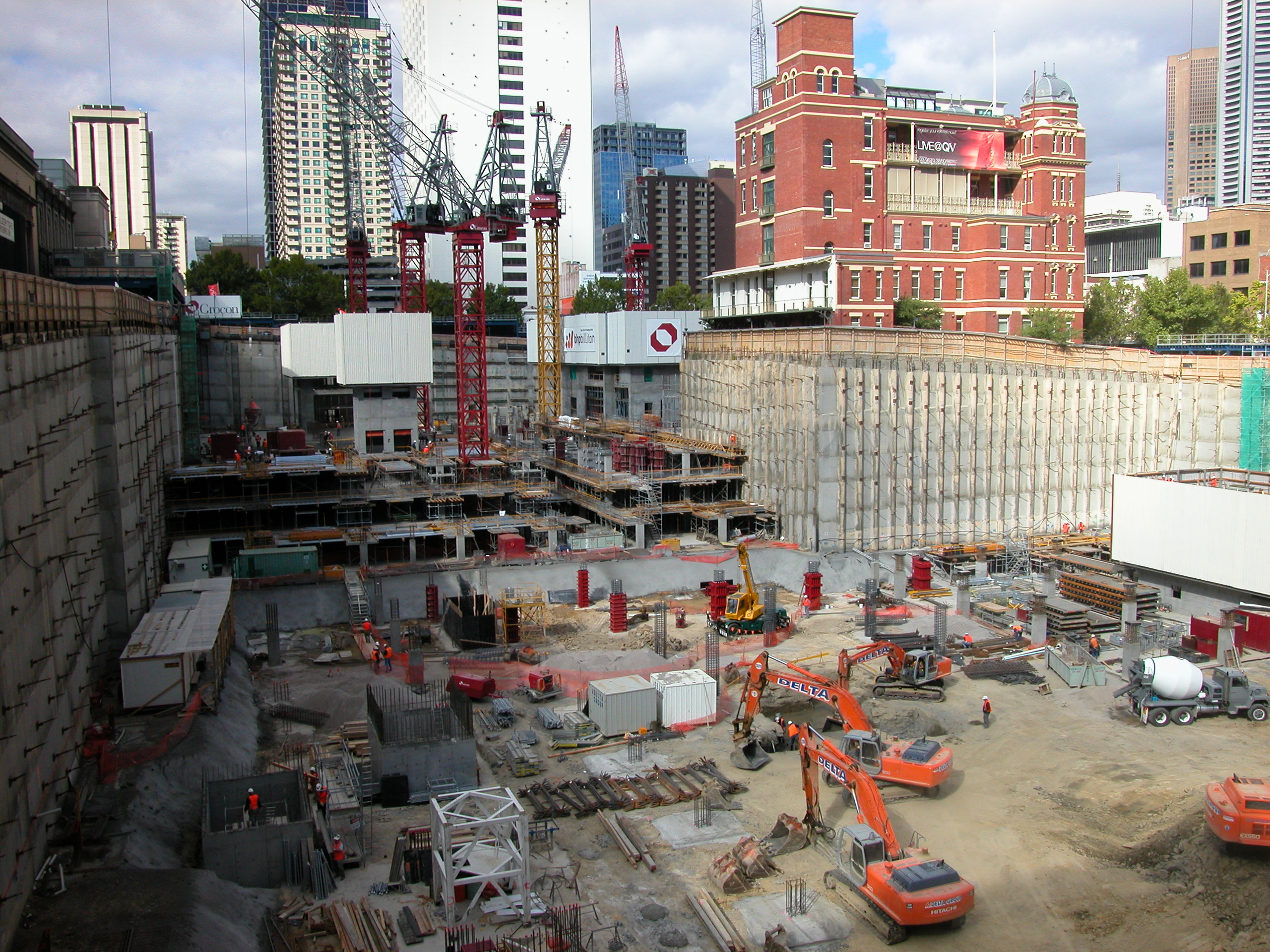
The construction site in March 2002

In 1986, with the pending relocation and amalgamation of the hospital, the site was to be redeveloped to house expansions of the State Library and Museum located on the block next door to the north, and a competition was held, with a condition being the preservation of the three towers. One such design by post-modern architects Edmond & Corrigan included a giant pyramid as the new book stacks on Swanston Street. The hospital was closed in 1987, and the site was valued at A$63 million. During the financial squeeze of the early 1990s, it was eventually sold for only $15 million to property developer David Marriner in 1992, who immediately on-sold to the Government of Nauru. All but three of the hospital pavilions were demolished in the following years, with the final two that would have been preserved demolished in 1994 with a permit from then Planning Minister Rob Maclellan over-ruling the Historic Buildings Council. The site remained vacant for some time, eventually reverting to the control of the City of Melbourne in 1999, who awarded Grocon the tender the development of the Queen Victoria Village, or QV, a complex of offices, apartments, and shops, with the remaining pavilion occupied by the Queen Victoria Women's centre.

== Founders ==
- Constance Stone – Australian physician and feminist (1856–1902)
- Annette Bear-Crawford – Suffragist and social reformer (1853–1899)
- Emily Mary Page Stone – Australian medical doctor (1865–1910)
- Bertha Main Leitch (1873–1957)
- Elfreda Hilda Gamble (1871–1947)
- Marie Elizabeth Amy Castilla – Australian medical doctor (1868–1899)
- Helen Sexton – Australian surgeon (1862–1950)
- Gertrude Halley – Australian physician and feminist (1867–1939)
- Janet Lindsay Greig – Australian anaesthetist (1874–1950)
- Jane Stocks Greig – Scottish-Australian medical doctor and public health specialist (1872–1939)
- Lilian Helen Alexander – Australian surgeon (1861–1934)
- Grace Clara Stone – Australian medical doctor (1860–1957)

== Notable employees ==
- Mary Sophia Alston – Australian philanthropist (1856–1932)
- Ellen Balaam – Australian physician (1891-1985)
- Edith Helen Barrett – Australian medical doctor (1872–1939)
- Mabel Brookes – Australian humanitarian and socialite (1890–1975)
- Vera Scantlebury Brown – Australian pediatrician (1889–1946)
- Kate Isabel Campbell – Australian physician and paediatrician (1899–1986)
- Margaret Gardiner Cuthbertson – Australian Factory Inspector (1864–1944)
- Mary De Garis – Australian medical doctor (1881–1963)
- Constance Ellis – Australian physician (1872–1942)
- Reta Mildred Findlay – Australian businesswoman (1893-1954)
- Mary Glowrey – Australian physician and religious sister (1887–1957)
- Girlie Hodges – Australian surgeon and field hockey player (1904-1999)
- June Howqua – Australian medical doctor and cardiologist (1821–2009)
- Jessie Margaret Langham – Australian nurse (1902-1988)
- Lorna Lloyd-Green – Australian obstetrician-gynecologist (1910-2002)
- Kate Mackay – Australian physician and public servant
- Ella Macknight – Australian obstetrician and gynaecologist (1904–1997)
- Janie Mason – Australian nurse, educator and unionist
- Lena McEwan
- Isabelle E. Merry – Australian congregational minister and chaplain (1907–2002)
- Eliza Fraser Morrison– Australian charity worker (1864–1948)
- Doris Lyne Officer – English-Australian physician and paediatrician (1898-1967)
- Susie O'Reilly – Australian obstetrician (1881-1960)
- Olive Paschke – Australian Army matron (1905-1942)
- Una Porter – Australian psychiatrist and philanthropist (1900-1996)
- Joan Refshauge – Australian physician (1906-1979)
- Edna Roper – Australian politician (1913-1986)
- Lorna Verdun Sisely – Australian surgeon (1916–2004)
- Elizabeth Kathleen Turner – Australian physician (1914–1999)
- Margaret Whyte – Australian medical doctor (1868-1946)
- Gweneth Wisewould – Australian medical practitioner (1884–1972)
- Carl Wood – Australian gynaecologist (1929–2011)
