= Lorna Lloyd-Green =

Australian obstetrician-gynecologist (1910-2002)

Lorna Lloyd-Green, CBE (4 February 1910 – 24 June 2002) was an Australian obstetrician-gynecologist and the president of the Medical Women's International Association from 1968 to 1972. She was the first woman to be elected a fellow of the Australian Medical Association. As one of the first women physicians in Melbourne, she advocated for women in medicine throughout her career, and is credited for playing the principal role in achieving equal pay for women physicians in Australia.

== Early life and education ==
Lorna Lloyd-Green was born on 4 February 1910 in Melbourne, Australia. Her father was a veterinarian and her mother a former school-teacher. She had three siblings. Lloyd-Green attended Penleigh Presbyterian Girls School, Moonee Ponds and Lowther Hall Anglican Grammar School in Essendon from 1920, and then went on to study medicine at the University of Melbourne in 1928. Lloyd-Green graduated from the University of Melbourne with an MBBS degree in 1933.

== Career ==
She began practicing at the Royal Melbourne Hospital. She was superintendent of the Queen Victoria Hospital for Women and Children in 1940. In 1947, Lloyd-Green became a member of the Royal College of Obstetricians and Gynaecologists. She received honours for her work in obstetrics and gynecology and her advocacy. LLoyd-Green founded an infertility clinic at the Queen Victoria Hospital, which would later become the Monash IVF Clinic. Lloyd-Green also helped to found the Australian College of Obstetricians and Gynaecologists.

In 1989 she retired from medicine and became a music therapist.

She worked for almost fifty years and had delivered thousands of babies in that time, in addition to providing care to women and nursing mothers.

== Personal life ==
Lloyd-Green did not marry . She died on 24 June 2002.

== Legacy ==
She was honoured for her work and her advocacy of equal pay for women doctors, as a Fellow of the Australian Medical Association.

An annual music scholarship is given in her name by St Hilda's College at the University of Melbourne.

== Awards and honours ==
- President, Victorian Women's Medical Society (1948)
- Vice-President, Australian Federation of Medical Women (1950–1954; 1962–1965)
- Vice-President, Medical Women's International Association (1958–1968)
- Officer of the Order of the British Empire (OBE; 1968)
- Fellow, Australian Medical Association (1969)
- Woman of the Year (1970)
- Commander of the Order of the British Empire (CBE; 1979)
- Commonwealth Recognition Award for Senior Australians (2000)
- Victorian Honour Roll of Women (2001)
- Fellow, Australian College of Obstetricians and Gynaecologists
