= Mary Glowrey =

Australian physician and religious sister (1887–1957)

Venerable Mary Glowrey JMJ
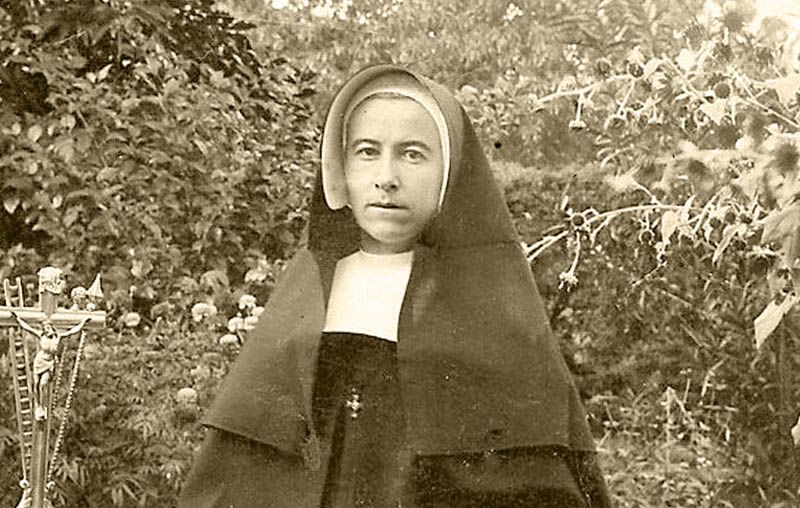
- Venerable Mary of the Sacred Heart Glowrey, c. 1920
- Born: 23 June 1887; Birregurra, Victoria, Australia
- Died: 5 May 1957 (aged 69); Bangalore, Bayalu Seeme, India

Mary Glowrey JMJ, religious name Mary of the Sacred Heart, (1887–1957) was an Australian-born religious sister and educated doctor who spent 37 years in India, where she set up healthcare facilities, services and systems. She is believed to be the first religious sister to practise as a doctor. The Catholic Church is investigating her cause for beatification and declared her a Servant of God in 2013. On 21 November 2025 Pope Leo XIV recognised Mary Glowrey as having lived a life of ‘heroic virtue’, according her the title of a Venerable.

== Early life ==
Mary Glowrey was born in the Victorian town of Birregurra on 23 June 1887. Her family moved to Garvoc, then north to Watchem, in Victoria’s Mallee region. Her father, Edward Glowrey, operated the general store at Birregurra, then hotels at Garvoc and Watchem. She was the niece of John Glowrey, a member of the Western Australian Legislative Council and mayor of Coolgardie.

== Education ==
In 1901 Glowrey came fourth of 700 entrants in a Victorian State Education secondary scholarship exam. From 1901 to 1904 she attended South Melbourne College (SMC), in Bank Street, South Melbourne. She boarded at the Good Shepherd Convent in Albert Park. She matriculated at the end of her first year at SMC and won an Exhibition (scholarship) to study at the University of Melbourne. Since she was too young to go to university, she continued studying subjects at SMC for the next three years.

In 1905 Glowrey completed her first year of a Bachelor of Arts course at the University of Melbourne. She was a student at Ormond College. In 1906, she transferred her course and scholarship to study medicine at the university. She attended the first year of the St Vincent's Hospital, Melbourne Clinical School in 1910. She graduated with a Bachelor of Medicine and Bachelor of Surgery in 1910.

Glowrey later returned to the University of Melbourne to undertake higher medical studies, graduating with a Doctor of Medicine in 1919 in obstetrics, gynaecology and ophthalmology.

== Melbourne medical career ==
In 1911, Glowrey became the first female doctor at Christchurch Hospital and one of the first two women appointed to a residency position in New Zealand. She returned to Melbourne in 1912. Her medical appointments in Melbourne included positions at Queen Victoria Memorial Hospital, the Royal Victorian Eye and Ear Hospital and St Vincent’s Hospital.

In October 1916, the Catholic Women’s Social Guild was formed at a meeting at Cathedral Hall, Brunswick Street, Fitzroy. Glowrey was the Guild's inaugural president. In that role, she gave lectures and wrote articles about some of the economic and social problems faced by women.

Glowrey boarded at the Royal Victorian Eye and Ear Hospital from 1915 to 1919 and took on many of the medical duties of the male doctors who signed up to serve in the First World War. She also had a private practice in Collins Street, Melbourne during these years.

== Life in India ==
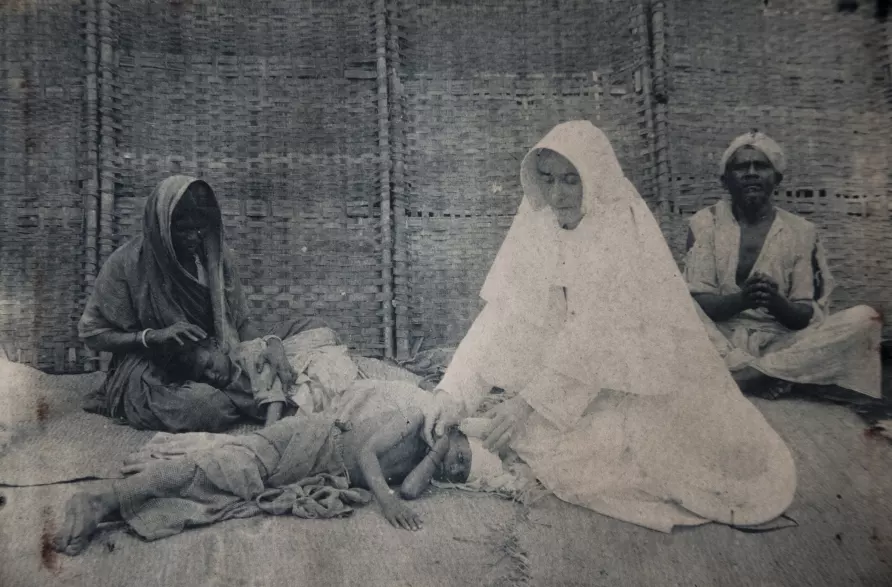
Mary Glowrey with a patient with leprosy in Guntur, India circa 1926

In October 1915, Glowrey read a pamphlet about the life of Agnes McLaren, a pioneering Scottish missionary doctor, and the need for women doctors in India, and felt called to serve as a medical missionary doctor there.

Glowrey discerned this religious vocation over subsequent years with her spiritual director, Father William Lockington SJ. She left Melbourne on 21 January 1920 and never returned to Australia. She arrived in Guntur, India on 12 February. She joined the Congregation of Jesus Mary Joseph and took the religious name Mary of the Sacred Heart.

In 1922, after the completion of her novitiate, Glowrey began practising as a doctor. The basic dispensary where Glowrey began her medical mission work in Guntur grew into St Joseph’s Hospital. Glowrey provided direct medical care for hundreds of thousands of patients, most of them marginalised women. She trained local women to be compounders (dispensers), midwives and nurses.

In 1943 Glowrey founded the Catholic Health Association of India (then called the Catholic Hospitals' Association). Today, its 3500+ members auspice the care of more than 21 million annually.

== Death and legacy ==
Glowrey died in Bangalore from cancer on 5 May 1957 at 69 years of age.

She was inducted onto the Victorian Honour Roll of Women in 2015.

On the occasion of the Catholic Health Association of India's Platinum Jubilee in 2018, Liliane Fonds announced funding for Mary Glowrey - Liliane Brekelmans Disability Awards.

The Mary Glowrey Museum in Melbourne published her partial autobiography with commentary in 2021.

On 21 November 2025 Pope Leo XIV issued a decree which recognised her life of heroic virtues and thus accorded her the title Venerable.

The St John's Medical College Alumni Association, presents the Sr Dr Mary Glowrey Award, its most prestigious award, among its deserving alumni, to recognize outstanding contributions to improving healthcare among underserved communities.
