= Lilian Helen Alexander =

Australian surgeon (1861–1934)

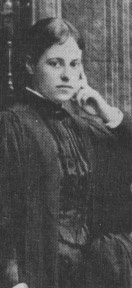
- Lilian Helen Alexander at the University of Melbourne, 1887
- Born: 15 March 1861; St Kilda, Victoria, Australia
- Died: 18 October 1934 (aged 73); South Yarra, Victoria
- Occupation: Surgeon
- Known for: one of the first women to study medicine at University of Melbourne

Lilian Helen Alexander (15 March 1861 – 18 October 1934) was an Australian surgeon and one of the first women to study medicine at the University of Melbourne.

== Early life ==
Alexander was born in 1861 at St Kilda, Victoria to Jane and Thomas Alexander. Her father was an English-born printer and bookseller while her mother (Jane née Furnell) was an Irish-born school administrator. She attended Lawn House, the school run by her mother, and Presbyterian Ladies' College before enrolling at the University of Melbourne. She graduated with a Bachelor of Arts in 1886 and a Master of Arts in 1888 and was the first female student admitted to the university's Trinity College, "against considerable opposition", making her the first woman to be admitted to any Australian university's residential college. After graduating, Alexander worked as a schoolteacher at Ruyton Girls' School.

== Medical career ==
In 1887, after she and Helen Sexton petitioned the university, Alexander became one of the first five women to be admitted to the University of Melbourne Faculty of Medicine. She received her Bachelor of Medicine in 1893, becoming a qualified medical doctor, and completed her medical residency at the Royal Women's Hospital in Carlton.

Alexander was involved in the creation of the Queen Victoria Hospital for Women and Children, a hospital for women run by women doctors, and was one of the hospital's original staff members alongside Constance Stone and a number of other recent female medical graduates. Alexander specialised in surgery after gaining her Bachelor of Surgery in 1901, and worked at the Queen Victoria Hospital until 1917. She practised medicine privately until 1928. In 1931, she was elected president of the Victorian Medical Women's Society after serving as the society's first secretary since 1896.

== Death and legacy ==
Alexander died at her South Yarra home in 1934. She never married, but cared for four of her nephews after her sister's death in 1913. In 1936, following Alexander's death, her nephews donated a sculpture titled "The Wheel of Life" by Charles Web Gilbert to the University of Melbourne in Alexander's memory. She was posthumously inducted onto the Victorian Honour Roll of Women in 2007.

== See also ==
- Victorian Medical Women's Society
