= Grace Vale =

Australian physician and suffragist (1860–1933)

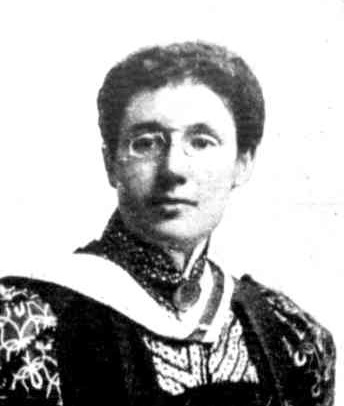
- Grace Vale in Melbourne c. 1894
- Born: 14 May 1860; Richmond, Victoria, Australia
- Died: 22 December 1933 (aged 73); Black Rock, Victoria, Australia
- Education: University of Melbourne
- Occupation: medical doctor
- Known for: Women’s rights advocate; Public health advocate
- Relatives: Richard Taylor Vale (Uncle)

Grace Vale (14 May 1860 – 22 December 1933) was an Australian medical doctor and suffragist who devoted much of her career to improvement of health services for women and children in Victoria and New South Wales in the late 1800s and early 1900s, especially in rural areas. In 1887, she was one of the seven women who convinced Melbourne University to lift their ban on women studying medicine, so they could enrol. She became one of the first women to graduate as a medical doctor in Australia.

== Early life and education ==
Grace Vale was born in the then British colony of Victoria, in the Melbourne suburb of Richmond, on 14 May 1860. She was the first of six daughters of bookseller and later prominent Victorian politician, William Mountford Kinsey Vale (1833–1895) and his wife Rachel Lennox. Her sister, May Vale, was an Australian painter. Grace Vale received part of her education in England, where her parents had married the year before her birth, but was mostly educated in Victoria. She passed her matriculation examination in 1882, and had been studying biology at Melbourne University in 1887 when she became one of seven members of a group who, despite some strong opposition, were admitted as its first female medical school students. Before her graduation in 1894, some of her clinical experience was gained at the Alfred and Women's and Children's Hospitals.

== Career and other activities ==
After graduating, Vale went into private practise, taking over the Collins Street consulting rooms in Collins Street formerly used by Margaret Whyte, a fellow Melbourne University graduate who had suspended practising after getting married. Outside her daily medical practice, Vale took a leading role in a range of groups. In March 1895, she was a foundation member of the Victorian Medical Women's Society. The following month, she was elected one of the vice-presidents of the Victorian Woman's Suffrage League. The election came at the annual meeting of the League, held in the rooms of the Woman's Christian Temperance Union of Victoria, another organisation in which Vale would play a prominent part. Early in 1896, it was through the WCTU, that she would become involved in a scheme to provide free medical advice and "at cost" medicines to female factory workers in Melbourne. She would also be vice-president of a Working Girls' Recreation and Improvement Club in the inner suburb of Collingwood, which her father had once represented in the Victorian Legislative Assembly, and where he had died from Bright's disease a few months earlier.

However, despite her early activities in Melbourne, Vale was destined to become the only pioneer female medical graduate not to spend the majority of her career in an Australian capital city. In April 1896, Vale left Melbourne to set up a new private practice in the Victorian gold mining city of Ballarat, which her father had also represented in the Legislative Assembly. At the time of her move, the Assembly seat of Ballarat West previously held by her father was held by her uncle, Richard Taylor Vale. He shared her commitment to women’s suffrage, and for example when he chaired a "well-attended" public meeting in Ballarat to advocate the cause, she would be on the platform with him.

After establishing her new practice in Ballarat, Vale took on many other activities, mainly related to women's or children's health or welfare. By September 1898, she was President of Ballarat's Women’s Health and Home Protection Society, which provided cookery and other classes for women, and through the WCTU she would promote healthy diets for women.

The following year, Vale became one of the first two female members of the influential Ballarat City Board of Advice, set up to monitor conditions in government schools. Advocates of female suffrage were reportedly "jubilant" at the appointments. Vale would remain on the Board of Advice for about a decade, serving periods as its president and vice-president. As a board member, issues she would promote would include cooking classes for girls, and swimming classes for all children, including girls, at a time when they had been mainly for boys.

From 1906 to 1909, Vale was one of two vice-presidents of the Victorian School Boards Association. At its annual conference in Bendigo in 1908, she moved a successful motion calling for the regular fumigation of all Victorian state schools "and not by the burning of a cake of sulphur in the building, as is now generally done". She successfully raised the issue again at the Association's conference the following year in Ballarat, but was defeated in a move to have first aid lessons substituted for the preliminary artistic skill of "brush work" in government schools. First aid had long been one of Vale's passions, often giving lectures through the St John Ambulance Association in Ballarat.

Vale was president of the Ballarat Board of Advice in 1908, when Victoria became the last Australian state to give women the right to vote. She then lobbied the newly-elected Victorian government to spend more on Ballarat's state schools and an accommodation facility for kindergarten teachers.

Vale made no secret of her affinity with the Liberal Party. Early in 1910, she was elected president of the Ballarat women's branch of the Commonwealth Liberal League, a national group set up to support Liberal Party candidates. In May 1910, soon after he had lost a federal election, former Liberal Prime Minister and now Opposition Leader Alfred Deakin accepted an invitation to address a meeting of the Ballarat women's branch, chaired by Vale. Thirty years earlier, before Vale's father briefly served as Victoria's Attorney-General, he and Deakin had shared a room in Melbourne as young barristers.

In October 1910, Vale became the first woman to be appointed a Public Vaccinator in Victoria. Her appointment covered the whole south-western district of the state. Under state legislation, those holding such positions provided free compulsory vaccinations to children of parents who could not afford obtain them from their normal family doctor. Another area of Vale’s involvement in Ballarat was in the training of nurses. Just before the outbreak of World War I, for example, she was giving a lecture in "home nursing". Once war broke out, she was reported to have women in training for formation of a possible Australian nurses' brigade.

Nevertheless, in April 1915 she accepted an appointment as one of the first female Medical Officers employed by the NSW Department of Public Instruction. It would mean that over the next few years, she would be responsible for basic health check-ups of many thousands of NSW school children. As an example, in one three-week period in 1916, she and one colleague would inspect between 1400 and 1500 children at a school in Lithgow. Vale would travel widely to schools throughout rural NSW, but would make occasional visits back to Victoria. "The Vale family in Ballarat are rejoicing over the temporary return to the fold of their brilliant relative, Dr. Grace Vale, who not long since received an appointment on the medical staff of the NSW Education Department," reported one newspaper in January 1919. "Dr. Vale is spending her vacation in Ballarat before commencing the new year's strenuous' programme."

Vale retired in mid-1925 and went to live with one of her sisters in the Melbourne bayside suburb of Black Rock.

== Death ==
During her retirement, Vale gave occasional talks on medical inspections in schools before her death in Black Rock on 22 December 1933. She was buried the following day at the Cheltenham Pioneer Cemetery in Charman Road. Vale never married, and is not known to have had any children.
