= Constance Stone =

Australian physician and feminist (1856–1902)

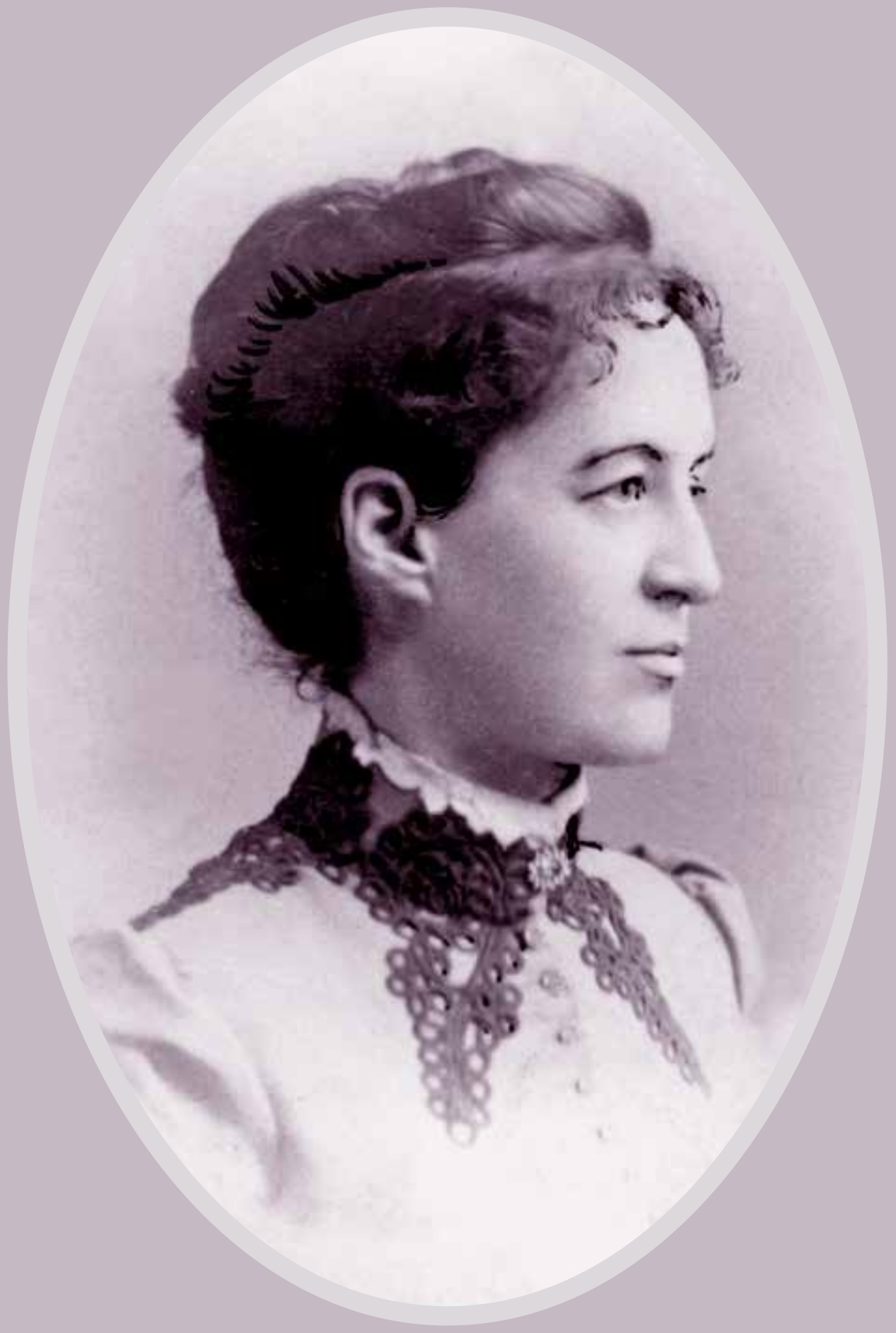
- Born: 4 December 1856; Hobart, Tasmania
- Died: 29 December 1902 (aged 46); St Kilda, Victoria, Australia
- Education: University of Trinity College
- Occupation: Physician

Emma Constance Stone (4 December 1856 – 29 December 1902) was the first woman to practice medicine in Australia. She played an important role in founding both the Queen Victoria Hospital, and the Victorian Medical Women's Society in Melbourne.

== Early life and education ==
Stone was born on 4 December 1856 in Hobart, Tasmania to William and Betsy Stone. The family moved to Melbourne in 1872. In 1882, Stone met Reverend David Egryn Jones, who had emigrated from England. Moved by the poverty his parish, Jones decided to study medicine, and Constance followed suit. She was forced to leave Australia to study medicine since the University of Melbourne would not admit women into the medicine course. She graduated from the Woman's Medical College of Pennsylvania, and was awarded her MD from the University of Trinity College, Toronto in 1888. Jones followed her to Canada to earn his MD.

== Career ==
Stone went on to London where she worked in the New Hospital for Women and qualified as a licentiate of the Worshipful Society of Apothecaries in 1889. It was her time at the New Hospital which was her inspiration to one day found a hospital that was run 'by women, for women'.

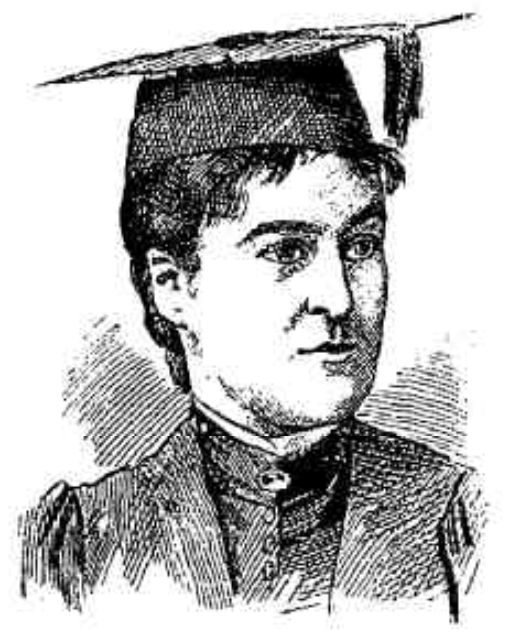
Dr_Constance_Stone,_1890

In 1890, after she returned to Australia, she became the first woman to be registered with the Medical Board of Victoria. Her sister, Grace 'Clara' Stone followed her into medicine. Clara had been allowed to study in Australia and was one of two women who graduated from the University of Melbourne in 1891. The sisters went into private practice together and both worked at the out-patients' dispensary in La Trobe Street.

In 1895, the first meeting of the Victorian Medical Women's Society convened in Constance's house, with Clara taking up the presidency. In September 1896 eleven of Melbourne's women, doctors decided to found the Queen Victoria Hospital for women. Construction of the hospital was funded by a jubilee shilling fund appeal, it officially opened in July 1899.

== Death and legacy ==
Stone married Reverend David Egryn Jones in 1893. She gave birth to her daughter, Constance Bronwen, in 1899.

In 1902, Stone fell ill with tuberculosis and died on 29 December, aged 45. Her husband Rev David Egryn Jones MD, and daughter Bronwen, who also became a doctor in London, survived her.

A lane in the Queen Victoria Village in Melbourne (known as QV), is named after Stone. She was posthumously inducted onto the Victorian Honour Roll of Women in 2001.
