= Margareta Webber =

Australian Bookseller (1891–1983)

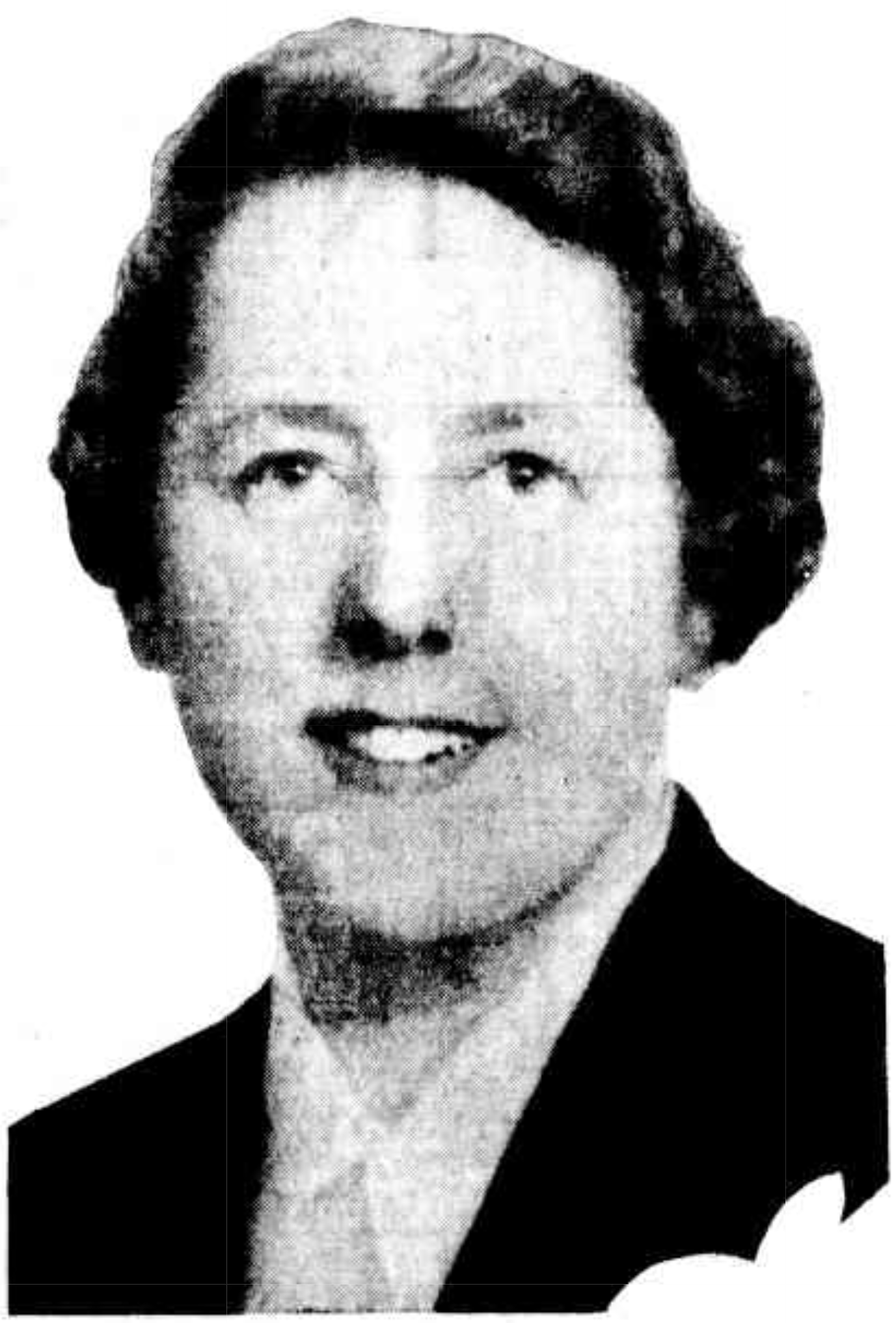
- Webber c.1937
- Born: Margareta Louise Pitcairn Webber; 17 September 1891; Prahran, Melbourne, Australia
- Died: 6 May 1983 (aged 91); Hawthorn, Melbourne, Australia
- Occupation: Bookseller
- Known for: The Bookshop of Margareta Webber; The Soroptimist International Club of Victoria
- Partner: Jean Littlejohn

Margareta Louise Pitcairn Webber (17 September 1891 – 6 May 1983) was a bookseller from Melbourne, Australia, who for nearly 40 years ran a bookstore in McEwan house, called The Bookshop of Margareta Webber. She was a respected business person, and her bookshop was frequented by notable Melbourne figures.

== Early life ==
Webber was the daughter of Margaret Pitcairn, née Fairbairn, and Edwin George Webber. As a child, she would write her own stories, and bind them into books. She was educated at a private girls school in Armadale, Victoria, and some of her writings were accepted in publications. She joined an amateur singing troupe, called "the Gipsy Rovers", when she was in her early 20s. The Troupe consisted of ten women, and was active during World War I, giving performances aid of the war effort.

== Career ==
Webber started her career in 1918, at Parr's Bookshop, under the tutelage of Edgar A. Parr. She started her own bookshop in 1931, at McEwan House, on Collins Street in Melbourne, during the financial crisis of the great depression, but managed to build the business during and by 1937, she had expanded the business, doubling the footprint, and was reported to be a leading bookshop in Melbourne. She focussed on building an atmosphere of comfort in her bookshop with furnishings, pottery, prints, colourful rugs, and flowers, and she dispensed coffee and sherry. She made an effort to know customers, and provide them with individualised service according to their interests, and expert advice. As well as having general collections, Webber stocked books from small and large publishers, on a wide variety of topics, such as poetry, philosophy, psychology, cooking and gardening. She was associated with the Verse Speaking Association. She also had an interest in education, particularly in early childhood education, providing literature for the kindergarten movement. The bookshop primarily dealt with new books, however, Webber would on request assist with finding and importing rare and valuable books.

In 1936, she was the subject of a feature article in The Modern Store, and in 1938, this article was reprinted in the London Publishers' Circular. The publisher Jonathan Cape stated that the Margareta Webber Bookshop, which he had visited in 1935, was the best ordered and most attractive shop he had seen.

Webber hired only women, believing they made the best booksellers. However, after she sold the business, Bill Henson worked at the store during his period as a student until its closure in 1980.

Notable customers of the bookshop were George Bell, Arnold Shore, Vance and Nettie Palmer, Sydney Ure Smith, Mary Grant Bruce, Barry Jones and Manning Clark. Webber sold the business in 1973.

=== The Soroptimist International Club of Victoria ===
With Jean Littlejohn as the founding president, Webber was a founding member of The Soroptimist International Club of Victoria.

== Personal life and death ==
Webber lived with her companion Jean Littlejohn for more than 50 years. They met in 1928 when a doctor referred Webber to Littlejohn who was an ENT surgeon. The referring doctor forewarned Littlejohn that Webber was a busy person who should not be kept waiting. Littlejohn said of that first meeting with Webber "She didn't sit down in the waiting room; she was sort of pacing up and down. She looked marvellous in a John Heath hat made of felt with a band trimmed with little pheasant feathers." before adding "She had a shocking throat...". Webber and Littlejohn lived for some time in South Yarra, and their house had a substantial wine cellar. They frequently dined at Maxim's.

For several years before her death, Webber resided at a nursing home in Hawthorn. She died on 6 May 1983, aged 91, and a memorial for her life with books was held at the Toorak Uniting Church on 12 May 1983.
