= Julian Smith (photographer) =

Australian surgeon and portrait photographer (1873–1947)

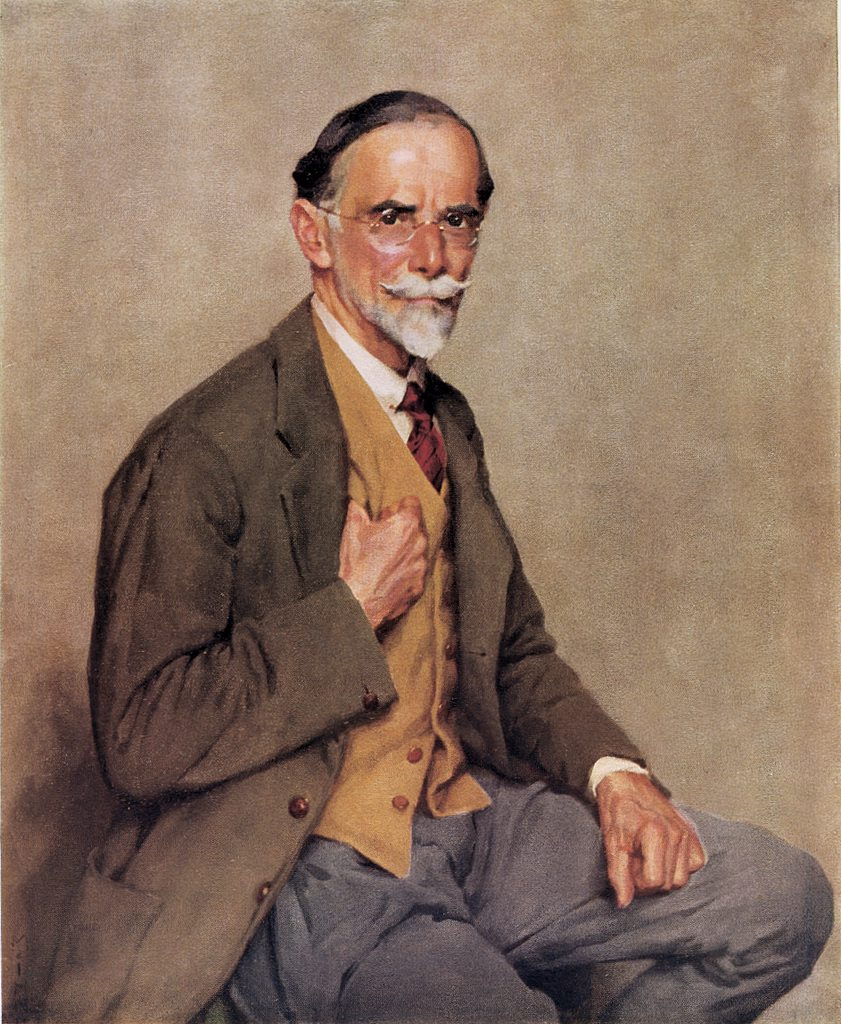
- Smith in 1936 by W. B. McInnes
- Born: Julian Augustus Romaine Smith; 5 December 1873; Melbourne, Australia
- Died: 13 November 1947 (aged 73); Melbourne
- Education: University of Adelaide, University of Melbourne
- Occupations: Surgeon, photographer
- Movement: Pictorialism
- Spouse: Edith Reynolds (m. 1901)

Signature
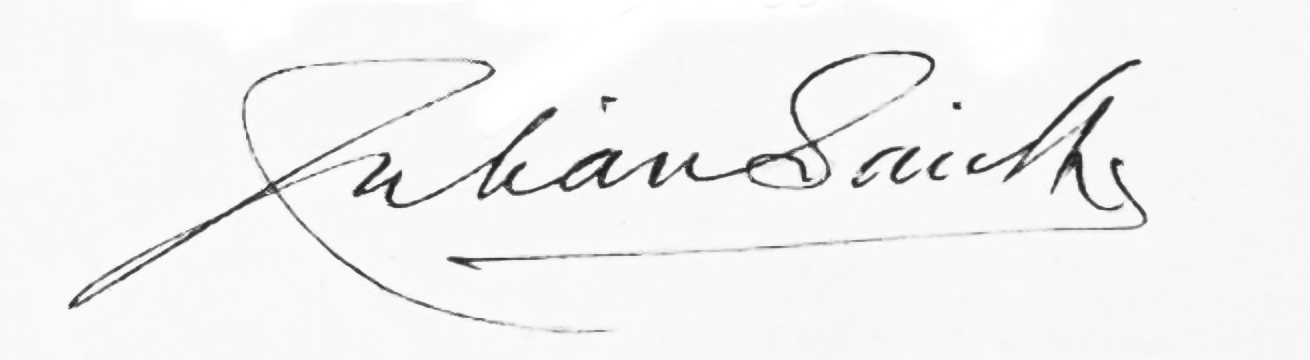

Julian Augustus Romaine Smith F.R.P.S. (1873–1947) was a British-Australian surgeon and photographer.

== Early life and education ==
Julian Smith was born on 5 December 1873 in Camberwell, Surrey, England, the son of Rose Amelia Smith (née Pooley) and Captain Julian Augustus James Smith, master mariner. His family migrated to live in Halifax Street Adelaide, Australia three years later.

He was educated at Prince Alfred College and the University of Adelaide where he obtained a Bachelor of Science in 1892 and on graduation taught at his former school, returning to University to study medicine from 1893. He rowed in the winning Adelaide university crew in 1895–1896. However a mass resignation of all honorary physicians and surgeons due to disagreement between the board of management of the Royal Adelaide Hospital and the government ceased clinical instruction, so that in 1897 Smith and seventeen other students had to move to Melbourne to complete their studies, and there he rowed in and coached the Ormond College rowing crew 1897–1898.

Smith graduated with M.B. in 1898 and B.S. in 1899 at the top of his year, with exhibitions, and prizes including that offered by the estate of Dr. James George Beaney for bacteriology in surgery. He was made senior resident medical officer at the Royal Melbourne Hospital, and was interim medical superintendent. He obtained his M.D. (Melbourne) in 1901 followed by the degree of Master of Surgery (Adelaide) in 1908, examined by Professor Welsh, of the University of Sydney, and Dr. Reissmann and Professor of operative surgery Archibald Watson of Adelaide University. His thesis was "The Treatment Surgical Tuberculosis" from his research on the treatment of tuberculosis by vaccines, in the opsonic method developed by Sir Almroth Wright, with whom Smith worked when in London.

== Surgeon ==
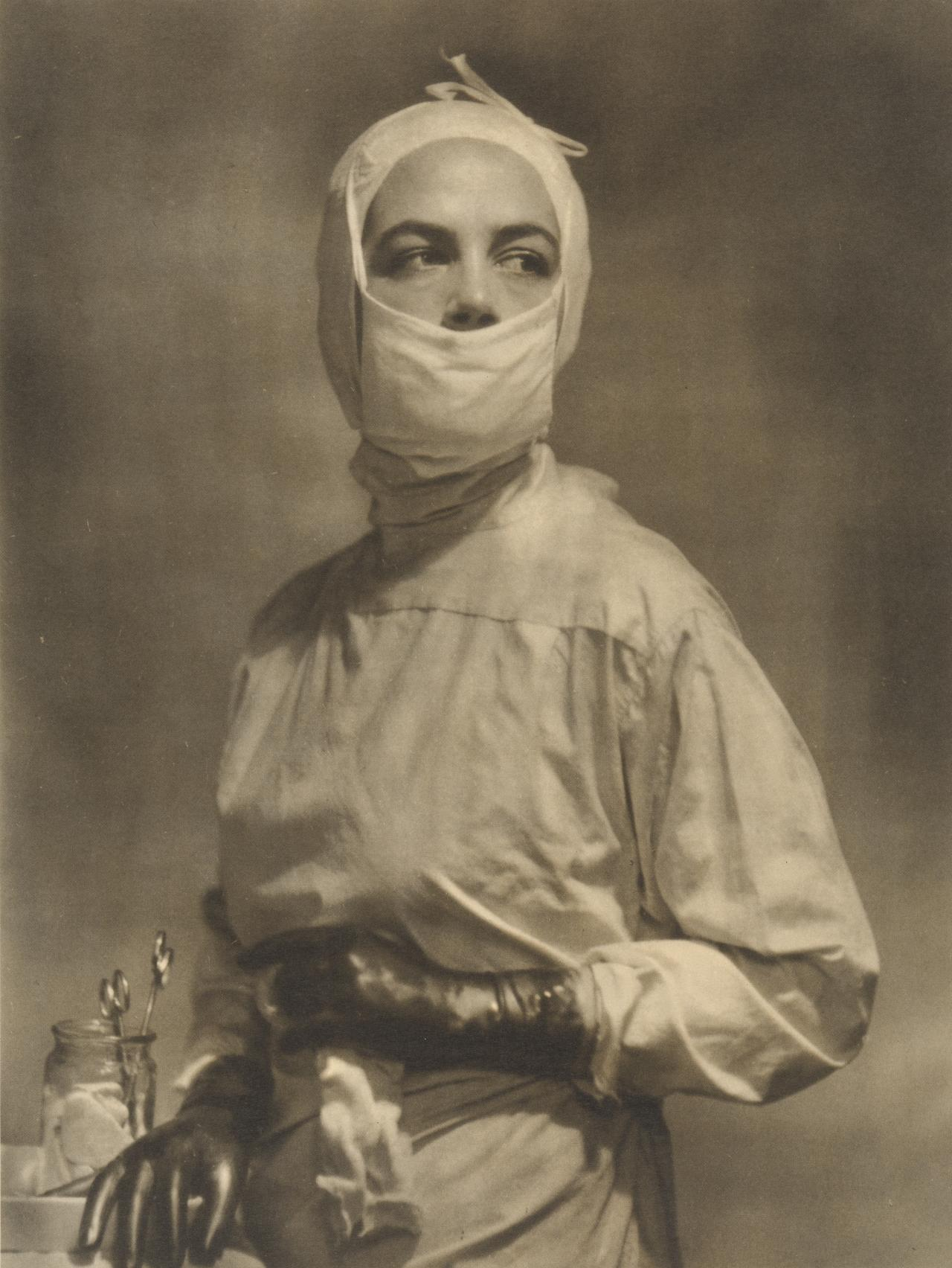
Julian Smith (1930s): The theatre sister

In April 1901 Smith began general practice at Morwell, Gippsland where he was appointed Health Officer, with an early task of dealing with an outbreak of diphtheria. He and Edith Mary Reynolds were married by Archdeacon Langley at St Paul's Cathedral, Melbourne, on 24 September that year.

While the couple lived in Gippsland, their first son was born on 21 January 1903. In January 1906, to the regret of friends and patients, though he returned to operate on patients there until 1912, he left Morwell to practice as a junior partner in the Simpson Street, East Melbourne, surgery of Frederic Bird. Considerable attention from the press was given in 1912 to Smith's depositions supporting claimants suing the Railway Commissioners after an accident at Yea, during which Smith's and other medico's fees were questioned. Smith was called upon in subsequent years to give medical evidence in court in the cases of divorce, inheritance disputes, murder and assault, accidents and suicides.

He was appointed honorary demonstrator of surgery at the University of Melbourne in mid-1907, and also elected honorary surgeon at St Vincent's Hospital, Melbourne, and influenced its recognition as a clinical school of the university during 1909. He successfully established rooms at 59 Collins Street (later at 2 Collins Street) and a private hospital. One of his patients was Tasmanian Senator Rudolph Ready, and in 1918 Albury Anzac veteran and grazier George Robert Jackson bequeathed him £3000. The couple, then residing in Powlett St. South Yarra, purchased a holiday home, part of Glen Shian on Ballar Creek in Mt Eliza, in 1921. In 1927 he became a Foundation Fellow of the Royal Australasian College of Surgeons. Presenting Victoria at the International Cancer Conference while on holiday in London in 1928 Smith predicted that a cure for cancer was imminent, and later speaking in Australia on the use of radium in its treatment, he used Dr. Ronald G. Canti's recent film to discuss its effect on cancer cells, comparing the spread of the latter to 'Bolsheviks.' He retired from St Vincents and was appointed consulting surgeon in 1929. His long-distance phone consultation with Harley Street specialist in London Dr. Moreland McCrea concerning a life-and-death case was healed as 'epoch-making' and attracted the attention of King George V.

In 1936 he retired from practice, but in World War II returned to surgery. From his interests in haematology, he made the prototypes of a pump for transfusing blood direct from donor to patient, and devised a machine for sharpening and polishing transfusion and other needles, both inventions advanced surgical treatment. As a member of the British Medical Association in 1901–36 he promulgated views on surgery, particularly on diseases of the urinary tract, at branch meetings and his research in urology and transfusion was published in the Medical Journal of Australia.

== Photographer ==
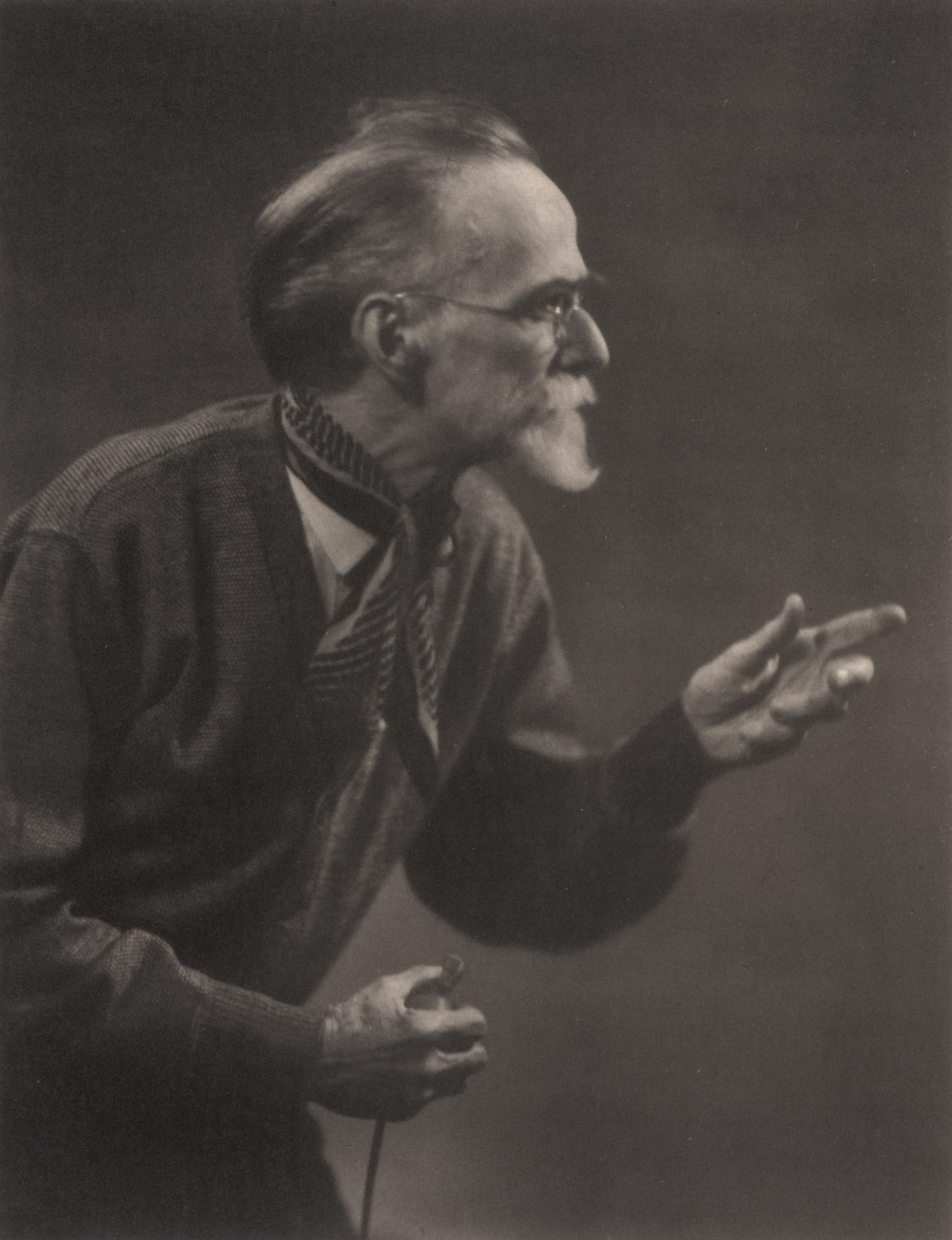
Julian Smith (1930s): Self-portrait

Recognised as a distinguished surgeon in Melbourne, Smith succeeded in a parallel career as an eminent photographer when, having taken up the medium in the 1920s and exhibiting with the Melbourne Camera Club, he devoted time to it in his late forties. He specialised in portraiture which he exhibited locally and internationally. He helped establish the Victorian Photographic Salon as a founding member in 1929 and was its president and frequently judged its exhibitions, including its International Salon. In 1946 the Australasian Photo-Review paid tribute to him;

"It is safe to assume that every Australian photographer is familiar with the work of Dr. Julian Smith His artistic genius, his technical skill and his versatility are famous, not only in Australia, but throughout the whole world of pictorial photography."

He was elected an honorary fellow of the Royal Photographic Society. In his early history of the medium in Australia Jack Cato asserted that Smith "had no superior in any part of the world". His portraits are in an outmoded Pictorialist style in a period of the emerging New Photography, artistically lit with orchestrated, sometimes melodramatic, poses, and printed with radical overexposure in pyrocatechin developer and bleaching-back with ferricyanide. In his more contrived, but popular, 'character study' tableaux the subject may be costumed as a protagonist from Dickens, Shakespeare, or from nursery rhymes.

Smith's character studies appeared with an article explaining his technique in Contemporary Photography,

== Reception ==
Smith's work was widely admired in the 1920s and 1930s. Reviewing his contributions to an exhibition of the Melbourne Camera Club in July 1926, The Age newspaper wrote; "Dr. Julian Smith's work in the field of portraiture is quite distinguished by its refinement," and in a review of a May 1930 show in which his work featured, the newspaper noted that "the matter of tone (spcaking from the painter's point of view) has received close attention," especially in "such fine studies as The Prince, East Is East, and the head study, August Knapps. An outdoor study of choice quality is The Little Dock.

Smith's work served as material for discussion during the 1930s of the artistic worth of photography. Painter Arthur Streeton, reviewing the 1931 International exhibition of the Victorian Salon of Photograph at the Athenaeum Gallery, after a preamble supporting the idea that photography is art, chooses for his first comments Smith's The Painter, La Rixe ('The Brawl') and Flight. Of the same show watercolourist Blamire Young remarks on Smith's determination "to extract from his models the very utmost they can offer in the way of character and presentment. His lighting effects are still further systematised, and his control of his medium appears to be on the verge of the absolute," hailing his portrait of John Shirlow "as good as anything Dr. Smith has done. It shows the fine feeling for type which guides him in the selection of his sitters, and which so frequently places his work in the front rank," though, at odds with Streeton he condemns the "crudity of ... design" in La Rixe which "reminds of the gulf which still separates photography from fine art."

By 1933 the Australasian Photo-Review was more specific about the effect of his portraits and 'character studies';

Dr Julian Smith is represented by four of his capable portrait studies; perhaps character studies would be a more apt description. He uses emphasis of lighting in a dramatic way, and thus heightens the drama already suggested by the disposition of the model.

He achieved international recognition; the American Annual of Photography featured his "My Aims and Methods" in 1941. Unafraid to express his forthright opinions, in 1935 after the 3rd Canadian salon, he wrote to Eric Brown, director of the National Gallery of Canada, to complain "about the selection methods, the acceptance of photogravure as a photographic process, the recognition or not of certain technical processes" and the definition of "experimental photography."

== Portraitist ==
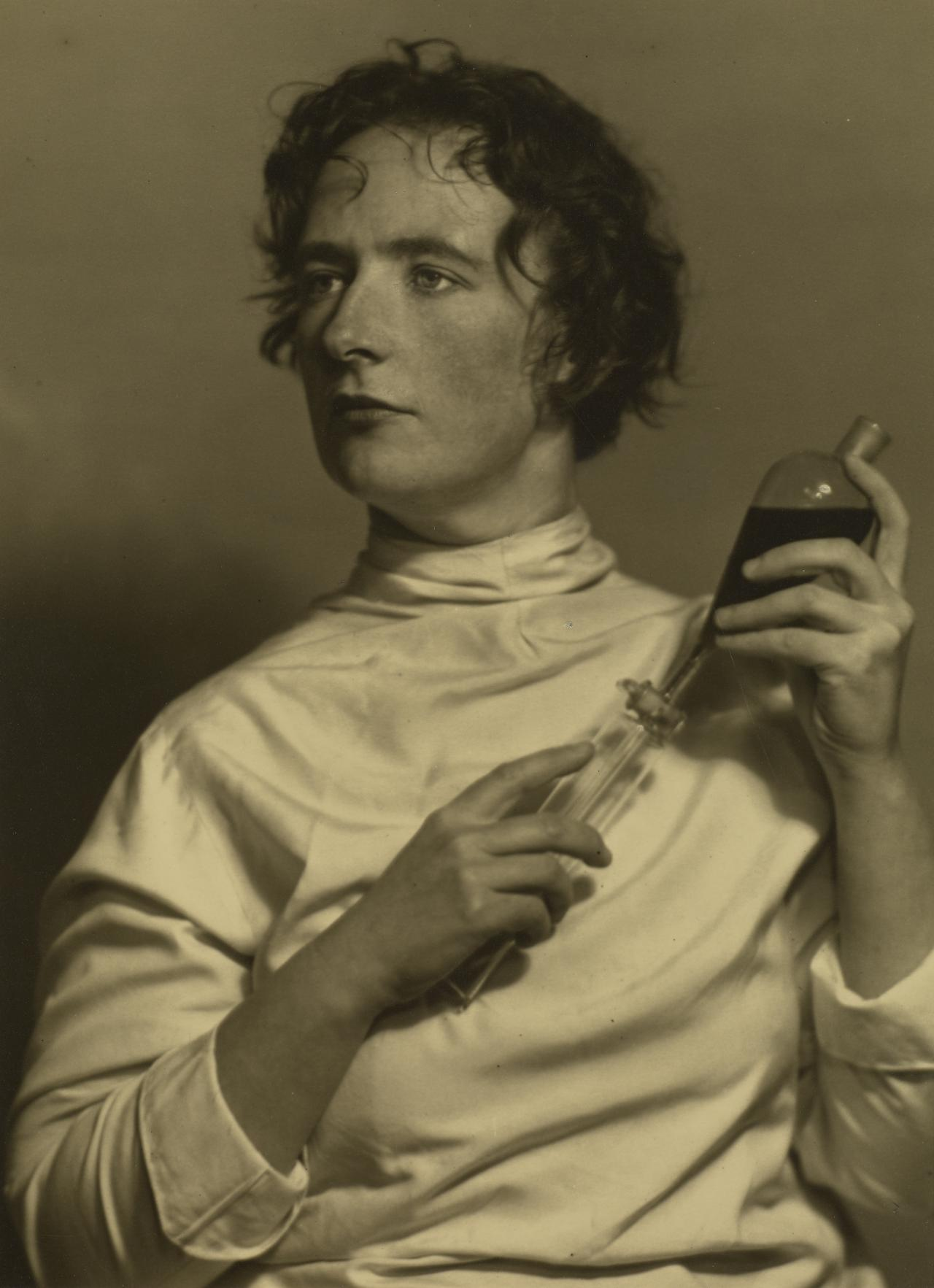
Julian Smith (1930s): Portrait of Marjorie Bick MSc

Smith was a mentor to portraitist and fashion photographer Athol Shmith, whose studio was also in the 'Paris End' of Collins Street, Melbourne.

Julian Smith's subjects, his fellow medicos include biochemist Marjorie Bick, virologist Frank Macfarlane Burnet, pathologist Howard Florey, Royal Physician Thomas Horder, anatomist Professor Frederic Wood Jones, Dr. John Dale, Dr. Thomas Wood; and other celebrated Australians aviator Charles Kingsford Smith, Colonel Walter E. Summons, Brigadier Neil Hamilton Fairley; writer Robert Henderson Croll, and poets John Shaw Neilson, and Bernard O'Dowd; dancer Sono Osato; actors Gregan McMahon, and Frank Talbot; artists John Shirlow, Murray Griffin, William Dargie, and Lionel Lindsay, photographers Harold Cazneaux (who also photographed Smith), Dudley Johnston, E. B. Hawkes, Monte Luke James E. Paton and F. C. Tilney; politician Alfred Stephen; Gwendolyn M. Bernard; businessman Sir Robert Gibson; Beatrice Baillieu, and community worker and writer Paquita Mawson.

== Legacy ==
Smith died of cancer on 13 November 1947 at his East Melbourne home aged 74, and was cremated at Springvale with Anglican rites. His wife Edith, sons Dr Orme Smith, Dr Geoffrey Smith (dentist), Dr Hubert Smith, and daughter Roma (Mrs Page) survived him.

Smith was a pigeon breeder and valued it as a hobby and for its commercial possibilities, proclaiming that "the squab is highly nutritious and in all diseases which caused a loss of tissue there was nothing in the albuminous type of meat to be compared with the flesh of the pigeon. He was also known for dancing to relax between operations in the surgery; writer Joan Lindsay remembered that "trifling eccentricities ... gave Dr Julian his unique flavour. Behind the rather petulant façade he was a good, clever and kindly man, mourned by thousands of friends and patients when he died."

In 1943 Smith saw and was impressed by the drawings of a young man Russell Drysdale who was in hospital in Melbourne for an operation on his left eye, and he introduced him to Daryl Lindsay, through whom Drysdale met George Bell of the Contemporary Art Society which promoted modernist European styles, and he encouraged Drysdale to consider becoming a professional artist.

W. B. McInnes's portrait of Dr Julian Smith won the Archibald in 1936. Posthumously, Kodak published a portfolio of Smith's portraits, Fifty Masterpieces of Photography for which Russell Grimwade wrote the introduction.

== Exhibitions ==
=== Group ===
- 1926, July: Melbourne Camera Club, Kodak Salon, 161 Swanston Street, Melbourne
- 1930, May: Everymans Library, Collins Street, Melbourne
- 1930, July: Victorian Salon of Photography exhibition, Fine Art Society, 100 Exhibition St., Melbourne
- 1931, 1–12 September: International exhibition of the Victorian Salon of Photograph, Athenaeum Gallery
- 1939, 7–19 August: international camera pictures. Opened by Harold B. Herbert Athenaeum Gallery, 188 Collins Street, Melbourne

=== Posthumous ===
- 1948, 5–23 April: The Dr. Julian Smith Memorial Collection, Kodak Salon Galleries, 386 George Street, Sydney
- 1958, September to November: The Memorial Exhibition of Character Portrait Studies by the late Dr Julian Smith, The Kodak Galleries, Sep – Nov 1958

== Collections ==
- National Portrait Gallery
- National Library of Australia
- State Library of Victoria
- National Gallery of Victoria
- Art Gallery of New South Wales
- Adelaide University Research and Scholarship Collection

== Gallery ==
Photographs by Julian Smith

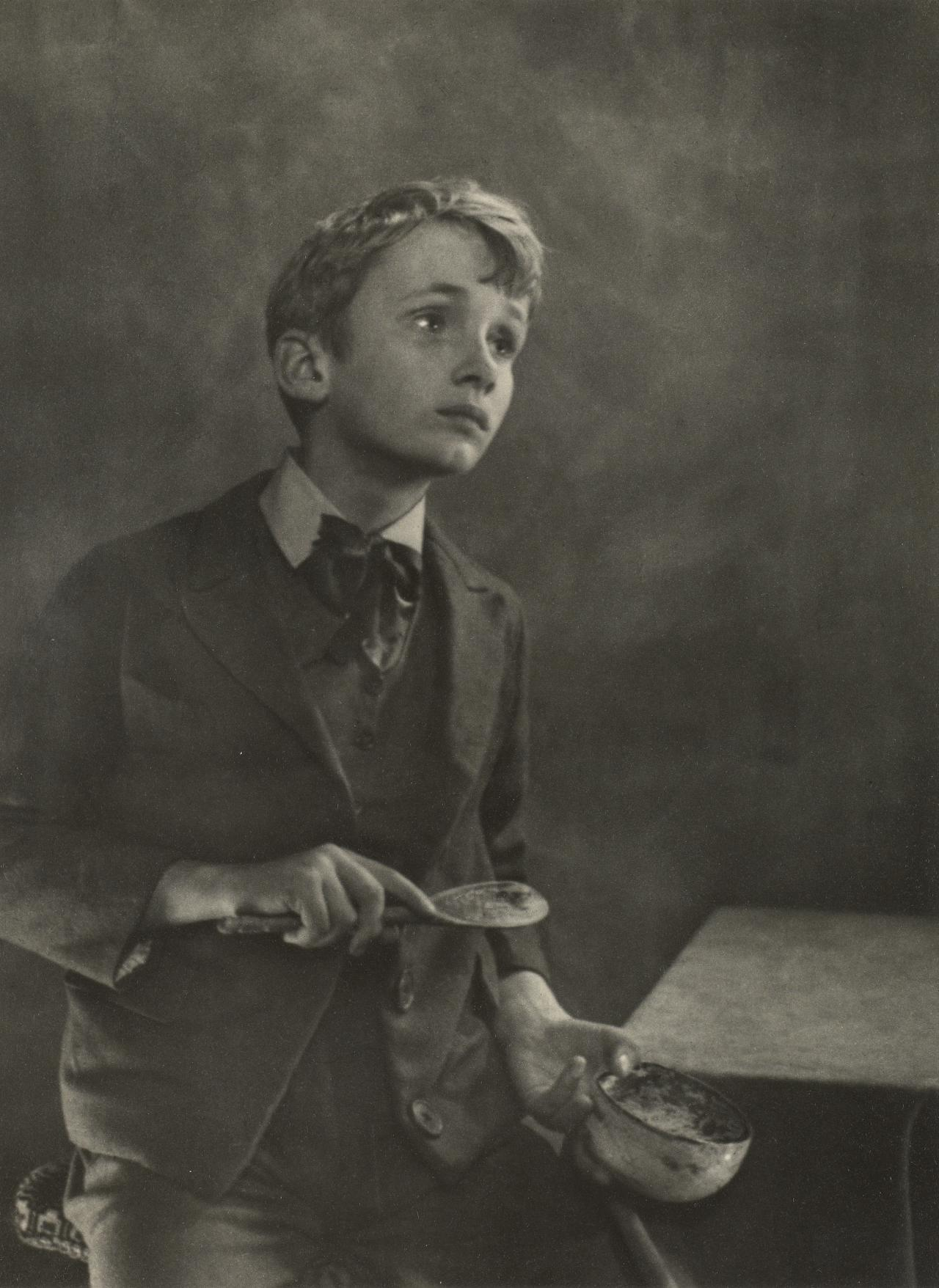

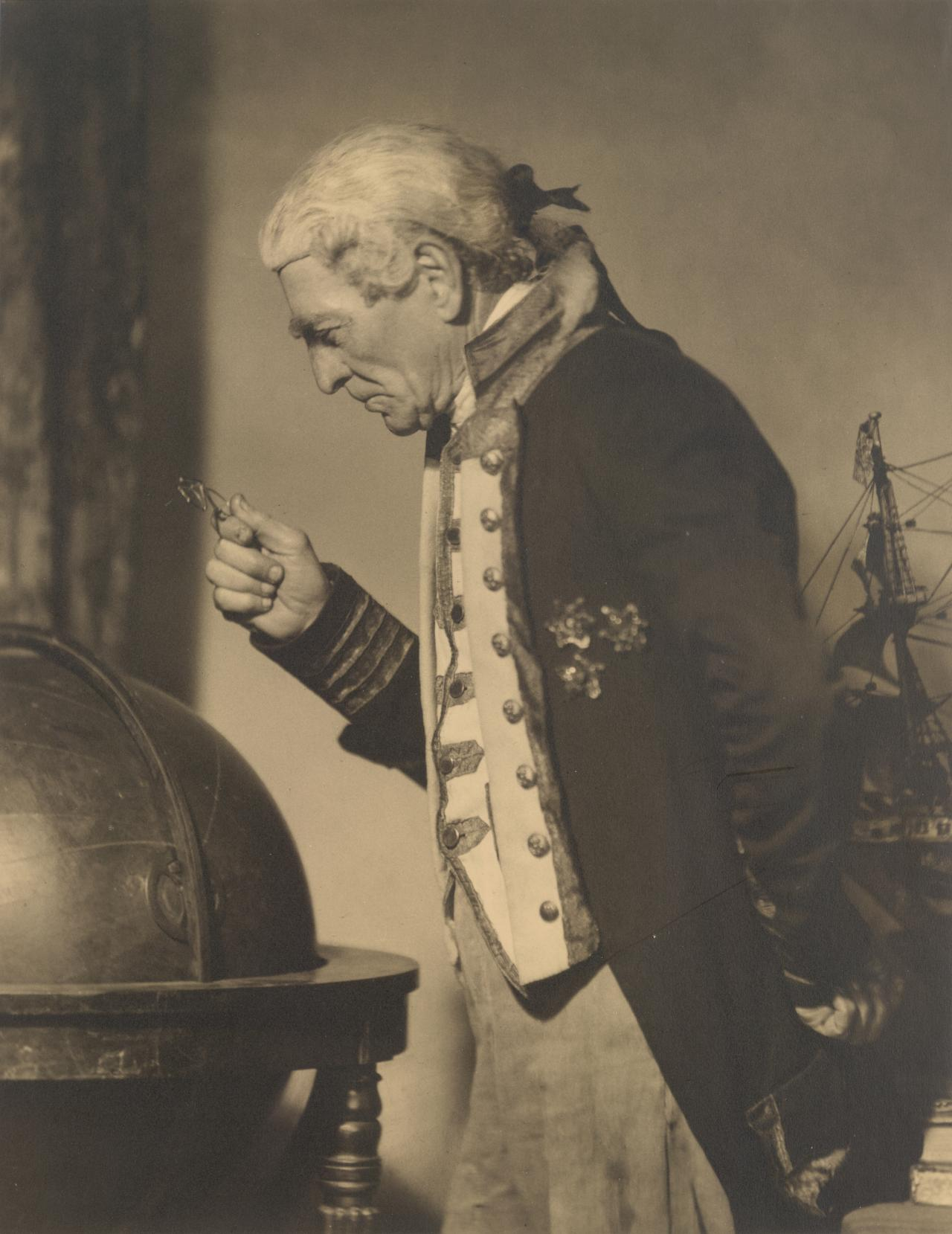

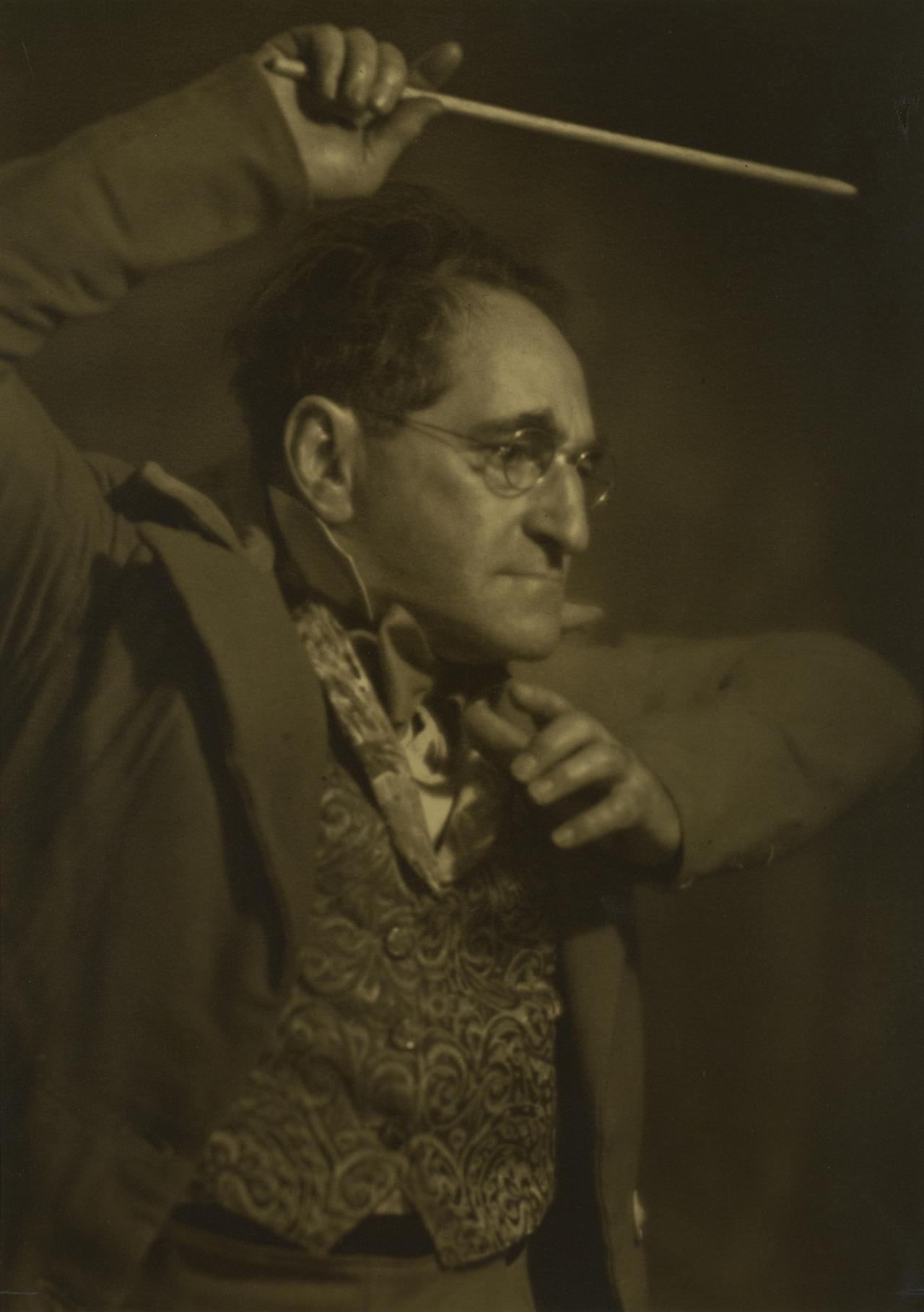

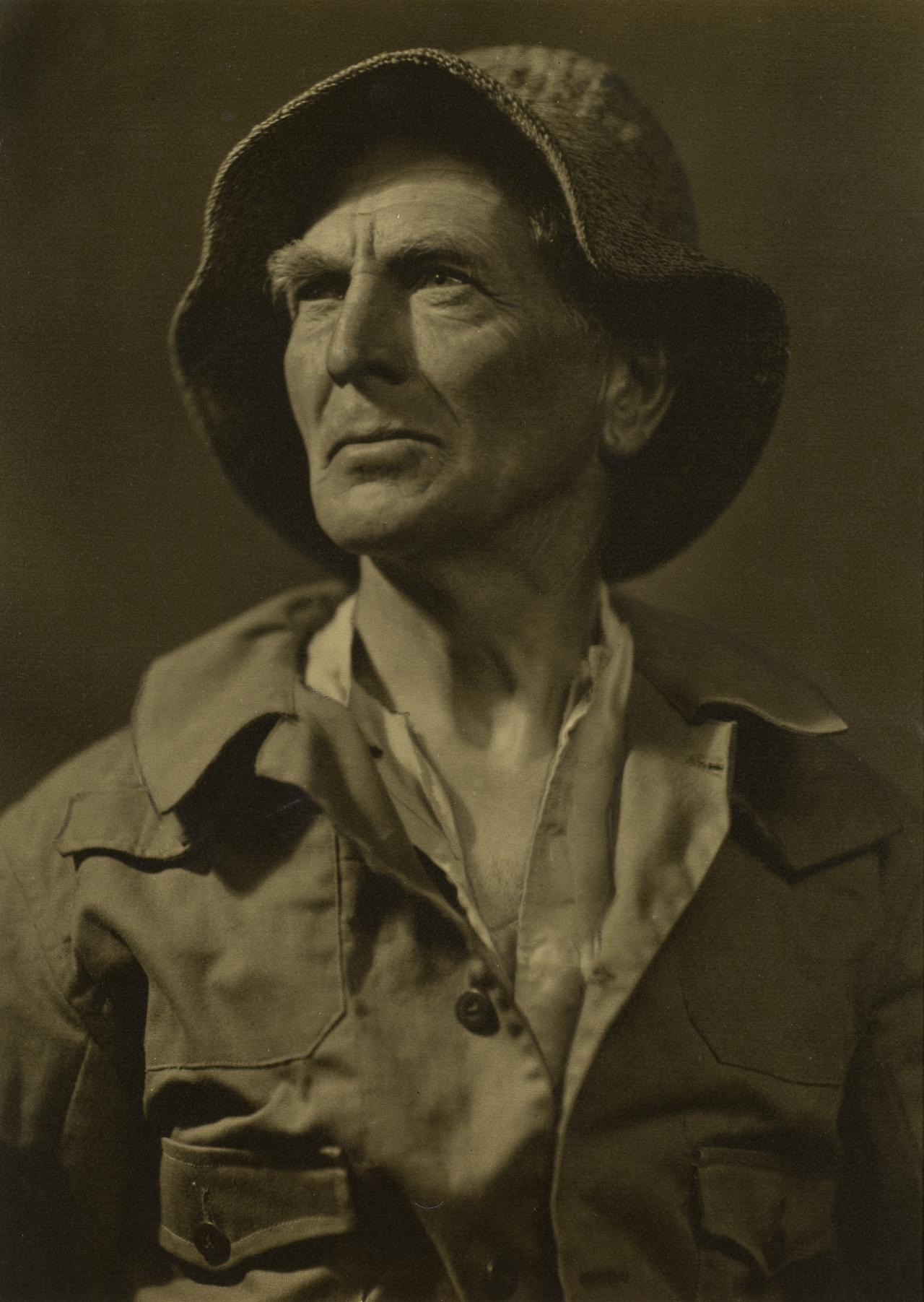

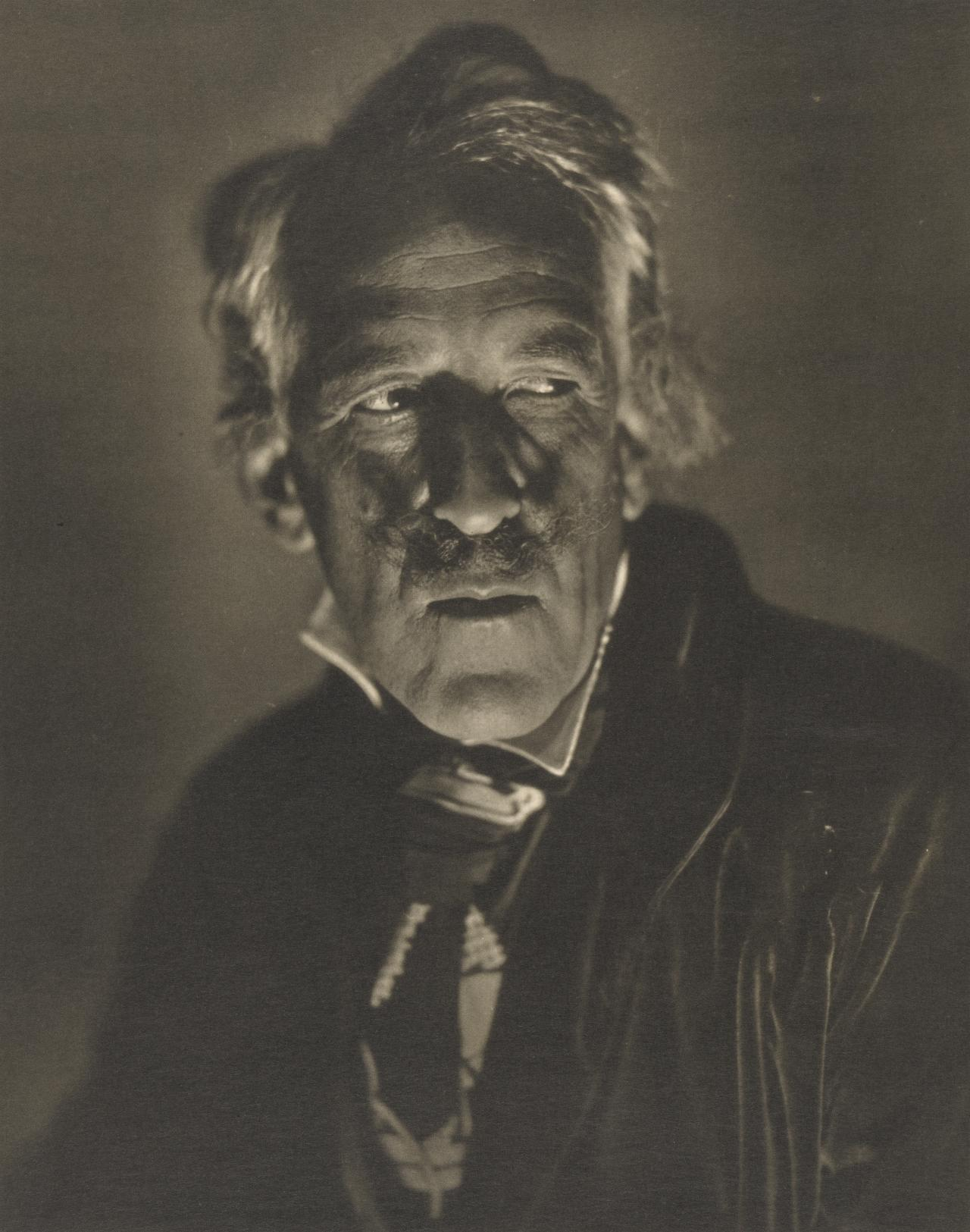

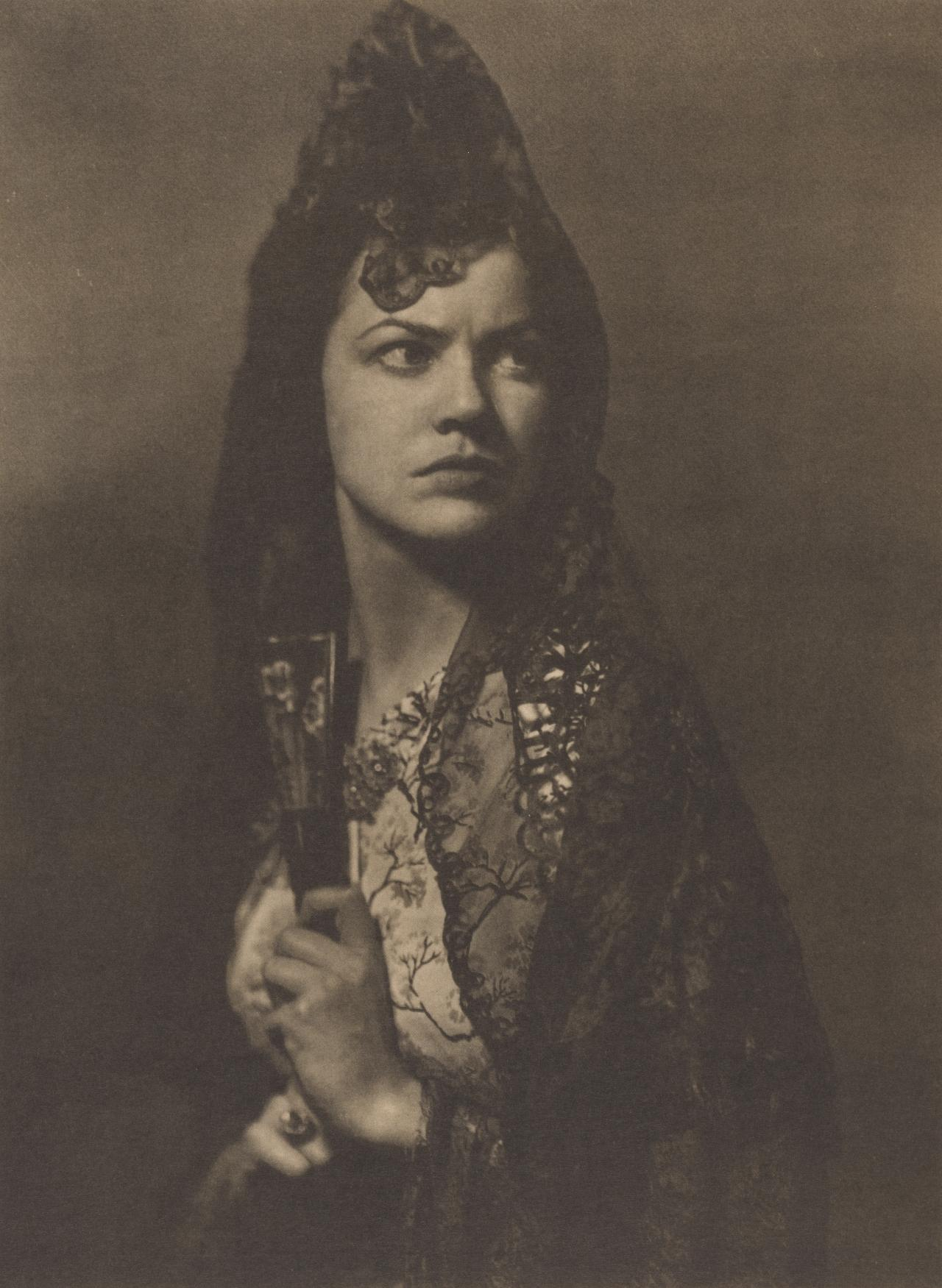

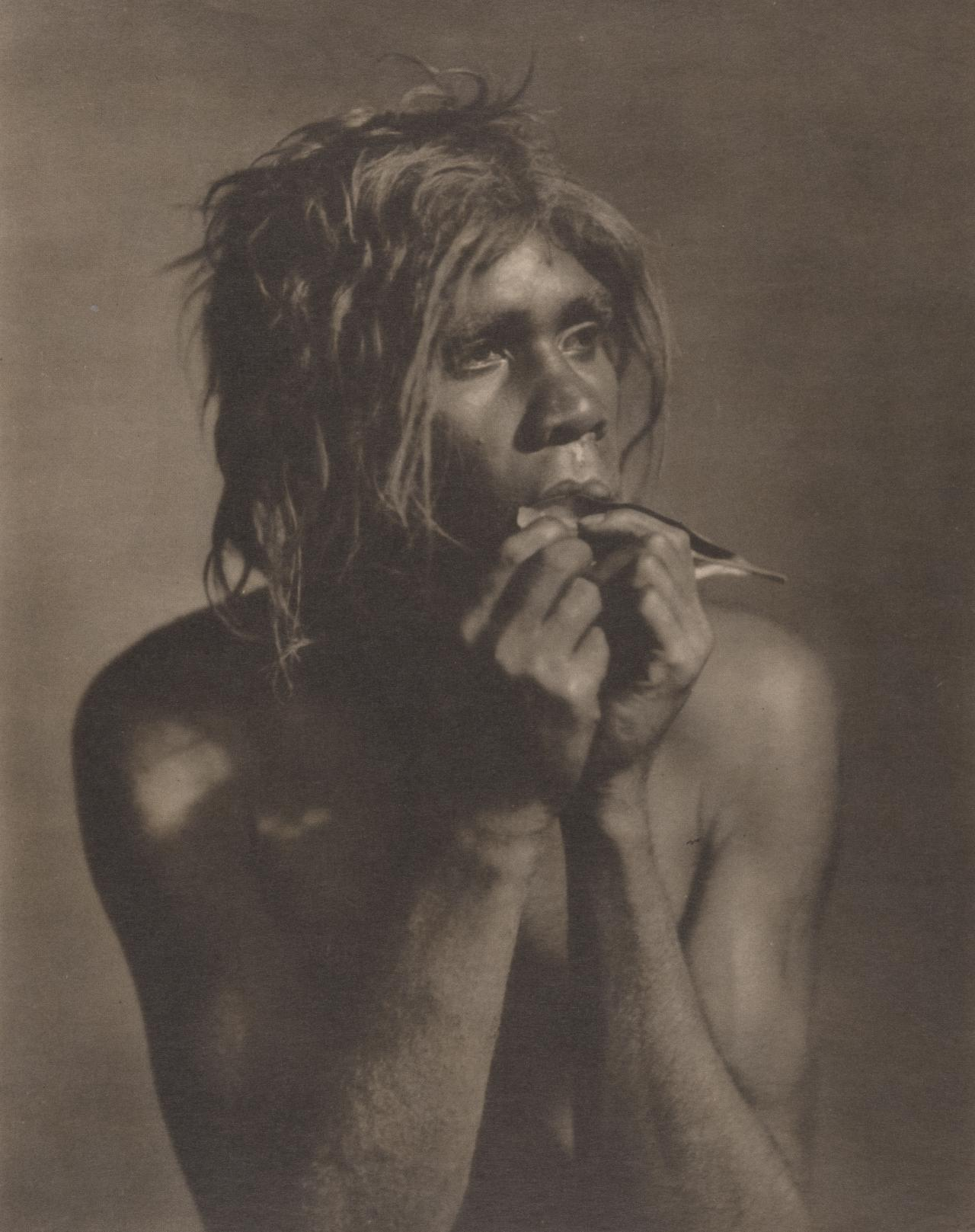

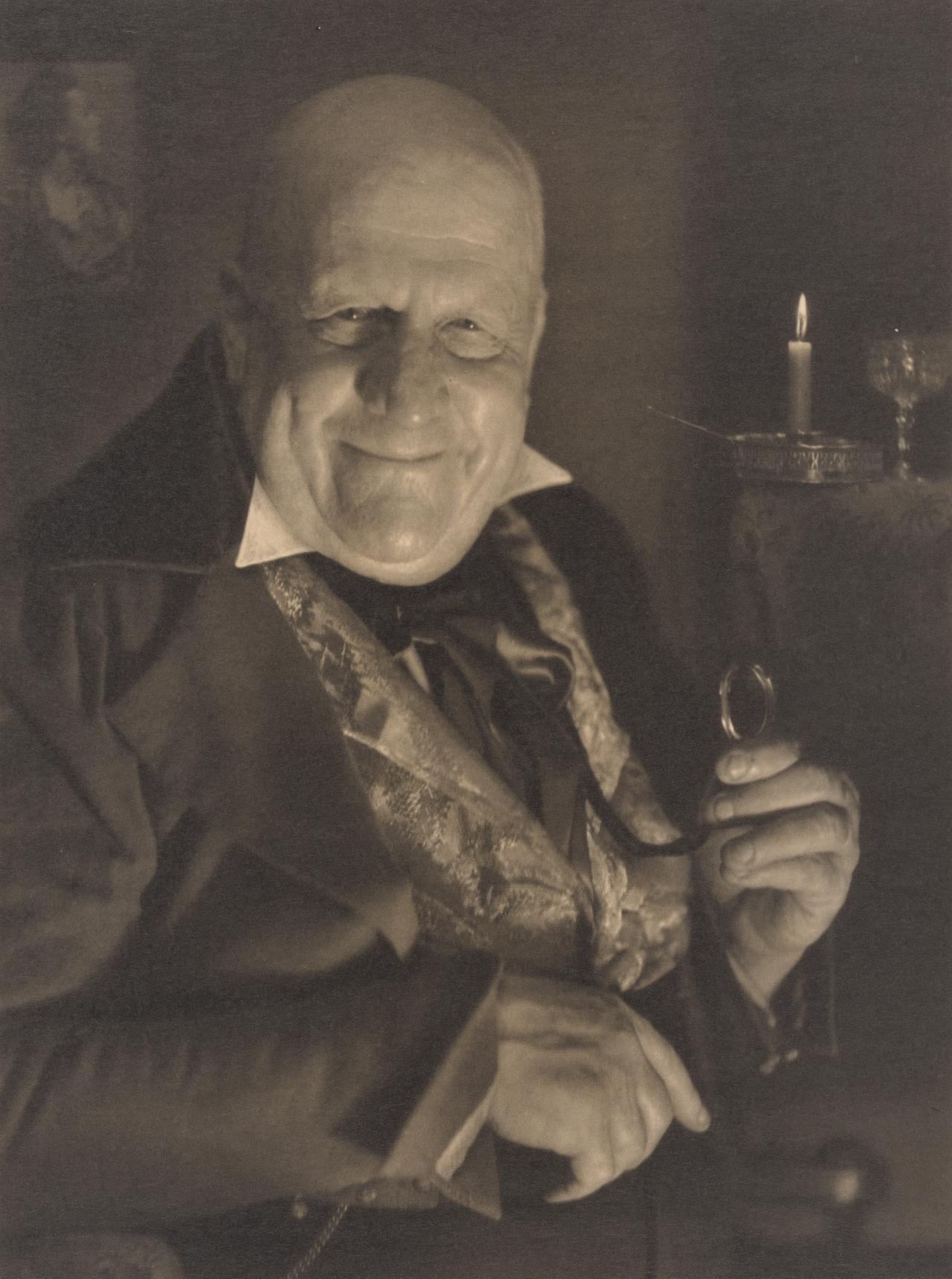

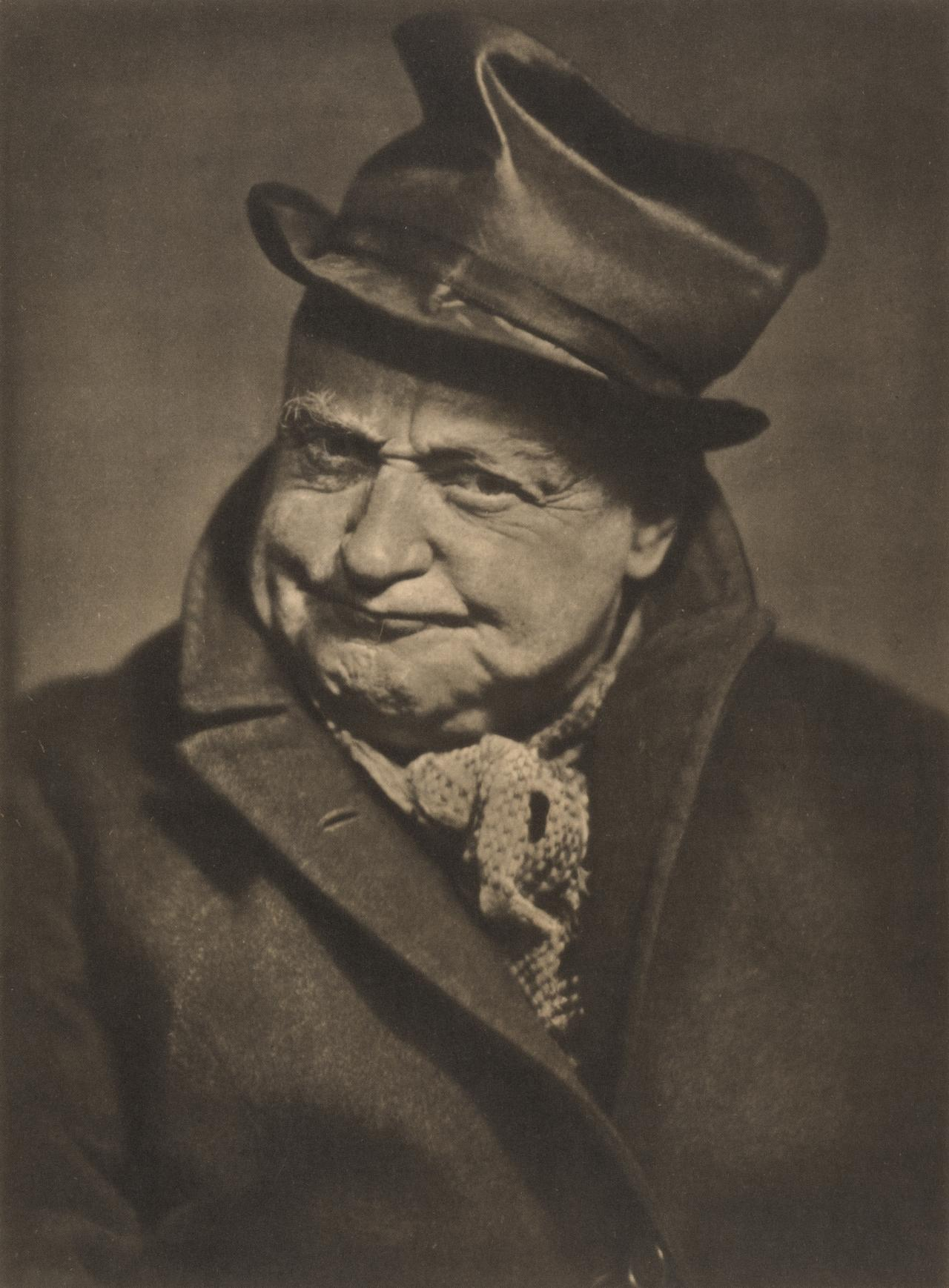

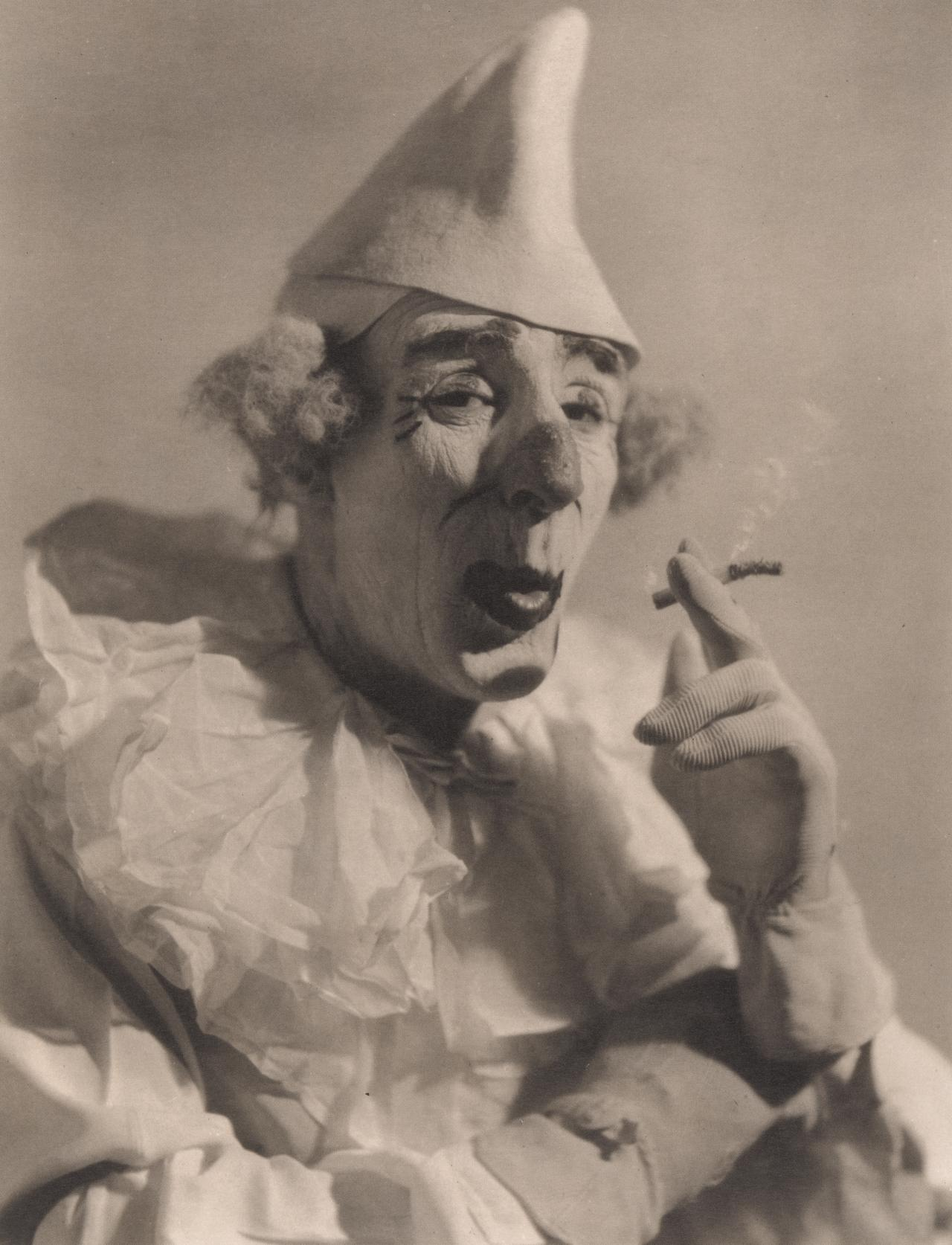

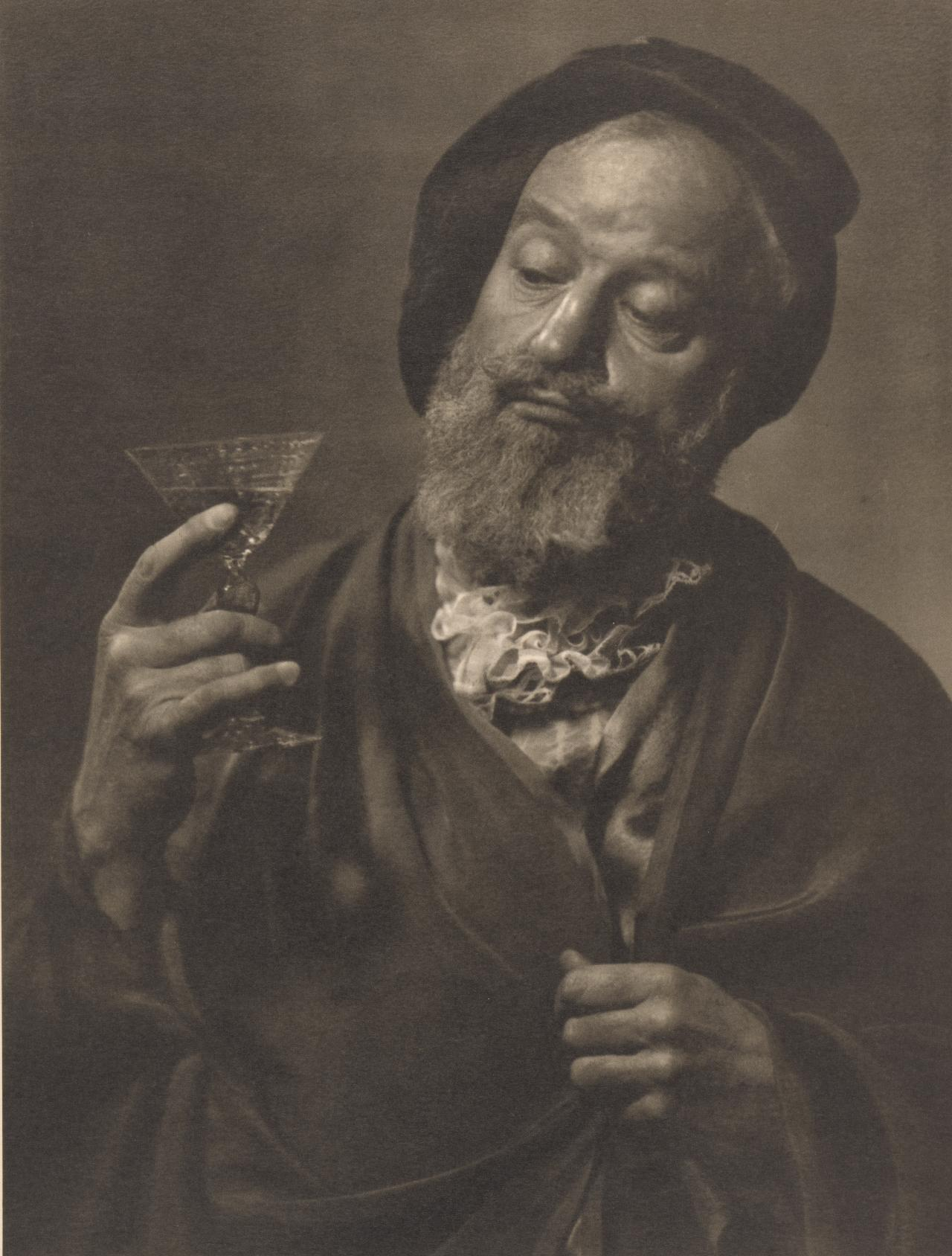

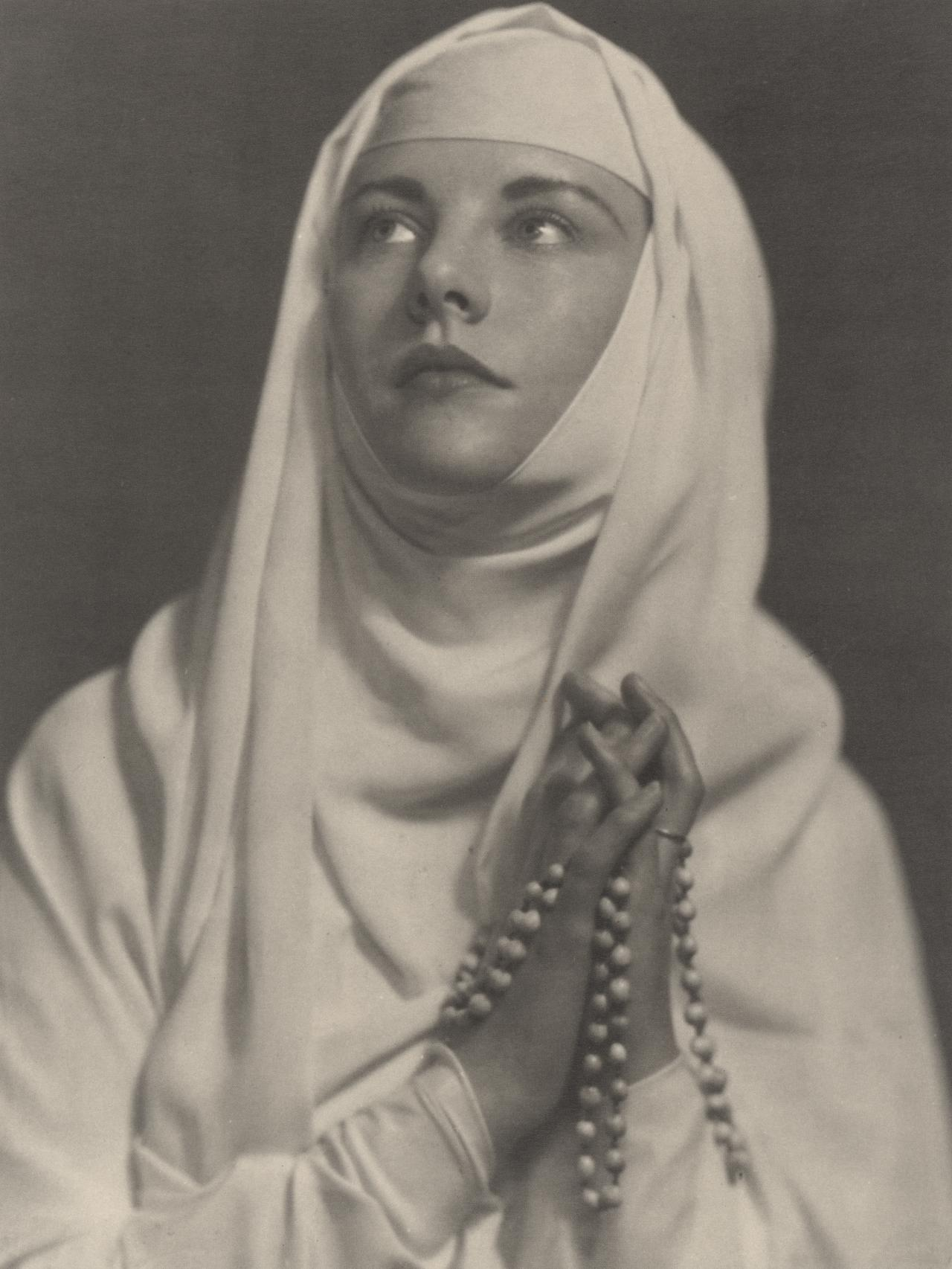

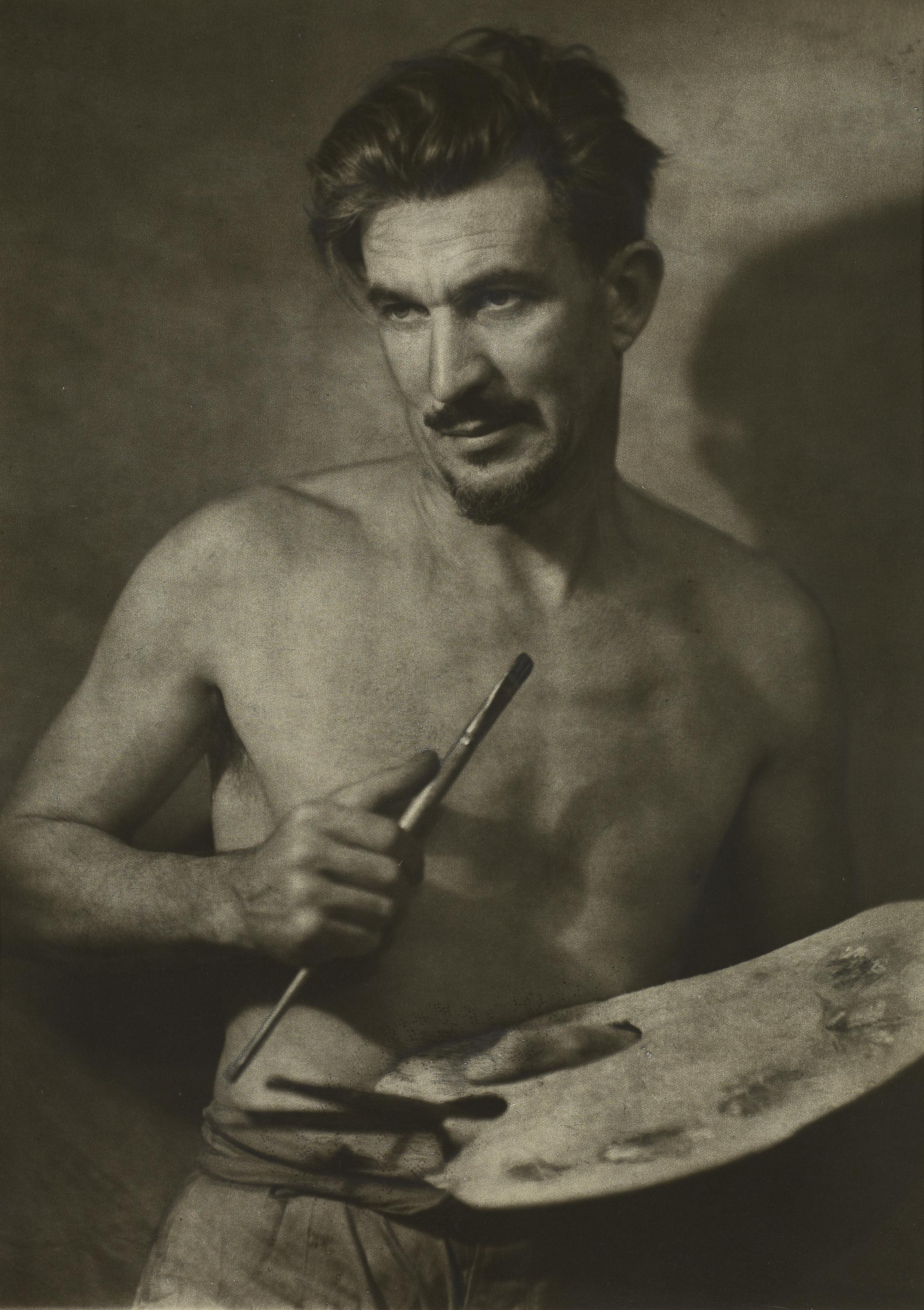
