= Kate Isabel Campbell =

Australian physician and paediatrician (1899 – 1986)

Dame Kate Isabel Campbell DBE CBE FRCOG
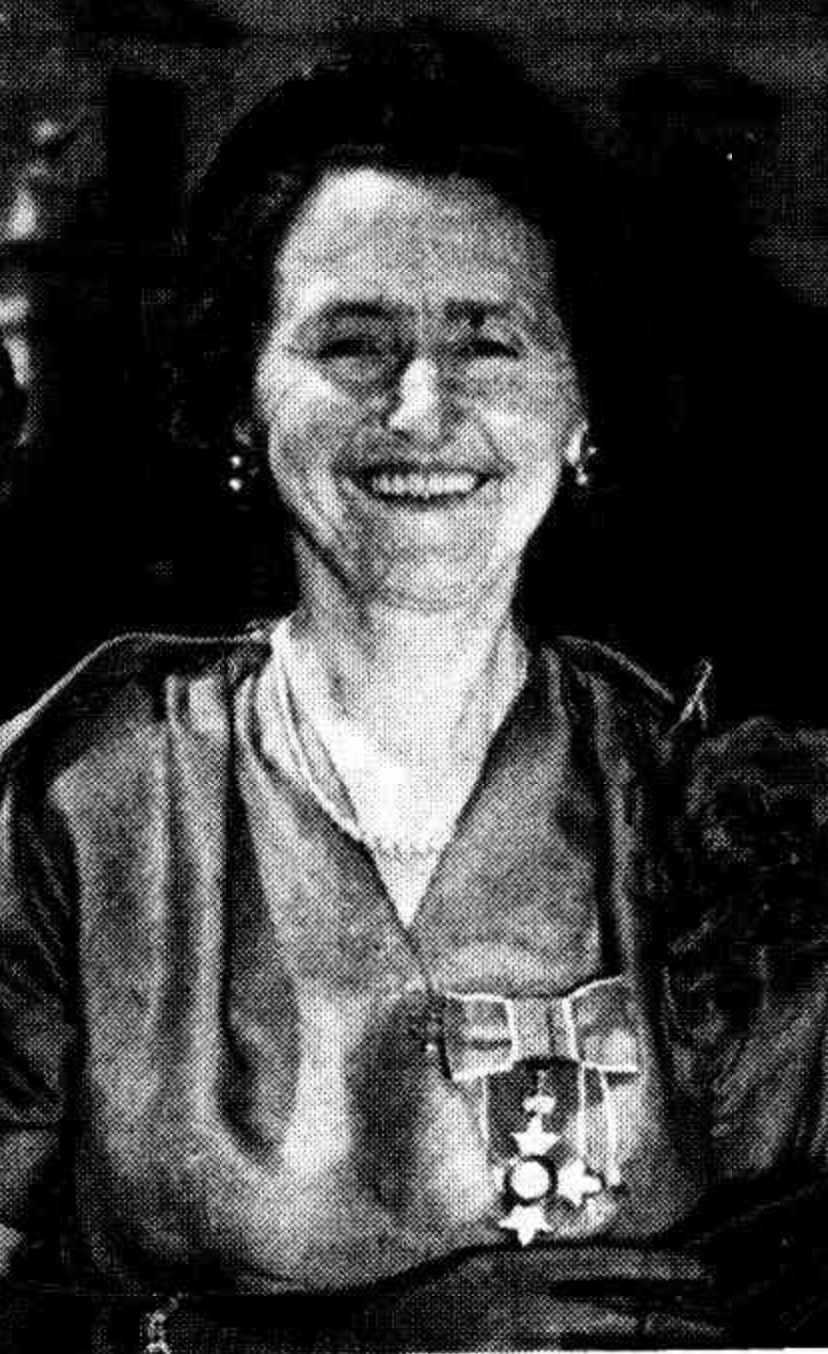
- Campbell, wearing her CBE, 4 March 1954
- Born: 22 April 1899; Hawthorn, Victoria, Australia
- Died: 12 July 1986 (aged 87); Camberwell, Victoria, Australia
- Education: University of Melbourne

Dame Kate Isabel Campbell (22 April 1899 – 12 July 1986) was a noted Australian physician and paediatrician. Campbell's discovery, that blindness in premature babies was caused by high concentrations of oxygen, resulted in the alteration of the treatment of premature babies world-wide and for this she received global recognition.

== Biography ==
=== Family ===
Born in Hawthorn, Melbourne to Scottish-born Donald Campbell, a clerk, and his wife, New Zealand-born Janet Duncan (née Mill), a former school teacher. Campbell was the third of four siblings. Her youngest brother Donald was the barrister who defended Frank Hardy in the Power without Glory trial.

=== Education ===
Despite Campbell's parents' appreciation for an education, the family's low financial situation meant her elder two brothers left school early. Campbell attended the Manningtree Road Primary School and while attending she was awarded a Junior Program Government Scholarship to the Methodist Ladies College, Melbourne. Later in 1917, she was provided a Senior Government Scholarship which enabled her to continue further studies at the University of Melbourne. Campbell completed her MBBS in 1922 and her MD in 1924. She graduated from medical school with figures including Jean Macnamara, Lucy Meredith Bryce, Jean Littlejohn, Frank Macfarlane Burnet, Rupert Willis and George Simpson.

=== Career ===
After graduating from her MBBS (1922), alongside Jean Macnamara, she was admitted to residency at the Royal Melbourne Hospital. At the hospital, female residents where habitually inhibited in their responsibilities by being restricted to less critical cases and being excluded from involvement in casualty duty. Campbell and Macnamara decided that they needed more experience and exposure in child and maternal health and so decided on moving to the Royal Children's Hospital where they became one of the first few female resident medical staff. However, initially the Children's Hospital had been claiming to lack the facilities needed to accommodate the female doctors. It was only until William Upjohn pleaded Campbell and Macnamara's special case with the hospital's board that they received the positions. In future years, Upjohn boasted "that [his] entry to heaven was assured by the fact that [he] got Jean Macnamara and Kate Campbell on at the Children's". It was stated by the Australian Dictionary of Biography that it was while holding a two-year-old girl's hand at the Children's Hospital that Campbell realised she wanted to specialise in children's health.

Due to gender discrimination in her work place, Campbell resigned and became the first honorary paediatrician at the Royal Women's Hospital, Melbourne from 1924 to 1927 where she filled the position of the Resident Medical Officer.

In 1927, Campbell established her own general medical practice in Essendon, Melbourne. She worked there for a decade. Coinciding with working at her general medical practice, she worked closely with Vera Scantlebury Brown who was introducing aspects of child welfare in Australia. Campbell and Brown knew each other previously from completing their Doctorates of Medicine (1924) at the University of Melbourne together. When Brown toured New Zealand to investigate the various infant care methods of Truby King, Campbell had assumed the training of infant welfare nurses which Brown had been responsible for. This was the initiation of Campbell's lifelong association with the Victorian Baby Health Centres Association, for which she was a medical officer for until 1965. Through the role of medical officer, the responsibilities were to visit centres throughout Victoria and act as examiner for the State Infant Welfare Certificate. Campbell and Brown wrote a book called A Guide to the Care of the Young Child (1947), which remained the standard reference textbook for sisters of infant welfare until 1972.

Despite sexism and discrimination against females then seeking medical careers, Campbell was named as "honorary paediatrician" to the Queen Victoria Hospital in 1926, resigning from the role in 1965.

From 1929-1965, alongside Campbell's responsibilities as medical officer, she was appointed the first clinical lecturer for the University of Melbourne in infant welfare, specialising in neonatal paediatrics. Through her lectures she educated a multitude of future doctors.

In 1965 until she retired in 1979, she was a consultant paediatrician at the Queen Victoria Hospital.

== Research and discoveries ==
Janet McCalman, Australian historian, described Campbell as having "clinical sensitivity, epidemiological curiosity and being meticulous"; qualities of which translated into evolving research on neonatal intensive care and a range of important advances in the medicine of newborns.

Her research led to the creation of various reports, some of which regarding: infection control, neonatal feeding, neonatal jaundice in premature infants, electrolyte and fluid tolerance in newborns and also the effects of trauma in delivery. Through all these investigations and research, she became a specialist in children's diseases.

Campbell's most distinguished contribution in research was, in 1951, in establishing and proving that excess therapeutic oxygen in humidicribs acquired retrolental fibroplasia - a condition which could lead to blindness in premature babies.

== Honours ==
For her contribution to children welfare, she was awarded:

- Commander of the Order of the British Empire (CBE) (1 January 1954)
- Co-winner with (Sir) Norman Gregg in being awarded the Encyclopædia Britannica award for medicine (1964).
- From the University of Melbourne, an Honorary Doctorate of Laws (LLD). (1966) This was also awarded to Dr. Jean Macnamara. This was the first time that the university had awarded the degree to females who were not of royalty.
- Appointed to the (Dame Commander) Order of the British Empire (DBE) (1 January 1971).
- Inducted to Victorian Honour Roll of Women in 2001.

== Affiliations ==
- Honorary fellow (1961) of the Royal College of Obstetricians and Gynaecologists.
- First female president (1965–66) of the Australian Paediatric Association.
- Member of the Lyceum Club.

== Death ==
Dame Kate Isabel Campbell retired in 1979 and died on 12 July 1986, aged 87, after a long illness. She died at Camberwell, Melbourne and was cremated. She never married.

== Legacy ==
- The Kate Campbell Scholarship
- The Royal Women's Hospital executive medical staff and staff of the University's Department of Obstetrics and Gynaecology donated £500 in 1961 for the Dr Kate Campbell Prize in Neonatal Paediatrics. This was awarded to a final year medical student for excellence in the subject.
- Dame Kate Campbell Fellowship at the University of Melbourne, awarded to "high performing researchers who reflect the faculty values and demonstrate excellence in research impact, national and international research standing, leadership and engagement".
