= Lucy Meredith Bryce =

Australian physician

Lucy Meredith Bryce CBE (12 June 1897 – 30 July 1968) was an Australian haematologist and medical researcher, who worked with the Australian Red Cross Society to establish the first blood transfusion service in Australia.

== Early life and education ==
Lucy Bryce was born in Lindfield, New South Wales, and educated in Melbourne, at the Melbourne Girls Grammar School. She entered Janet Clarke Hall, the women's hostel of Trinity College, University of Melbourne in 1915, earning degrees at the University of Melbourne in 1918 (B.Sc.) and 1922 (M.B., B.S.). Notable Australians who also graduated in her class included Dame Kate Isabel Campbell, Jean Littlejohn and Jean Macnamara.

== Career ==
Bryce started her career at the Walter and Eliza Hall Institute of Medical Research after college. While still in her twenties, she spent a year working at the Lister Institute in London. From 1928 to 1934, she was on staff as a bacteriologist at the Royal Melbourne Hospital, before launching a private practice as a pathologist.

Beginning in 1929, Bryce was the founding director of the Victoria Red Cross Blood Transfusion Service, which was Australia's first blood transfusion service. Her work involved planning how donors should be screened, and how blood should be typed and stored, and supervising the establishment of a blood reserve in case of major disaster.

During World War II, Bryce held the rank of major in the Australian Army Medical Corps and was invited in 1944 to the US with Marjorie Bick to study developments in blood transfusion, then again with Bick in 1945, arriving on the S.S. Kanangoora in March to visit the Hooper Research Foundation in Los Angeles then to New Orleans and Washington, attending a conference of the blood substitute committee of the National Research Council. Bryce then traveled to investigate clinical methods while Bick stayed on at Harvard. She reported on the mass production methods at the Cutter Laboratories of packing and shipping plasma and whole blood to be parachuted into the Pacific war zones. Their research coincided with a plan to expand the Blood Bank into a new floor of the Royal Melbourne Hospital.

In 1948, she was called upon as an expert witness in a case involving the identification of two newborns, alleged to have been switched at birth.

Bryce retired from active involvement in the Blood Bank in 1954, but continued to hold her title as honorary chair of the transfusion committee until 1966. She was named a Commander of the Order of the British Empire in 1951 for this work. Bryce wrote a history of the transfusion service, An Abiding Gladness (1965), as well as many scientific articles.

== Personal life and legacy ==
Bryce died in 1968, age 72.

There is a crater on Venus named for Bryce, and a portrait of her is on display in Lucy Bryce Hall, which houses the Central Blood Bank in Melbourne. Bryce Place in the Canberra suburb of Florey is named in her honour.

In 2001, Bryce was inducted posthumously to the Victorian Honour Roll of Women.
