= Marjorie Bick =

Australian woman biochemist

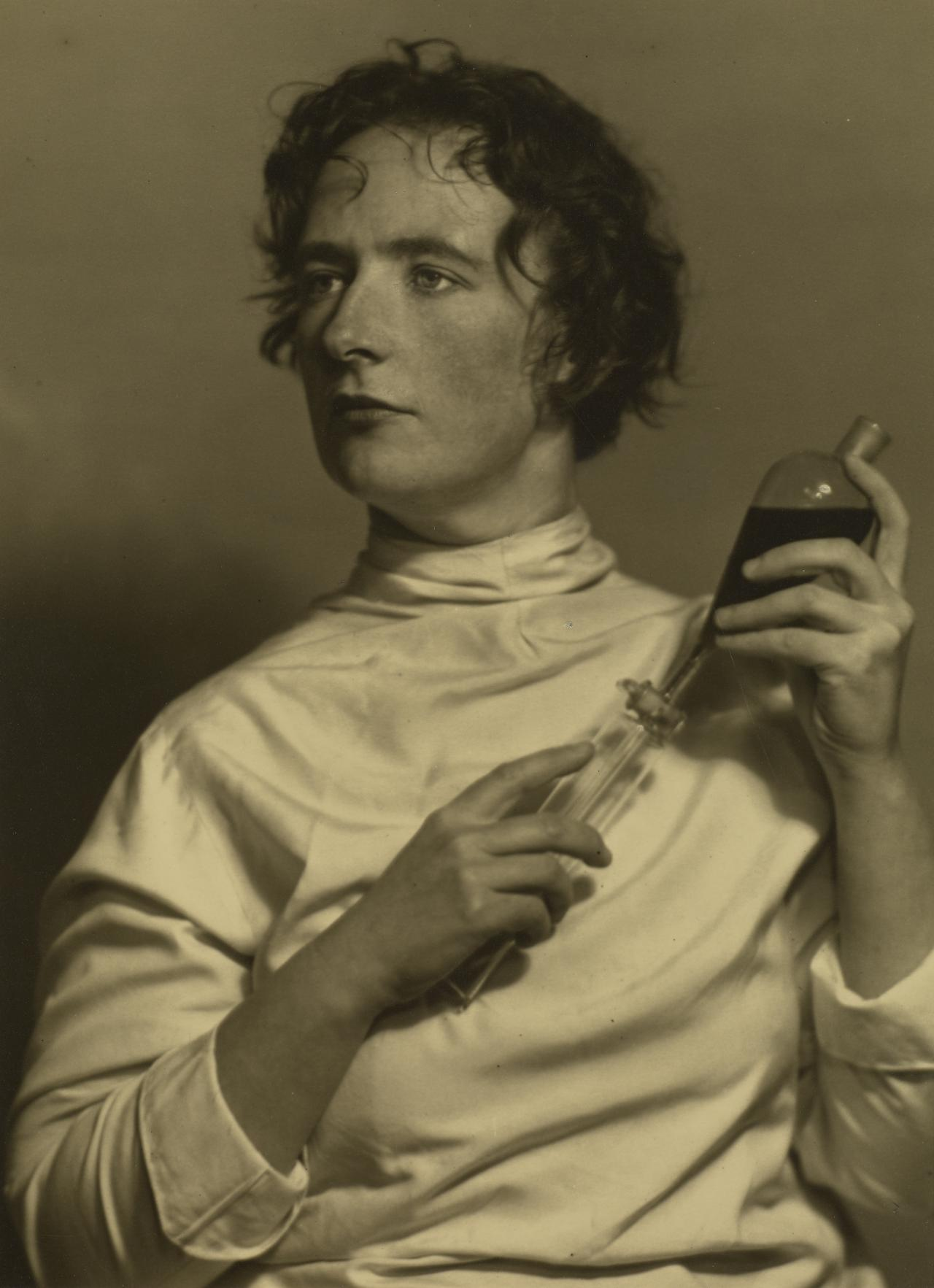
- Marjorie Bick MSc, 1940s, portrayed by Julian Smith
- Born: 11 December 1915; Sandringham, Australia
- Died: 18 October 2013 (aged 97); Brighton, Australia
- Other name: Elizabeth Dulcie
- Education: University of Melbourne
- Known for: blood pathology
- Father: Charles William Bick
- Scientific career
- Fields: biochemist, environmental scientist

Marjorie Elizabeth Dulcie Bick (11 December 1915 – 18 October 2013) was an Australian biochemist.

== Early life and education ==
Born the daughter of Charles William Bick of Sandringham, Marjorie studied at Firbank Girl's Grammar School from 1920 and matriculated in 1932 to undertake a Bachelor of Science degree at the University of Melbourne in 1937, then completed a Master of Science Degree at Melbourne in 1941.

== Biochemist ==
Bick began her career as a biochemist at the Walter and Eliza Hall Institute of Medical Research, which beside the Commonwealth Serum Laboratories, was then one of the few institutions offering women in Australia the opportunity of a scientific career. She was amongst a number of notable biochemists, mostly women, like Beryl Splatt and Lorna Silvester who had a major influence on the nation's development of clinical biochemistry, She worked in the field of blood transfusion specialising in the production of blood serum in the laboratory.

In 1939, she was seconded to the Australian Red Cross Society (Victorian Division) Blood Transfusion Services. In 1940, she drove from Melbourne with Sheila Summons, Nancy Hayward and Kathleen Gilles to attend the Science Congress in Canberra where she discussed problems in blood transfusion with the Adelaide committee.

== World War Two ==
Bick was invited to the USA and Canada with Dr Lucy Bryce to study developments in blood transfusion, and worked at Harvard University in the Plasma Fractionation Laboratory. Her research found a direct correlation between the platelet count of human blood, and its vasoconstrictor activity after clotting. Returning to Australia, she became biochemist to the Australian Red Cross Society, overseeing Victoria's Red Cross Blood Bank during WW2, during which she held the rank of captain in the Australian Army Medical Corps.

By 1944, she was Honorary Director of Training and Equipment at the Blood Bank in the Royal Melbourne Hospital and traveled again with Dr Bryce to study in America. They arrived on the S.S. Kanangoora in March 1945 and visited the Hooper Research Foundation in Los Angeles then traveled to New Orleans and Washington, and attended a conference of the Blood Substitutes Committee of the National Research Council.

Bryce then traveled to investigate clinical methods while Bick stayed on in Boston for eighteen months undertaking laboratory work on plasma fractionation in the Department of Physical Chemistry at Harvard Medical School under Professor Edwin J. Cohn, a pioneer in the field. She and Bryce reported on war conditions and attitudes to Australia in America and on the mass production methods at the Cutter Laboratories of packing and shipping plasma and whole blood to be parachuted into the Pacific war zones. Their research coincided with a plan to expand the Blood Bank into a new floor of the Royal Melbourne Hospital.

== Post-war career ==
In 1949, Bick concluded nine years of work for the Red Cross Blood Transfusion Service and joined the Alfred Hospital as a Senior Biochemist where she oversaw the management and implementation of new laboratory procedures at the Hospital. Recipient of a Fulbright Scholarship in 1955, she studied new techniques in the USA at the Massachusetts General Hospital, Boston, and in the United Kingdom at the Isotope School of the Atomic Energy Commission and at University College, London.

Bick was a founding member and Victorian representative 1961–1963 of the Australasian Association of Clinical Biochemists (AACB) which was established 26 May 1961 during an ANZAAS Congress in Brisbane.

Bick then pursued her interest in environmental science and was awarded a Research Scholarship for research at the National Institute of Environmental Health in North Carolina 1967–1969, and then 1969–1971 worked as a biochemist at the Medical Research Council, Division of Clinical Chemistry, in the United Kingdom, publishing on the effect of human exposure to pesticides and to hydrocarbons. Her analysis by gas-liquid chromatography of biopsy specimens of human body fat collected in 1965 from 53 individuals found DDT-derived material and dieldrin present in all samples; a mean concentration of total DDT equivalent stored was 1.81 ppm, and the mean concentration of dieldrin was 0.046 ppm. In other investigations she found that occupational exposure to esterase inhibitors used as pesticides in a group of orchardists, when spraying with reasonable care, is sufficient to cause a decrease in red-cell acetylcholinesterase activity.

Bick returned to Australia in 1972 and worked in Pre-Clinical Drug Evaluation at the Department of Health in Canberra and during the 1970s and 80s contributed to Drug Toxicity Evaluation at the Therapeutic Goods Administration.

== Personal life ==
In the 1950s, Bick was a member and secretary of the first all-women sailing club, The Victorian Ladies' Yacht Club. Retired in 1980, Bick ran a Victorian country Post Office and general store, later living in Canberra and then Brighton. She died on 18 October 2013.

== Publications ==
- Bick, Marjorie (1936). "Note On The Determination Of Proteins In Solution". IMCB Australian Journal of Experimental Biology and Medical Science. 14 (4): 305–306. doi:10.1038/icb.1936.28. ISSN 0004-945X. OCLC 7261507845.
- Baernstein, H. D; Bick, Marjorie (1938). "Untersuchung von Proteinen". Fresenius, Zeitschrift f. Anal. Chemie Zeitschrift für analytische Chemie (in German). 115 (5–6): 240. ISSN 0016-1152. OCLC 5653611660.
- Bick, Marjorie, Drevermann, E.B (1941). "A Method For The Rapid Alkalinization Of Urine". Medical Journal of Australia. 1 (8): 223–225. doi:10.5694/j.1326-5377.1941.tb100012.x. ISSN 0025-729X. OCLC 8259248377. S2CID 79074325.
- Bick, Marjorie, Wood, Ian J (1941). "The Biochemical Changes In Paralytic Ileus And Intestinal Obstruction". Medical Journal of Australia. 1 (5): 140–145. doi:10.5694/j.1326-5377.1941.tb71313.x. ISSN 0025-729X. OCLC 8259175814. S2CID 204038484.
- Bick, Marjorie, Drevermann; E. B (1941). "The Use Of Pooled Human Serum For The Treatment Of Haemokrhage And Shock". Medical Journal of Australia. 1 (25): 750–754. doi:10.5694/j.1326-5377.1941.tb108604.x. ISSN 0025-729X. OCLC 8259148654. S2CID 204059285.
- Rudduck, H. B; Bick, Marjorie, Henderson, Margaret (1941). "A Note On The Use Of The De Laval Separator In The Preparation Of Human Serum". Medical Journal of Australia. 2 (15): 416–418. doi:10.5694/j.1326-5377.1941.tb54135.x. ISSN 0025-729X. OCLC 8259108361. S2CID 204049790.
- Reid, G, Bick, Marjorie (1942). "Pharmacologically Active Substances In Serum". IMCB Australian Journal of Experimental Biology and Medical Science. 20 (1): 33–46. doi:10.1038/icb.1942.7. ISSN 0004-945X. OCLC 7261497758.
- Reid, G; Bick, Marjorie (1942). "Some Pharmacological Properties Of Serum With Special Reference To Its Use As A Blood Substitute". Medical Journal of Australia. 1 (9): 245–250. doi:10.5694/j.1326-5377.1942.tb95003.x. ISSN 0025-729X. OCLC 8259311928. S2CID 204058734.
- Jakobowicz, Rachel, Bick, Marjorie, Bryce, Lucy (1942). "A Comparison Of Agglutinin Content Of Rabbit's Serum After Injection Of Liquid And Dried Serum Of Rabbits Immunized With Human Group A Cells". Medical Journal of Australia. 2 (8): 143–144. doi:10.5694/j.1326-5377.1942.tb75848.x. ISSN 0025-729X. OCLC 8259103102. S2CID 204039225.
- Bick, Marjorie (1943). "The Concentration And Drying Of Serum For Intravenous Use". Medical Journal of Australia. 2 (12): 227–229. doi:10.5694/j.1326-5377.1943.tb88444.x. ISSN 0025-729X. OCLC 8259161667. S2CID 204035996.
- Bick, Marjorie (1945). "Some Observations On Certain Bacteriological And Serological Examinations Of Stored Blood". Medical Journal of Australia. 1 (11): 265–268. doi:10.5694/j.1326-5377.1945.tb54654.x. ISSN 0025-729X. OCLC 8259201266. S2CID 204035353.
- HUDSON, Bryan, Bick, Marjorie, Martin, F. I. R (1960). "Observations On The Treatment Of Severe Diabetic Ketosis". Australasian Annals of Medicine. 9 (1): 34–40. doi:10.1111/imj.1960.9.1.34. OCLC 7138810713. PMID 14403739.
- Bick, Marjorie (1967). "The Effect On Blood Cholinesterase Activity Of Chronic Exposure To Pesticides". Medical Journal of Australia. 1 (21): 1066–1070. doi:10.5694/j.1326-5377.1967.tb20871.x. ISSN 0025-729X. OCLC 8259163113. PMID 6028338. S2CID 36350544.
- Bick, Marjorie (1967). "Chlorinated Hydrocarbon Residues In Human Body Fat". Medical Journal of Australia. 1 (22): 1127–1130. doi:10.5694/j.1326-5377.1967.tb21320.x. ISSN 0025-729X. OCLC 8259109396. PMID 6026015.
- Bick, Marjorie, Fishbein, L (1972). "The inductive effect of piperonyl butoxide on microsomal demethylase activity". Science of the Total Environment. 1 (2): 197–203. Bibcode:1972ScTEn...1..197B. doi:10.1016/0048-9697(72)90006-X. ISSN 0048-9697. OCLC 4654958948. PMID 4667438.
- Bick, Marjorie, Fishbein, Lawrence (1972). "Effect of certain drugs and environmental agents on microsomal enzyme systems". Science of the Total Environment. 1 (2): 181–195. Bibcode:1972ScTEn...1..181B. doi:10.1016/0048-9697(72)90005-8. ISSN 0048-9697. OCLC 4926629847. PMID 4659103.
