= Jean Littlejohn =

Australian surgeon (1899–1990)

Jean Littlejohn CBE
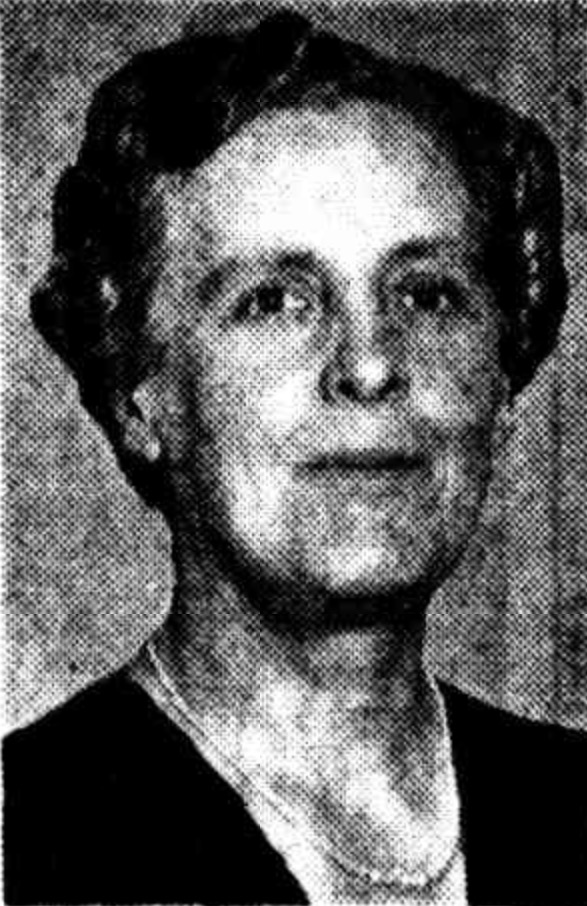
- Littlejohn in 1949
- Born: 3 April 1899; Nelson, New Zealand
- Died: 27 November 1990 (aged 91); East Melbourne, Victoria, Australia
- Education: Presbyterian Ladies' College
- Partner: Margareta Webber
- Relatives: William Still Littlejohn (father); Charles Littlejohn (brother)
- Medical career
- Profession: Surgeon
- Institutions: Royal Victorian Eye and Ear Hospital
- Sub-specialties: Otorhinolaryngology

Jean Littlejohn CBE (3 April 1899 – 27 November 1990) was an Australian surgeon, early practitioner of the developing field of otorhinolaryngology, and pioneer of deafness research. She joined the Royal Victorian Eye and Ear Hospital in Melbourne, Australia and maintained a long association with the hospital until her retirement in 1974.

== Early life ==
Jean Littlejohn was born on 3 April 1899 in Nelson, New Zealand, the youngest of the five children of Scottish-born William Still Littlejohn and Jean (née Berry). The family moved to Melbourne in 1904 when William Littlejohn was appointed headmaster of Scotch College. Jean was educated at Scotch College's sister school, Presbyterian Ladies' College, where she found both academic and sporting success.

== Career ==
Littlejohn studied medicine at the University of Melbourne, graduating in 1922; her graduating class also included Dame Kate Isabel Campbell, Lucy Meredith Bryce and Jean Macnamara.

She then and joined the Royal Victorian Eye and Ear Hospital as a medical resident. She began private practice in 1924 while continuing to work at the Eye and Ear Hospital, where she was promoted successively to the positions of assistant surgeon in 1929, honorary aural surgeon (the first woman to hold this position) in the same year, and senior surgeon in 1933.

Littlejohn was drawn to the new field of ear, nose, and throat surgery (otorhinolaryngology), which was developing rapidly at this time along with technological advances that enabled more precise surgical investigation and treatment of these areas. The University of Melbourne began offering qualifications in otolaryngology in 1930, and Littlejohn was the first recipient of the university's Diploma of Otolaryngology, in 1933. She was admitted as a Fellow of the Royal Australasian College of Surgeons in 1935.

During World War II Littlejohn served as an ENT surgeon to the armed forces. In 1947 she was appointed clinical dean of the Eye and Ear Hospital and became the first woman elected to the University of Melbourne faculty of medicine. In 1948 Littlejohn established the Eye and Ear Hospital's Infant Deafness Investigation Clinic, and in the 1970s she advised the State of Victoria on establishing postgraduate audiology training in Australia.

== Recognition ==
Littlejohn was made an Officer of the Order of the British Empire in 1962 for services to the Deaf in Victoria, and a Commander of the Order in 1975 for services to medicine. In 1957 the Eye and Ear Hospital consolidated its deafness research under the umbrella of the Jean Littlejohn Deafness Investigation and Research Unit. In 1978 the University of Melbourne's Department of Otolaryngology awarded the first biennial Jean Littlejohn Otorhinolaryngology research prize. On International Women's Day 2025, the University of Melbourne launched the Littlejohn medal to honour "outstanding contributions to knowledge and research across health and medical disciplines".

== Personal life and death ==
Littlejohn lived with her companion, the bookseller Margareta Webber, for over fifty years. They met in 1928 when Webber was referred to Littlejohn as an ENT patient. In collaboration with Webber, Littlejohn founded the Soroptimist Club of Melbourne in 1948. Littlejohn died on 27 November 1990 in East Melbourne.
