= Jean Macnamara =

Australian medical doctor and scientist (1899-1968)

Dame Jean Macnamara DBE
- Dame Jean Macnamara in 1967
- Born: Annie Jean Macnamara; 1 April 1899; Beechworth, Victoria, Australia
- Died: 13 October 1968 (aged 69); South Yarra, Victoria, Australia
- Resting place: Ashes were buried under a mossy rock at Beechworth
- Education: Presbyterian Ladies' College, Melbourne; University of Melbourne
- Occupations: Australian medical doctor and scientist
- Spouse: Joseph Ivan Connor (m. 1934)
- Children: 2

Dame Annie Jean Connor DBE (née Macnamara; 1 April 1899 – 13 October 1968), known as Jean Macnamara, was an Australian medical doctor and scientist, best known for her contributions to children's health and welfare. She was appointed a Commander of the Order of the British Empire in 1935.

== Early life and education ==
Annie Jean Macnamara was born on 1 April 1899 to John and Annie Macnamara in Beechworth, Victoria. Her family moved to Melbourne when she was seven and she attended Spring Road State School. She received a scholarship to study at the Presbyterian Ladies' College and she entered the University of Melbourne at age 17. She graduated M.B. and B.S. in 1922. Other notable Australians who also graduated in her class included Dame Kate Isabel Campbell, Lucy Meredith Bryce, Jean Littlejohn, and Sir Frank Macfarlane Burnet.

== Career ==
After graduating, she became a resident medical officer at the Royal Melbourne Hospital. In 1923, Macnamara became a resident doctor at the Royal Children's Hospital in Melbourne. Hospital authorities had at first been reluctant to employ her on the grounds that it had no toilet facilities for women doctors. During her time at the Children's Hospital, there was a polio outbreak. She and Burnet demonstrated that there was more than one strain of the virus, a fact that would be important in the later development of the Salk vaccine. Between 1925 and 1931 she was consultant and medical officer responsible to the Poliomyelitis Committee of Victoria, and between 1930 and 1931 was an honorary adviser on polio to official authorities in New South Wales, South Australia and Tasmania.

In 1931, she received a Rockefeller Fellowship to travel to England and United States to study orthopaedics. She met President Franklin D. Roosevelt. When she returned to Australia in 1934 she married dermatologist Joseph Ivan Connor, and they had two daughters, Joan and Merran. She conducted a successful orthopaedic work, and for this contribution was created DBE in 1935. Although she was considered the foremost Australian authority on the treatment of poliomyelitis, she continued to recommend the use of convalescent serum and splinting to immobilise limbs long after these treatments were abandoned in America.

In the 1930s, she encouraged the Australian government to trial the myxoma virus to combat the Australian rabbit plague. Although trials were initially unsuccessful, she lobbied that they be continued, and when the virus became epizootic in 1951, the mosquito vector spread the virus among wild rabbits, killing millions.

== Death and legacy ==
Macnamara died at the age of 69 from cardiovascular disease in 1968 in South Yarra.

Seven other Australian medical scientists were commemorated in the issue of a set of four Australian stamps released in 1995. She appears on the 45 cent stamp with fellow University of Melbourne graduate, Sir Frank Macfarlane Burnet.

She was inducted onto the Victorian Honour Roll of Women in 2001.

In 2018, the Australian Electoral Commission renamed the federal electoral division of Melbourne Ports to Macnamara in her honour.

A suburb of Canberra was named Macnamara, Australian Capital Territory in commemoration of Jean Macnamara. Macnamara Place, in the Canberra suburb of Chisholm, is also named in her honour. Jean Macnamara Street and Jean Macnamara Playground in the Canberra suburb of Macgregor are also named for her.

On 1 April 2020, Google honoured her 121st birthday with a Google Doodle.

== Awards and honours ==
- 1935: Dame Commander of the Order of the British Empire
