= William Still Littlejohn =

Australian headmaster (1859–1933)

William Littlejohn
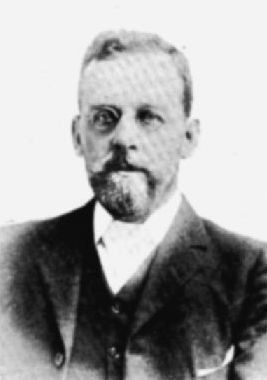

10th Headmaster of Nelson College
- In office 1899–1903
- Preceded by: John William Joynt
- Succeeded by: Harry Lewis Fowler

3rd Headmaster of Scotch College, Melbourne
- In office 1904–1933
- Preceded by: Alexander Morrison
- Succeeded by: Colin Macdonald Gilray

Personal details
- Born: William Still Littlejohn; 19 September 1859 Turriff, Aberdeenshire, Scotland
- Died: 7 October 1933 (aged 74) Hawthorn, Victoria, Australia
- Spouse: Jeannie Berry (m. 1885)
- Relations: Charles Littlejohn (son); Jean Littlejohn (daughter)
- Children: 5
- Cricket career

Cricket information

Domestic team information
- Years: Team
- 1885/86–1886/87: Nelson
- First-class debut: 19 March 1886 Nelson v Wellington
- Last First-class: 29 December 1886 Nelson v Wellington

Career statistics
Competition	First-class
Matches	2
Runs scored	8
Batting average	2.66
100s/50s	0/0
Top score	8
Catches/stumpings	0/0
- Source: CricketArchive, 4 February 2016

William Still Littlejohn (19 September 1859 – 7 October 1933) was a Scottish-born schoolteacher who spent most of his working life in New Zealand and in Victoria, Australia. He was headmaster of Nelson College from 1899 to 1903, and of Scotch College, Melbourne from 1904 to 1933. As a cricketer, he played two-first class games for Nelson in 1886, and was involved as an official in rugby union in New Zealand and Victoria.

== Biography ==
Littlejohn was born in Turriff, Aberdeenshire, Scotland, the son of Wilson Littlejohn, a watchmaker and jeweller, and his wife Margaret, née Gordon. Educated at the board schools at Alford and Peterhead, and Aberdeen Grammar School, Littlejohn then entered the University of Aberdeen, graduating with a Master of Arts degree in 1879. He was registered as a teacher in 1879 and taught at Clydesdale College, Hamilton, then tutored privately.

Littlejohn's father and brother had emigrated to New Zealand, and in 1881 they obtained nominated passages for the rest of the family. William Littlejohn was mathematics and science master at Nelson College from 1882 to 1898, and headmaster for five years from 1899 to 1903. He married Jeannie Berry in Wellington on 25 December 1885. The couple had five children, including Charles Littlejohn and Jean Littlejohn.

During his time in Nelson, Littlejohn played two first-class matches as a batsman for the Nelson cricket team in 1886. In his three innings he scored only eight runs, including two ducks. He also served as president of the Nelson Rugby Union and then in the same capacity for the New Zealand Rugby Union.

in 1904 Littlejohn successfully applied for the position of headmaster at Scotch College, Melbourne, which he held for the next 30 years. He was a vice-president of the Victorian Rugby Union in 1910 and in 1932 oversaw the College play against Melbourne Grammar School in the first rugby union match between APS schools in Victoria. In September 1933 Littlejohn retired from his headmaster role due to failing health and very soon after passed away on 7 October 1933.
