= Charles Littlejohn (rower) =

New Zealand rower

Charles Littlejohn CBE MC
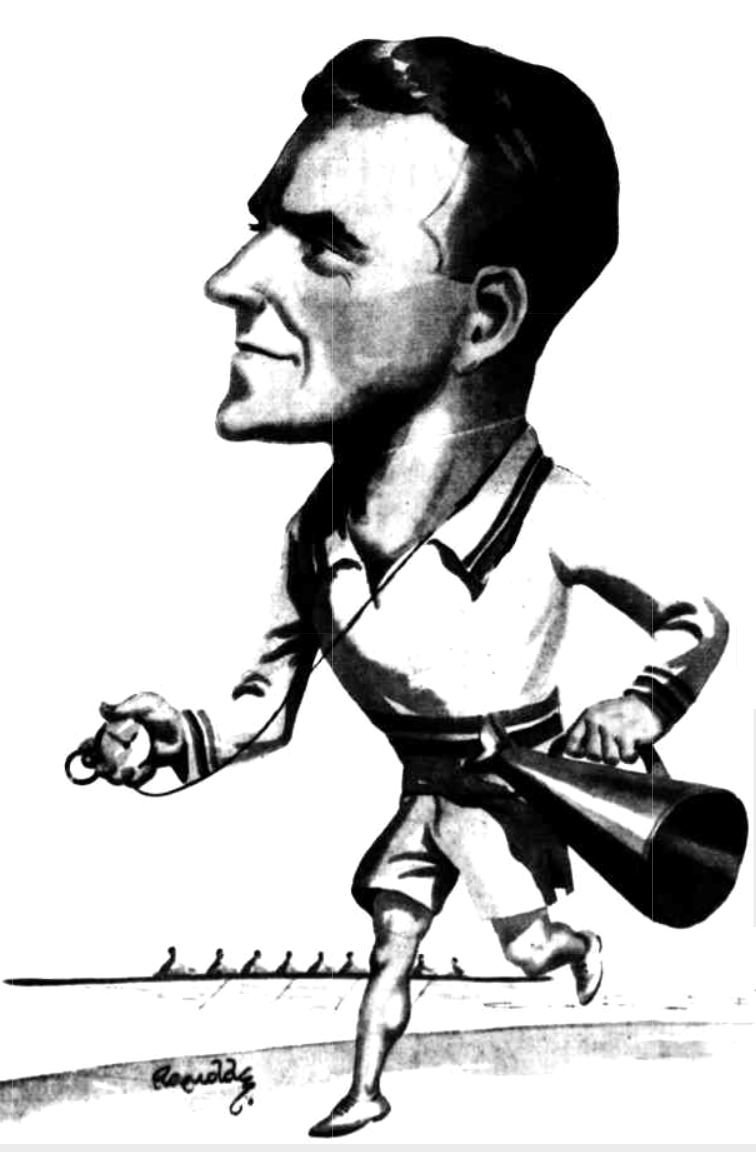
- 1930 caricature by Reynolds

Personal information
- Born: Charles William Berry Littlejohn; 4 January 1889 Nelson, New Zealand
- Died: 4 August 1960 (aged 71) Toorak, Victoria, Australia
- Relatives: William Still Littlejohn (father); Jean Littlejohn (sister)
Medal record
Representing United Kingdom
Men's rowing
Silver medal – second place	1912 Stockholm	Men's eight

Charles William Berry Littlejohn CBE MC (4 January 1889 – 4 August 1960) was a New Zealand-born rower who competed for Great Britain in the 1912 Summer Olympics.

Born in Nelson, New Zealand, on 4 January 1889, Littlejohn was the son of William Still Littlejohn and Jeannie Littlejohn (née Berry). He was educated at Nelson College from 1898 to 1903, and later went to New College, Oxford as a Rhodes Scholar (from Ormond College, Melbourne University) where he was a Diploma student in anthropology. He was a member of the winning Oxford crews in the Boat Race in 1911 and 1912. He was also a member of the New College eight which won the silver medal for Great Britain rowing at the 1912 Summer Olympics. He served with the Royal Army Medical Corps in World War I and was decorated with the Military Cross. He was further awarded the CBE and was Mentioned in Despatches during World War II while serving with the Australian Army.

== See also ==
- List of Oxford University Boat Race crews
