= William Brookes (miner) =

Australian goldminer, pastoralist and manufacturer

William Brookes (April 1834 – 4 September 1910) was a gold miner, pastoralist and paper manufacturer, included in the Australian Dictionary of Biography.

Brookes was born in Northampton, England, to Frances Campion and John Brookes. He arrived in Australia at the age of 18 and immediately went to Sandhurst where he set up a profitable business as a grating maker and began to invest in mining ventures. The most successful of his investments was his investment of £25 in his stake of the Golden Fleece mine which netted him £30,000 when a deep shaft struck a rich reef of gold.

He married wife Catherine Margaret, née Robinson, on 10 January 1865 and they had seven children: William Ernest (1865 – 1879), businessman, pastoralist, public official and philanthropist Herbert Brookes (1867-1963) who married Ivy Deakin, Mabel Catherine (1870- 1916) who married James Bertram, Percy Campion (1872-1873), May (1874 – 1938), businessman and pastoralist Harold Brookes who married Dorothy Clare Bird, and businessman, pastoralist and champion tennis player Sir Norman Brookes (1877-1968) who married Mabel Balcombe Emmerton.

After spending 18 years in Sandhurst (now Bendigo) in 1871 he and his family moved to Melbourne where he built a grand house called Brookwood in Queens Rd, St Kilda. In 1878, he moved the family to Government Gums, South Australia, where for two years he oversaw the completion of part of the Central Australia Railway.

In May 1882 Archibald Currie and William Brookes purchased the Melbourne Paper Company located near Princess Bridge at Southbank for £47,000 from George Ramsden, the son of its founder Samuel Ramsden. The firm Australian Paper Mills (A.P.M.) was formed in 1895 with the combination of the Southbank mill with the mills at Broadford and Geelong. The company's capital was £107,000 and its output was approximately 730 tons per year. The following year, it became the Australian Paper Mills Company Ltd. Three generations of the Brookes family: William, sons Herbert Brookes, Harold and Sir Norman Brookes, and grandsons John Dougan Brookes and Sir Wilfred Deakin Brookes had a significant impact on the Australian paper industry.

In the late 1880s he took up large pastoral leaseholds at “Brookwood”, “Westbury” and “Texas” in Central Queensland. Brookwood remained in the ownership of the family company William Brookes and Co. until it was sold in 1964.

He later became a shareholder and director of the engineering firm Austral Otis.

In 1889 he bought the notable home and garden at Penola, 222 Alton Rd, Mt Macedon which remained in the Brookes family until 1951.

He died on 4 September in 1910 leaving an estate valued at £172,000.
