= Catherine Deakin =

Australian musician (1850-1937)

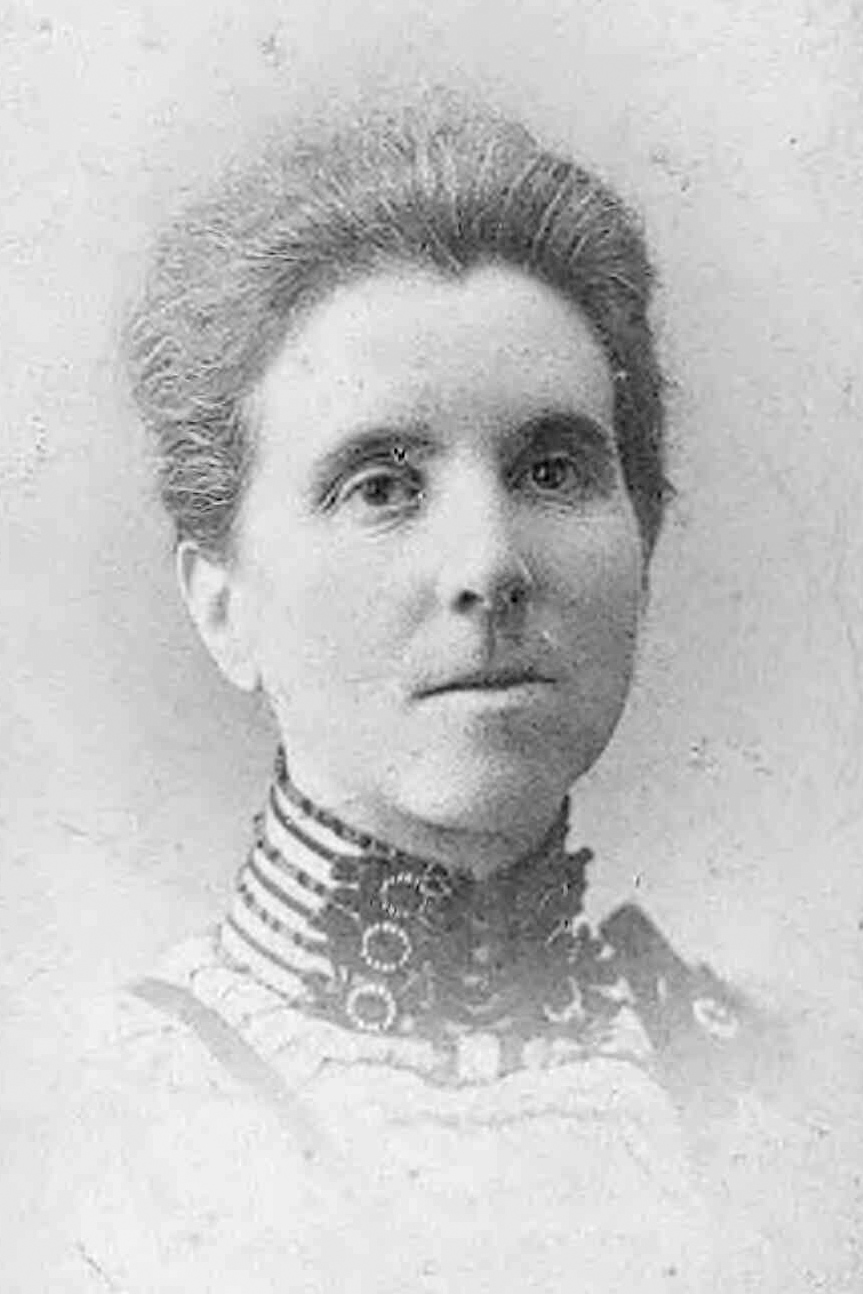
- Born: Catherine Sarah Deakin; 1850; Adelaide, South Australia, Australia
- Died: 1937 (aged 86–87); The Elms, Fitzroy, Victoria, Australia
- Occupations: Pianist; Music teacher

Catherine Sarah Deakin (also known as Katie and Kate) (1850–1937) was an Australian music teacher and pianist. She was the sister of Alfred Deakin, to whom she was very close. He served as Prime Minister of Australia.

== Early life and education ==
Catherine Deakin was born in Adelaide, South Australia in 1850. Her parents were William and Sarah Bill Deakin. In 1851, the family moved to Fitzroy, outside of Melbourne. Her brother, Alfred Deakin, was born in 1856. From 1858-1862, Deakin attended school in Kyneton at Miss Thomson's School and from 1863 until 1865 she attended Miss Thomson's School in South Yarra. It was at these schools where Deakin learned to play piano.

Deakin studied at Presbyterian Ladies' College, Melbourne before matriculating to the University of Melbourne. At the time, she was the only woman to pass the matriculation examination. She graduated from the Melbourne School of Music in 1882.

== Career and adult life ==
Deakin taught piano and music theory privately, including to her brother Alfred's daughters, Ivy, Vera and Stella. She taught the children at The Elms, where Deakin lived with her parents.

She was fluent in French and was "extremely well read" in politics and literature. She was in the same social circle as Ferdinand von Mueller.

Deakin never married. However, she was in love with John Henning Thompson, a school master. Her family disapproved of their relationship.

=== Relationship with her brother, Alfred Deakin ===
Deakin remained close with her brother her entire life. Alfred frequently referred to Deakin in his diary, calling her "K". Historian Marjorie R. Theobald described Deakin as the most important person in Alfred's life. She advised Alfred on political and intellectual matters, influencing his role as Australian prime minister.

Deakin served as a pseudo-surrogate mother to Deakin's daughters, specifically when they were travelling internationally. She travelled regularly with the girls, accompanying them to Berlin and Budapest for studies.

== Later life and legacy ==
Deakin died at The Elms on 3 November 1937. She is buried at St Kilda Cemetery.
