= Alfred Deakin =

Second prime minister of Australia (1856–1919)

The Honourable Alfred Deakin
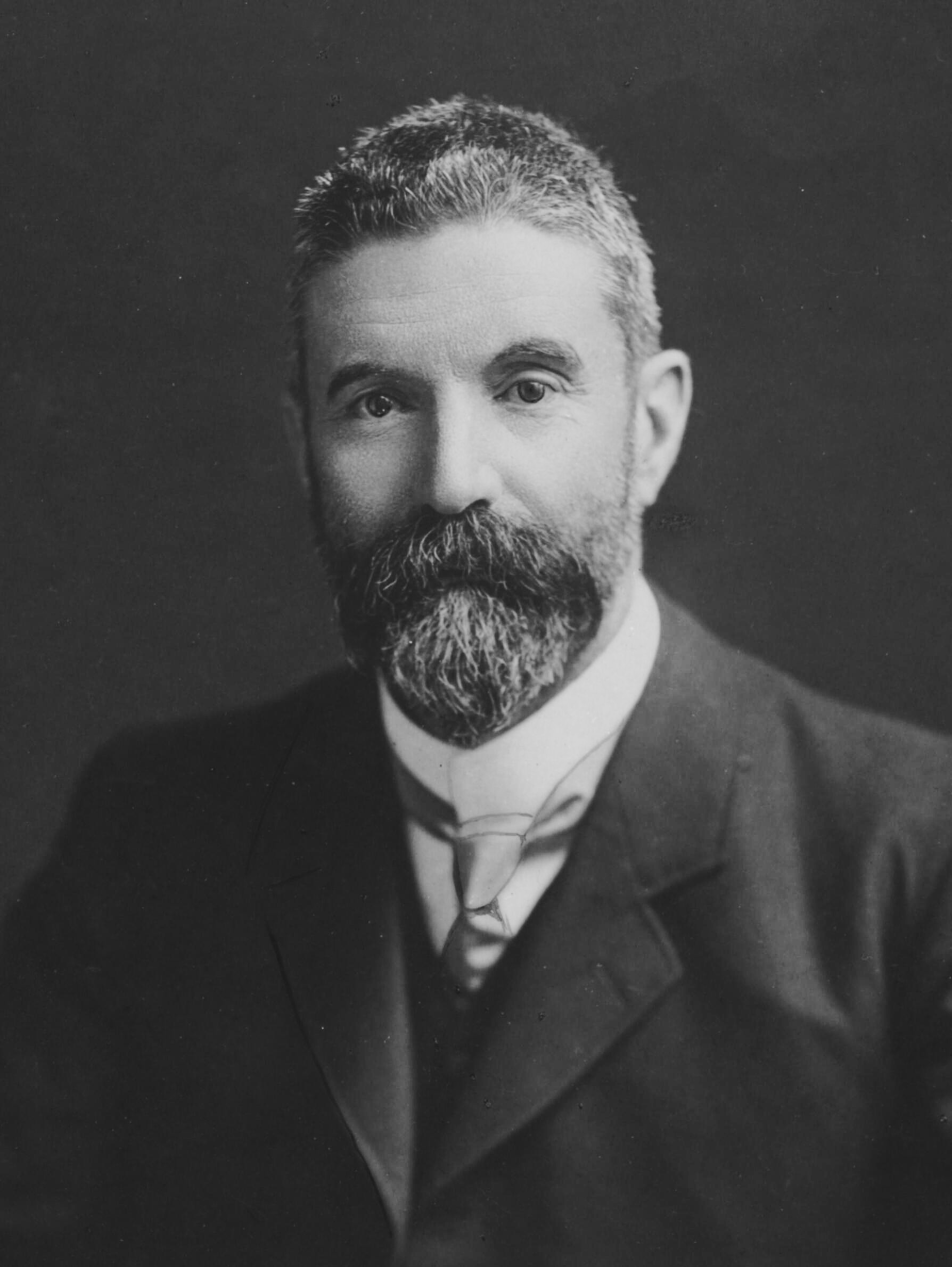
- Official portrait, 1905

2nd Prime Minister of Australia
- In office 2 June 1909 – 29 April 1910
- Monarch: Edward VII
- Governor-General: Lord Dudley
- Preceded by: Andrew Fisher
- Succeeded by: Andrew Fisher
- In office 5 July 1905 – 13 November 1908
- Monarch: Edward VII
- Governors-General: Lord Northcote; Lord Dudley
- Preceded by: George Reid
- Succeeded by: Andrew Fisher
- In office 24 September 1903 – 27 April 1904
- Monarch: Edward VII
- Governors-General: Lord Tennyson; Lord Northcote
- Preceded by: Edmund Barton
- Succeeded by: Chris Watson

Leader of the Opposition
- In office 1 July 1910 – 20 January 1913
- Prime Minister: Andrew Fisher
- Preceded by: Andrew Fisher
- Succeeded by: Joseph Cook
- In office 26 May 1909 – 2 June 1909
- Prime Minister: Andrew Fisher
- Preceded by: Joseph Cook
- Succeeded by: Andrew Fisher
Party leadership positions
Leader of the Liberal Party
In office 26 May 1909 – 20 January 1913
Deputy	Joseph Cook
Preceded by	Position established
Succeeded by	Joseph Cook
Leader of the Protectionist Party
In office 24 September 1903 – 26 May 1909
Deputy	Sir William Lyne
Preceded by	Edmund Barton
Succeeded by	Party dissolved
Cabinet posts
Minister for External Affairs
In office 5 July 1905 – 13 November 1908
Prime Minister	Himself
Preceded by	George Reid
Succeeded by	Lee Batchelor
In office 24 September 1903 – 27 April 1904
Prime Minister	Himself
Preceded by	Edmund Barton
Succeeded by	Billy Hughes
Attorney-General of Australia
In office 1 January 1901 – 24 September 1903
Prime Minister	Edmund Barton
Preceded by	Position established
Succeeded by	James Drake
Constituencies
Member of the Australian Parliament for Ballaarat
In office 30 March 1901 – 23 April 1913
Preceded by	Seat created
Succeeded by	Charles McGrath
Member of the Victorian Legislative Assembly
In office April 1889 – October 1900
Preceded by	Seat created
Succeeded by	Edward Warde
Constituency	Essendon and Flemington
In office July 1880 – March 1889
Preceded by	Robert Harper
Succeeded by	Seat abolished
In office July 1879 – August 1879
Preceded by	John Smith
Succeeded by	Robert Harper

Personal details
- Born: 3 August 1856 Fitzroy, Colony of Victoria
- Died: 7 October 1919 (aged 63) South Yarra, Victoria, Australia
- Resting place: St Kilda Cemetery
- Party: Independent (until 1901); Protectionist (1901–1909); Liberal (after 1909)
- Spouse: Pattie Browne (m. 1882)
- Children: 3, including Ivy and Vera
- Relatives: Wilfred Brookes (grandson); Alfred Brookes (grandson); Rohan Deakin Rivett (grandson)
- Education: Melbourne Grammar School; University of Melbourne (no degree)
- Profession: Barrister

Alfred Deakin (3 August 1856 – 7 October 1919) was the second prime minister of Australia. He served three terms from 1903 to 1904, from 1905 to 1908, and from 1909 to 1910. He held office as the leader of the Protectionist Party, and in his final term as that of the Liberal Party. He is notable for being one of the fathers of Federation and for his influence in early Australian politics.

Deakin was born in Melbourne to middle-class parents. He was elected to the Victorian Legislative Assembly in 1879, aged 23, additionally working as a barrister and journalist. He held ministerial office sporadically beginning in 1883, aligning himself with liberal and radical reformers. In the 1890s, Deakin became one of the leading figures in the movement for the federation of the Australian colonies. He was a delegate to the federal conventions and served on the committees that drafted the federal constitution. He later campaigned at a series of referendums and lobbied the British government for its adoption.

After the Federation in 1901, Deakin became the inaugural attorney-general of Australia in the ministry led by his close friend Edmund Barton. He succeeded Barton as prime minister in September 1903. Two subsequent elections in 1903 and 1906 produced an even split between three parties, with Deakin's Liberal Protectionist Party occupying an effective middle ground between the Free Traders and the Australian Labor Party (ALP). He left office in April 1904 following an unproductive first term but returned in July 1905 and was able to form a functional government with the support of the ALP. He relinquished office again in August 1908.

In 1909, in what became known as the Fusion, Deakin controversially led his supporters into a union with the Free Traders. Their alliance, based on anti-socialism, marked the beginning of a two-party system in federal politics and allowed him to form Australia's first majority government. Deakin regarded his final term as prime minister, from June 1909 to April 1910, as his most productive. However, to his surprise, the ALP won a majority in both houses at the 1910 election. He retired from politics in 1913, in the early stages of a degenerative neurological condition that led to his death at the age of 63.

Deakin is regarded as one of Australia's most influential prime ministers. He was the principal architect of the "Australian settlement", the features of which – the White Australia policy, compulsory arbitration, protectionism, state paternalism, and support for the British Empire – formed the basis of Australia's socio-economic framework well into the 20th century.

== Early life ==
=== Birth and family background ===
Deakin was born on 3 August 1856 in his parents' cottage at 90 George Street, Fitzroy, Melbourne, Victoria. He was of English and Welsh descent, the younger of two children born to Sarah (née Bill) and William Deakin. (Note: His paternal grandfather John Deakin was born in Staffordshire, and worked in the leather industry as a currier before later becoming an excise officer. He married the daughter of Buckinghamshire farmer, and their son – Deakin's father – was born in Towcester, Northamptonshire. Deakin's mother was born in Llanarth, Monmouthshire, the daughter and granddaughter of farmers; her ancestors were from the border counties of Monmouthshire, Brecknockshire and Shropshire.) His father left school at the age of 14 and became a travelling salesman. He met his future wife while travelling through Abergavenny, and they married at Grosmont, Monmouthshire in 1849. Britain was experiencing an economic depression associated with the Panic of 1847, and they decided to migrate to Australia. The Deakins arrived in Adelaide, South Australia, in March 1850. Their first child Catherine (known as Kate) was born in July 1850, at which point her father was working as a storekeeper and clerk. The family moved to Melbourne as a result of the Victorian gold rush, which began the following year. William Deakin initially struggled to find steady employment, but later became involved with the carrying and coaching trade, transporting people and goods; he was listed as a carrier at the time of his son's birth in 1856. By the early 1870s, he was working with Cobb & Co as a manager, inspector, and accountant, earning a salary that allowed he and his family to maintain a comfortable middle-class lifestyle.

=== Childhood and education ===
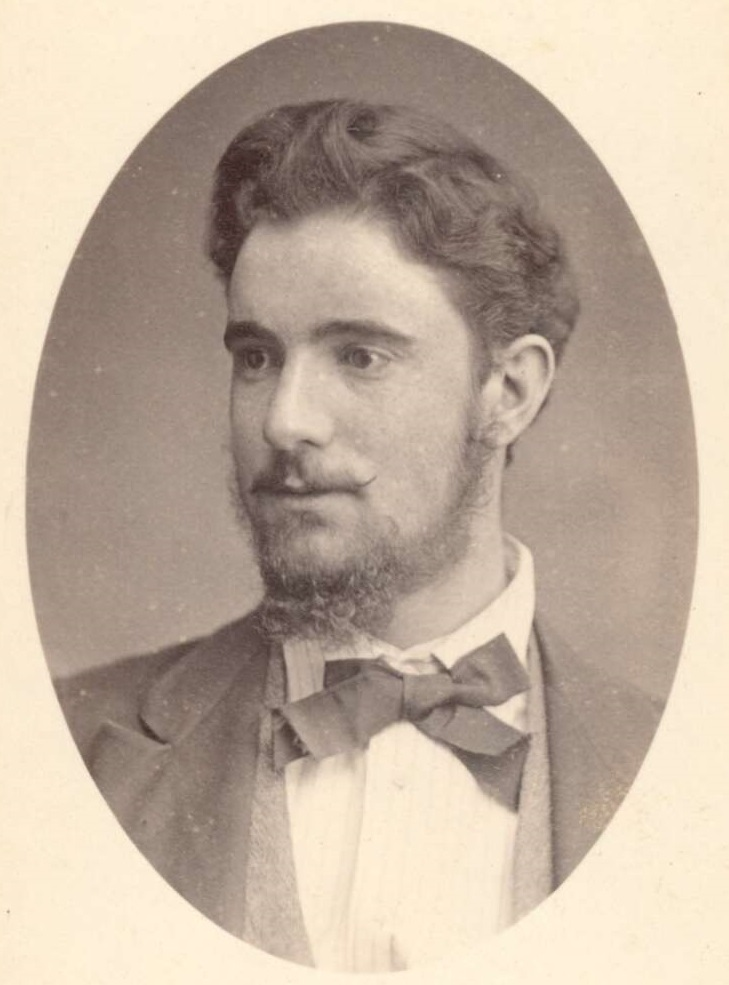
Deakin as a young man in 1877

Deakin spent his early years in Fitzroy, then lived briefly in Emerald Hill (now South Melbourne) before his family settled in South Yarra in about 1863. Rather than build an entirely new house, his father transported a wooden cottage from Fitzroy to South Yarra and then had it brick-nogged. His parents and sister would live there for the rest of their lives. At the age of four, Deakin was sent to join his ten-year-old sister in Kyneton, a small country town where she was attending a girls' boarding school run by the Thompson sisters. He was the only male pupil at the school. It was unusual for children to be sent away at such a young age, and his biographer Judith Brett has speculated that their mother may have been suffering from a bout of depression or recovering from a stillbirth. The Thompson sisters eventually moved their school to Melbourne, which Deakin continued to attend until the age of seven. In early 1864, he was enrolled at Melbourne Grammar School as a day-boy. He attended Melbourne Grammar for eight years, where he was a good student without excelling academically. He later recalled that he had been "an incessantly restless, random and at times studiously mischievous pupil", and regretted that he had not been made to work harder. Deakin was also passionate about Australian rules football a game which he played during his youth, though it is not known for which clubs or teams he played in.

In 1871, aged 15, Deakin passed the matriculation exam for the University of Melbourne. He formed an ambition to become a barrister, and began attending evening classes the following year. He could not afford to study full-time, working during the day as a schoolteacher and private tutor. At the time, the Victorian Bar did not require a complete university degree for admission, only passing grades in relevant legal subjects. Deakin was consequently admitted to the bar in September 1877, aged 21, without ever graduating from university. According to his biographer John La Nauze, his legal studies were "the least important part of his education" during his time at university. He was a frequent speaker in the Melbourne University Debating Society, where he was mentored by Charles Henry Pearson, and was also involved in the Eclectic Society. He spent much of his spare time reading, "from Chaucer to the great writers of his own time". For some time Deakin was "more interested in dreams of being a dramatist, a poet or a philosopher" rather than a lawyer. He wrote numerous works of blank verse and narrative poetry, and in 1875 published Quentin Massys, a drama in five acts.

Deakin initially had difficulty in obtaining briefs as a barrister. In May 1878, he met David Syme, the owner of the Melbourne daily The Age, who paid him to contribute reviews, leaders and articles on politics and literature. In 1880, he became editor of The Leader, The Age's weekly. During this period Syme converted him from supporting free trade to protectionism. He became active in the Australian Natives' Association and began to practise vegetarianism. He became a lifelong spiritualist, holding the office of President of the Victorian Spiritualists' Union.

== Early political career ==
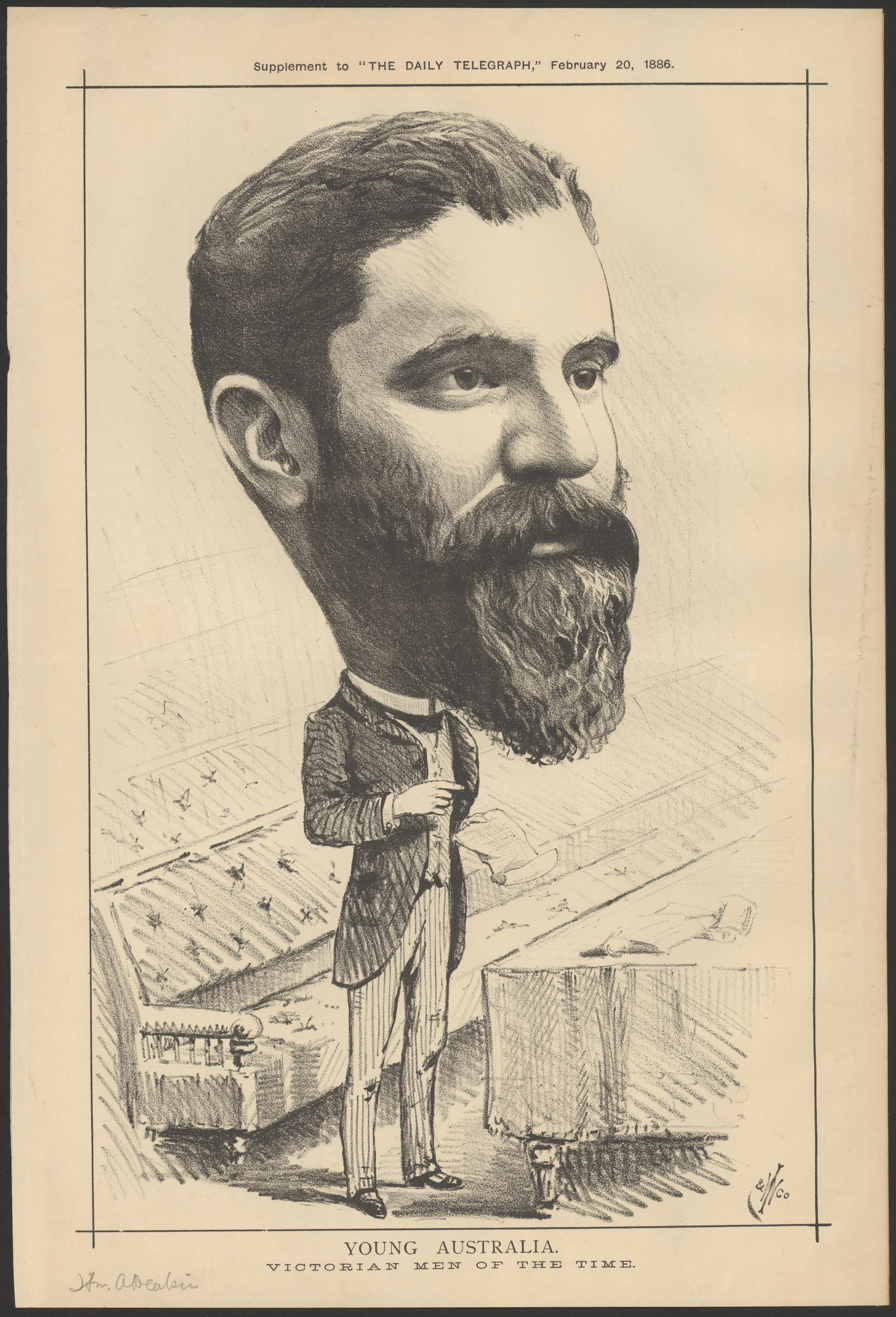
Caricature of Deakin in 1886

Deakin stood for the largely rural seat of West Bourke in the Victorian Legislative Assembly in February 1879, as a supporter of Victorian Legislative Council reform, protection to encourage manufacturing and the introduction of a land tax to break up the big agricultural estates, and won by 79 votes. Due to a number of voters being disenfranchised by a shortage of voting papers, he used his maiden speech to announce his resignation; he lost the subsequent by-election by 15 votes, narrowly lost the seat in the February 1880 general election, but won it in yet another early general election in July 1880. The radical premier, Graham Berry, offered him the position of Attorney-General of Victoria in August, but Deakin turned him down.

As a young politician, Deakin was regarded as a striking figure. He stood about 6 ft (1.8 m) tall, with dark hair and eyes and a handsome, bearded face, and was noted for his rich baritone voice. The National Archives of Australia similarly describes him as "dark, handsome and tall", and notes that his courteous manner later contributed to his nickname, "Affable Alfred".

During the 1880s, Deakin became involved in a number of organisations relating to public affairs, including the National Anti-Sweating League, which opposed oppressive sweatshop labour. Deakin held a range of cabinet posts between March 1883 and November 1890:

- March 1883 – Feb 1886: Commissioner for Public Works and Water Supply
- November 1883 – April 1884: Solicitor-General
- February 1886 – November 1890: Chief Secretary (the most powerful position after the premier and treasurer)
- January – November 1890: Minister for Health
- September – November 1890: Solicitor-General

In 1885 Deakin secured the passage of the colony's pioneering Factories and Shops Act, enforcing regulation of employment conditions and hours of work.

In December 1884 he went to the United States to investigate irrigation, and presented a report in June 1885, Irrigation in Western America. Percival Serle described this report as "a remarkable piece of accurate observation, and was immediately reprinted by the United States government". In June 1886, he introduced legislation to nationalise water rights and provide state aid for irrigation works that helped establish irrigation in Australia.

In 1887 he led Victoria's delegation to the Imperial Conference in London, where he argued forcibly for reduced colonial payments for the defence provided by the British Navy and for improved consultation concerning the New Hebrides. In 1889, he became the member for the Melbourne seat of Essendon and Flemington.

The government was brought down in 1890, over its use of the militia to protect non-union labour during the maritime strike. In addition, Deakin lost his fortune and his father's fortune in the property crash of 1893, and had to return to the bar to restore his finances. In 1892, he unsuccessfully defended the mass murderer Frederick Bailey Deeming and assisted the defence in the 1893–94 libel trial of David Syme.

=== Road to federation ===
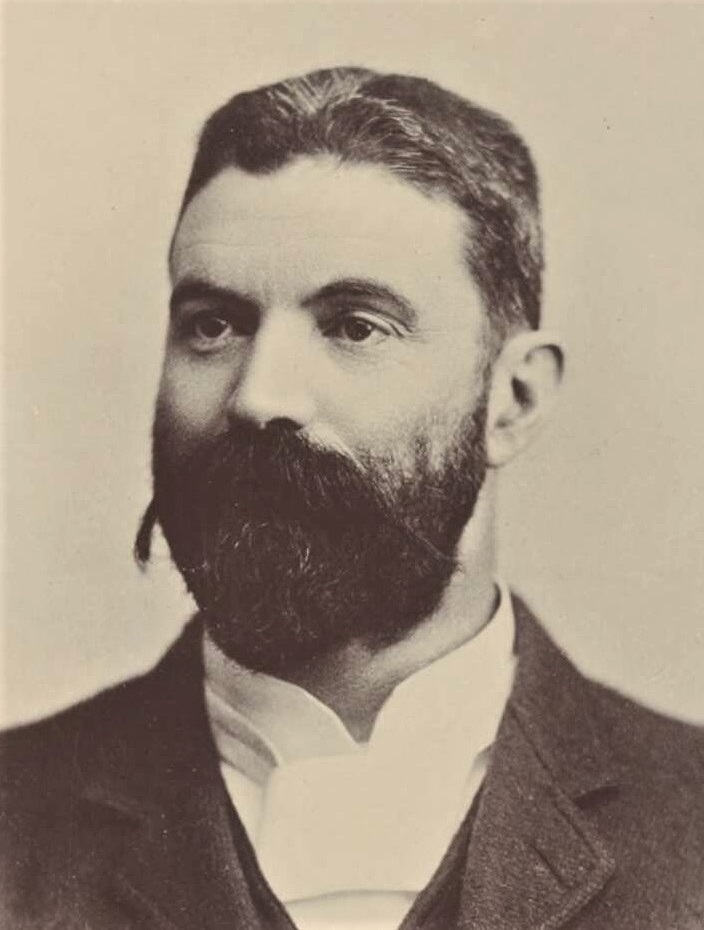
Alfred Deakin in 1898

After 1890, Deakin refused all offers of cabinet posts and devoted his attention to the movement for federation. He was Victoria's delegate to the Australasian Federal Conference, convened by Sir Henry Parkes in Melbourne in 1890, which agreed to hold an intercolonial convention to draft a federal constitution. He was a leading negotiator at the Federal Conventions of 1891, which produced a draft constitution that contained much of the Constitution of Australia, as finally enacted in 1900. Deakin was also a delegate to the second Australasian Federal Convention, which opened in Adelaide in March 1897 and concluded in Melbourne in January 1898. He was somewhat out of sympathy with the tendency of the convention, and sided with the majority in only 55 percent of divisions; fewer occasions than all but five delegates. He supported wide taxation powers for the federal government, successfully opposed conservative plans for the indirect election of senators, and attempted to weaken the powers of the Senate, in particular seeking to prevent it from being able to defeat money bills. He had told the National Australasian Convention of 1891 'To introduce an American Senate into a British constitution is to destroy both'. Deakin often had to reconcile differences and find ways out of apparently impossible difficulties. Between and after these meetings, he travelled through the country addressing public meetings and he was partly responsible for the large majority in Victoria at each referendum.

In 1900 Deakin travelled to London with Edmund Barton and Charles Kingston to oversee the passage of the federation bill through the Imperial Parliament, and took part in the negotiations with Joseph Chamberlain, the Colonial Secretary, who insisted on the right of appeal from the High Court of Australia to the Privy Council. Eventually a compromise was reached, under which constitutional (inter se) matters could be finalised in the High Court, but other matters could be appealed to the Privy Council.

Deakin defined himself as an "independent Australian Briton", favouring a self-governing Australia but loyal to the British Empire. He certainly did not see federation as marking Australia's independence from Britain. On the contrary, Deakin was a supporter of closer empire unity, serving as president of the Victorian branch of the Imperial Federation League, a cause he believed to be a stepping stone to a more spiritual world unity.

=== Attorney-general ===
Photo in 1898 of the future 1st prime minister of Australia, Edmund Barton, and 2nd prime minister of Australia, Alfred Deakin

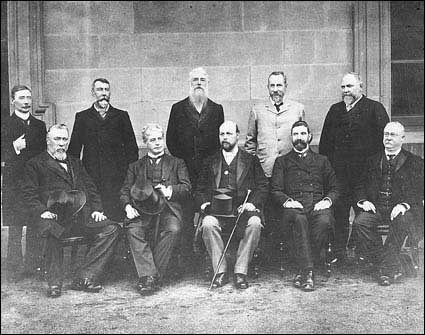
The first and second prime ministers of Australia, Edmund Barton and Alfred Deakin, amongst the 1901 cabinet.

In 1901, Deakin was elected to the first federal Parliament as MP for the Division of Ballaarat, and became Attorney-General of Australia in the ministry headed by Edmund Barton. He was active, especially in drafting bills for the Public Service, arbitration and the High Court. His second reading speech on the Immigration Restriction Bill to implement the White Australia policy was notable for its blatant racism, including arguing that it was necessary to exclude the Japanese because of their good qualities, which would place them at an advantage over European Australians. His March 1902 speech in favour of the bill establishing the High Court of Australia helped overcome significant opposition to its establishment.

Deakin attempted to resign from cabinet in April 1902, writing two letters of resignation to Barton. The primary cause was his opposition to the government's proposed 50% pay rise for MPs, but his wife had also been in poor health. He wrote to Barton that "my retirement will be a relief from a strain which has been severe at times", and hoped to still assist the government as a backbencher. Barton replied that his departure would "break my heart" and "wreck the ministry". He agreed to drop the proposed pay rise and Deakin agreed to continue as a minister.

In May 1902, Barton left the country to attend the coronation of Edward VII and 1902 Colonial Conference. Deakin was acting prime minister of Australia until Barton's return in October 1902. During this time he dealt with the resignation of Governor-general Lord Hopetoun over a salary dispute and conflict with the South Australian government over the external affairs power, which was resolved in favour of the federal government. He also secured the passage of the Customs Tariff 1902, which the Senate had twice returned to the House with a series of proposed amendments. In view of the urgent need for government revenue, Deakin successfully convinced the House and his fellow ministers to accept the amendments, but in a way that avoided setting a new constitutional precedent over money bills.

Deakin continued his efforts to establish a federal judiciary when parliament resumed in May 1903. The government eventually passed a compromise bill, the Judiciary Act 1903, which established a High Court of three judges. Concessions were made on the number of judges (three rather than five) as well as their salary and pension entitlements. In July 1903, Deakin was tasked with securing the passage of the Conciliation and Arbitration Bill which had been drafted by Charles Kingston. He made the second reading speech on the bill at short notice, following Kingston's surprise resignation from cabinet. He argued the bill, which would introduce a compulsory arbitration scheme for industrial disputes, would "bring both employer and employee before the bar of a tribunal which would mete out even-handed justice". However, in early September the government unexpectedly abandoned the bill. The ALP, with the "mischievous support" of the opposition, had passed an amendment extending its provisions to state railway workers, which Deakin regarded as unconstitutional. He received much of the criticism for the decision to withdraw the bill.

== Prime minister, 1903–1904 ==
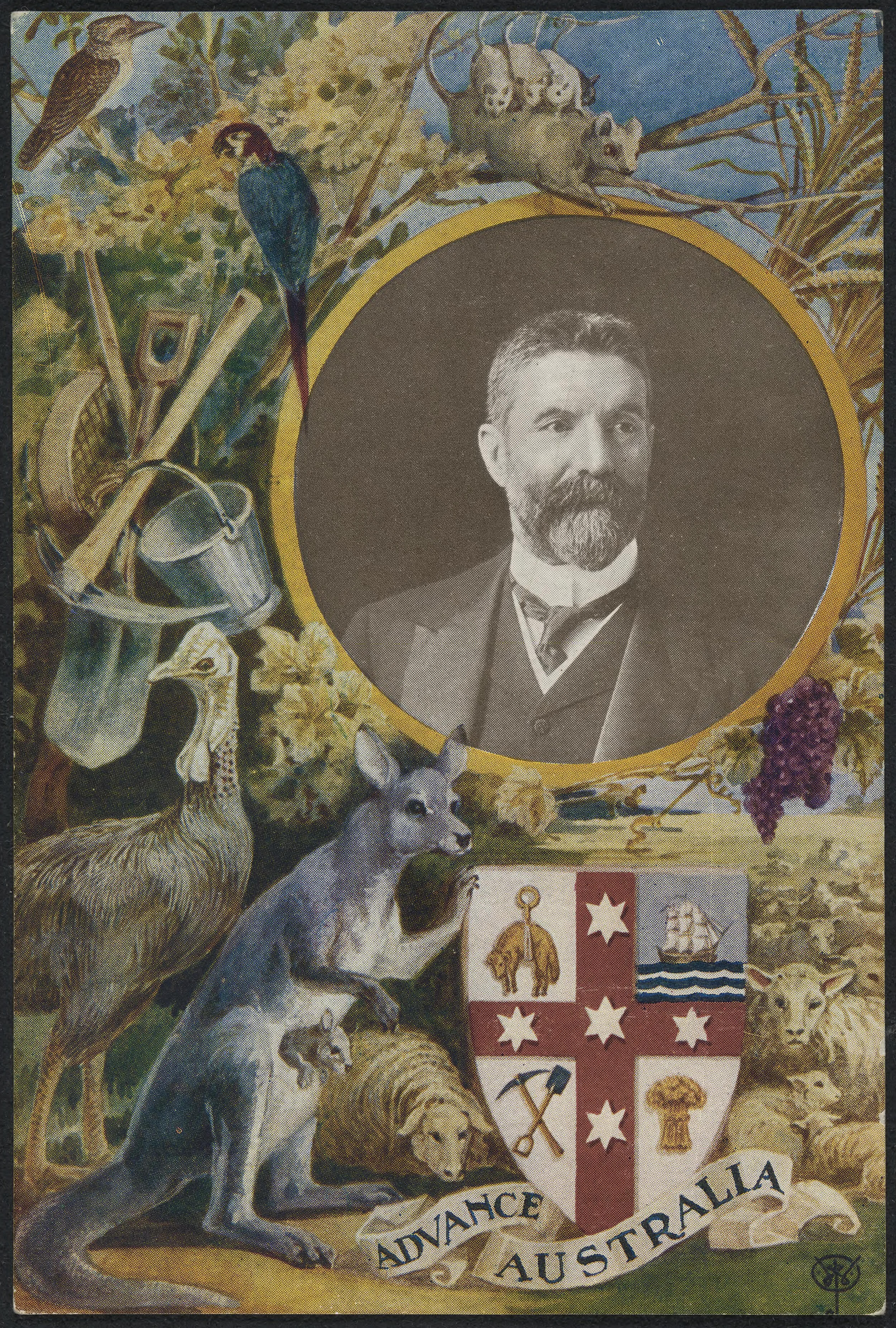
"Advance Australia" postcard, featuring a portrait of Deakin as the incumbent prime minister

After the passage of the Judiciary Act, cabinet began to consider who would fill the newly created seats on the High Court. Encouraged by his colleagues, Barton decided to retire from politics and accept appointment to a puisne justiceship. Deakin was his presumed successor and faced no significant opposition from the government and its supporters. The only obstacle was his own willingness to take on the role, and he expressed doubts about his suitability for the position in diary entries and letters to friends. He seriously considered allowing William Lyne to take over the government, but Lyne proved unable or unwilling to do so. After cabinet confirmed Barton's appointment to the High Court, Deakin was sworn in as prime minister on 24 September 1903 at Government House, Melbourne. He relinquished the attorney-generalship and took on Barton's external affairs portfolio. The new ministry was unchanged apart from the additions of Austin Chapman and Thomas Playford to replace Barton and Richard O'Connor (another High Court appointee). Lyne was given second rank in cabinet.

=== 1903 election and the "three elevens" ===
Parliament was dissolved a month after Deakin took office, with the 1903 Australian federal election called for mid-December. He was the first prime minister to call an early election, to catch his opponents off guard and take advantage of a large number of urban educated female voters who could cast a ballot for the first time.

Deakin outlined the government's platform at a speech in Ballarat on 29 October 1903. He called on voters to unite behind "fiscal peace and preferential trade for a White Australia". The "fiscal peace" to which he referred was an end to conflict over the recently enacted tariff, while "preferential trade" referred to the idea of Imperial Preference, which Deakin hoped would bring Australia closer to Britain and the rest of the Empire. Reid continued to campaign on unrestricted free trade, while the ALP focused on class issues, particularly the need for compulsory arbitration, and was rewarded with large gains in both houses. The final result in the House was an effective three-way tie between Deakin's Liberal Protectionists, Reid's Free Traders, and Chris Watson's Labor Party.

Inspired by the ongoing Ashes series, in a January 1904 speech Deakin used an uncharacteristic sporting analogy to call for the establishment of majority government and a two-party system:

What kind of a game of cricket could you have, if you had three elevens in the field instead of two, and one sometimes played on one side, sometimes on the other, and sometimes for itself?

He went on to call it "absolutely essential" for the three parties to be reduced to two "as soon as possible", although he stated that he was unsure which parties should merge. Deakin's analogy passed into common usage to describe the unstable party system in the first decade after Federation. However, according to Brett (2017) the analogy was imperfect, as realistically the Labor Party and Free Traders would never agree to an alliance; Deakin's party was an obligatory partner in any coalition government.

=== Defeat and resignation ===
Deakin sought to form an "understanding" with the ALP during the parliamentary recess after the election, but made little progress. When parliament resumed in March 1904, he introduced a modified Conciliation and Arbitration Bill, but ignored Labor's requests for its provisions to be extended to state public servants. He believed that the government did not have the constitutional authority to do so, whereas the ALP (and some radicals within his own party) thought the issue should be determined by the High Court. On 22 April, Andrew Fisher moved for the bill to be amended to cover state public servants. The amendment passed by 38 votes to 29, which Deakin treated as a motion of no confidence in his government. He tendered his resignation as prime minister on the same day and was formally succeeded by Watson on 27 April.

Deakin's motivations for relinquishing office have been debated. He was under no obligation to resign, as the ALP had not intended for the amendment to be treated as a confidence motion. It has been suggested he thought forcing Watson into office unprepared would demonstrate the ALP's weakness as a party of government. However, his diaries also suggest he was under considerable personal strain and could have been "simply courting defeat to relieve himself of the burden of office".

== Out of office ==
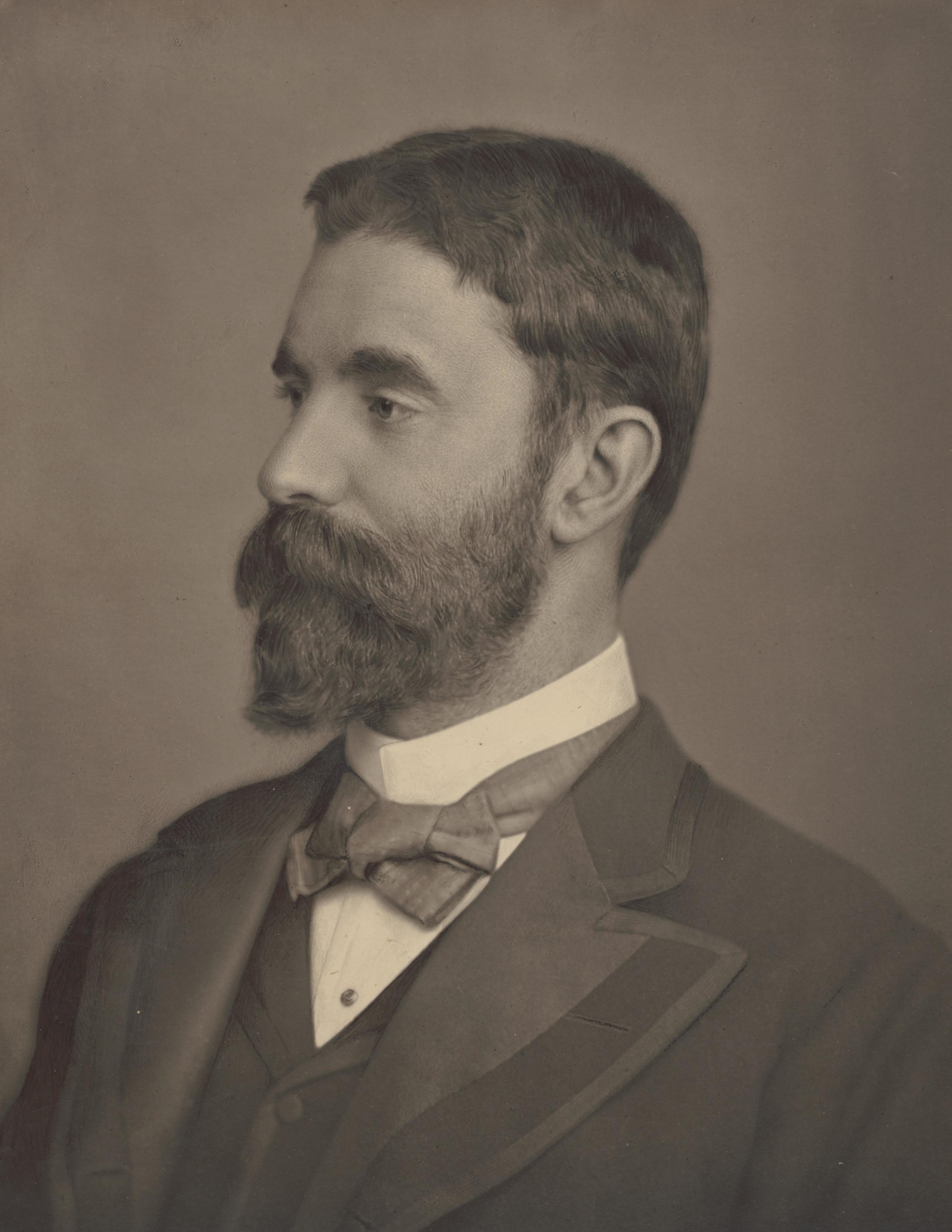
Portrait by Arthur J. Melhuish

Deakin promised to extend "the utmost fair play" to the new Watson government, and allowed H. B. Higgins to join the government as attorney-general. The Liberal Protectionists were divided between radicals seeking an alliance with the ALP and anti-socialists seeking an alliance with the Free Traders; Reid continued as leader of the opposition. Despite the party's lack of a majority, the ALP caucus did not immediately authorise Watson to seek an alliance, and Deakin instead negotiated a draft agreement with the Free Traders in which Reid would become prime minister. Deakin himself would remain party leader but retire to the backbenches, as he did not wish to be bound by cabinet solidarity. The Liberal Protectionists rejected the agreement, according to John Forrest out of reluctance to serve in a ministry Deakin did not lead.

Watson attempted to form an alliance with the Liberal Protectionists in June 1904, but was rebuffed. Deakin felt that the power of the Protectionists would be diminished by Labor's party discipline. He elaborated on his decision-making in an August speech to the National Political League, a newly anti-socialist organisation in Ballarat. His speech did not attack the government on policy grounds but condemned the ALP's principles of caucus solidarity and organisational control over the parliamentary party. He saw himself as a progressive liberal torn between conservative obstructivism on one hand and Labor's materialist collectivism on the other. Two days later The Age, edited by his friend David Syme, published a scathing editorial calling his speech "transcendental musings" and stating he had "lost himself in the clouds amongst politico-philosophical questions" instead of offering substantive leadership. This led to a major falling-out between the two, with Deakin writing to Syme that he had "been more deeply upset by this incident than by any during my political life".

The Watson government fell less than two weeks after Deakin's speech in Ballarat, which may have been taken by Reid as a cue to challenge the status quo. While debating the revived Conciliation and Arbitration Bill, a majority of the Liberal Protectionists joined with the Free Traders in opposing a procedural motion on an amendment. Watson took the vote as a motion of no confidence and resigned. Many ALP members felt betrayed by Deakin, and Billy Hughes accused him of hypocrisy in speeches which he later told Atlee Hunt had been deliberately provocative. Deakin in response made personal attacks on Hughes, comparing him to an "ill-bred urchin one saw dragged from a tart shop kicking, screeching and scratching". He eventually apologised in the House for his reaction. Deakin declined to join the Reid government, but lent his support and encouraged Protectionists (including his former treasurer George Turner) to accept ministerial posts; others within the party joined the crossbench. He and Reid agreed to a "fiscal truce" in which the issue of the tariff would not be raised until the next election.

Deakin maintained an "enigmatic public silence" on the Reid government's actions, particularly during the long parliamentary recess from December 1904 to June 1905. During this time he seriously considered leaving politics. He had been engaged to write monthly anonymous articles for the National Review, in addition to his weekly articles for the Morning Post. However, his primary interest was in religion, particularly the role of the preacher. He met with Salvation Army founder William Booth on a number of occasions, even chairing one of Booth's meetings at the Royal Exhibition Building. In his notebooks he drafted sermons and "weighed the religious against the political life, the preacher against the legislator, and both against the ultimate purpose of existence". (Note: According to Brett (2017): "In the fifteen months between April 1904, when he resigned as prime minister, and July 1905, Deakin produced more than four hundred pages of religious writing: prayers, meditations, journals and devotional poetry, including an exegesis of both the Koran and the Bhagavad Gita.") Late in 1904, Deakin purchased 7 acres (2.8 ha) at Point Lonsdale. He named the property "Ballara" and moved a wooden house onto the land, which served as a holiday home for the rest of his life.

=== "Notice to quit" ===
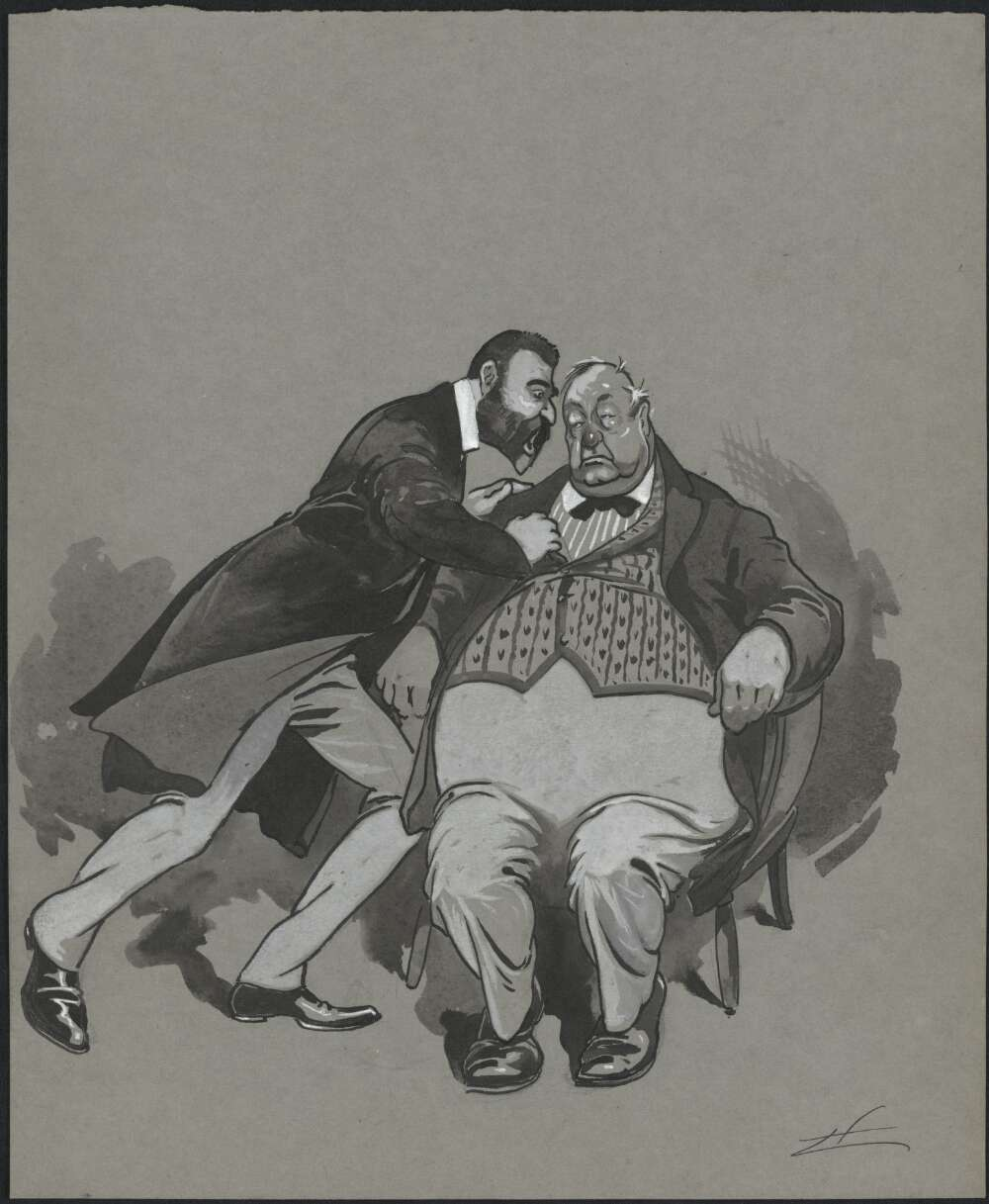
Cartoon of Deakin and Reid by Livingston Hopkins

Deakin's supporters began to lobby him to seek a return to government in 1905. He was reinvigorated by a trip to Western Australia early in the year, where he was struck by the development of the Eastern Goldfields and received encouragement from John Forrest and Austin Chapman. Most importantly, Chris Watson wrote privately that he would have the "active support" of the Labor Party if he resumed office.

On 24 June 1905, the weekend before parliament resumed, Deakin delivered a two-hour speech to his constituents in Ballarat. He claimed the pragmatic middle ground for his party, criticising the policies of Labor and the Free Traders as vague and impractical, and further accused Reid of breaking their fiscal truce. The significance of his address was elevated two days later when The Age stated that "Mr Deakin's Ballarat speech, read in any light, is a notice to Mr Reid to quit". Although Deakin denied that this interpretation was correct, Reid took it to mean he had withdrawn his support and stated as such in parliament. Deakin then successfully moved an amendment to the address-in-reply, while denying it had been premeditated. By convention, this was treated as a motion of no confidence. Reid sought a dissolution and early election, but was refused by the governor-general, Lord Northcote; Deakin was then commissioned to form a new government.

== Prime minister, 1905–1908 ==
=== Domestic policy ===
Deakin resumed office in mid-1905, and retained it for three years. During this, the longest and most successful of his terms as prime minister, his government was responsible for much policy and legislation giving shape to the Commonwealth during its first decade, including bills to create an Australian currency. The Copyright Act 1905 was passed, the Commonwealth Bureau of Census and Statistics was established in 1906, Commonwealth Bureau of Meteorology was established in 1908 and the Quarantine Act 1908 was passed.

In 1906 Deakin's government amended the Judiciary Act to increase the size of the High Court to five judges, as envisaged in the constitution, and appointed Isaac Isaacs and H. B. Higgins to fill the two additional seats. The first protective federal tariff, the Australian Industries Protection Act, was passed. The New Protection program attempted to force companies to pay fair wages by setting conditions for tariff protection, although the Commonwealth had no powers over wages and prices. Deakin believed, as one study put it, “that the state should intervene in human affairs to stimulate Australian manufacturing, to share the fruits of prosperity and to liberate workers from exploitation,” while also believing that the state should ensure that a fair minimum wage rate be paid to all white Australian male workers. In 1906, an Excise Tariff (Agricultural Machinery) Act was introduced that exempted domestic manufacturers from excise duty if (as noted by one study) “they could show they were paying a fair and reasonable wage.”

The Papua Act 1905 established an Australian administration for the former British New Guinea and Deakin appointed Hubert Murray as Lieutenant-Governor of Papua in 1908, who ruled it for a 32-year period as a benevolent paternalist. His government passed a bill for the transfer of control of the Northern Territory from South Australia to the Commonwealth, which became effective in 1911. As prime minister Deakin championed the Seat of Government Act 1904, that had ordained the establishment of the Commonwealth's capital at Dalgety, and vigorously, if unsuccessfully, fought the move to relocate the capital to the Canberra area.

The Bounties Act of 1907 provided for the encouragement of a particular industry together with (as noted by one study) “the refusal or reduction of a bounty if the production of a commodity is not accompanied by the payment to the workers employed in that production of a fair and reasonable rate of wage,” while the Officers’ Compensation Act of 1908 provided compensation to the widows and orphans of deceased Commonwealth officers. In June 1908, the Commonwealth Invalid and Old Age Pensions Act was passed; establishing a Commonwealth-administered system of old age and invalid pensions. Old age pensions commenced in 1909, followed by invalid pensions the following year.

=== Defence and external affairs ===
In December 1907, he introduced the first bill to establish compulsory military service, which was also strongly supported by Labor's Watson and Billy Hughes. He had long opposed the naval agreements to fund Royal Navy protection of Australia although Barton had agreed in 1902 that the Commonwealth would take over such funding from the colonies. In 1906 he announced that Australia would purchase destroyers, and in 1907 travelled to an Imperial Conference in London to discuss the issue, without success. In 1908 he invited Theodore Roosevelt's Great White Fleet to visit Australia, in a symbolic act of independence from Britain. The Surplus Revenue Act of 1908 provided £250,000 for naval expenditure, although these funds were first applied by the Andrew Fisher Labor government, creating the first independent navy in the British empire.

== Fusion ==
In 1908, Deakin was again forced from office by Labor. He then formed a coalition, the "Fusion", with Joseph Cook and the Anti-Socialist Party, and returned to power in May 1909 at the head of Australia's first majority government. The Fusion was seen by many as a betrayal of Deakin's liberal principles, and he was called a "Judas" by Sir William Lyne.

Comparing his party with that of George Reid's, Deakin described his as being the more progressive of the two, declaring during a policy speech in 1906 that “While the Liberal Party stands for all classes of the community, the anti-Liberal Party stands for the privileged classes in defence of vested interests.” Deakin also argued that George Reid's anti-socialism meant, as he put it, “the sacrifice of protection and progressive legislation.” Nevertheless, in May 1908, the Sydney Morning Herald had advocated for Deakin and Joseph Cook to compose their differences. Although Deakin regarded Cook and his men as reactionary, and in January 1909 had expressed his belief to Littleton Groom that (as noted by one historian) "Australia needed a government that was always liberal", he nevertheless agreed to a ‘fusion’ of forces composed of the anti-socialist protectionist conservatives led by John Forrest, his own liberal protectionists and the direct opposition that was led by Joseph Cook. According to one historian, Deakin made more concessions than the other groups when the "Fusion" was agreed to:

Evey group had made concessions, but Deakin seemed to have given away most. He had thrown in the towel over New Protection. He had abandoned the graduated land tax and had thrown away the whole of the welfare programme which had made his party indistinguishable in social policy from the Labor Party.

== Prime minister, 1909–1910 ==
Deakin was sworn in as prime minister for a third time on 2 June 1909. The Third Deakin Ministry contained five first-time appointees, reflecting the need to balance the competing interests within the new party.

In a letter to his sister, Deakin described the legislative achievements of 1909 as "the finest harvest of any session". Acts were passed authorising the creation of a separate Australian coinage, establishing compulsory military training for young men, defining the extent of the future Australian Capital Territory, and creating the office of the Australian High Commissioner to the United Kingdom, Australia's first official diplomatic posting. (Note: In order, the Coinage Act 1909, the Defence Act 1909, the Seat of Government Acceptance Act 1909, and the High Commissioner Act 1909.) Bills were also introduced to create the Inter-State Commission and formalise federal control over the Northern Territory, but were not progressed and were passed by the succeeding ALP government.

Deakin and Forrest negotiated the Financial Agreement of 1909 with the state governments, which distributed surplus federal revenues to the states as per-capita grants and became the model for intergovernmental financial relations. This replaced the interim arrangements provided by Section 87 of the Constitution of Australia. Deakin subsequently sought to enshrine the agreement in the constitution, at the urging of state premiers. This step was seen as unnecessary by many, including within his own party, but a second proposed amendment allowing the federal government to take over state debts was less controversial. Two referendums were held simultaneously with the 1910 federal election, with the state debts amendment being accepted and the surplus revenues amendment being rejected. The Financial Agreement nonetheless remained in place until 1927, and was seen by Deakin as one of his most important accomplishments.

=== Final defeat ===
Deakin did not call an early election, allowing the parliament to run to its maximum permissible length. (Note: The House of Representatives expired by "effluxion of time" on 19 February 1910. This is the only occasion on which the House has been allowed to expire rather than being dissolved by the Governor-General.) He expected a "sweeping victory", anticipating that after being confirmed in office he could complete his legislative agenda, attend the 1911 Imperial Conference and then hand over to a successor. The April 1910 federal election was the first to present a straight choice between two alternative parties. To Deakin's surprise, the ALP won a clear majority, gaining 16 seats in the House and sweeping the Senate. In what he called "the Waterloo of the Liberal Party", many former Protectionists lost their seats, and Deakin himself won by fewer than 500 votes. While there were several factors in Labor's victory, Deakin's perceived hypocrisy in the creation of the Fusion was frequently brought up in the campaign and likely cost the Liberals the votes of many of his former supporters.

== Leader of the Opposition, 1910–1913 ==
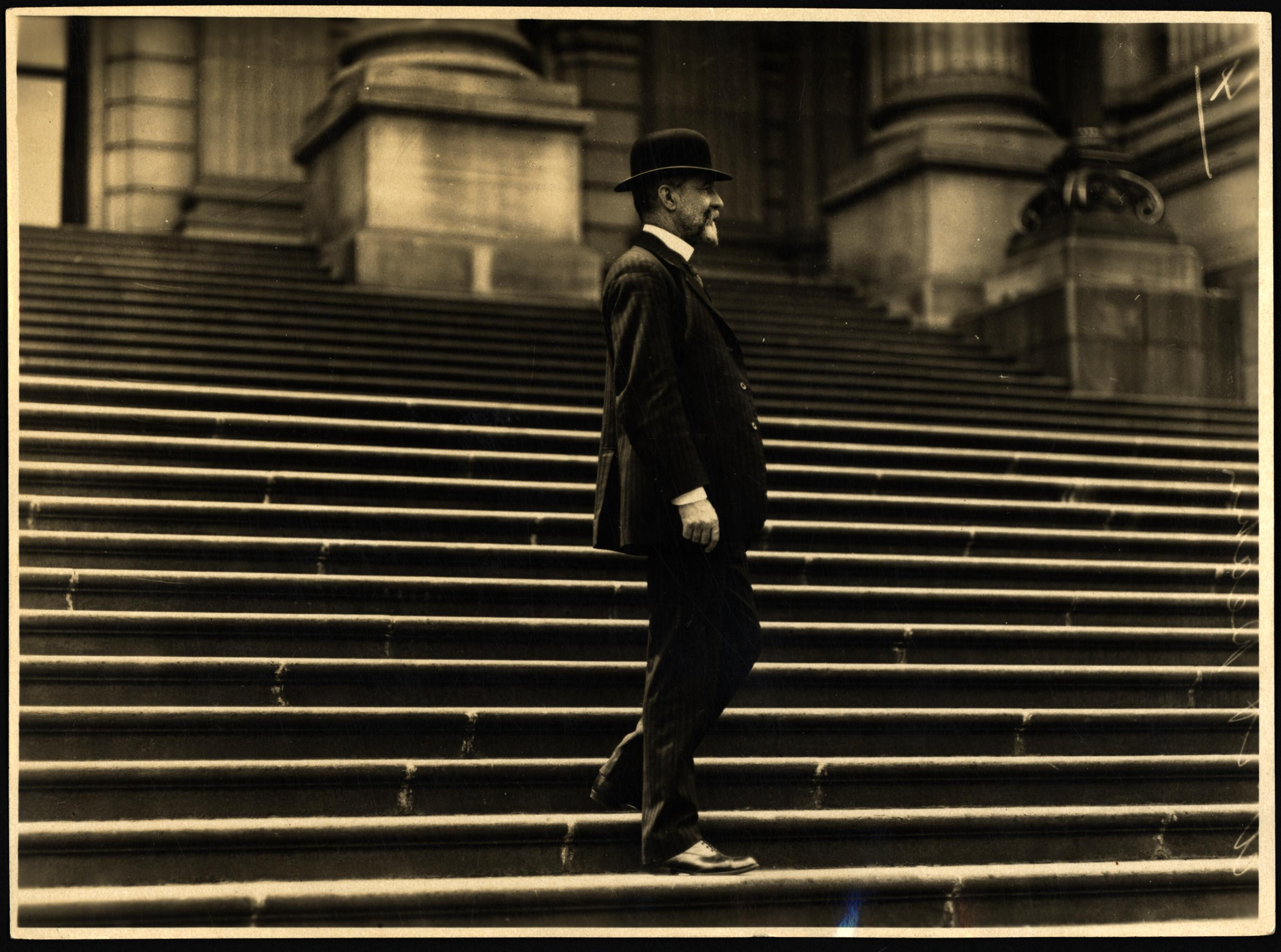
Deakin in January 1913, leaving Parliament House on his final day as Liberal leader

After the 1910 election, Deakin had less influence than any previous opposition leader, with the ALP holding clear majorities in both houses. His diaries indicate that he would have preferred to resign and retire from politics, but he was asked to stay on in the absence of an obvious successor. He led the campaign against the Fisher government's proposed constitutional amendments in 1911, which would have significantly expanded the powers of the federal government. He spent two months campaigning for the "No" vote, visiting every state except Western Australia which turned out to be the only state to vote "Yes". The result was regarded as a triumph for the opposition.

By 1912, Deakin had "lost all zest for public life and was trudging on until he could retire". He made his final speech to parliament on 18 December 1912 and publicly announced his intention to retire on 8 January 1913, after informing Joseph Cook a day earlier. His last action as leader of the Liberal Party was to oversee the election of his successor, held on 20 January. He supported Cook, who defeated John Forrest by a single vote. Deakin retired from parliament at the 1913 federal election held in May, which saw Cook and the Liberals form government with a bare one-seat majority in the House.

== Final years ==
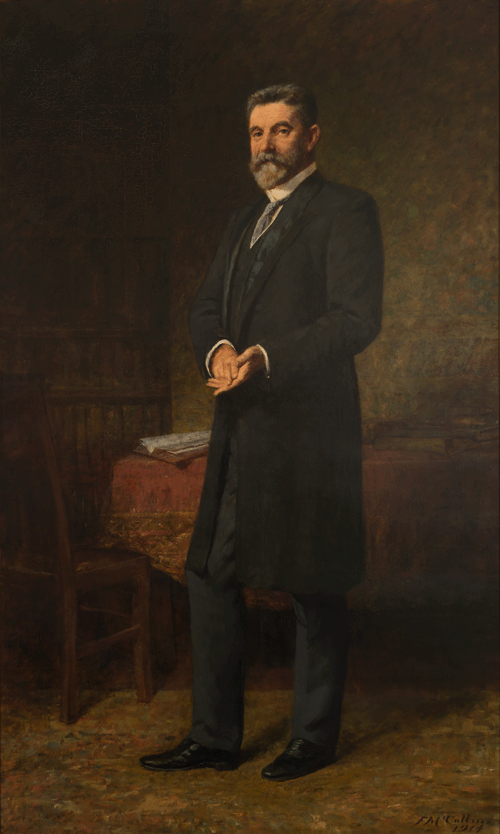
Parliament House portrait of Deakin by Frederick McCubbin, 1914

After the 1913 election, Cook offered Deakin the position of chairman of the Interstate Commission, but he declined. In 1914, following the outbreak of World War I, he did accept a request to chair a royal commission into food supply during the war. Deakin's final public engagement was as leader of the Australian delegation to the 1915 Panama–Pacific International Exposition in San Francisco. He was offered the role initially by Cook and then by Andrew Fisher, who returned as prime minister in September 1914. The appointment was entirely ceremonial and had the support of both Fisher and his deputy Billy Hughes. However, Deakin's involvement was subject to political interference from external affairs minister Hugh Mahon, and he decided on an early return to Australia.

=== Illness and death ===
The final years of Deakin's political career coincided with the early stages of a degenerative neurological condition, with memory loss as the primary feature. In his personal diaries, he meticulously documented his loss of function and increasing anguish at his decline. Other health records suggest he also suffered from chronic hypertension. He had hoped that his symptoms were due to stress and leaving politics would aid his recovery, but instead found that "when I stepped out of Parliament in some mysterious fashion all my memories commenced to die or disappear". Contemporary doctors were unable to give him a clear diagnosis, other than a 1913 opinion of "hyperneurasthenia". Later writers have suggested vascular dementia, early-onset Alzheimer's disease, neurosyphilis, and Vitamin B_{12} deficiency from vegetarianism as possible causes of his illness.

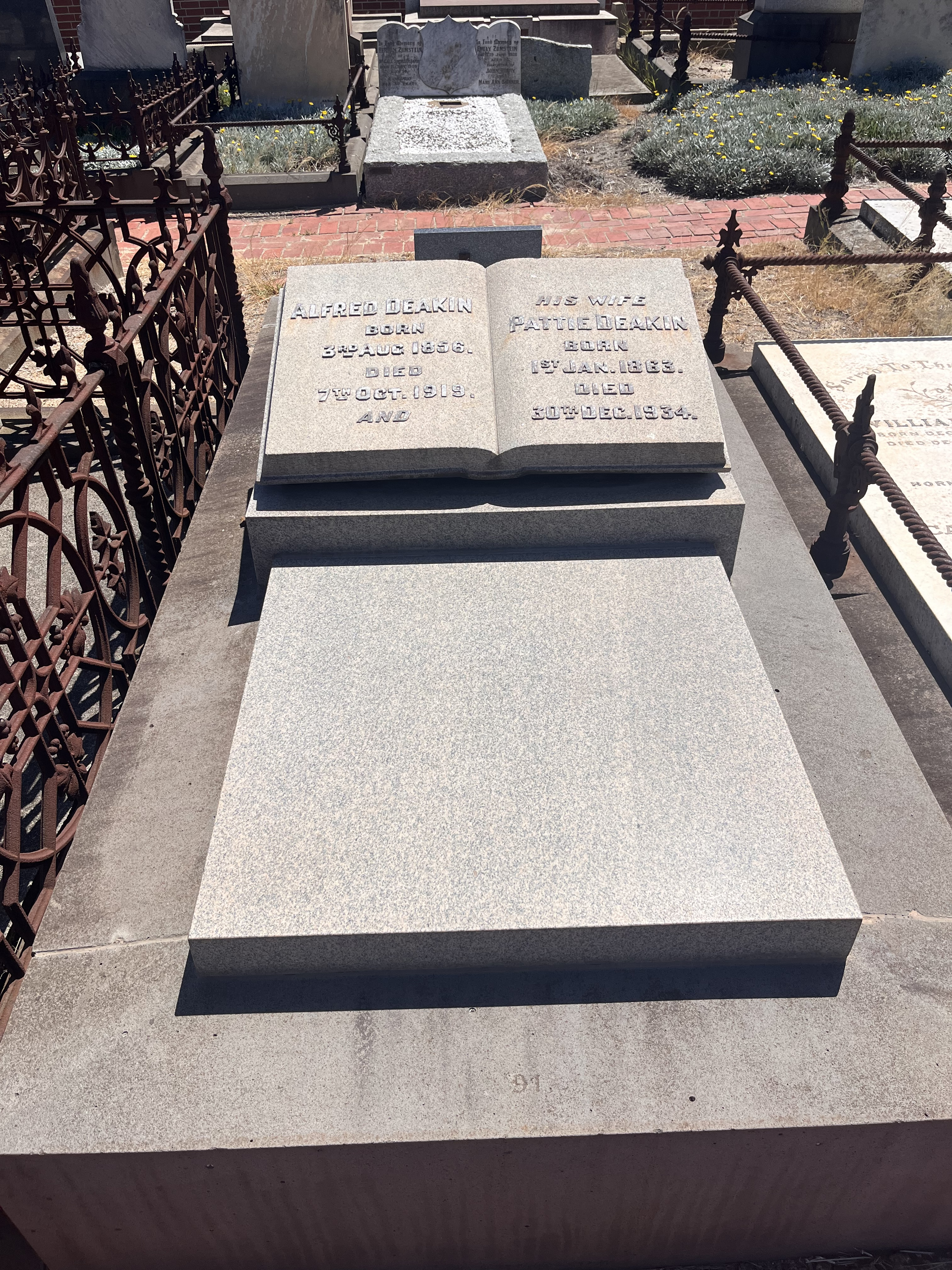
Graves of Alfred and Pattie Deakin at St Kilda Cemetery

In October 1914, Deakin wrote that he had "no continuity of memory or argument" and relied upon "impressions that fade or are forgotten in a few minutes and often in a few seconds". In November 1915, he wrote that he could remember what he had read for only a few hours and that "no collapse could be ghastlier". The following month, he wrote that "I have now become a mere juggler with myself [...] my helpless attempts to read the riddle of my mind and thought must be frankly abandoned". At her urging, Deakin and his wife left Australia in September 1916 to seek advice from specialists in England and the United States, and also to visit their daughter Vera in London. They returned to Australia in early 1917, after which he was generally confined to his home in South Yarra and only saw family members.

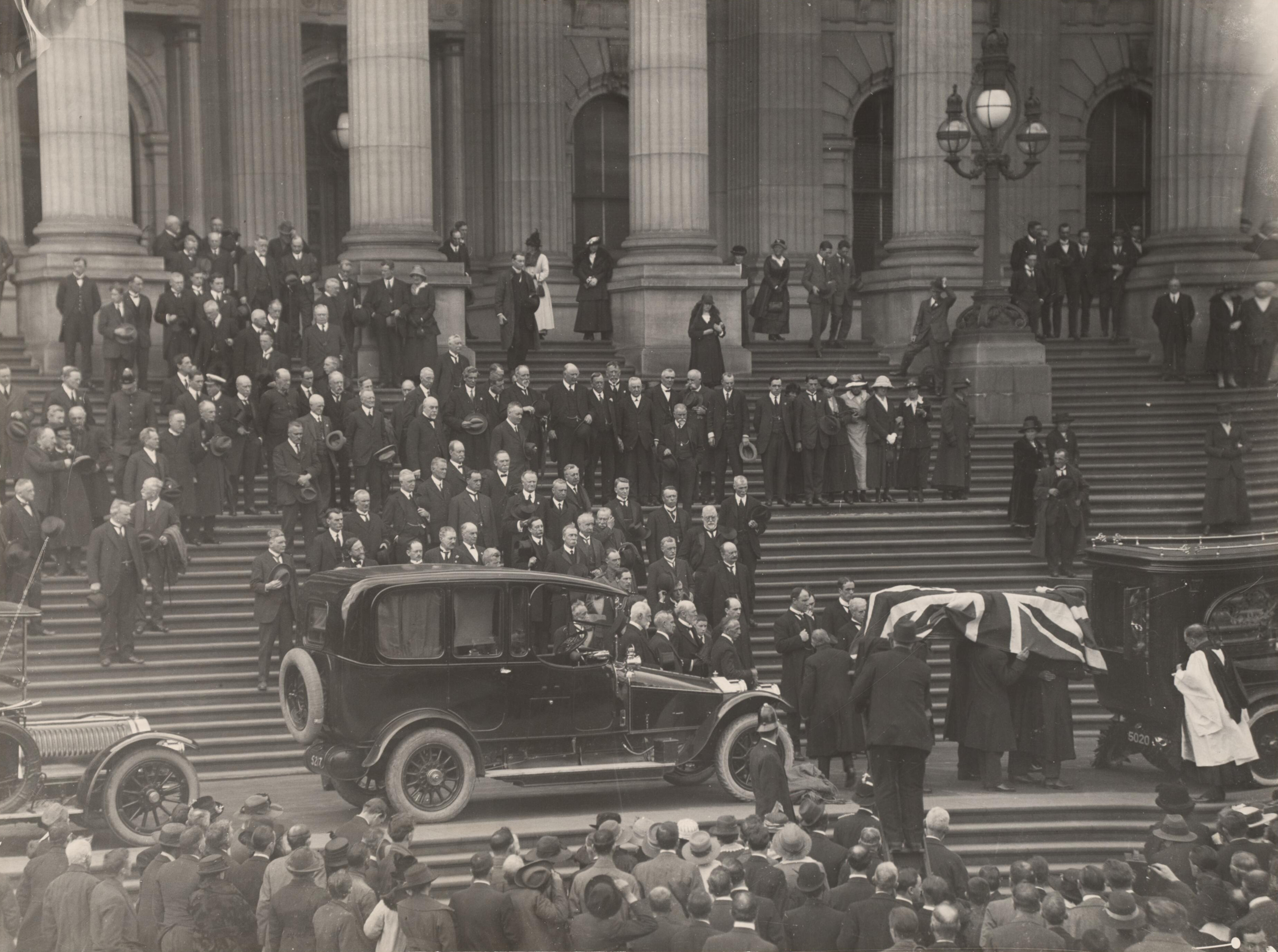
Deakin's funeral procession leaving Parliament House, Melbourne

Deakin died at his home on 7 October 1919, aged 63. His official cause of death was given as meningoencephalitis. He was granted a state funeral at Queen's Hall in Parliament House, Melbourne, after a period lying in state. He was interred next to his parents in the non-denominational section of St Kilda Cemetery, joined by his widow Pattie following her death in 1934.

== Journalism ==
In his youth, Deakin published Quentin Massys, a drama in five acts. Deakin attempted to burn the prints. However some survived and the play was reprinted 1940, as an example of Australian verse.

Deakin continued to write prolifically throughout his career. He was a member of the Eclectic Association; fellow members included authors Theodore Fink, Arthur Topp, Arthur Patchett Martin and David Mickle. Deakin wrote anonymous political commentaries for the London Morning Post even while he was prime minister. His account of the federation movement appeared as The Federal Story in 1944 and is a vital primary source for this history. His account of his career in Victorian politics in the 1880s was published as The Crisis in Victorian Politics in 1957. His collected journalism was published as Federated Australia in 1968.

== Spirituality ==
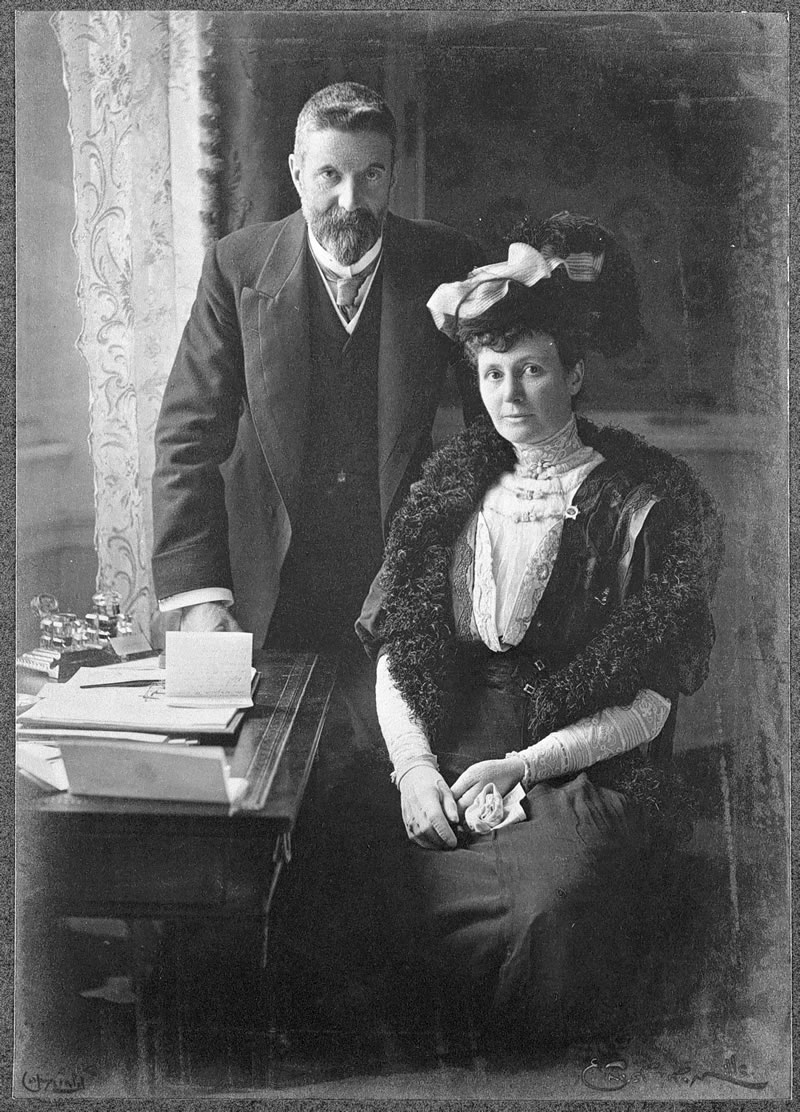
Alfred Deakin and wife Pattie in 1907

He was active in the Theosophical Society until 1896, when he resigned on joining the Australian Church led by Charles Strong.

Though Deakin always took pains to obscure the spiritual dimensions of his character from the public gaze, he felt a strong sense of providence and destiny working in his career. Like Dag Hammarskjöld much later, Deakin's sincere longing for spiritual fulfilment led him to express a sense of unworthiness in his private diaries, which mingled with his literary aspirations as a poet.

His private prayer diaries, like those of Samuel Johnson, express a profound contemplative (though more ecumenical) Christian view of the importance of humility in seeking divine assistance with his career. "A life, the life of Christ", Deakin wrote, "that is the one thing needful – the only revelation required is there... We have but to live it." In 1888, as an example relevant to his work for Federation, Deakin prayed: "Oh God, grant me that judgment & foresight which will enable me to serve my country – guide me and strengthen me, so that I may follow & persuade others to follow the path which shall lead to the elevation of national life & thought & permanence of well-earned prosperity – give me light & truth & influence for the highest & the highest only." As Walter Murdoch pointed out, "[Deakin] believed himself to be inspired, and to have a divine message and mission."

Historian Manning Clark, whose History of Australia cites extensively from his studies of Deakin's private diaries in the National Library of Australia, wrote: "By reading the world's scriptures and mystics a deep peace had settled far inside [Deakin]: now he felt a 'serenity at the core of my heart.' He wanted to know whether participation in the world's affairs would disturb that serenity... he was tormented by the thought that the emptiness of the man within corresponded with the emptiness of society at large where Mammon had found a new demesne to infest."

Deakin processed a deep spiritual conviction and read widely on the subject. His daughter Vera Deakin (Lady White) said in a 1960 ABC radio interview "He had tremendously deep religious views, I'm sure of that. He read to us on Sundays from the Bible, from great preachers, and he was deeply, always deeply conscious of being, as he put it, a tool for providence to work through. Any powers he had he felt he owed to the divine one and it was not his doing."

== Personal life ==
In 1882, Deakin married Elizabeth Martha Anne ("Pattie") Browne, daughter of a well-known spiritualist. They lived with Deakin's parents until 1887, when they moved to "Llanarth", in Walsh Street, South Yarra. The couple had three daughters:

- Ivy (1883–1970) married businessman Herbert Brookes. Their children were:
  - Wilfred Deakin Brookes (1906–1997) – businessman and RAAF officer
  - Jessie Deakin Clarke (1914–2014) – social worker, married Tony Clarke, son of Sir Frank Clarke
  - Alfred Deakin Brookes (1920–2005) – first head of the Australian Secret Intelligence Service
- Stella (1886–1976) married scientist Sir David Rivett.
  - Rohan Deakin Rivett (1917–1977) - journalist, author, newspaper editor and POW.
- Vera (1891–1978) married politician Sir Thomas White.

== Legacy ==
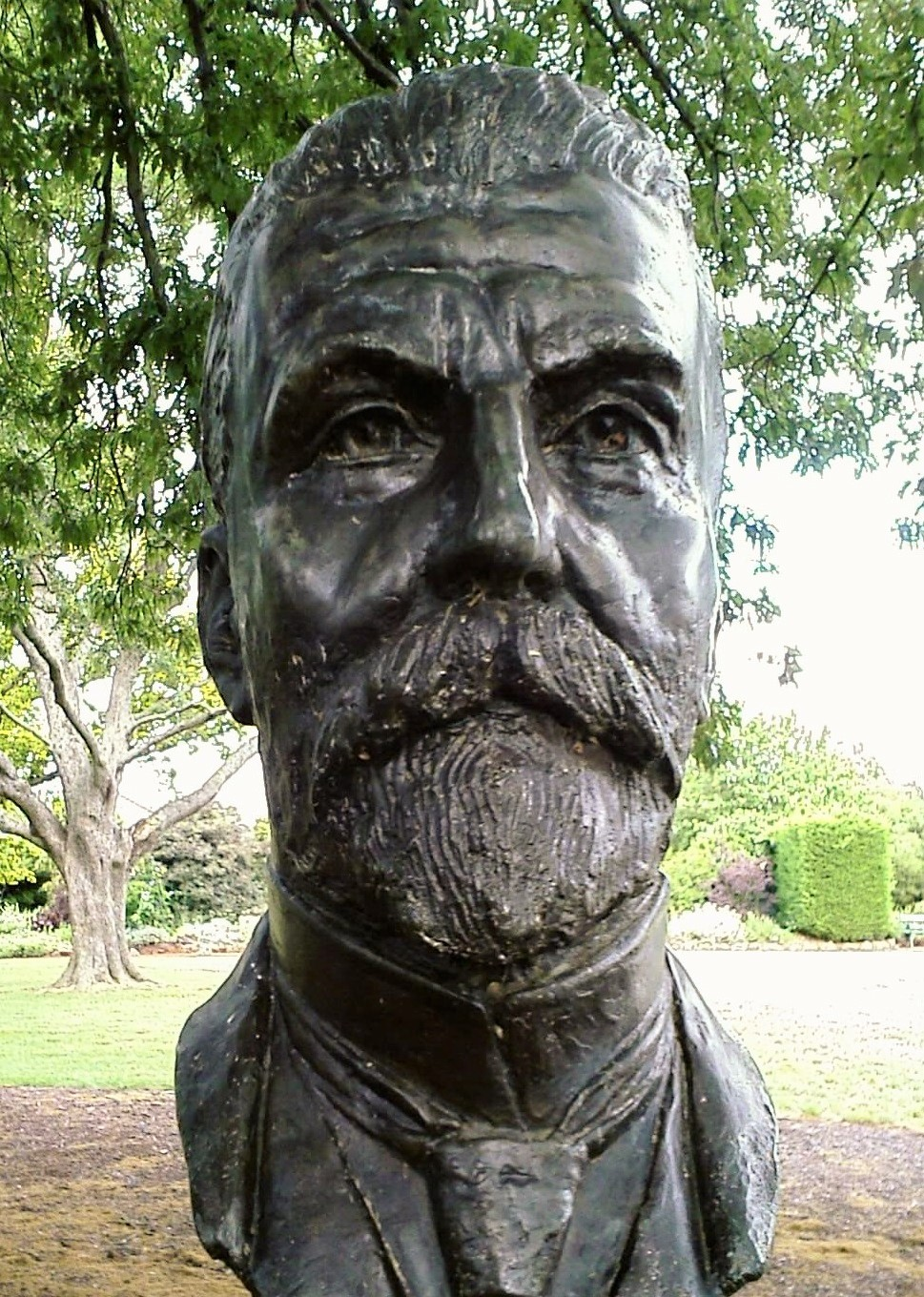
Bust of Alfred Deakin by sculptor Wallace Anderson in Prime Ministers Avenue in the Ballarat Botanical Gardens

Deakin was almost universally liked, admired and respected by his contemporaries, who called him "Affable Alfred". He made his only real enemies at the time of the Fusion, when not only Labor but also some liberals such as Sir William Lyne reviled him as a traitor. He is regarded as a founding father by the modern Liberal Party of Australia.

His life was dramatised in the 1951 play Tether a Dragon by Kylie Tennant.

The Alfred Deakin Prize for an Essay Advancing Public Debate a literary prize (now defunct), was created in his honour.

== Honours ==
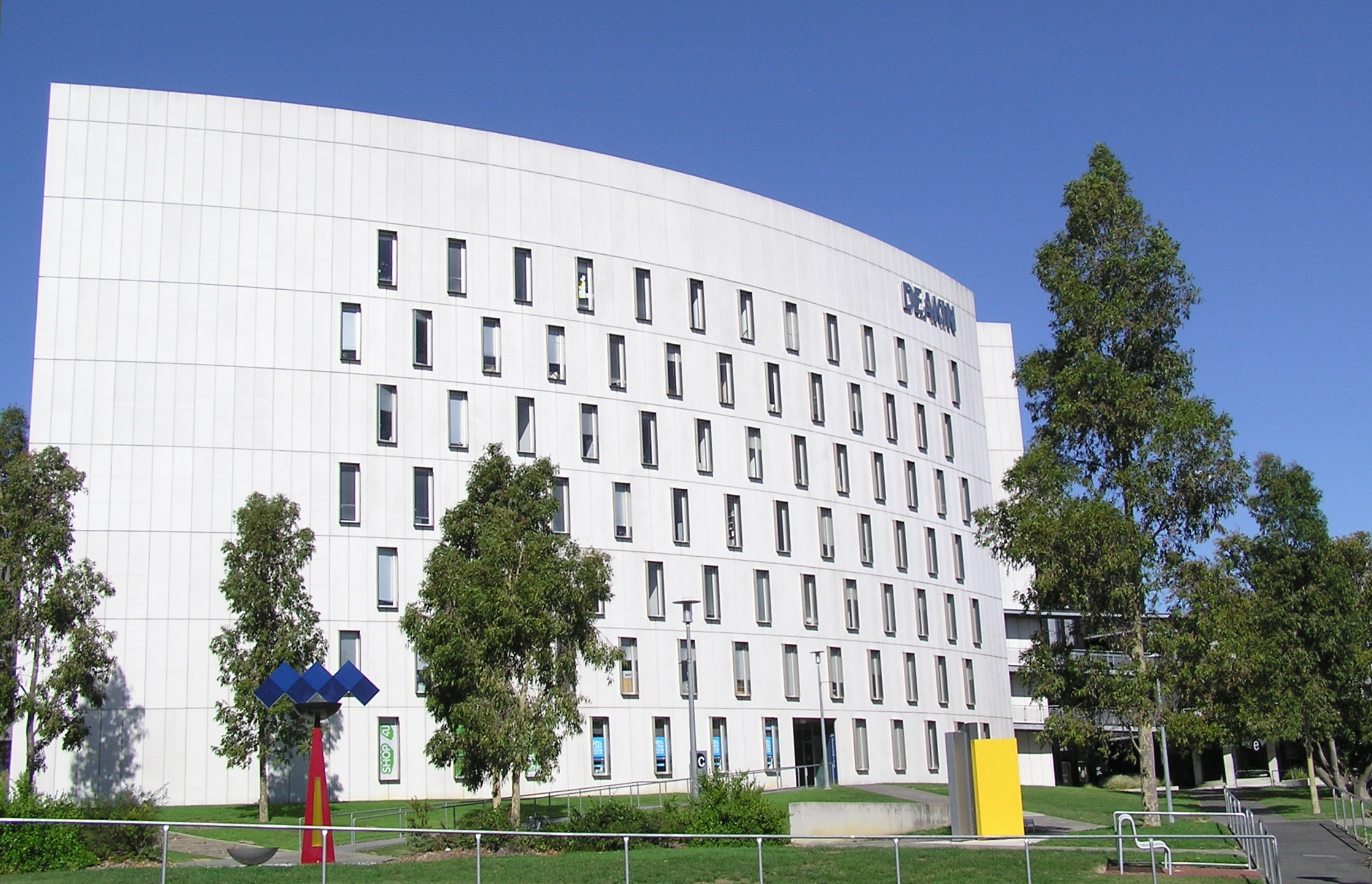
Deakin University is named after Alfred Deakin.

Deakin generally rejected honours during his lifetime. He was first offered a knighthood at the 1887 Colonial Conference, aged 30, but declined to accept. On three separate occasions – in 1900, 1907, and 1913 – he refused appointment to the Privy Council, which would have entitled him to be styled "The Right Honourable". His refusal was "singular, indeed unique, among Australian politicians of comparable prominence". Except for Chris Watson, who was never offered the appointment, Deakin was the only Australian prime minister not to be a privy counsellor until Gough Whitlam refused appointment in the 1970s. He also refused to accept any honorary degrees as prime minister, believing they should only be awarded based on academic prowess. He rejected honorary Doctor of Civil Law degrees from the University of Oxford in 1900 and 1907, and an honorary Doctor of Laws degree from the University of Cambridge in 1912. Deakin generally only accepted honours when he believed it would advance Australian interests, or if rejection could be taken as an insult. While visiting England as prime minister in 1907, he was made an honorary freeman of the cities of London and Edinburgh and an honorary bencher of Gray's Inn. The one honorary degree he did accept was from the University of California in 1915, when he was representing Australia at the Panama–Pacific International Exposition.

Since Deakin's death, several places have been named in his honour. Educational institutions that bear his name include Melbourne's Deakin University, Canberra's Alfred Deakin High School, Deakin House at Melbourne Grammar School, and Deakin Hall at Monash University. He is one of only two prime ministers to have a university named in his honour, along with John Curtin (Curtin University).

Other places named after Deakin include the suburb of Deakin in Canberra, Australian Capital Territory, and the Division of Deakin in the House of Representatives, located in Melbourne's eastern suburbs. In 1969, Australia Post honoured him on a postage stamp bearing his portrait.

== Bibliography ==
- Deakin, Alfred (1875). Quentin Massys: A Drama in Five Acts. Melbourne: J.P. Donaldson.
- Deakin, Alfred (1877). A New Pilgrim's Progress. Melbourne: Terry, Melbourne.
- Deakin, Alfred (1885). Irrigation in Western America, so Far as It Has Relation to the Circumstances of Victoria. Melbourne: Government Printer, Melbourne.
- Deakin, Alfred (1893). Irrigated India: An Australian View of India and Ceylon, Their Irrigation and Agriculture. London: W. Thacker & Co.
- Deakin, Alfred (1893). Temple and Tomb in India. Melbourne: Melville, Mullen and Slade.
- Deakin, Alfred (1999) [1923]. Walter Murdoch, ed. Alfred Deakin: A Sketch. Bookman Press Pty. ISBN 1 86395 385 X.
- Deakin, Alfred (1944). Brookes, Herbert, ed. (later editions edited by J.A. La Nauze [1963] and Stuart Macintyre [1995]). The Federal Story: The Inner History of the Federal Cause. Melbourne: Robertson & Mullens.
- Deakin, Alfred (1957). La Nauze, J. A. and Crawford, R. M., eds. The Crisis in Victorian Politics, 1879–1881. Melbourne: Melbourne University Press.
- Deakin, Alfred (1968). La Nauze, J. A., ed. Federated Australia: Selections from Letters to the Morning Post 1900–1910. Melbourne: Melbourne University Press.
- Deakin, Alfred and Murdoch, Walter (1974). La Nauze, J. A. and Nurser, Elizabeth, eds. Walter Murdoch and Alfred Deakin on Books and Men: Letters and Comments, 1900–1918. Melbourne: Melbourne University Press. ISBN 0-522-84056-6.

== See also ==
- Deakin University – Public university in Melbourne, Australia
- First Deakin Ministry
- Second Deakin Ministry
- Third Deakin Ministry
- List of people who have declined a British honour
- List of prime ministers of Australia

== Notes ==
Parliament of Victoria
Preceded by John Smith	Member for West Bourke; 1879	Succeeded by Robert Harper
Preceded by Robert Harper	Member for West Bourke; 1880–1889	District abolished
New district	Member for Essendon and Flemington; 1889–1901	Succeeded by Edward Warde
Parliament of Australia
New division	Member for Ballaarat; 1901–1913	Succeeded by Charles McGrath
Political offices
New title	Attorney-General of Australia; 1901–1903	Succeeded by James Drake
Preceded by Edmund Barton	Prime Minister of Australia; 1903–1904	Succeeded by Chris Watson
Preceded by Edmund Barton	Minister for External Affairs; 1903–1904	Succeeded by Billy Hughes
Preceded by George Reid	Prime Minister of Australia; 1905–1908	Succeeded by Andrew Fisher
Preceded by George Reid	Minister for External Affairs; 1905–1908	Succeeded by Lee Batchelor
Preceded by Joseph Cook	Leader of the Opposition of Australia; 1909	Succeeded by Andrew Fisher
Preceded by Andrew Fisher	Prime Minister of Australia; 1909–1910	Succeeded by Andrew Fisher
Preceded by Andrew Fisher	Leader of the Opposition of Australia; 1910–1913	Succeeded by Joseph Cook
Party political offices
Preceded by Edmund Barton	Leader of the Protectionist Party; 1903–1909	Party disbanded
New political party	Leader of the Commonwealth Liberal Party; 1909–1913	Succeeded by Joseph Cook
