= Jessie Clarke =

Australian social worker and refugee advocate (1914–2014)

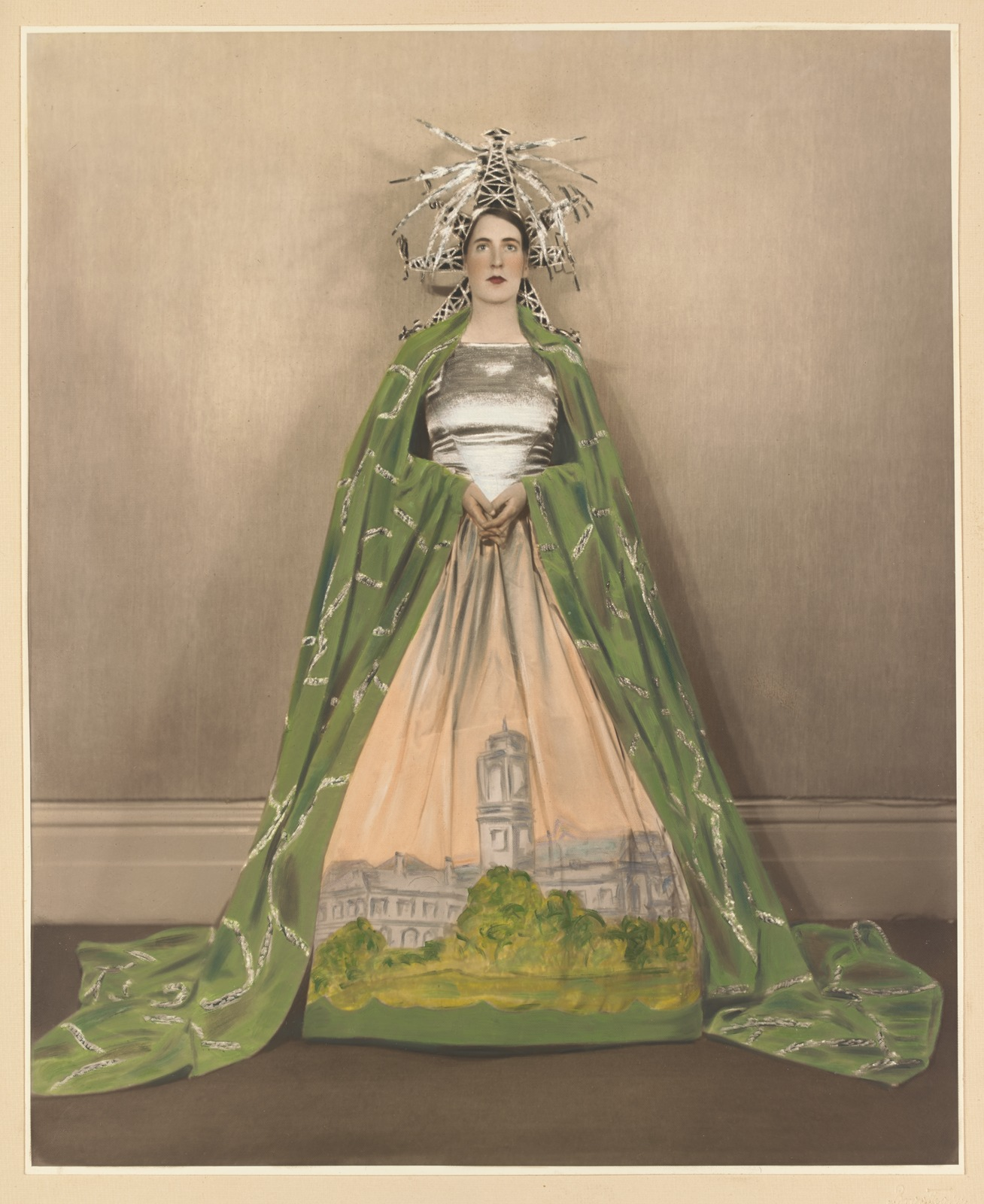
- Jessie Clark dressed for the centenary of Victoria celebrations in 1935
- Born: Jessie Deakin Brookes; 28 December 1914
- Died: 11 November 2014 (aged 99)
- Education: University of Melbourne
- Parents: Herbert Brookes (father); Ivy Brookes (mother)
- Relatives: Alfred Deakin (grandfather); Pattie Deakin (grandmother)

Jessie Deakin Clarke, OAM (née Brookes; 28 December 1914 – 11 November 2014) was an Australian social worker, welfare officer, and refugee advocate.

== Early life ==
Clarke was the daughter of Ivy and Herbert Brookes, and granddaughter of Australian prime minister Alfred Deakin. Her father was a businessman, philanthropist, and activist who served as president of the Victorian Chamber of Manufactures. Her mother Ivy was a gifted musician, active with national and international councils of women and Melbourne Women's Hospital. Clarke completed an Arts/Social Work degree at the University of Melbourne, where her mother served on several faculty boards, before doing further studies in New York.

In 1934, at just twenty years old, Clarke wore a spectacular costume representing the State of Victoria in 'The Pageant of Nations', as part of the Centenary of Victoria, a celebration of European arrival in Victoria. The pageant was an initiative of the International Club of Victoria led by Clarke's mother, Ivy. The celebrations featured a visit from Prince Henry, Duke of Gloucester. Clarke's dress was designed by Thelma Thomas, painted with scenes of Melbourne, with a cloak representing the State's irrigation scheme, and a headdress representing the Yallourn Power Station. The headdress and bodice were destroyed in the Ash Wednesday fires of 1983, and in 1998 she donated the hand-painted skirt, two hooped petticoats, and the green velvet cloak to the State Library Victoria.

== Career ==
While in New York, Clarke was offered a position by the Australian Government as junior delegate to the League of Nations Union in Geneva.

Clarke returned to Melbourne in 1938. She was a welfare officer with the Victorian International Refugee Emergency Council when Sir Frank Clarke made negative comments about Jewish "rat-faced refugees" when addressing the Australian Women's National League, and she took him to task for his remarks. A few months later she married his son, William Anthony Francis Clarke, just after the outbreak of the Second World War. Clarke worked as a voluntary social worker with the Lord Mayor's Patriotic and Welfare Fund, helping with the issues of army wives and relatives in Sydney, and later in Melbourne, where her husband was stationed.

=== Nappie Wash ===
Jessie and William Clarke, along with Mary Adam and Harold Moran, started a napkin wash service in 1946 in response to the post war baby boom. The company's goal was to help overburdened mothers in washing the nappies of their babies. The company went on to become the first successful nappy wash service in Australia, and the second largest such service in the world.

== Awards ==
Clarke was awarded a Medal of the Order of Australia in the 1997 Australia Day Honours in recognition of her "service to community health and welfare organisations over many years."
