= Alfred Deakin Brookes =

First director-general of the Australian Secret Intelligence Service

1st Director-General of the Australian Secret Intelligence Service
- In office 13 May 1952 – 1957
- Prime Minister: Robert Menzies
- Minister: Richard Casey
- Preceded by: Position established
- Succeeded by: Ralph Harry

Personal details
- Born: 11 April 1920 Melbourne, Victoria, Australia
- Died: 19 June 2005 (aged 85)
- Parents: Herbert Brookes (father); Ivy Brookes (mother)
- Relatives: Alfred Deakin (grandfather); Wilfred Deakin Brookes (brother)
- Occupation: Intelligence officer; Public servant

Military service
- Allegiance: Australia
- Branch/service: Second Australian Imperial Force
- Rank: Captain
- Unit: Allied Intelligence Bureau
- Battles/wars: Second World War

Alfred Deakin Brookes (11 April 1920 – 19 June 2005) was the first head of the Australian Secret Intelligence Service, the intelligence agency of the Australian government that collects foreign intelligence. He was appointed in 1952 by Robert Menzies the prime minister at that time.

== Early life ==
Brookes was the youngest son of Ivy (née Deakin) and Herbert Brookes. His father was a prominent businessman and philanthropist, while his mother was the daughter of Alfred Deakin, the second Prime Minister of Australia. He had two older siblings, Jessie and Wilfred. Between 1929 and 1930 he lived with his family in Washington as his father was the Commissioner-General to the United States.

== Military and intelligence career ==
During the Second World War, Brookes enlisted in the Second Australian Imperial Force in Melbourne and was allocated the service number VX112158. He was a lieutenant in the Australian Army, and worked at the Allied Intelligence Bureau in Melbourne. He was the Chief of the Army section in the Far Eastern Liaison Office, which was also known as the Military Propaganda Section or section D.

Brookes lobbied the Menzies government to set up an intelligence organisation in Australia similar to MI6 (the Secret Intelligence Service in the United Kingdom). Richard Casey — the Minister for External Affairs — agreed, and Brookes became the first Director-General of the Australian Secret Intelligence Service until 1957 when he departed public office to work in the private sector.

== Later career and interests ==
He established the Pacific Institute, a discussion forum that brought together representatives from government, business and academia. He was also founding Chairman of the British security company Control Risks Pacific.

== Honours ==
Brookes maintained and promoted links to Chile and was recognised with the Gran Official of Bernardo O'Higgins, the highest award to a non-Chilean.

He named a street "Brookes Street" in Point Lonsdale, Victoria, when he subdivided land which had belonged to his father, Herbert Brookes, into a housing estate.
