= Liberal Party (Australia, 1909) =

Former political party in Australia

- Leader: Alfred Deakin (1909–1913); Joseph Cook (1913–1916)
- Founders: Alfred Deakin; Joseph Cook; George Reid; John Forrest
- Founded: 25–27 May 1909; 117 years ago
- Dissolved: February 1917; 109 years ago
- Merger of: Protectionist; Anti-Socialist
- Merged into: Nationalist
- Ideology: Liberalism (Australian); Conservatism (Australian)
- Political position: Centre-right
- National affiliation: Liberal Union
- Associated bodies: NSW; Qld; SA; Tas; Vic; WA

The Liberal Party was a parliamentary party in Australian federal politics between 1909 and 1917. The party was founded under Alfred Deakin's leadership as a merger of the Protectionist Party and Anti-Socialist Party, an event known as the Fusion.

The creation of the party marked the emergence of a two-party system, replacing the unstable multi-party system that arose after Federation in 1901. The first three federal elections produced hung parliaments, with the Protectionists, Free Traders, and Australian Labor Party (ALP) forming a series of minority governments. Free Trade leader George Reid envisioned an anti-socialist alliance of liberals and conservatives, rebranding his party accordingly, and his views were eventually adopted by his Protectionist counterpart Deakin. Objections towards Reid saw Deakin take the lead in coordinating the merger. The Fusion was controversial, with some of Deakin's radical supporters regarding it as a betrayal and choosing to sit as independents or join the ALP.

The new party formed Australia's first federal majority government and allowed Deakin to return for a third term as prime minister. However, it lost the 1910 election to the ALP in a landslide and had little electoral success thereafter, winning a majority in the House of Representatives only once and never in the Senate. Following the ALP split over conscription in 1916, Deakin's successor Joseph Cook led the Liberals into an alliance with Prime Minister Billy Hughes' new National Labor Party. The two parties formally merged under Hughes' leadership a few months before the 1917 federal election, with the resulting Nationalist Party becoming the new primary opponent of the ALP in the two-party system.

Unlike the ALP, the Liberal Party did not have a single external organisation supporting the parliamentary party and had only loose links with equivalent parties at state level. Deakin attempted to form a national organisation under the name "Commonwealth Liberal Party", but it failed to spread beyond Victoria. In each state various similar bodies were created to endorse candidates and provide campaign financing, while the party also enjoyed the support of pre-existing organisations like the Australian Women's National League. The "Liberal" identity was retained by some state parties after 1917 and revived by Nationalist breakaways in the 1920s, eventually being re-adopted by the modern Liberal Party of Australia.

According to future prime minister John Howard, the creation of the Liberal Party established what he called “the basic dividing line in Australian politics” between the centre-left Australian Labor Party and various centre-right parties.

== History ==
=== Background ===
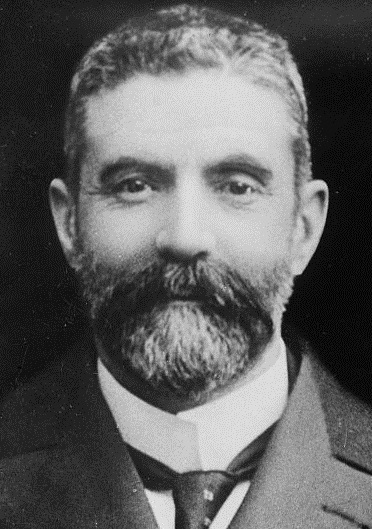
Alfred Deakin, Prime Minister of Australia 1903–1904, 1905–1908 (Protectionist Party), 1909–1910 (Liberal)

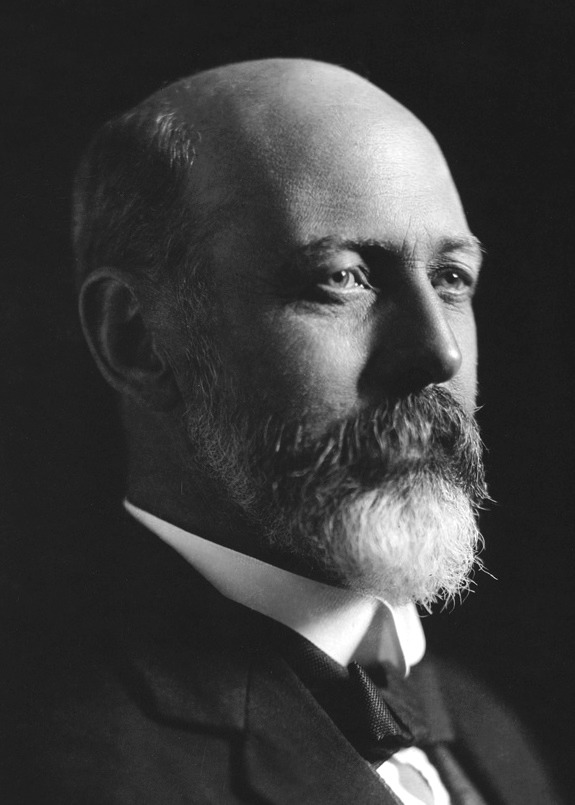
Joseph Cook, Prime Minister of Australia 1913–1914

George Reid adopted a strategy of trying to reorient the party system along Labour vs non-Labour lines – prior to the 1906 election, he renamed his Free Trade Party to the Anti-Socialist Party. Reid envisaged a spectrum running from socialist to anti-socialist, with the Protectionist Party in the middle. This attempt struck a chord with politicians who were steeped in the Westminster tradition and regarded a two-party system as very much the norm.

=== Foundation ===
The Liberal Party was founded between three conferences on 25–27 May 1909. The party was a merger, or Fusion, of the Protectionist Party and Anti-Socialist Party. These parties, although sharing different ideologies and policies, merged to form a single non-Labor opposition. The party merger was voted with few in attendance opposing it. The most prominent opponent was William Lyne. Alfred Deakin was voted leader unanimously.

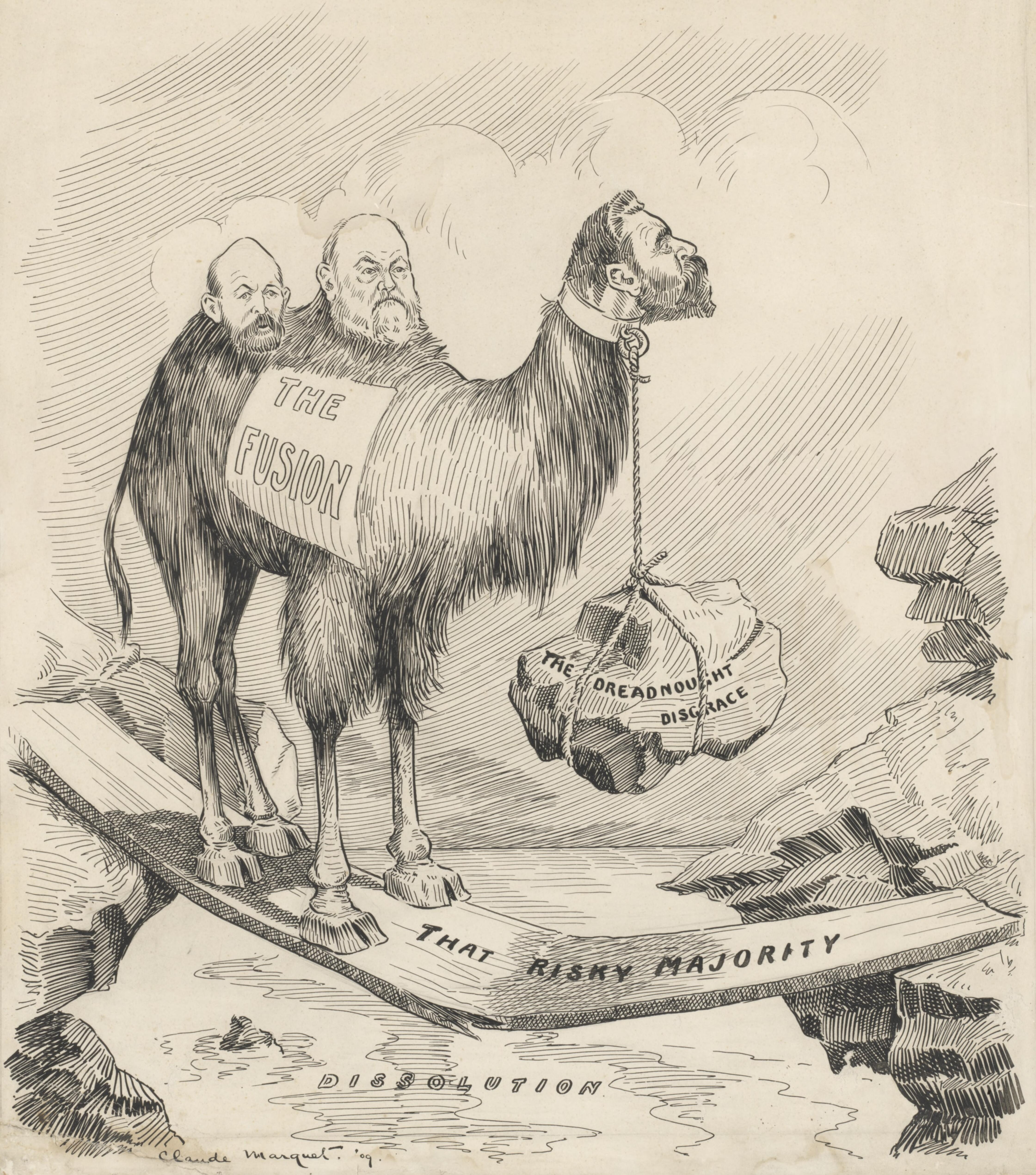
Cartoon by Claude Marquet depicting the Fusion as a camel, with Alfred Deakin as its head and Joseph Cook and John Forrest as humps

The Liberal Party was formed in response to Labor forming its second government under Andrew Fisher in 1908. Under considerable pressure from middle- and upper-class interests, Alfred Deakin, the leader of the Protectionists, and Joseph Cook, leader of the Anti-Socialists, joined forces in order to counter Labor's growing popularity. In 1909, the two parties at a meeting in Melbourne's Parliament House agreed to merge into a single party, based on a shared anti-Labor platform. Deakin was the new party's first leader, with Cook as deputy leader. The merger didn't sit well with several of the more liberal Protectionists, who defected to Labor or sat as independents.

Between them, the Protectionists and Anti-Socialists held a majority of seats on the floor of the House of Representatives. As a result, the newly merged party used its numbers to force Fisher to hand power to Deakin. However, the Liberals were defeated by Labor at the 1910 election, which saw Labor with an elected majority in both houses, the first federal occurrence for a party.

Cook took over the leadership from Deakin shortly before the 1913 election and won government by a single seat. However, only a year later, Cook deliberately introduced a bill abolishing preferential treatment for public-service union members. Cook knew the Labor-controlled Senate would vote the bill down, giving him an excuse to call a double dissolution election, the first time one would be called. When the Senate rejected the bill twice, Cook called the 1914 election. The Liberal Party was again defeated with Labor again winning a majority in both houses.

The Liberals remained in opposition until November 1916, when it reached a confidence and supply agreement with Prime Minister Billy Hughes, who had recently been expelled from Labor for supporting conscription in World War I and organised his followers as the National Labor Party. In February 1917, the Liberals and National Labor formally merged to form the Nationalist Party. Although the merged party was dominated by former Liberals, Hughes became its leader with Cook as his deputy. Hughes would stay on as prime minister until the 1922 election where the new Country Party of Australia (later The Nationals) stripped the Nationalists of their majority, and demanded his resignation in exchange for confidence and supply. Stanley Bruce subsequently became prime minister.

The Liberal Party of 1909 is often referred to by the retronym "Deakinite Liberal Party" in order to distinguish it from the later Liberal Party of Australia, which was officially founded in 1945. According to David Kemp, "the common reference to the Federal Liberal Party as the 'Commonwealth Liberal Party' is not correct, as this name was given only to Deakin's state party".

== Electoral results ==
=== Federal elections ===
Parliament of Australia – House of Representatives
Election	Votes	%	#	Seats	+/–	Status in legislature
1910	602,192 (Note: Includes results of candidates running under the "Independent Liberal" label.)	45.5%	2nd	31 / 75	31	Opposition
1913	930,076	48.9%	1st	38 / 75	7	Majority government
1914	796,397	47.2%	2nd	32 / 75	6	Opposition

Parliament of Australia – Senate
Election	Votes	%	#	Seats	+/–	Status in legislature
1910	1,830,353	45.6%	2nd	0 / 36	0	Opposition
1913	2,840,420	49.4%	1st	7 / 36	7	Opposition
1914	5,612,284	47.9%	2nd	5 / 36	2	Opposition

== Leader ==
=== Party leaders ===
No.	Leader (birth–death)	Portrait	Electorate	Took office	Left office	Term	Prime Minister (term)
1	Alfred Deakin (1856–1919)		Ballarat, Vic.	27 May 1909	20 January 1913	3 years, 238 days	Fisher (1908–1909)
1	Alfred Deakin (1856–1919)		Ballarat, Vic.	27 May 1909	20 January 1913	3 years, 238 days	Deakin (1909–1910)
1	Alfred Deakin (1856–1919)		Ballarat, Vic.	27 May 1909	20 January 1913	3 years, 238 days	Fisher (1910–1913)
2	Joseph Cook (1860–1947)		Parramatta, NSW	20 January 1913	15–22 February 1917	4 years, 33 days	Fisher (1910–1913)
2	Joseph Cook (1860–1947)		Parramatta, NSW	20 January 1913	15–22 February 1917	4 years, 33 days	Cook (1913–1914)
2	Joseph Cook (1860–1947)		Parramatta, NSW	20 January 1913	15–22 February 1917	4 years, 33 days	Fisher (1914–1915)
2	Joseph Cook (1860–1947)		Parramatta, NSW	20 January 1913	15–22 February 1917	4 years, 33 days	Hughes (1915–1923)

== Associated bodies ==
=== Australian Liberal Union ===
The Australian Liberal Union was established in November 1911, following a conference in Melbourne attended by representatives of liberal organisations in each state. The conference resolved that the state-based organisations should co-operate more closely during federal election campaigns. The council of the new body was to consist of three representatives from each state.

A second interstate conference was held in Melbourne in May 1912, with Senator Joseph Vardon presiding. A constitution for the Australian Liberal Union was adopted, where it was agreed that the organisation would be governed by an annual conference. The constitution provided that the union would regularly confer with the federal parliamentary party, and that its work would be confined to federal politics. The state organisations would remain in charge of state politics, but would select federal candidates. The conference also debated a fighting platform for the next federal election, which was not issued until 13 June. It comprised 20 planks.

A third conference was held in Melbourne in August 1913, postponed and moved from Sydney due to a smallpox outbreak. The inaugural address at the conference was given by the incumbent prime minister and parliamentary Liberal leader Joseph Cook. David Gordon was elected president of the organisation. An updated platform was issued in October. Another meeting was held in March 1914, and in October 1915 Joseph Cook stated that a meeting of the executive was planned to be held.

=== State bodies ===
==== Victoria ====
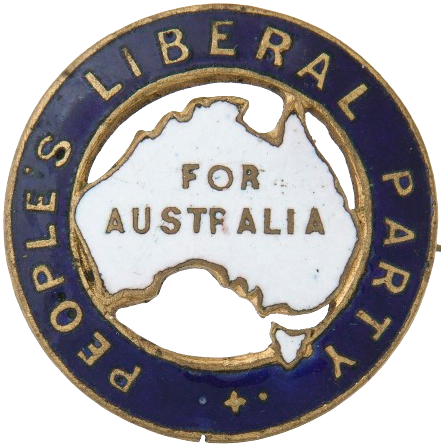
Badge used by the People's Liberal Party in Victoria

In Victoria, Deakin formed an organisation to support the parliamentary Liberals under the name Commonwealth Liberal Party (CLP). It was formed at a meeting in Melbourne on 5 April 1909, with the aim "to organise the Liberal voters, both men and women, throughout Australia". It was officially launched by Deakin with himself as president on 25 May 1909 at the Melbourne Town Hall.

According to Deakin's biographer Judith Brett, the CLP did not spread beyond Victoria and "in fact scarcely beyond Deakin and his family, who provided most of its office bearers". His son-in-law Herbert Brookes was Deakin's "right-hand man", serving as party treasurer and chief fundraiser, while Deakin's daughter Ivy Brookes was founder and secretary of the CLP women's section, intended to form a liberal counterpart to the more conservative Australian Women's National League. In 1911, the CLP renamed itself the People's Liberal Party, as part of an abortive merger with the People's Party, a rural liberal organisation. In July 1911, the PLP launched a monthly magazine, the Liberal, which was financed and edited by Herbert Brookes. Deakin wrote anonymous articles for the publication, which was short-lived.

==== New South Wales ====
The New South Wales Federal Liberal League was established in July 1909 to help elect Liberal candidates to federal parliament. It was established by delegates from the Liberal and Reform Association, the People's Reform League, the Liberal and Progressive League, and the three equivalent women's branches. Dugald Thomson was chosen as the organisation's president and Archdale Parkhill as its secretary. Joseph Cook was given the title of "leader". The league began conducting preselection ballots and endorsing candidates for federal parliament later in the year.

==== Other states ====
Organisations supporting the federal parliamentary Liberals in other states included the People's Progressive League in Queensland, the Liberal Union in South Australia (1910), the Tasmanian Liberal League, and the Liberal League of Western Australia.

== See also ==
- Liberalism in Australia
- List of political parties in Australia

== Sources ==
- Australian Dictionary of Biography – Alfred Deakin
- Australian Dictionary of Biography – Joseph Cook
- Brett, Judith (2017). The Enigmatic Mr Deakin. Text Publishing. ISBN 9781925498660.
- Kemp, David (2019). A Democratic Nation: Identity, Freedom and Equality in Australia 1901-1925 (ebook ed.). Miegunyah Press. ISBN 9780522873474.
