= Wilfred Deakin Brookes =

Sir Wilfred Brookes
- Born: 17 April 1906; Melbourne, Victoria
- Died: 1 August 1997 (aged 91)
- Relatives: Herbert Brookes (father); Ivy Brookes (mother); Alfred Brookes (brother); Alfred Deakin (grandfather)
- Military career
- Allegiance: Australia
- Branch: Royal Australian Air Force
- Service years: 1925–1945
- Rank: Group Captain
- Commands: No. 78 Wing (1943–45); No. 22 Squadron (1942)
- Conflicts: Second World War
- Awards: Knight Bachelor; Commander of the Order of the British Empire; Distinguished Service Order; Mentioned in Despatches; Air Efficiency Award

Sir Wilfred Deakin Brookes, CBE, DSO, AE (17 April 1906 – 1 August 1997) was an Australian businessman, manufacturer and Royal Australian Air Force officer. He was appointed a Commander of the Order of the British Empire in 1972 and was knighted in 1979 in recognition of his service to commerce and industry.

== Early life ==
Brookes was born in Melbourne, Victoria, to Ivy (née Deakin) and Herbert Brookes. His father was a prominent businessman, political activist and philanthropist. His maternal grandfather was the politician Alfred Deakin, who was Prime Minister of Australia at the time of Wilfred's birth.
