= Herbert Brookes =

Businessman and philanthropist

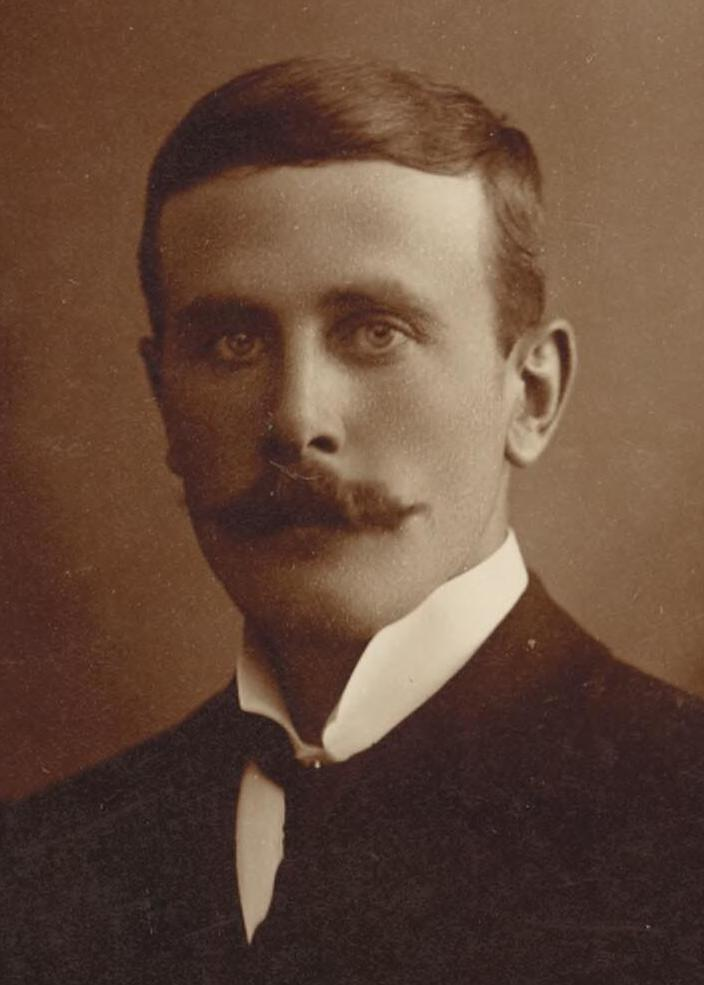

Commissioner-General for Australia in the United States of America
- In office 13 June 1929 – 23 January 1931
- Preceded by: Hugh Denison
- Succeeded by: Position abolished

Personal details
- Born: Herbert Robinson Brookes; 20 December 1867 Bendigo, Colony of Victoria
- Died: 1 December 1963 (aged 95) Melbourne, Victoria, Australia
- Spouse: Ivy Deakin (m. 1905)
- Relations: Norman Brookes (brother); Harold Brookes (brother)
- Education: University of Melbourne

Herbert Robinson Brookes (20 December 1867 – 1 December 1963) was an Australian businessman, philanthropist, and political activist. He inherited substantial holdings from his father, and served as president of the Victorian Chamber of Manufactures. He was involved in numerous charities, and was a major benefactor to the University of Melbourne, his alma mater. Brookes also filled various governmental positions, serving on the Board of Trade, the Tariff Board, the Australian Broadcasting Commission, and briefly as the first Commissioner-General to the United States.

== Early life ==
Brookes was born on 20 December 1867 in Bendigo, Victoria. He was the son of Catherine Margaret (née Robinson) and William Brookes. His younger brothers were Harold and Sir Norman Brookes, both of whom were also public figures – Harold as a businessman, and Norman as a champion tennis player.

Brookes' father had arrived in Australia at the age of 18, during the Victorian gold rush, and made a fortune from mining ventures and other endeavours. In 1878, he moved the family to Government Gums, South Australia, where for two years he oversaw the completion of part of the Central Australia Railway. Herbert assisted his father as a timekeeper and storekeeper, mixing with the adult workers. When the family moved back to Melbourne in 1881, he attended Wesley College. He later went on to the University of Melbourne, graduating with a Bachelor of Civil Engineering degree in 1890.

== Business career ==
After graduation, Brookes spent a year in Queensland working on his father's pastoral leases. He then returned to Victoria to work in the mining industry, managing a series of small mines. In 1905, Brookes moved to Melbourne to work for Austral Otis, a large engineering firm. He became a director of the company in 1912. Brookes' father died in 1910, leaving him and his siblings an estate valued at £172,000 (equivalent to $27,000,000 in 2022). He received the chairmanship of Australian Paper Mills (which his father had founded in 1882), and also managed the William Brookes & Co. pastoral holdings in Queensland and Western Australia. Brookes was president of the Victorian Chamber of Manufactures from 1913 to 1917.

== Government work ==
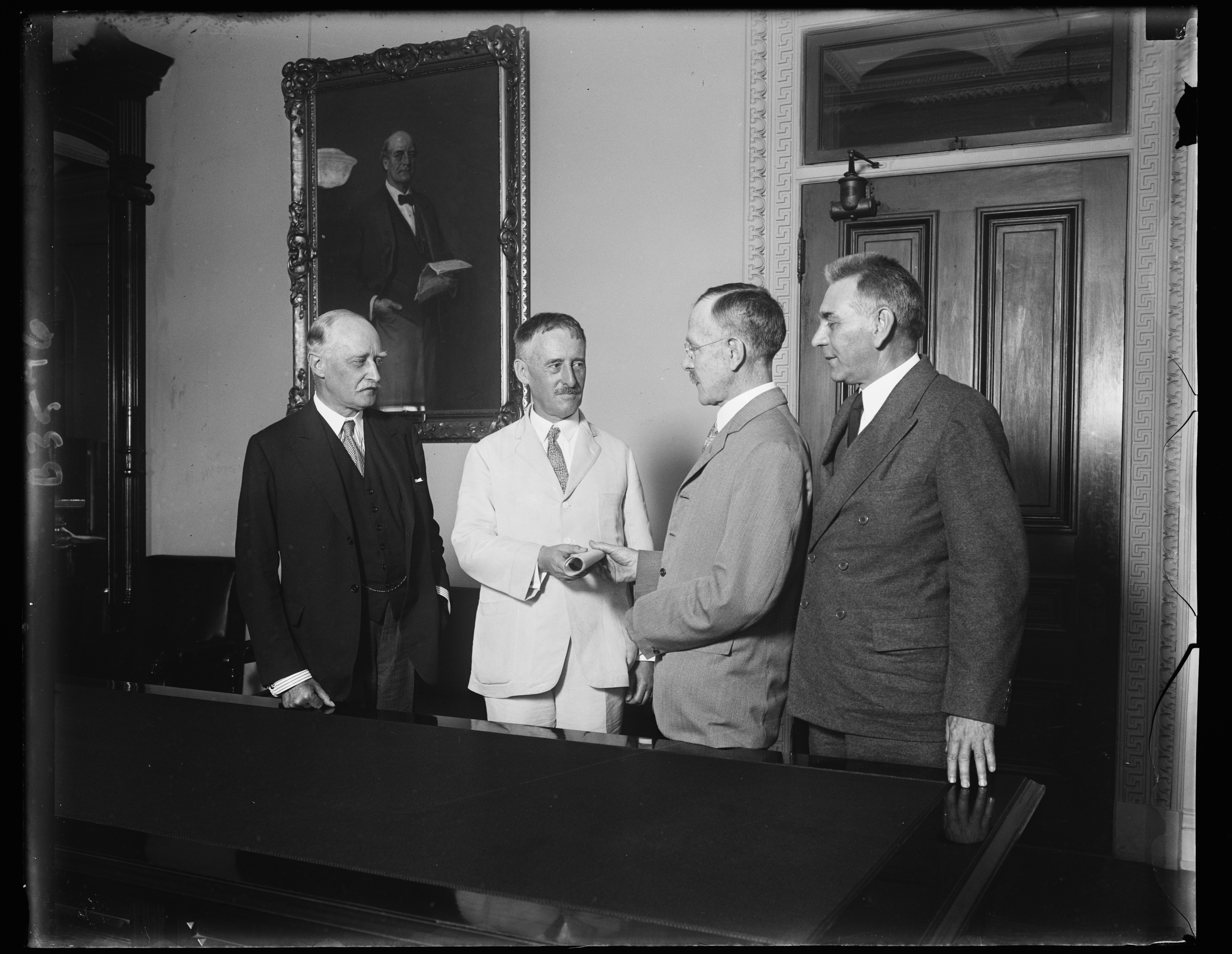
Brookes (second from right) presenting his credentials to U.S. Secretary of State Henry Lewis Stimson in 1929

Brookes served on the Board of Trade from 1918 to 1928 and the Tariff Board from 1922 to 1928. In 1929, Prime Minister Stanley Bruce appointed him Commissioner-General to the United States, working within the British embassy in Washington, D.C. as Australia did not have separate diplomatic representation at that time. He was recalled the following year to save money during the Depression. From 1932 to 1939, Brookes served on the board of the Australian Broadcasting Commission, including as vice-chairman; he was offered the chairmanship, but refused it due to his inability to secure a guarantee of independence from government control.

== Community work and philanthropy ==
As a distinguished alumnus, Brookes served on the University of Melbourne's council from 1933 to 1947, where he was particularly active on its finance committee. He financed a new wing for the university's Conservatorium of Music, and contributed towards a house for the university's vice-chancellor. He was also involved in the creation of the Melbourne Symphony Orchestra. Brookes held leadership positions in the Chautauqua Association, the League of Nations Union, and the English-Speaking Union. In 1906, he and his second wife established the T. E. Brown Society, which was initially devoted to the works of Thomas Edward Brown but later became more of a general literary society.

== Political activities ==
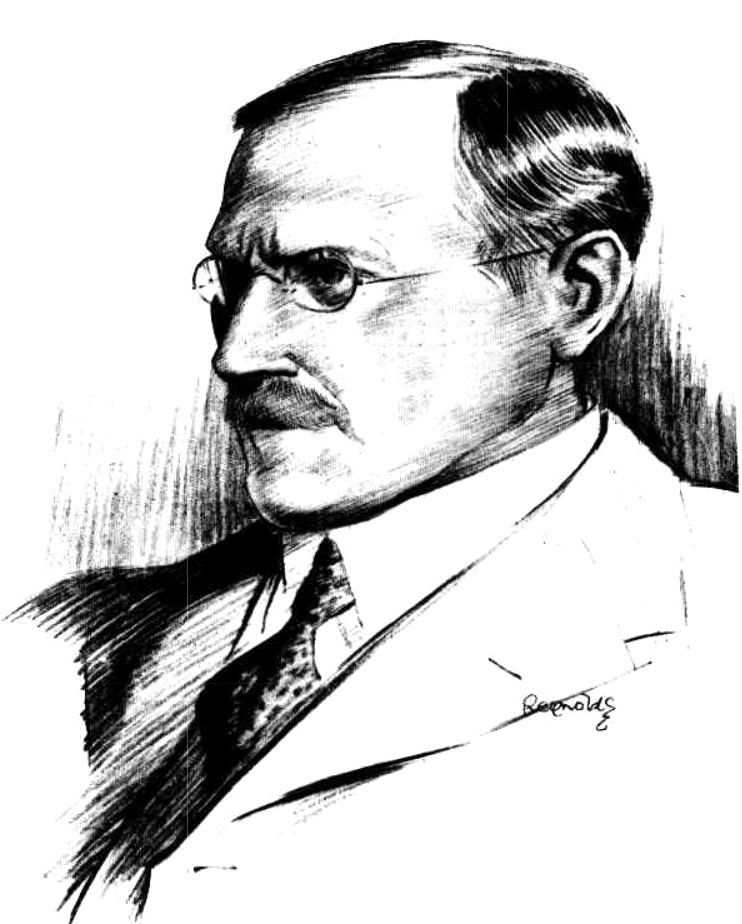
Caricature of Brookes published in Table Talk, 1929

Brookes assisted with the formation of his father-in-law's Commonwealth Liberal Party in 1909 and was later involved in the organisation of the Nationalist Party in 1917, although he was mainly active behind the scenes and never stood for public office himself. He was socially progressive, but considered the Labor Party too extreme. Always in the background of anti-Labor politics, he was a bitter and tireless campaigner against trade unions and the Catholic Church, which he saw as an instrument of Irish subversion. In the 1920s he used his considerable personal wealth to finance a private intelligence unit, which gathered information on trade unionists and Catholics. He was an advocate of profit sharing, adult education, and equal pay for women, all of which he introduced in his own companies, and campaigned for better working conditions in mines to eradicate miner's phthisis.

== Personal life ==
Brookes was a member of the Australian Church, a Melbourne congregational church known for its liberal theology. In 1897, he married Jessie Dennistoun Strong (known as Jennie), the eldest daughter of the church's founder, Charles Strong. He was widowed in 1899, and in 1905 remarried to Ivy Deakin. She was the daughter of Alfred Deakin, Prime Minister of Australia, who also attended the Australian Church. Brookes and his second wife had three children together: Sir Wilfred Deakin Brookes (a businessman and Second World War Royal Australian Airforce officer), Jessie Clarke (a social worker, who played the State of Victoria in the Melbourne centenary pageant) who married Anthony Clarke, and Alfred Deakin Brookes (the first head of ASIS).
