= Harold Brookes =

Australian businessman and sportsman

Personal information
- Full name: Harold Brookes
- Born: 6 April 1876; St Kilda, Victoria
- Died: 22 November 1953 (aged 77); Woodend, Victoria

Playing career
Years	Club	Games (Goals)
1898	St Kilda	2 (2)

Harold Eric Brookes (6 April 1876 – 22 November 1953) was an Australian businessman and sportsman.

Brookes was born in St Kilda, Victoria, to Catherine Margaret (nee Robinson) and William Brookes. His older brother Herbert Brookes was a businessman and philanthropist, while his younger brother was Sir Norman Brookes, the famous tennis player. As a youth, Brookes was a talented Australian rules football player. He played two games with St Kilda during the 1898 VFL season, kicking two goals in his first game (against Carlton). Until 2016, his brother Norman was incorrectly credited with having played those games.

After the death of their father in 1910, Brookes and his siblings shared an estate valued at £172,000 (equivalent to $27,000,000 in 2022). He became a director of Australian Paper Mills and Australasian Paper and Pulp, and was the managing partner of William Brookes and Co., which controlled several pastoral leases in Queensland and Western Australia. He also served as president of the Royal Victorian Institute for the Blind. Brookes died in 1953, aged 77. He married Dorothy Clare Bird and had three children. His father-in-law was the surgeon Frederic Dougan Bird.
