= Ivy Brookes =

Australian community worker and activist

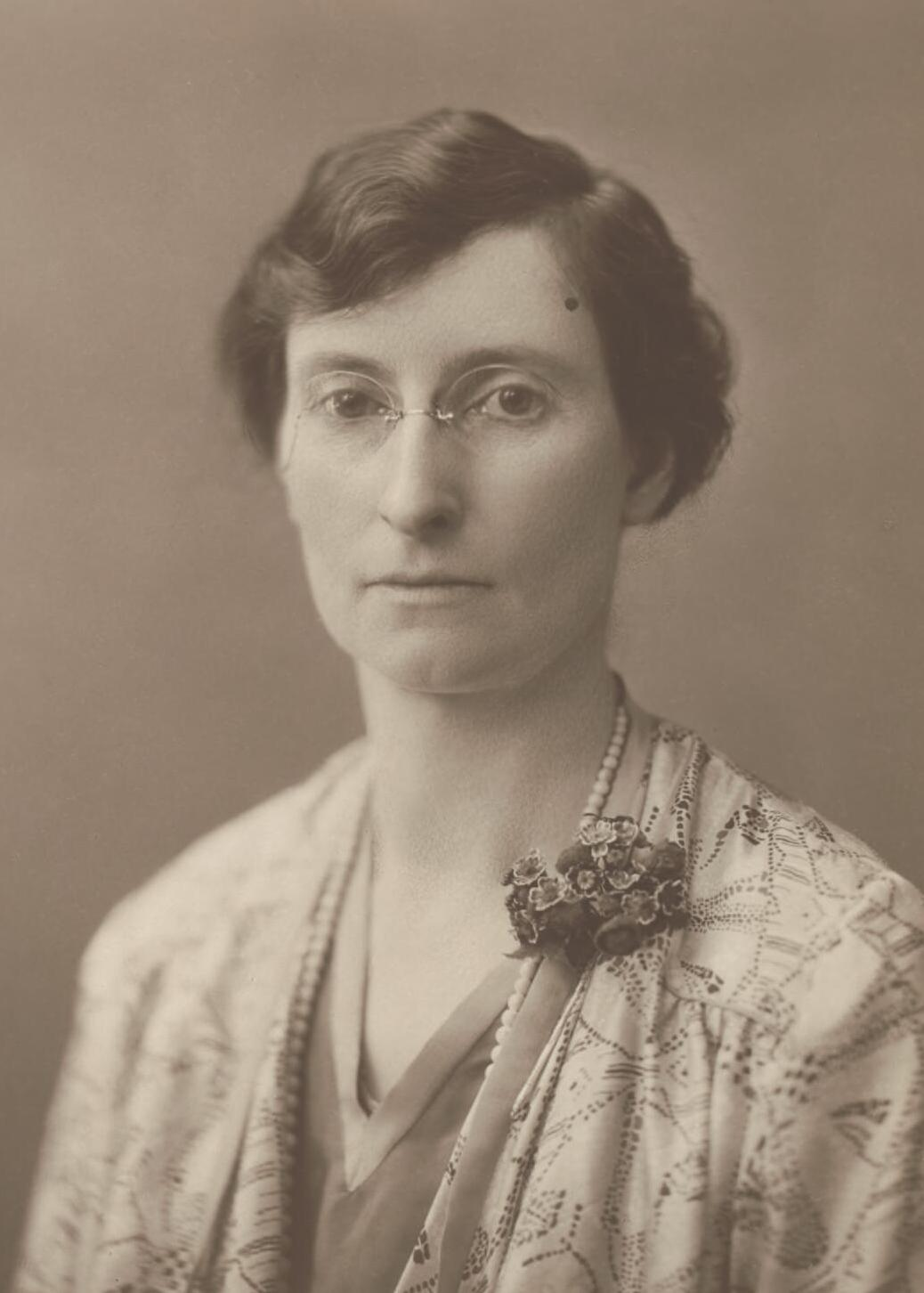
- Born: Ivy Deakin; 14 July 1883; South Yarra, Victoria, Australia
- Died: 27 December 1970 (aged 87); Melbourne, Victoria, Australia
- Education: Melbourne Girls Grammar
- Spouse: Herbert Brookes (m. 1905–1963)
- Children: Wilfred, Jessie, Alfred
- Parent(s): Alfred Deakin; Pattie Browne
- Relatives: Vera Deakin White (sister)

Ivy Deakin Brookes (14 July 1883 – 27 December 1970) was an Australian community worker and activist. She held leadership positions across a wide range of organisations in Victoria. She was president of the National Council of Women of Australia from 1948 to 1953.

== Early life ==
Deakin was born on 14 July 1883 in South Yarra, Victoria, the eldest of three daughters born to Pattie (Browne) and Alfred Deakin. Her father became the second prime minister of Australia, serving three terms between 1903 and 1910. Based on the frequency of her appearances in his diary, Alfred Deakin's biographer Judith Brett has speculated that Ivy was his favourite child. The Deakin sisters were initially tutored by their aunt Catherine Deakin, before going on to attend Melbourne Girls Grammar.

== Music ==
In 1901, Deakin began studying singing and violin at The Conservatorium of Music. She gained a diploma in 1903 and won the prestigious Ormond Scholarship in 1904, but had to relinquish it upon her marriage the following year. She was first violin in George Marshall-Hall's orchestra from 1903 to 1913, and maintained an interest in music for the rest of life. In 1926, she was appointed to the faculty of music at the University of Melbourne. She remained a member until 1969, sometimes as its only female member. She was also a foundation vice-president of the Melbourne Symphony Orchestra's ladies' committee.

== Community work ==
Brookes was involved with a wide range of organisations, and according to The Sydney Morning Herald was "never merely a figurehead or a sleeping partner in any enterprise with which she allows her name to be associated". One of her most enduring associations was with the Royal Women's Hospital, as a member of the hospital board for 50 years. In 1915, Brookes became the founding president of the Housewives Co-operative Association (later the Housewives Association of Victoria), which promoted thrift and cooperativism to combat the rising cost of living during World War I. She lived in Washington, D.C., from 1929 to 1931, during her husband's service as Commissioner-General to the United States. Upon her return she reported on American child welfare practices to the Children's Welfare Association of Victoria.

After all her children reached school age, Brookes was able to increased her public activity. She was the founder of the International Club of Victoria (1933–1958), and also held executive office in the Victorian branches of the Bureau of Social and International Affairs, the League of Nations Union, and United Nations Association. In 1937, she represented Australia at the League of Nations Assembly in Geneva, as the only woman in the Australian delegation. Brookes was elected as a justice of the peace in 1934. She was the inaugural vice-president of the Anti-Cancer Council of Victoria, from 1936 to 1966, and was a foundation member of the University of Melbourne's boards of physical education (1938–1970) and social studies (1941–1967). She was inducted posthumously onto the Victorian Honour Roll of Women in 2001.

=== Political involvement ===
Brookes shared many of her father's political beliefs, as did her husband. As an able public speaker and political organiser, she became "her father's most valuable lieutenant in organising women for the liberal cause". In 1909, she became the honorary secretary of the Commonwealth Liberal Party (CLP), an organisation which Deakin had founded to support the "Fusion" Liberal Party he created in federal parliament. The CLP was later absorbed into the People's Liberal Party, where she held a similar position. Brookes was active in policy formation, presenting policy papers on equal pay for equal work, "national social insurance", "delinquent parents", and the role of women in politics. In 1913, she attended a forum chaired by Vida Goldstein, and seconded a motion calling for the federal government to implement equal pay for equal work.

Brookes campaigned for the "Yes" vote during the 1916 and 1917 referendums on conscription, embarking on "an ambitious public speaking trail" in country Victoria. After the creation of the Nationalist Party in 1917, she also held leadership roles in the National Union and National Federation. However, she suspended her active involvement in politics after her father's death in 1919. In 1925, Brookes returned to politics as a substitute for her ill husband, organising finances and election material at the 1925 federal election. Her liberal views had previously brought her into conflict with the more conservative Australian Women's National League (AWNL), but she eventually joined the league and became a vice-president. She assisted Elizabeth Couchman in bringing the AWNL into the new Liberal Party of Australia in 1944, and became one of its founding members and "a matriarch of the party that she and Herbert regarded as the philosophical heir of her father's".

=== National Council of Women ===
Brookes was first elected to the executive of the National Council of Women of Victoria in 1912. She was re-elected to the executive in 1934, then elected vice-president in 1936 and president in 1938. She was one of the Australian delegates at the International Council of Women's 50th anniversary conference, held in Scotland in 1938. As a delegate to the National Council of Women of Australia (NCWA), Brookes chaired its press, arts and letters and peace and international relations committees for a number of years. She was elected national president in 1948, serving until 1953. During her term as president, the organisation lobbied for equal pay and abolition of the marriage bar, and advocated for the interests of migrants and indigenous people. Brookes represented the organisation at the 1951 national inflation conference and as a member of the Advisory Committee on Import Licensing Control. She was appointed a life vice-president of the NCWA at the end of her term as president.

== Personal life ==
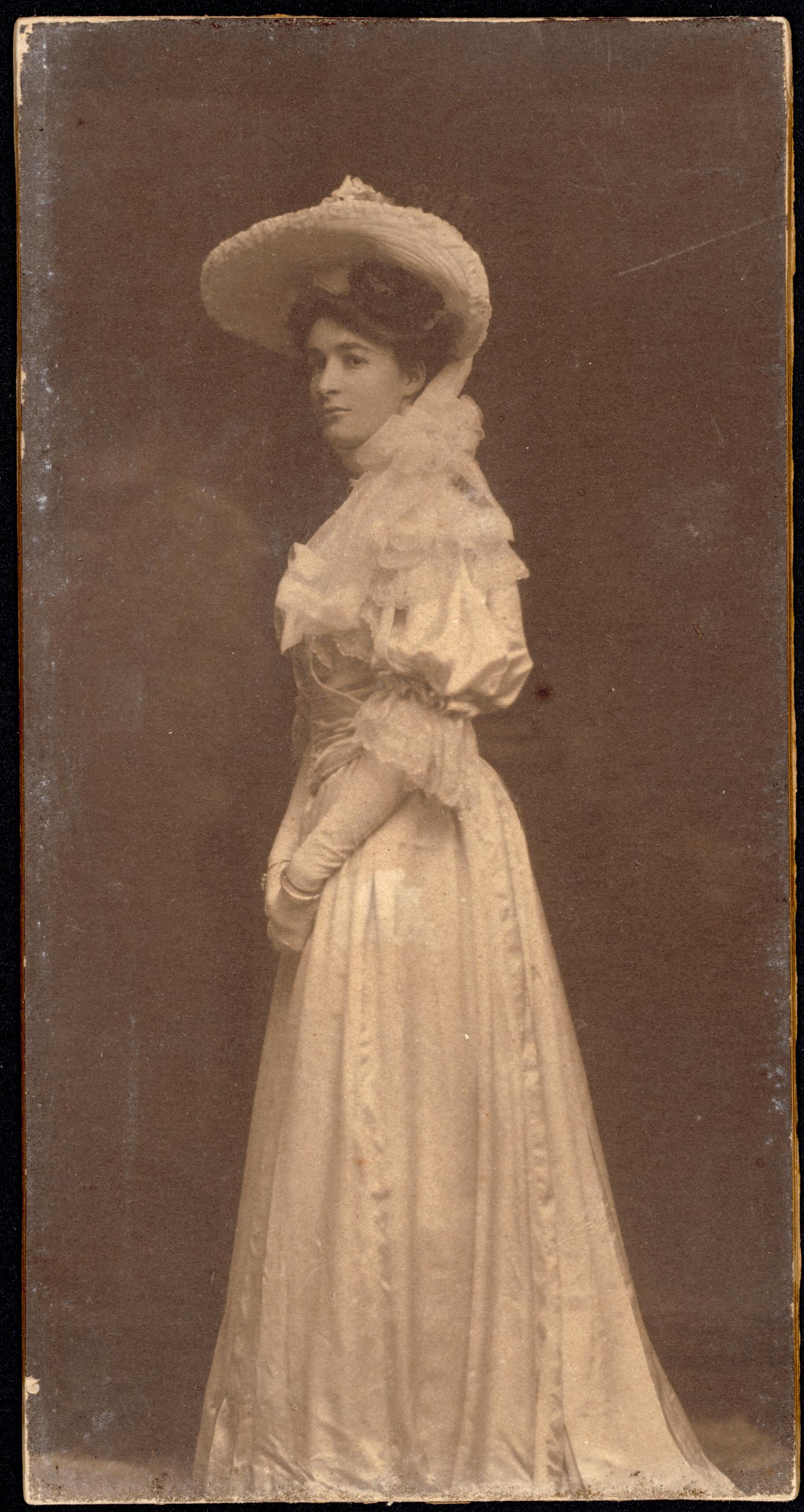
Ivy Deakin in her wedding dress in 1905

The Deakin family attended the Australian Church, a liberal congregational church run by Charles Strong. In 1905, aged 21, Ivy married Herbert Brookes, a 37-year-old widower and friend of the family who had previously been married to Strong's daughter. They had three children together:

- Sir Wilfred Deakin Brookes (1906–1997), RAAF officer and businessman.
- Jessie Deakin Clarke (1914–2014), pioneer social worker, executive director of the Victorian Refugee Emergency Council. Married Tony Clarke, son of Sir Frank Clarke in 1939.
- Alfred Deakin Brookes (1920–2005), intelligence officer, first head of the Australian Secret Intelligence Service

She was widowed in 1963 and died in Melbourne on 27 December 1970, aged 87. She was interred at St Kilda Cemetery alongside her husband.
