= List of Old Melburnians =

Old Melburnians Society Crest

This is a list of Old Melburnians, who are notable former students of Melbourne Grammar School in Melbourne, Victoria, Australia.

Alumni of Melbourne Grammar are known as Old Melburnians (abbreviated to OM, followed by peer year), and automatically become members of the school's alumni association, the Old Melburnians' Society.

Notable alumni include one Governor-General, three Prime Ministers, four State Premiers, three Lord Mayors, three Australians of the Year, two Victoria Cross recipients, ten Supreme Court Justices, fourteen AFL premiership players, forty-two Olympians, four Australian Open champions, and many prominent scientists and entertainers.

This list of notable alumni include 150 students chosen for the school's 'Talents Committed' exhibition celebrating the sesquicentenary in 2008.

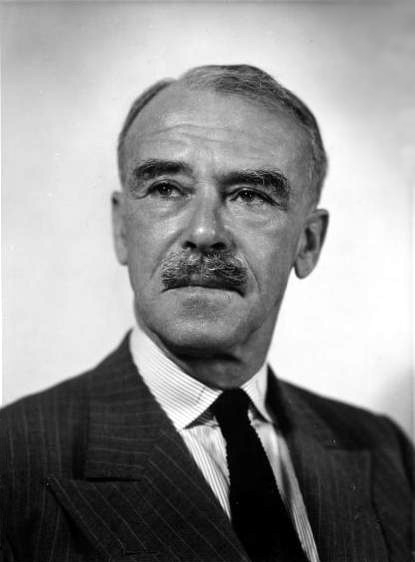
Richard Casey, Baron Casey (OM 1908) was the 16th Governor General of Australia and Australian of the Year in 1969.

== Governors ==
- Richard Casey, Baron Casey (OM 1908)– 16th Governor-General of Australia, Governor of Bengal, Australian of the Year, Federal Member of Parliament, Treasurer of Australia and final Australian in the House of Lords
- Sir Edmund Herring (OM 1910) – longest serving Lieutenant Governor of Victoria

== Prime Ministers ==
- Alfred Deakin (OM 1871) – 2nd Prime Minister of Australia
- Stanley Bruce (OM 1901) – 8th Prime Minister of Australia
- Malcolm Fraser (OM 1948) OM 1948 – 22nd Prime Minister of Australia

== State Premiers ==
- Sir Rupert Hamer (OM 1929) – 39th Premier of Victoria
- John Brumby (OM 1970)– 45th Premier of Victoria
- Ted Baillieu (OM 1970) – 46th Premier of Victoria
- Arthur Moore – 23rd Premier of Queensland

== Mayors ==
- Sir John George Davies – 19th mayor of Hobart and cricketer
- Sir Harold Luxton (OM 1906) – 61st Lord Mayor of Melbourne and businessman
- Sir Harold Gengoult Smith – 62nd Lord Mayor of Melbourne and doctor

== Australians of the Year ==
- Richard Casey (OM 1908) – 16th Governor-General of Australia, Governor of Bengal, former Australian of the Year (1969), and final Australian in the House of Lords
- Manning Clark (OM 1933)– historian and former Australian of the Year (1980)
- Simon Mckeon (OM 1973) - yachtsman, businessman, lawyer, philanthropist, and former Australian of the Year (2011)

William Ellis Newton VC (OM 1937) was the only Australian to be awarded the Victoria Cross while flying with an RAAF squadron. He was executed by the Japanese in 1943.

== Victoria Cross recipients ==
- William Donovan Joynt (OM 1904)– served in France with the First Australian Imperial Force in World War I
- Flight Lieutenant Bill Newton (OM 1937) – served as a pilot with the RAAF in Papua New Guinea in World War I

== Military and security services ==
=== Army ===
- Major General Sir Charles Ryan (OM 1869) – army surgeon and Victoria's Principal Medical Officer
- Major General Frederic Hughes (OM 1872) – army officer
- Lieutenant Colonel Gordon Chesney Wilson – army officer
- rMajor General Harold Grimwade (OM 1883) – army officer and businessman
- Major General Sir Samuel Burston (OM 1903) – army officer officer, honorary phyisican to King George VI
- Lieutenant General Sir Edmund Herring (OM 1901) – army officer
- Lieutenant General Sir Vernon Sturdee (OM 1905)– army officer and Chief of the General Staff
- Brigadier General Sir William Johnston (OM 1905) – army officer and medical practitioner
- Cyril Seelenmeyer (OM 1907) – VFL footballer, veterinary surgeon, winner of Military Cross
- Lieutenant General Edward Smart (OM 1908) – army officer and Australian Consul-General
- Major General Sir Frank Kingsley Norris (OM 1910) – army officer and physician
- Major General Ronald Hopkins (OM 1914) – army officer
- Lieutenant Colonel Philip Rhoden (OM 1933) – Army officer and lawyer
- Brigadier General William Jamieson (OM 1940) - army officer
- General Sir Roger Wheeler (OM 1952) – army officer and Chief of the General Staff
- Oscar Jenkins (OM 2010) - prisoner of war
- Lieutenant General Sir Leslie Morshead (staff member) – army officer

=== Navy ===
- Admiral Sir Ernest Gaunt (OM 1876) – Royal Navy Admiral and Aide-De-Camp to King George V
- Admiral Sir Guy Gaunt (OM 1883) – Royal Navy Admiral and British Conservative member of parliament
- Admiral Sir Ian McIntosh (OM 1931) – Royal Navy officer

=== Air Force ===
- Air Vice-Marshal William Anderson (OM 1910) – air force officer
- Cedric Howell (OM 1913) – fighter pilot and flying ace
- Air Vice Marshall Adrian Cole (OM 1914) – Air Vice Marshall RAAF
- Richard Minifie (OM 1915) – fighter pilot and flying ace
- Sir Wilfred Deakin Brookes (OM 1922) – businessman and RAAF officer

=== Security Services ===
- Alfred Deakin Brookes (OM 1936) – intelligence officer first Director-General of the Australian Secret Intelligence Service
- Ian Kennison (OM 1937) – intelligence officer and Director-General of the Australian Secret Intelligence Service
- Sir Edward Woodward (OM 1945) – Federal Court Judge and Director-General of the Australian Security Intelligence Organisation

== Clergy ==
- Reverend Canon Ernest Hughes (OM 1876) - Canon at St Paul's Cathedral, Melbourne
- Reverend Canon Lionel Bakewell (OM 1921) - clergyman and missionary
- Horace Crotty – Anglican Bishop of Bathurst
- Peter John Elliott (OM 1961)– Auxiliary bishop of the Archdiocese of Melbourne
- Awdry Julius – Dean of Christchurch
- Geraldine MacKenzie – missionary
- Bishop John McKie (OM 1927) – Archdeacon of Melbourne
- Father Gerard Tucker (OM 1902) – priest and advocate for the poor
- Bishop Allen Winter (OM 1922) – clergyman and theological scholar
- Rabbi Emeritus Dr John Levi (OM 1951) - first Australian-born rabbi

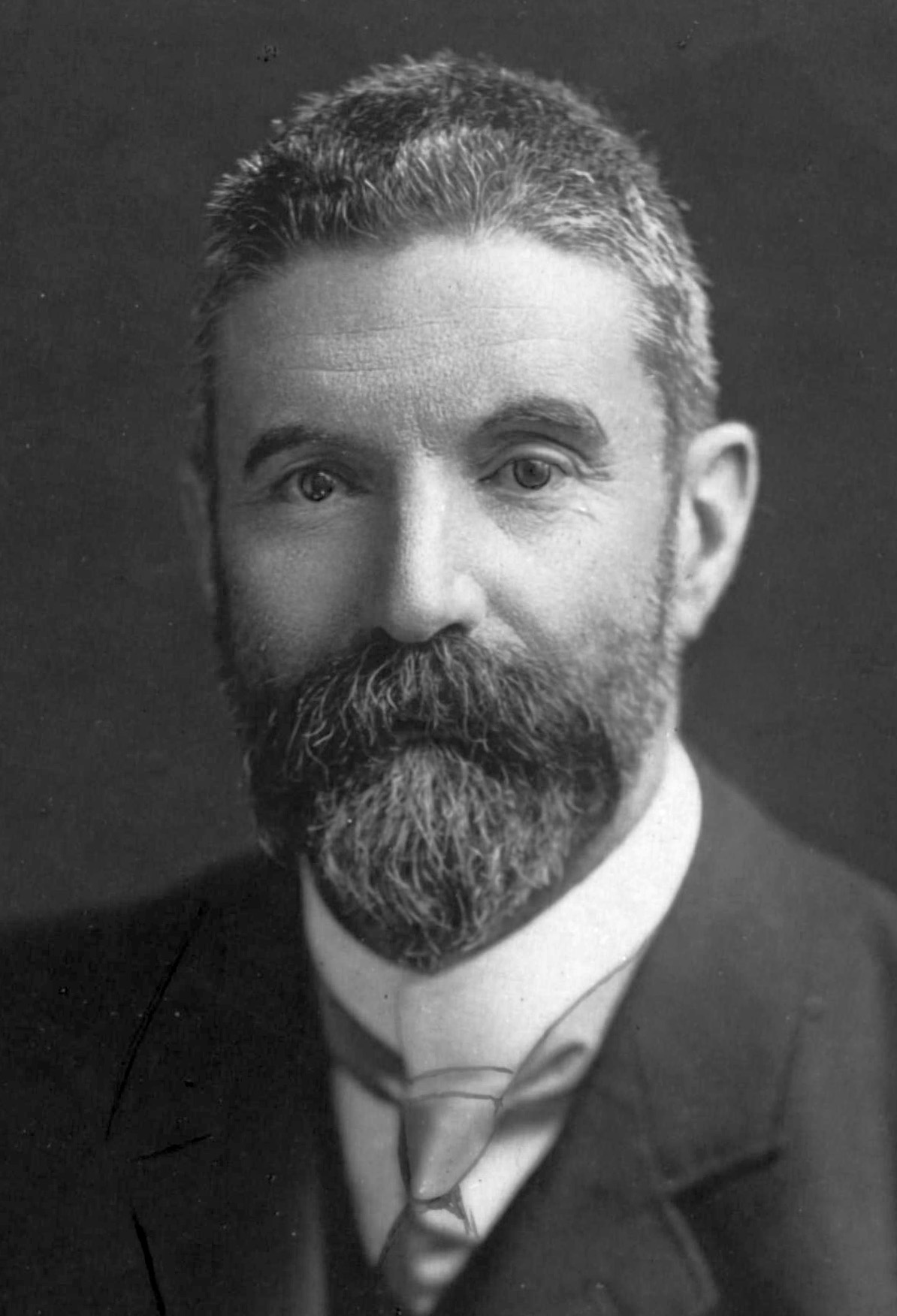
Alfred Deakin was Australia's second Prime Minister and a key advocate for Australia's Federation.

== Law and government ==
=== Federal Parliament ===
- Alfred Deakin – Member for Ballaarat and 2nd Prime Minister of Australia
- Stanley Bruce – Member for Flinders and 8th Prime Minister of Australia
- Malcolm Fraser – Liberal Member for Wannon 22nd Prime Minister of Australia
- Richard Casey - Member for Corio and Treasurer, Liberal Member for La Trobe and Minister for External Affairs
- Tony Street (OM 1944) – Liberal Member for Corangamite and Minister for Foreign Affairs
- Sir Wilfrid Kent Hughes (OM 1914) - Liberal Member for Chisholm and Minister for Interior
- Agar Wynne – Member for Balaclava and Postmaster General of Australia
- Sam Calder – Country Liberal Member for Northern Territory
- John Jess - Liberal Member for La Trobe
- Jo Gullett – Liberal Member for Henty
- Alex Buchanan - Liberal Member for McMillan
- Geoffry Hurry – Nationalist Member for Bendigo
- Justin Foxton - Federal Member for Brisbane
- Marshall Baillieu - Liberal Member for La Trobe
- James Chester Manifold - Member for Corangamite
- Robert Officer Blackwood - Member for Riverina
- Maurice Blackburn - Labor Member for Bourke
- John Brumby - Labor Member for Bendigo
- Race Matthews - Labor Member for Casey
- Peter Baume - Liberal Senator for New South Wales

=== State Parliament ===
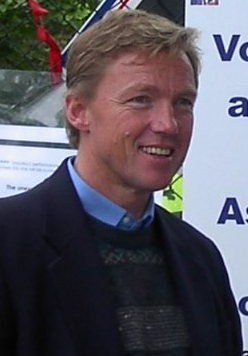
John Thwaites was Deputy Premier of Victoria.

==== Victoria ====
- Sir Walter Manifold 1867 – Nationalist Member for Western Province and President of the Legislative Council
- Alfred Deakin (OM 1871) - Member of the Legislative Assembly and Solicitor-General
- William Moule 1875 – Member for Brighton and Australian test cricketer
- Henry Zwar 1888- UAP Member for Heidelberg
- William Lionel Russell Clarke (OM 1893) - UAP Member for Southern Province
- Maurice Blackburn (OM 1896) – Labor Member of Parliament, Speaker of the Legislative Assembly of Victoria
- Sir George Lansell 1902 - Liberal Member for Bendigo Province
- Sir Harold Luxton (OM 1906) - Nationalist Member for Caulfield
- Harold Thonemann (OM 1908) - United Australia Party Member for Toorak
- Sir Wilfrid Kent Hughes (OM 1914) - State Member for Kew and 4th Deputy Premier of Victoria
- Trevor Oldham (OM 1917) - Liberal Member for Malvern and Deputy Premier of Victoria
- Sir Rutherford Guthrie (OM 1918) – Liberal Member for Ripon and State President of the Victorian Liberal Party
- Michael Clarke (OM 1927)- Country Party Member for Northern Province
- Sir Rupert Hamer (OM 1929) – Liberal Member for Kew and 39th Premier of Victoria
- Pat Dickie (OM 1936) - Liberal Member for Balarat Province and Minister for Health
- Vasey Houghton (OM 1937) – Liberal Member for Templestowe Province Legislative Council
- Charles Francis (OM 1942) - Liberal Member for Caulfield
- Alan Hunt 1945- Liberal Member for South Eastern Province and President of the Legislative Council
- Fred Grimwade (OM 1951) - Liberal Member for Bendigo Province and President of the Legislative Council
- Race Matthews (OM 1951) - Labor Member for Oakleigh and Minister for the Arts, Minister for Police and Emergency Services
- David Evans (OM 1951) - National Party Member for North Eastern Province
- Rob Maclellan (OM 1952) - Liberal Member for Pakenham and Minister for Planning
- Ted Tanner – Liberal Member for Caulfield and Government Whip
- Tony Hyams (OM 1963) - Liberal Member for Dromana
- David Lean (OM 1963) - Liberal Member for Carrum
- Ted Baillieu (OM 1970) – Liberal Member for Hawthorn and 46th Premier of Victoria
- John Brumby (OM 1970) – Labor Member for Broadmeadows and 45th Premier of Victoria
- John Thwaites – Labor Member for Albert Park and 24th Deputy Premier of Victoria
- Andrew McIntosh - Liberal Member for Kew and Minister for Corrections
- Doug Jennings - Liberal Member for Westernport (Victoria) and National Party Member for Southport (Queensland)
- Baron Snider - Liberal Member for St Kilda
- Russell Stokes - Liberal Member for Evelyn
- Philip Hudson - Liberal Member for Toorak
- Ian Davis - Liberal Member for Essendon
- Stan Gleeson - Liberal Member for South Western
- Matthew Bach (OM 2001) - Liberal Member for Eastern Metropolitan Region

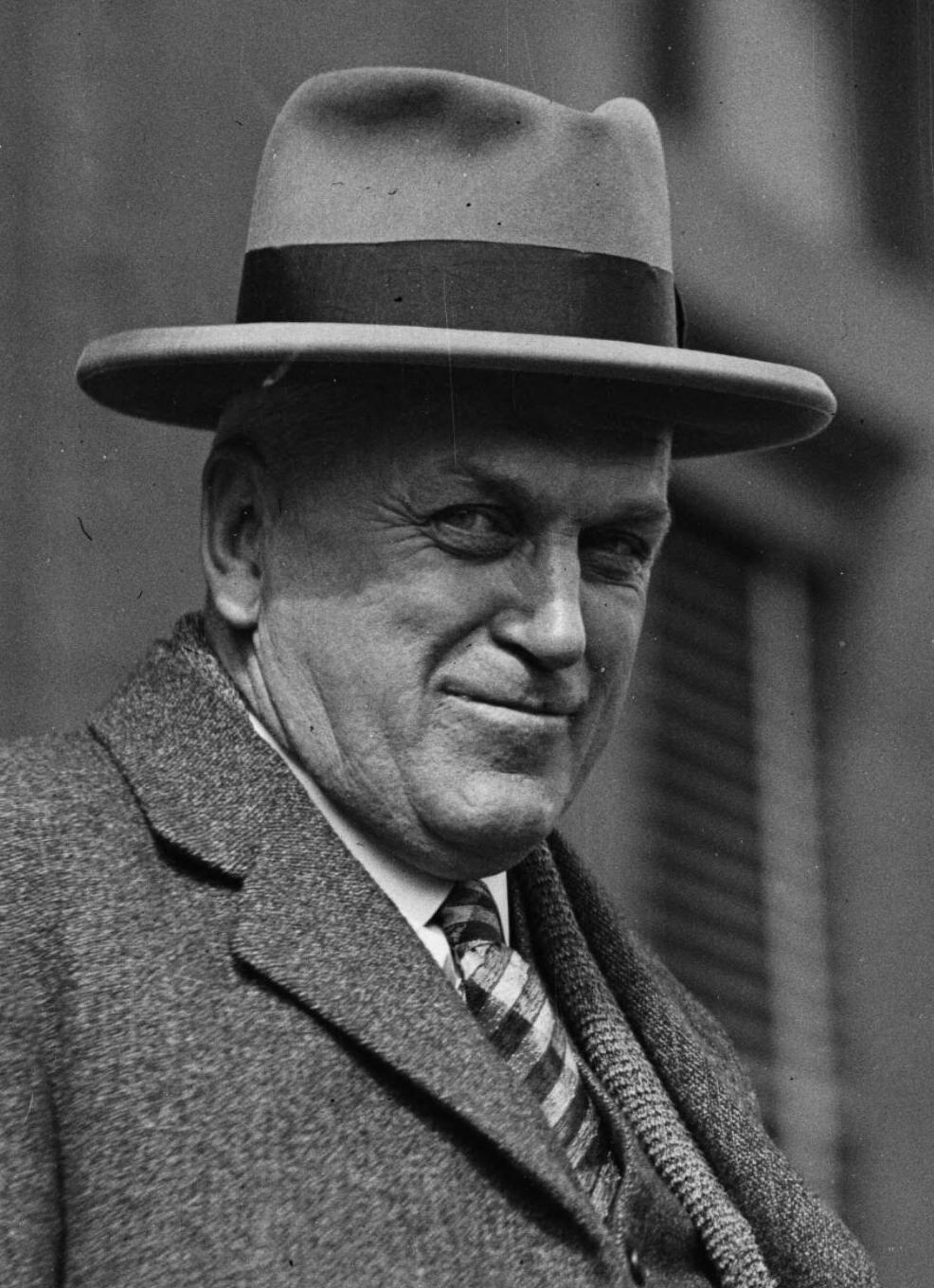
Arthur Moore was Country Party Premier of Queensland from 1929 to 1932

==== Queensland ====
- Arthur Moore – 23rd Premier of Queensland
- Doug Jennings - Liberal Member for Westernport (Victoria) and National Party Member for Southport (Queensland)
- Justin Foxton - Member for Carnarvon
- Frank Reid Murphy - Member for Barcoo
- Ernest James Stevens - Member for Warrego, Member for Logan, Member of the Legislative Council.

Tasmania

- Sir John George Davies - Member for Fingal, Member for Denison, Speaker of the Legislative Assembly
- Ronald Smith - Member for Launceston

==== Western Australia ====
- Arthur Abbott – Liberal Member for North Perth and Attorney-General of Western Australia
- Les Craig – Member for the Legislative Council (Western Australia)

=== Local Government ===
- Sir Harold Luxton – businessman and Lord Mayor of Melbourne
- Sir Harold Gengoult Smith (OM 1909) – 62nd Lord Mayor of Melbourne and doctor
- Sir John George Davies – mayor of Hobart and cricketer
- Roy Morgan - Melbourne City Councillor and pollster

=== High Court of Australia ===
- Sir Keith Aickin (OM 1933) – Justice of the High Court of Australia
- Austin Asche (OM 1943) – 3rd Chief Justice of the Northern Territory

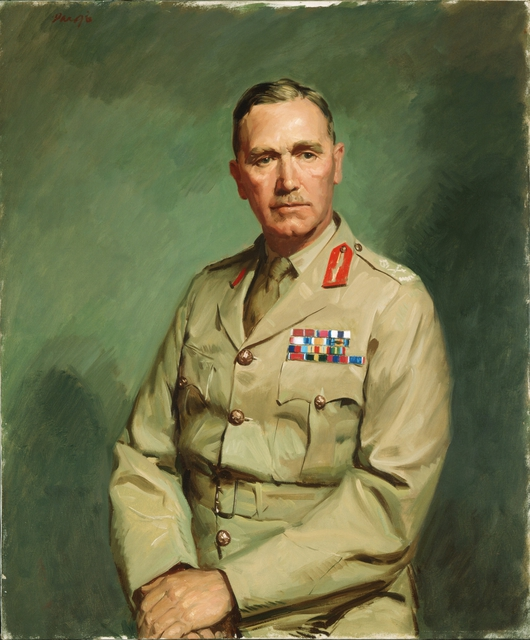
Sir Edmund Herring was Chief Justice of Victoria and Lieutenant Governor. The oval opposite Melbourne Grammar on Domain Road is named in his honour.

=== Federal Court ===
- Sir Edward Woodward (OM 1945) - Justice of the Federal Court and Royal Commissioner
- Sir Reginald Allfree Smithers - Justice of the Federal Court
- Will Alstergren (OM 1980) - Chief Judge of the Federal Circuit Court of Australia

=== Supreme Court of Victoria ===
- Sir Edmund Herring – Chief Justice of the Supreme Court
- Chris Maxwell (OM 1970) – President of the Victorian Court of Appeal
- Kenneth Marks – Justice of the Supreme Court of Victoria and Royal Commissioner
- John Batt (OM 1953) – Justice of the Supreme Court
- Frank Callaway (OM 1964) – Justice of the Court of Appeal
- David Harper – Justice of the Supreme Court
- Sir Henry Hodges (OM 1864)– Justice of the Supreme Court
- Sir Reginald Sholl (OM 1919) – Rhodes scholar and Justice of the Supreme Court
- William Ormiston (OM 1953) – Justice of the Court of Appeal
- David Ashley (OM 1959) - Justice of the Court of Appeal
- Hartley Hansen - Justice of the Court of Appeal
- Alec Southwell - Justice of the Supreme Court

=== Lawyers ===
- Julian Burnside – barrister and human rights advocate
- Philip Opas – Barrister; defence counsel for Ronald Ryan
- Sir Edward Fancourt Mitchell – barrister and expert in constitutional law
- Frank Cumbrae-Stewart – barrister and Garrick Professor of Law

=== Public Service ===
- Sir George Julius (OM 1889) – First Chairman of the CSIRO and inventor of the first tote-board
- Sir Harold Winthrop Clapp (OM 1893) – Chairman of the Victorian Railway Commissioners
- Sir Alan George Turner - Clerk of the House of Representatives
- Sir George Henry Jenkins - First Clerk of the House of Representatives and President of the Old Melburnians Society
- Alexander Leeper (OM 1903) - diplomat
- Noël St. Clair Deschamps (OM 1926) – public servant and diplomat
- Sir Peter Garran (OM 1927) - diplomat
- Sir Edwin Hicks ("Ted") – diplomat and secretary of defence
- Donald Mackinnon - diplomat
- Sir Reginald Leeper (OM 1905) – diplomat and founder of the British Council
- John McMillan (OM 1931) – diplomat
- Sir Keith Officer (OM 1907) – diplomat
- John Brugess (OM 1957) - diplomat

== Community ==
- Dr Cecil Gordon McAdam (OM 1908) - co-founder and leader of the Lord Somers Camp
- Dr David Scott (OM 1941) - charity director, President of the Australian Council of Social Services
- John Hicks (OM 1958) - Chief Executive Officer of the Tiwi Land Council

== Academia and Medicine ==
=== Administrators ===
- Sir Robert Blackwood (OM 1923)– businessman and first Vice-Chancellor of Monash University
- Sir John Grice (OM 1866) – businessman and Vice-Chancellor of The University of Melbourne
- Prof Richard Larkins (OM 1960) – medical researcher and vice-chancellor of Monash University
- Mervyn Austin – Rhodes Scholar and former Headmaster of Newington College and professor in classics
- Sir Irvine Masson (OM 1904) – chemist and vice-chancellor of the University of Sheffield
- Sir James William Barrett (1872) – surgeon and Chancellor and Vice-Chancellor of The University of Melbourne
- William Perry French Morris (OM 1896) - founding headmaster of Anglican Church Grammar School
- Tony Hewison (OM 1952) - headmaster of St Michael's Grammar School

=== Medicine ===
- Sir Edward Hughes – surgeon and former president of the Royal Australasian College of Surgeons
- Sir Cecil Colville (OM 1908) - surgeon physician, and first President of the Australian Medical Association
- Professor Charles Kellaway (OM 1906) – medical researcher and second director of the Walter and Eliza Hall Institute
- Dr Ainslie Meares (OM 1929)– psychiatrist and expert in the medical use of hypnotist
- Dr Gilbert Troup - anaesthetist, Australian Society of Anaesthetists
- Dr John Birrell (OM 1941) - surgeon
- Dr Nigel Gray (OM 1946) - public health advocate
- Professor Graeme Ryan (OM 1955) - medical researcher
- Professor Geoffrey Taylor (OM 1957) - plastic surgeon
- Professor Graham Brown (OM 1964) - medical researcger
- Professor Stephen Cordner (OM 1970) - forensic pathologist
- Professor Julian Smith (OM 1975) - cardiothoracic surgeon
- Professor Christopher Fairley (OM 1977) - infectious diseases physician
- Professor Peter Choong - othropaedic surgeon

=== Academics ===
- Manning Clark (OM 1933) – historian and Australian of the Year (1980)
- Sir Keith Hancock (OM 1916) – Rhodes Scholar and Australia historian
- A.G.L. Shaw (OM 1933) – historian and academic
- Godfrey Tanner – academic
- Peter Dixon – economist
- Alfred John North – ornithologist
- Pierre Gorman (OM 1942) – expert on deaf communication
- Norval Morris (OM 1938) – legal academic and criminologist
- Miles Lewis (OM 1960) – architectural historian
- Professor Michael Gerogeff (OM 1963) - scientist
- Dr John Adamson (OM 1976) - historian
- John F. O. Bilson – Professor of Finance
- Andrew Prentice (OM 1961) – mathematician and expert on the formation of the Solar System

=== Architecture ===
- Sir Roy Grounds (OM 1923) - architect

=== Explorers ===
- John Rymill – Polar explorer
- Captain Edward Bage (1904) – military officer and polar explorer
- Peter Bland (OM 1986) - adventurer
- James Allen (OM 1990) - adventurer and youngest to climb Mount Everest from the North Side

== Commerce and Industry ==
- Ross Adler (OM 1962) – business executive and philanthropist
- Sir Harry Brookes Allen (OM 1870) – pathologist
- Sir Russell Grimwade (OM 1895)– businessman and philanthropist
- Lord Clive Baillieu (OM 1908) – businessman, public servant, and rower
- James Cuming Jr. - industrial chemist and business leader
- Francis 'Pop' Vine (OM 1922) - businessman and footballer
- Robert Champion de Crespigny (OM 1968)– multi-millionaire founder of Normandy Mining Limited and former Australian Businessman of the Year
- Martin Chapman – New Zealand barrister and founder of Chapman Tripp
- Sir Peter Derham – business executive and philanthropist
- Carrillo Gantner (OM 1962) – founder of the Playbox Theater and patron of the arts, former Victorian of the Year
- Aubrey Gibson – businessman and philanthropist
- Sir John Grice – businessman and Vice-Chancellor of The University of Melbourne
- Sir Russell Grimwade – businessman and philanthropist
- Simon Mckeon – champion yachtsman, businessman, lawyer, philanthropist, and Australian of the Year
- Andrew Michelmore (OM 1970) – Rhodes Scholar, mining executive, and first Australian gold medal for rowing
- Lancelot de Mole – engineer and inventor of the first tank
- Jim Penman – founder of Jim's Group and historian
- Brian Roet – hypnotist and AFL premiership winner
- Cedric Ian Turner – architect
- Kenneth Baillieu Myer (OM 1931)– Chairman of Myer and founding Chairman of the ABC
- Rupert Myer – Chairman of the Australia Council for the Arts

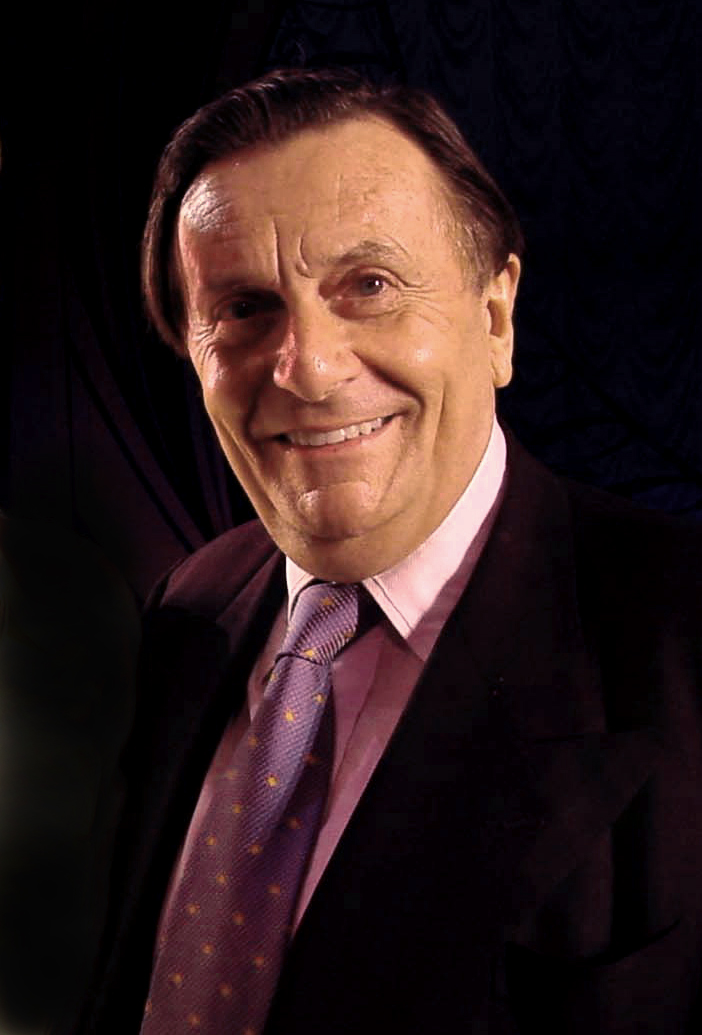
Barry Humphries AC CBE (OM 1951) is one of Australia's best known comedians.

== Media, entertainment, and the arts ==
=== Theatre, Film and Television ===
- Barry Humphries (OM 1951) – Tony award-winning actor and comedian
- Sir Frank Tait (OM 1898)– theatre entrepreneur
- Frank Thring (OM 1941) – actor in Ben-Hur and King of Kings
- Rob Sitch – film director, producer, and screenwriter
- Michael Veitch – actor, broadcaster, author
- Oscar Asche (OM 1887)– actor, director, and writer
- Caroline Craig – actress
- Andrew Daddo – actor, voice artist, author and television personality
- Barrie Kosky (OM 1984) – opera and theatre director
- Jonathan Dawson – screenwriter, director, academic and columnist
- Christopher Muir – producer, director and Head of ABC Television drama
- Nick Russell – television actor, producer, and director

=== Artists ===
- John Brack (staff member) – artist
- Derwent Lees (OM 1900) – artist

=== Musicians ===
- Luca Arcaro - Bassist
- John Wion (OM 1954) - flutist
- Leslie Howard (OM 1965) – concert pianist and composer
- Robin Casinader – musician
- Michael Phillips - Musician (known for Radio Free Alice)
- Alex Laska - Guitarist, Producer and Musician
- Fergus Linacre - Singer
- Angus McKean - Musician
- Sir William McKie (OM 1918) – Organist and Master of the Choristers at Westminster Abbey
- Geoffrey Simon (OM 1963) – orchestra conductor
- Mick Turner – musician (Dirty Three) and artist
- Li-Wei Qin – international concert cellist
- Hugo Race – musician
- Dan Robinson – singer
- Peggy Frew – ARIA-winning composer and novelist

=== Writers and Journalists ===
- Chester Wilmot (OM 1930) – war correspondent
- Arthur Topp - journalist
- Rafael Epstein - ABC radio presenter
- James Campbell – journalist
- Erle Cox – journalist and science fiction writer
- Keith Dunstan (OM 1938(– journalist and author
- Ian Gawler – author
- William Hay (OM 1893)– author and essayist
- Sir Randal Heymanson – journalist
- Nam Le – writer
- Terence (Terry) James McCrann (OM 1965) – Australia's leading business journalist
- Tom Morris – sports journalist
- John Bryson – author
- Michael Schildberger – journalist and host of A Current Affair

== Legend ==
- Richard de Crespigny – Pilot of Qantas Flight 32

== Sport ==
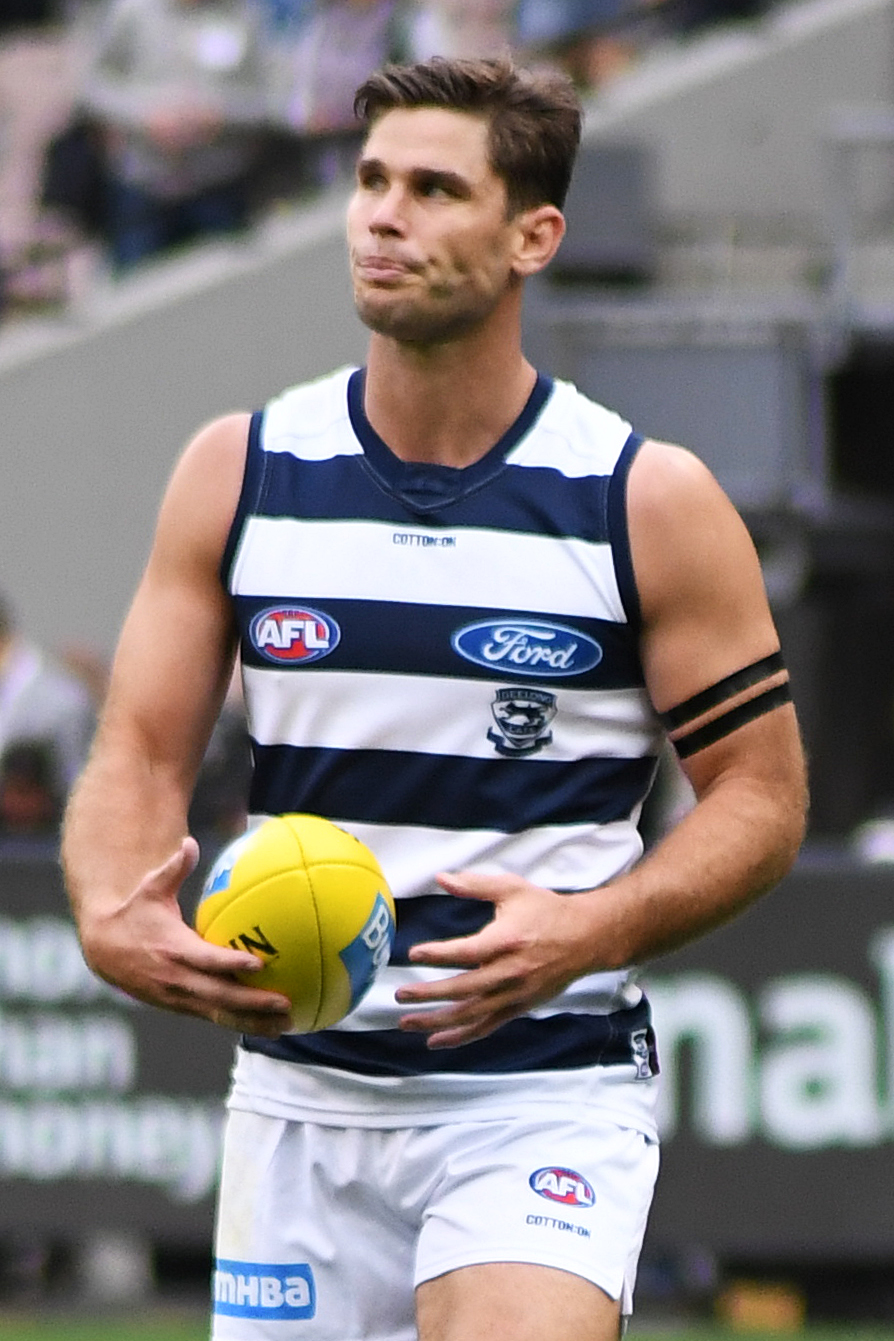
Tom Hawkins played 359 games for the Geelong Football Club including 3 premierships

=== Australian rules football ===
see also: Old Melburnians Football Club

- James Aitken
- Jack Atkins
- Dick Atkinson
- Simon Beaumont
- Toby Bedford
- Sam Berry
- Arthur Best
- Lewis Blackmore
- Rohan Brown
- Murray Clapham
- Dylan Clarke
- Ryan Clarke
- Jack Cockbill
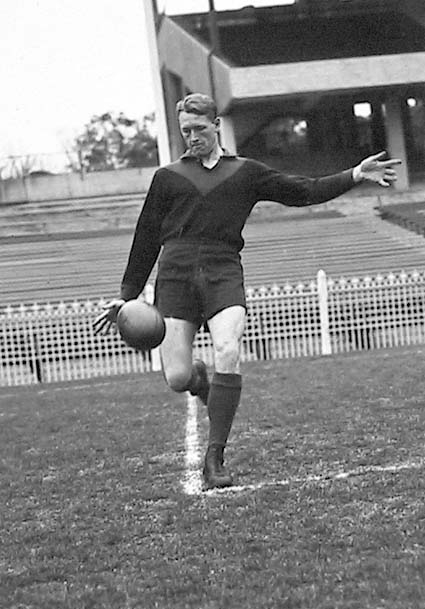
  Don Cordner was captain of the Melbourne Football Club and winner of the 1946 Brownlow Medal
  John Conway – captain of Carlton and cricketer
- Peter Cooper
- David Cordner
- Denis Cordner
- Don Cordner (OM 1939) – Brownlow Medallist, 2-time Premiership winner, captain of Melbourne, and doctor
- Harry Cordner
- John Cordner
- Ted Cordner
- Simon Crawshay
- David Cuningham
- Percy Damman
- Johnny Dando
- Simon Deacon
- Bill Denehy
- Frank Dossetor
- Harcourt Dowsley – AFL player and cricketer
- Steven May was a two time All Australian and Premiership player with Melbourne and Captain of the Gold Coast Suns.
  Nathan Drummond
- Kyle Dunkley
- Charlie Edwards
- Shaun Edwards
- Xavier Ellis – Premiership player for Hawthorn
- Ken Forge
- Simon Fraser – AFL player and Olympic rower
- Corrie Gardner – first Premiership winner for Melbourne and Olympic hurdler
- Eric Gardner
- Mark Gardner
- Ed Garlick
- David Gaunson
- Dave Gibson
- Audley Gillespie-Jones
- Hugh Goddard
- John Goold – 2-time Premiership winner for Carlton
- Steven Greene
- Stuart Griffiths
- Housie Grounds
- Herbert Guthrie – AFL player and cricketer
- Dick Hallo
- Jack Hawkins
- Tom Hawkins – 5× All Australian, 3× premiership player, Coleman medallist, All-Australian captain
- Michael Hawkins
- Robb Hawkins
- Will Hayes
- Wilfrid Heron
- Maurie Herring – Premiership winner for Melbourne
- Herb Hunter – champion athlete, dentist and AFL player
- Alex Keath – AFL player and cricketer
- Graham Kerr
- John Kerr
- Bruce Lang
- Ed Langdon – Premiership winner for Melbourne
- Mark Langdon
- Tom Langdon
- Chris Langford – 4-time Premiership winner, Hawthorn Football Club captain and AFL commissioner
- Ron Larking
- Ben Long
- Ned Long
- Steven May – Melbourne premiership full-back, Indigenous all-star, 2× All-Australian
- Ken McKaige
- Peter McLean – 2-time Premiership winner for Melbourne and Carlton
- Ian McMullin
- Zach Merrett – Captain of Essendon, 3× best-and-fairest winner, 2× All-Australian
- Luke Mitchell
- Derek Mollison – AFL player and military officer
- Jeremy Nichols
- George O'Mullane – AFL player and cricketer
- Jackson Paine
- Leslie Rainey – AFL player, tennis player and cricketer
- Fletcher Roberts – Premiership winner for Western Bulldogs
- Brian Roet – Premiership winner for Melbourne
- Ken Rollason
- Ron Rutherford
- Ryley Sanders
- Cyril Seelenmeyer
- Jack Shelley
- Joe Shelley
- Peter V. Smith
- Ben Sordello
- Charlie Spargo – Premiership player
- Jim Sprigg
- Cyril Steele
- Ian Synman – Premiership player and prominent Jewish player
- Matt Thomas
- Andrew Thompson
- John Tilbrook
- Bonnie Toogood – AFLW Premiership winner for Western Bulldogs
- Athol Tymms – AFL player and doctor
- Ed Vickers-Willis
- Francis Vine – Premiership winner and captain of Melbourne
- Jack P. Walker – VFL player and soldier
- Josh Ward
- Fred Warry
- Russ Watson – AFL player, cricketer and athlete
- Mal Williams – AFL player and soldier
- Oliver Morrice Williams – VFL president
- Andrew Witts
- Barney Wood – AFL player, cricketer, motorsports driver and soldier
- Mike Woods

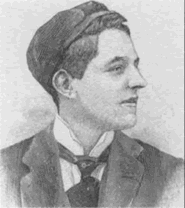
Edwin Flack was Australia's first Olympian in the 1896 Athens Games, running in his Melbourne Grammar athletics singlet.

=== Athletics ===
- Edwin Flack (OM 1890)– Australia's first Olympian and 2-time Olympic gold medallist
- Joel Baden – Olympic high jumper
- Sam Baines – youth record holder for 110m hurdles
- Dennis Duigan – Olympic decathlete
- Henry Frayne – Olympic triple jumper
- Corrie Gardner – national Australian hurdle champion, Olympic hurdler, and AFL player
- Peter Gardner – Olympic hurdler
- Lachlan Francis Gooley – Champion sprinter, represented Malvern in several meets through the late 1990s and early 2000s
- Sir Wilfrid Kent Hughes (OM 1914) – Rhodes Scholar, politician, Olympic hurdler, and organiser of the 1956 Olympics
- Herb Hunter – champion athlete, dentist, and AFL player
- Charles Lane – Olympic sprinter
- Jack Newman – Olympic middle-distance runner
- Fred Woodhouse – Olympic pole vaulter

=== Basketball ===
- Dane Pineau – centre for the Sydney Kings

=== Cricket ===
- Ted à Beckett (OM 1926)– test cricketer
- Richard Bell – English bowler
- John Conway – cricketer and AFL player
- Sir John George Davies – cricketer and mayor of Hobart
- Harcourt Dowsley – cricketer and AFL player
- Herbert Guthrie – cricketer and AFL player
- Alex Keath – cricketer and AFL player
- Wallscourt Kelly – bowler
- William Moule – politician and cricketer
- George O'Mullane – wicketkeeper and AFL player
- Ernest Osborne – bowler
- Robert James Parish – cricket administrator and Chairman of ACB 1966–1969 and a second term from 1975 to 1980

=== Field hockey ===
- Lachlan Dreher (OM 1984) – 3-time Olympic medallist
- Ms Danni Roche (OM 1987) – Olympic gold medallist

=== Golf ===
- Ivo Whitton (OM 1911) – 5-time Australian Open winner

=== Rowing ===
- David Crawshay – Olympic gold medallist
- Jessica Morrison – Olympic gold medalist
- Ben Dodwell (OM 1989) – Olympic medallist, and 9-time national champion
- Karsten Forsterling – Olympic silver medallist
- Andrew Michelmore – Rhodes Scholar, mining executive, and first Australian gold medal for rowing
- Clive Baillieu – businessman, public servant, and rower
- David Colvin – 10-time King's Cup champion and Olympic coxswain
- Simon Fraser – Olympic rower, first Australian Henley winner, and AFL player
- Lewis Luxton (OM 1929) – Olympic rower
- Timothy Masters – Olympic rower
- David Webster – 2-time World Champion coxswain
- Tim Webster – coxswain

=== Rugby ===
- Alec Boswell Timms – national rugby player for Scotland and the British Isles

=== Sailing ===
- Tom King (OM 1990) – Olympic gold medallist
- Simon Mckeon – champion yachtsman, businessman, lawyer, philanthropist, and Australian of the Year

=== Snowsports ===
- Cam Bolton – Olympic snowboarder
- Anton Grimus – Olympic freestyle skier
- Sir Wilfrid Kent Hughes – first Australian overseas skier
- Piers Jalland – Olympic tobogganist, colloquially known as “The beast of Buller”

=== Soccer ===
- Jason Davidson
- Stefan Nigro – A-League player

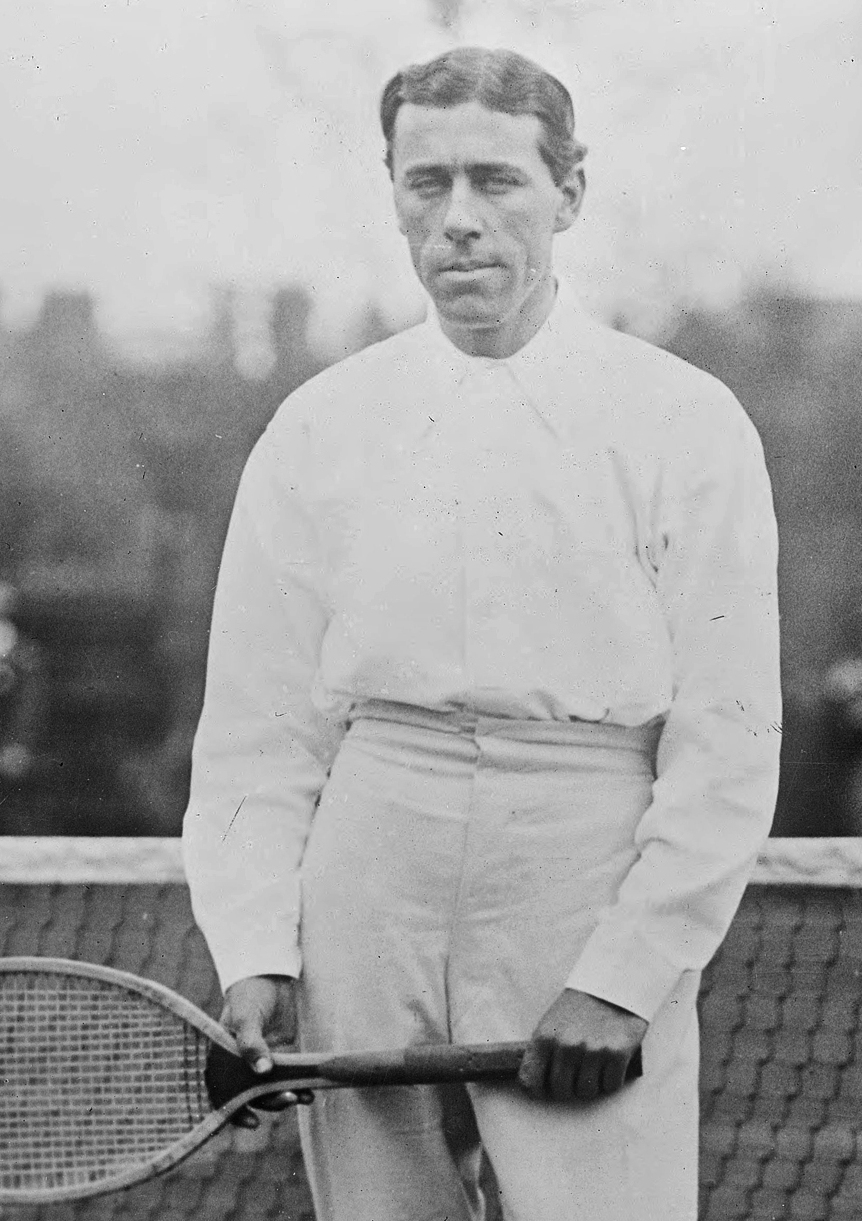
Sir Norman Brookes won Wimbledon (1907 and 1914), the Australian Open (1911) and multiple Davis Cups.

=== Tennis ===
- Sir Norman Brookes (OM 1895) – Wimbledon and Davis Cup champion, businessman, and eponym of Australian Open trophy
- Colin Long – 4-time Australian Open champion in mixed doubles
- Arthur O'Hara Wood – Australian Open champion
- Pat O'Hara Wood (OM 1910) – 2-time Grand Slam winner in singles and 6-time Grand Slam winner in doubles
