= Peter Cooper (disambiguation) =

Peter Cooper (1791–1883) was an American industrialist, inventor and philanthropist.

Pete or Peter Cooper may also refer to:

- Pete Cooper (golfer) (1914–1993), American golfer
- Pete Cooper (musician) (born 1951), English fiddler
- Peter Cooper (journalist) (born 1960), Internet publisher, financial journalist and author
- Peter Cooper Hewitt (1861–1921), American electrical engineer
- Stuyvesant Town–Peter Cooper Village, Manhattan, New York
- Peter Cooper (author) (1929–2007), British RAF pilot and author
- Peter James Cooper, American film producer and writer
- Peter Cooper (footballer) (born 1935), Australian rules footballer
- Peter Cooper (psychopathologist), British academic

== See also ==
- Peter Kuper, American comics artist
