= Rollason (disambiguation) =

Helen Rollason (1956–1999) was a British sports journalist and TV presenter.

Rollason may also refer to:

== People with the surname ==
- Ann Rollason (1760s–1846), printer and publisher in England
- David Rollason (fl. from 1982), English historian and medievalist
- Jon Rollason (1931–2016), English TV actor
- Ken Rollason (1928–2017), Australian rules footballer, son of Neville Rollason
- Luke Rollason (born 1992), British actor and comedian
- Mary Rollason (1764/5–1835), British businesswoman
- Neville Rollason (1895–1976), Australian rules footballer
- Renee Rollason (born 1989), Australian footballer

== Other uses ==
- Rollason Aircraft and Engines, British aircraft manufacturer
- Rollason Beta, a monoplane
