= Roet =

Roet is a surname. Notable people with the surname include:

- Brian Roet (born 1939), Australian rules footballer
- Haim Roet (1932-2023), Dutch Israeli Holocaust survivor
- Lisa Roet (born 1967), Australian artist

== See also ==
- Roets, another surname
