= Ernest Atkins =

Ernest Atkins may refer to:

- Ernest Clive Atkins (1870–1953), British soldier
- Ernie Atkins (Ernest Faram Atkins, 1890–1972), Australian footballer
