= Herbert Guthrie =

Australian rules footballer and cricketer (1902–1951)

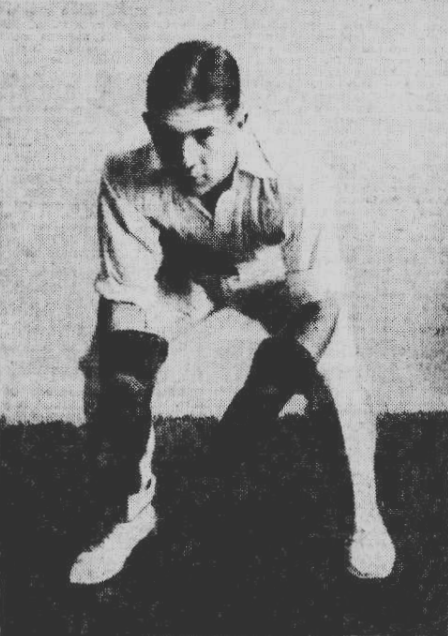

Personal information
- Full name: Herbert France Guthrie
- Born: 29 September 1902; Brisbane, Queensland
- Died: 26 January 1951 (aged 48); Bellevue Hill, New South Wales
- Original team: Melbourne Grammar
- Height: 171 cm (5 ft 7 in)

Playing career^{1}
Years	Club	Games (Goals)
1925	St Kilda	2 (1)
- ^{1} Playing statistics correct to the end of 1925.

Herbert France Guthrie (29 September 1902 – 26 January 1951) was an Australian sportsman who played first-class cricket for Victoria and Australian rules football with St Kilda in the Victorian Football League (VFL).

Guthrie, who was born in Brisbane, attended Melbourne Grammar as a kid where he played his early football. He appeared in two senior games for St Kilda during the 1925 VFL season, against South Melbourne at Junction Oval and Essendon at Windy Hill.

He also played a couple of first-class cricket matches with Victoria as a right-handed middle order batsman, both at the Melbourne Cricket Ground and with Tasmania at their opponents. His debut performance wasn't memorable but in the second match, during the 1929/30 summer, he made 36 in Victoria's only innings.

== See also ==
- List of Victoria first-class cricketers
