= Bruce Lang =

Australian rules footballer

Personal information
- Full name: Bruce Dennistoun Lang
- Born: 10 April 1889; Malvern, Victoria
- Died: 22 July 1974 (aged 85); New South Wales
- Original team: Melbourne Grammar

Playing career^{1}
Years	Club	Games (Goals)
1912	University	6 (1)
- ^{1} Playing statistics correct to the end of 1912.

Bruce Dennistoun Lang (Bruce Lane in some sources; 10 April 1889 – 22 July 1974) was an Australian rules footballer who played with University in the Victorian Football League in 1912.

The son of Alexander Bruce Lang and Florence Henrietta Hall, Bruce Lang was born in April 1889. He attended Melbourne Grammar School and while studying medicine at the University of Melbourne made six VFL appearances for University in 1912.

He enlisted soon after the outbreak of World War I, in August 1914, leaving Australia on 18 October 1914. He arrived at Anzac Cove on 3 May 1915 and after taking part in operations there returned to Australia and was discharged on 1 May 1916. He re-enlisted on 29 August 1918 and re-embarked on 16 October 1918, but the war ended before he arrived in Europe.

After returning to Australia, Lang became a farmer at Swan Hill after receiving land under the Soldier Settlement scheme. He died in 1974.
