= Roets =

Roets is a surname. Notable people with the surname include:

- Christiaan Roets (born 1980), South African rugby league footballer
- Clinton Roets, South African international lawn bowler
- Ernst Roets (born 1985), South African writer and filmmaker
- Le Roux Roets (born 1995), South African rugby union player
- Raynard Roets (born 2001), South African rugby union player

== See also ==
- Roet, another surname
