= Mike Woods (Australian footballer) =

Australian rules footballer

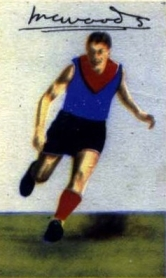

Personal information
- Full name: Mike Woods
- Born: 1 August 1926; Melbourne
- Died: 4 October 2017 (aged 91)
- Original team: Old Melburnians
- Height: 185 cm (6 ft 1 in)
- Weight: 89 kg (196 lb)
- Position: Ruck / Defense

Playing career^{1}
Years	Club	Games (Goals)
1949–53	Melbourne	72 (6)
- ^{1} Playing statistics correct to the end of 1953.

Michael Cranston Woods (1 August 1926 – 4 October 2017) is a former Australian rules footballer who played with Melbourne in the Victorian Football League (VFL).

Woods was born in Melbourne and attended Melbourne Grammar. In 1944, Woods joined the Navy and was commissioned to HMAS Nizam. In 1952, he graduated from the University of Melbourne with a commerce and social science degree. He furthered his studies at the London School of Economics.

At school Woods excelled in swimming and Australian football. In the navy he won a heavyweight title. After World War II, Woods played football for the Old Melburnians in the VAFA and in 1949 he joined the Melbourne Football Club in the VFL. He won the best first-year player award and played as a ruckman and defender. In 1950, Woods was selected to represent Victoria in the Australian National Football Carnival. He retired in 1953.
