= Wilfrid Heron =

Australian rules footballer

Personal information
- Full name: Wilfrid Ledlie Heron
- Born: 20 July 1894; Brighton, Victoria
- Died: 1 July 1942 (aged 47); SS Montevideo Maru, near Philippines
- Original team: Melbourne Grammar

Playing career^{1}
Years	Club	Games (Goals)
1913–14	University	23 (5)
- ^{1} Playing statistics correct to the end of 1914.

Wilfrid Ledlie Heron (20 July 1894 – 1 July 1942) was an Australian rules footballer who played with University in the Victorian Football League in 1913 and 1914.

Wilfrid Heron was born in Brighton, the second child of the prominent banker Herbert Ledlie Heron and Lilian Jessie Howard. He was educated at Melbourne Grammar School before commencing employment with the pastoral company Dalgety & Co. During this period he played football for University and after a goalless first season in 1913, scored five goals during the 1914 VFL season. A career highlight was scoring two goals against a strong Essendon side in Round 2.

He enlisted to serve shortly after the commencement of World War I, having already spent several years serving in the Army Reserve. He was mentioned in dispatches for "various acts of conspicuous gallantry during May/June 1915 at Gallipoli“ before he was shot and lost his right eye. He was invalided home but later returned to serve in France, was injured again, and then served in England as Adjunct at a Training Unit for the rest of the war.

After the war he became a plantation owner at Rabaul in Papue New Guinea. He married Madge Laurence Clapin in June 1929 but she died in January 1933, shortly after the birth of their daughter. In November 1934 he married Audrey May Clapperton and he continued to manage the Tovakundum Estate plantation in Rabaul, making frequent trips back to Melbourne.

He was taken as a prisoner of war by the Japanese after the Battle of Rabaul (1942). He subsequently died as a civilian prisoner of war when the SS Montevideo Maru, an unmarked POW ship, was sunk by a US submarine.
