= Barney Wood =

Australian rules footballer and cricketer

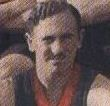

Personal information
- Full name: Percival Barnes Wood
- Born: 22 December 1901; Wellington, New Zealand
- Died: 9 June 1941 (aged 39); Litani River, Mandatory Lebanon
- Original team: Old Melburnians (MAFA)
- Height: 179 cm (5 ft 10 in)
- Weight: 81 kg (179 lb)

Playing career^{1}
Years	Club	Games (Goals)
1928	Melbourne (VFL)	5 (0)
1928–1929	Perth (WAFL)	20
- ^{1} Playing statistics correct to the end of 1929.

Percival Barnes Wood (22 December 1901 – 9 June 1941), known as "Barney", was an Australian sportsman who played both first-class cricket and Australian rules football. He was killed in action while serving with the Second Australian Imperial Force (AIF).

== Family ==
One of four children, and the son of Robert Ellis Wood (1866–1944), and Nellie Elizabeth Wood (1872–1943), née Heywood, Percival Barnes Wood was born in Wellington, New Zealand on 22 December 1901.

== Education ==
Educated at Melbourne Grammar School from 1911 to 1920, he was a prefect in 1919 and 1920, was the school's boxing champion on 1920, and played in the school's First XVIII from 1917 to 1920.

== Football ==
=== Old Melburnians (MAFA) ===
He played for Old Melburnians Football Club for several years.

In 1925, he played in the centre, and was one of the best on the ground, for a combined Metropolitan Amateur Football Association (MAFA) team against a combined South Australian Amateur Football League (SAAFL) team at the M.C.G. on 8 June 1925.

Although he had been selected in the 1926 MAFA team to play against South Australia, in Adelaide, Wood surrendered his position in the team as he was unable to leave Melbourne for the trip to Adelaide.

=== Melbourne (VFL) ===
Wood was recruited to the Melbourne Football Club from Old Melburnians in 1928; he appeared in five senior games.

=== Perth (WAFA) ===
He moved to Western Australia in 1928 for business reasons, where he played 20 matches for the Perth Football Club in 1929.

== Cricket ==
Well-regarded as a schoolboy cricketer, he played cricket for the Melbourne Cricket Club from 1921/1922 until 1928/1929.

He toured New Zealand with a Melbourne Cricket Club team in 1927; and, in a match against Taranaki, he top-scored with 75 runs. The score included eight sixes, five of which were hit in successive scoring shots.

At the age of 31, on 19 March 1932 he made his first-class cricket debut in a match for Western Australia against the touring South African national cricket team at the WACA Ground. He was dismissed for six in the first innings by Cyril Vincent and for two in the second by Denys Morkel.

In February 1932, when batting for the West Perth Cricket Club, he scored 132 runs.

== Boxing ==
He fought for the Amateur Welterweight championship of Victoria on 21 July 1923. He lost the bout to a controversial decision.

== Motor sport ==
Wood was also the joint holder of several Transcontinental Motoring records, established with Dr. Alan MacKay, in 1927, in an Essex Super Six.

== Military service ==
He enlisted in the RAAF in 1939, and transferred to the Army in 1940. Wood was a Sergeant in the 2/16th Battalion of the Second AIF. He was killed in action, on 9 June 1941, during the Battle of the Litani River.

From what I heard, he went out in the way you would expect of him – in the very van where things were hottest, and in front of his men he got what he was apparently destined for. No one could ever question his courage. I only wish I had half as much myself.
He was, I gather, wounded, and was being treated by the first-aid men, when a mortar came along and completely wiped out the whole party. He would know nothing about it. He met the finest fate a man can meet – a quick and painless death in the face of the enemy. We all know that this is the way he would have chosen it.

== Legacy ==
- Golfers in the annual Anzac Day event at the Royal Perth Golf Club play for the Barney Wood Memorial Trophy, named in Wood's honour in 1941. Wood had been elected the club's captain in 1935; and the cup had originally been presented to Wood, himself, at the end of his term as club captain.

== See also ==
- List of Victorian Football League players who died on active service
- List of Western Australia first-class cricketers
