= Ed Garlick =

Australian rules footballer

Personal information
- Full name: Edward Thomas Mervyn Garlick
- Born: 26 September 1883; Prahran, Victoria
- Died: 23 September 1935 (aged 51); Newtown, Victoria
- Original team: Melbourne Grammar
- Height: 177 cm (5 ft 10 in)

Playing career^{1}
| Years | Club | Games (Goals) |
| 1901 | Melbourne | 1 (0) |
- ^{1} Playing statistics correct to the end of 1901.

Edward Thomas Mervyn Garlick (26 September 1883 – 23 September 1935) was an Australian rules footballer who played with Melbourne in the Victorian Football League (VFL). In 1904 he was cleared to South Bendigo in the Bendigo Football League.
