= Ken Rollason =

Australian rules footballer (1928–2017)

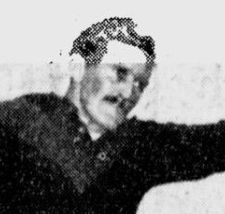

Personal information
- Full name: Kenneth Neville Cumstie Rollason
- Born: 12 July 1928; Ballarat, Victoria
- Died: 27 July 2017 (aged 89); Malvern, Victoria
- Original team: Old Melburnians Football Club
- Height: 193 cm (6 ft 4 in)
- Weight: 81 kg (179 lb)

Playing career^{1}
| Years | Club | Games (Goals) |
| 1949–50 | Melbourne | 11 (13) |
- ^{1} Playing statistics correct to the end of 1950.

Kenneth Neville Cumstie Rollason (12 July 1928 – 27 July 2017) was an Australian rules footballer who played with Melbourne in the Victorian Football League (VFL).

== Family ==
The second son of Geelong player Neville Rollason (1895-1976) and Mary Agnes (Maisie) Cumstie (1891-1958), Kenneth Rollason was born on 12 July 1928 at Ballarat, Victoria.

He married Valma Janet Johnson (1931-) on 2 May 1956.

== Education ==
Educated at Melbourne Grammar School, and already a tall lad, he played his first match for the school's First XVIII at the age of 14.

== Football ==
=== Old Melburnians (VAFA) ===
In 1948, while playing for the Old Melburnians Football Club (OMFC) in the Victorian Amateur Football Association (VAFA), he was selected in the Victorian team that played in Western Australia in the Third Amateur Football Carnival. Playing at full-back, he won the Grosvenor Medal, awarded to the Carnival's best and fairest player.

=== Melbourne (VFL) ===
Although he was originally "residentially bound to St Kilda", he was cleared to Melbourne from Old Melburnians on 13 April 1949, having resided in Melbourne's allotted territory for three years.

He played in 11 senior games for Melbourne (kicking 13 goals) over two seasons (1949 and 1950).

He left Melbourne halfway through the 1950 season when he made a business trip to England.

=== Old Melburnians (VAFA) ===
He returned to Old Melburnians in 1953, and was still playing for them in 1957. He was selected at full-back in the Old Melburnians Football Club's "Team of the Century".

== Death ==
He died at the Frances Xavier Cabrini Hospital in Malvern, Victoria on 27 July 2017.
