= Cecil Gordon McAdam =

Australian doctor and youth leader (born 1890)

Cecil Gordon McAdam (born 1890), known as “Doc” McAdam, was an Australian doctor, youth leader and co-founder of Lord Somers Camp and Power House. He served as a medical officer during the First World War and led the camp until 1954.

== Medical and military career ==
McAdam was schooled at Melbourne Grammar School and graduated in medicine from the University of Melbourne in 1915 and joined the British Army's Royal Army Medical Corps. He served in France, Salonika and Palestine and was wounded at Salonika. After his demobilisation in 1919 with the rank of major, he practised in St Kilda and served as an honorary medical officer to the YMCA.

== Lord Somers Camp and Power House ==
A district Scout commissioner, McAdam helped Lord Somers, the governor of Victoria, establish a camp that brought schoolboys and young industrial workers together through sport. The first camp opened at Anglesea in January 1929. McAdam took charge in 1931, when the camp moved to its permanent site at Somers on Western Port.

That year McAdam helped establish Power House in Melbourne so former campers could continue to meet and play sport. In 1932 he secured a site for a boatshed on Albert Park Lake, which became home to the Power House Rowing Club. McAdam retired as camp chief in 1954. In 1965 Lady Somers opened McAdam House, the organisation's war memorial clubhouse, named in his honour.
