= Cyril Seelenmeyer =

Australian rules footballer

Personal information
- Full name: Cyril Robert Seelenmeyer
- Born: 29 April 1892; Melbourne, Australia
- Died: 8 August 1918 (aged 26); Fouilloy, Somme, France
- Original team: Melbourne Grammar

Playing career^{1}
Years	Club	Games (Goals)
1914	University	6 (1)
- ^{1} Playing statistics correct to the end of 1914.

Cyril Robert Seelenmeyer MC (29 April 1892 – 8 August 1918) was an Australian rules footballer who played with University in the Victorian Football League. A veterinary surgeon, he served with the First AIF, dying of wounds on 8 August 1918.

== Family ==
The son of Adolphe Frederic Seelenmeyer (1855–1922), M.D. and Alexandra Mary Seelenmeyer (1863–1947), née Munster, he was born on 29 April 1892.

Although born in England, and a British subject, Adolphe Seelenmeyer, M.D. was the target of a lot of anti-German sentiment in Melbourne during the First World War; and, as a consequence, he, and his surviving sons, all changed their name to Seeley on 22 March 1920.

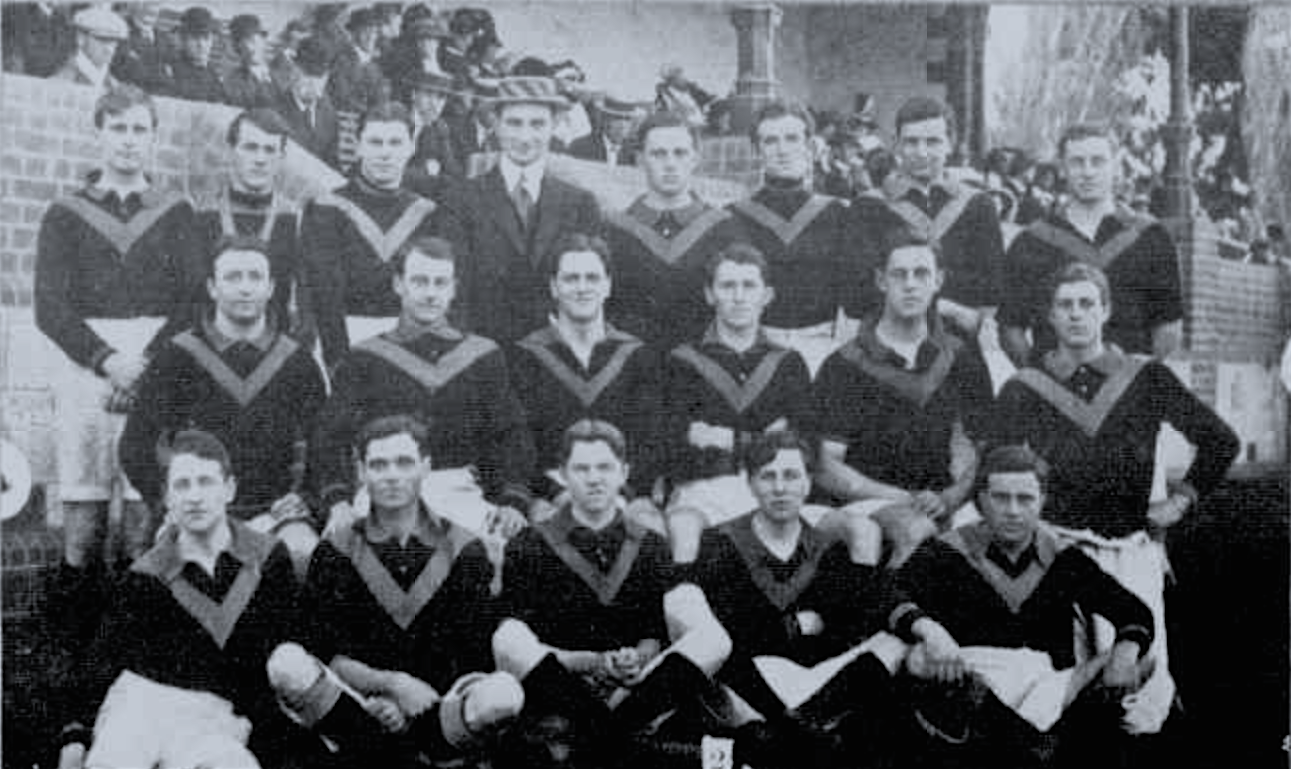
Melbourne University's's football team for the annual (inter-varsity) match against Adelaide University, played in Adelaide on 12 August 1914 (Seelenmeyer is at the far right of second row).

== Football ==
He regularly played for the Melbourne University team in the Metropolitan Amateur Football Association, and also played Inter-State football for the university in its inter-varsity contests. He was one of the university's best players in its 1914 inter-varsity match against Adelaide.

As well, he played six times with the University First XVIII in the VFL competition in 1914: making his debut on 2 May (round 2, against Essendon and, then, playing in five consecutive matches in rounds 14-18 (i.e., 18 July to 29 August), with his final match being the round 18 match against St Kilda on 29 August 1914, in which he was the best university player on the ground. Although showing great promise, his military service preventing him from playing any further VFL football.

He was awarded a full football blue at Melbourne University in 1914.

== Education ==
Educated at Melbourne Grammar School, he enrolled in Veterinary Science at the University of Melbourne in 1910. On the basis that he was enrolled as a non-matriculated student, he qualified for his "License in Veterinary Science" in 1913. He graduated Bachelor of Veterinary Science (B.V.Sc.) in 1914.

As a student he won the Royal Agricultural Society's silver medal.

== Military ==
Volunteering for service in the First AIF in August 1914 almost immediately after his graduation, and having been attached to the 4th Brigade, he served in the Middle East and in Europe with the Army Veterinary Corps during the First World War.

In October 1914, he was appointed Captain; and, on 16 April 1918, he was promoted to Major. He was mentioned in General Haig's despatches of 7 April 1918.

=== Military Cross ===
He was awarded the Military Cross "in connexion with military operations in France and Flanders" in the 1918 King's Birthday Honours in June 1918.

"For devotion to duty and most efficient service during the period 22 September 1917 to the 24 the February 1918 and including all the operation leading up to the capture of the Broodseinde Ridge (East of Ypres).
This Officer has performed his duties in an efficient manner notwithstanding shellfire and aeroplane bombing attacks to which the animals under his care were frequently subject.
It was largely owing to his ready assistance, care and skill, that the pack animals were enabled to keep the Batteries supplied with ammunition, notwithstanding their heavy expenditure during the above operations."

=== Death ===
He was wounded in action at Fouilloy, Somme, France, on 8 August 1918. He was struck by a flying piece of shell when attending some wounded horses. Wounded in both legs, and with one of his legs nearly severed from his body, he was badly mutilated, and due to shock and his extreme loss of blood, he died of his wounds about half an hour later.

== See also ==
- List of Victorian Football League players who died on active service

== Sources ==
- Holmesby, Russell & Main, Jim (2007). The Encyclopedia of AFL Footballers. 7th ed. Melbourne: Bas Publishing.
- Main, J. & Allen, D., "Seelenmeyer, Cyril", pp. 172–174 in Main, J. & Allen, D., Fallen – The Ultimate Heroes: Footballers Who Never Returned From War, Crown Content, (Melbourne), 2002.
- First World War Nominal Roll: Cyril Robert Seelenmeyer, Australian War Memorial.
- Australian War Memorial Roll of Honour: Major Cyril Robert Seelenmeyer MC
- Victorian Casualties: List No.426: Died of Wounds, The Argus, (Saturday, 31 August 1918), p.20.
- World War One Service Record: Major Cyril Robert Seelenmeyer, National Archives of Australia.
- WWI Pictorial Honour Roll of Victorians: Seelenmeyer, Cyril Robert.
