= Frank Dossetor =

Australian rules footballer

Personal information
- Full name: Francis Ernest Dossetor
- Born: 16 December 1885; Hobart, Tasmania
- Died: 8 November 1950 (aged 64); Bromham, Wiltshire
- Original team: Melbourne Grammar

Playing career^{1}
Years	Club	Games (Goals)
1909	University	3 (0)
1911	Melbourne	0 (0)
Total		3 (0)
- ^{1} Playing statistics correct to the end of 1911.

Francis Ernest Dossetor (16 December 1885 – 8 November 1950) was an Australian rules footballer who played with the Melbourne University Football Club. He was also listed with the Melbourne Football Club, but never played a game.

== Sources ==
- Holmesby, Russell & Main, Jim (2007). The Encyclopedia of AFL Footballers. 7th ed. Melbourne: Bas Publishing.
- Frank Dossetor's playing statistics from AFL Tables
- Frank Dossetor at AustralianFootball.com
