= Brian Roet =

Australian rules footballer

Personal information
- Full name: Brian Charles Roet
- Born: 2 November 1939 (age 87); Republic of Cuba
- Original team: University Blacks
- Debut: 6 May 1961, Melbourne vs. St Kilda, at MCG
- Height: 187 cm (6 ft 2 in)
- Weight: 83 kg (183 lb)

Playing career^{1}
Years	Club	Games (Goals)
1961–65, 1968	Melbourne	88 (1)
- ^{1} Playing statistics correct to the end of 1968.

Brian Roet (born 2 November 1939) is a former Australian rules footballer who played with Melbourne in the Victorian Football League (VFL) during the 1960s.

== Family ==
The son of Louis Roet (1906-1970), and Rena Constance Roet (1909-1995), née Wilson, Brian Charles Roet was born in Cuba on 2 November 1939.

His older brother, Michael Jacques Roet (1938-), a solicitor, played with the Melbourne Third XVIII in 1955, and was the captain of University Blacks in B Grade of the VAFA in 1958.

He married Prudence Mary Lane in 1965.

== Football ==
Anticipating that he may wish to return to the University team at some future time, he played in the VFL as an amateur.

He was recruited from University Blacks in the Victorian Amateur Football Association, and was centre-half back in Melbourne's 1964 premiership side.

He played a total of 88 games for the club. He left Melbourne in 1965, and played two seasons with the University Blacks, before returning to Melbourne in 1968 for one final season.

== Medicine ==
Educated at Melbourne Grammar School, and at Melbourne University, Brian Roet, M.B., B.D., D.A., who has worked as an anaesthetist and general practitioner, is now based in London. He practices as a psychotherapist, and specializes in hypnotherapy, and is a member of the British Society of Medical and Dental Hypnosis.

== Works ==
- Hypnosis: a gateway to better health (1986)
- All in the mind?: think yourself better (1987, 1994, 1996)
- A safer place to cry (1989)
- Personal therapy: how to change your life for the better (1996)
- The confidence to be yourself: how to boost your self-esteem (1998)
- Understanding hypnosis: a practical guide to the health-giving benefits of hypnotherapy and self-hypnosis (2000)
- Positive health: a practical guide to improving your wellbeing (2001)
- Feelings: exploring your inner emotions (2003)
