= Harcourt Dowsley =

Australian sportsman

Personal information
- Born: 15 July 1919; Essendon, Victoria
- Died: 30 October 2014 (aged 95); Melbourne, Victoria
- Batting: Right-handed
- Bowling: Right-arm fast-medium
- Role: Opening batsman

Domestic team information
- Years: Team
- 1937/38–1946/47: Victoria

Career statistics
Competition	First-class
Matches	5
Runs scored	336
Batting average	56.00
100s/50s	0/3
Top score	72*
Balls bowled	152
Wickets	2
Bowling average	37.00
5 wickets in innings	0
10 wickets in match	0
Best bowling	1/25
Catches/stumpings	3/–
- Source: CricketArchive, 31 December 2014

Harcourt Dowsley (15 July 1919 – 30 October 2014) was an Australian sportsman who played first-class cricket with the Victorian cricket team and Australian rules football for Carlton in the Victorian Football League (VFL).

He was born in Essendon, Victoria, the grandson of William Dowsley, a farmer from St Arnaud, Victoria, and Emily Dowsley (née Donnelly). Harcourt Dowsley's parents were Allan Harcourt Dowsley and Kathleen Olive Dowsley (née Gaetz). A brother, William Allan Dowsley, predeceased him in March 2014.

Dowsley made his first-class debut in a match against Tasmania at the Melbourne Cricket Ground in 1937/38 when he opened the batting and made scores of 46 and 72 not out. Tasmania would be Dowsley's opponent in all of his five first-class matches, the first three coming before his VFL stint and the other two after.

An Old Melburnian, Dowsley played his football as a full-forward and kicked four goals on debut in the 1941 VFL season, against St Kilda at Junction Oval. He kept his spot in the side for the next couple of games, kicking a further three goals, before joining the RAAF with whom he would serve in the World War II Pacific campaign as a Catalina pilot with the rank of pilot officer. When Dowsley returned from war he turned his attention to cricket and in 1946 played two first-class matches to finish his career with 336 runs at 56.00, including three half centuries. He also took two wickets at 37.00 with his right-arm fast-medium bowling.

He died in October 2014, aged 95.
