= Murray Clapham =

Australian rules footballer

Personal information
- Full name: Murray Clapham
- Born: 31 January 1939
- Died: 4 April 2011 (aged 72)
- Original team: Old Melburnians
- Height: 182 cm (6 ft 0 in)
- Weight: 83 kg (183 lb)

Playing career^{1}
Years	Club	Games (Goals)
1962	North Melbourne	1 (1)
- ^{1} Playing statistics correct to the end of 1962.

Murray Clapham (31 January 1939 – 4 April 2011) was an Australian rules footballer who played with North Melbourne in the Victorian Football League (VFL).
