= Audley Gillespie-Jones =

Australian rules footballer, born 1914

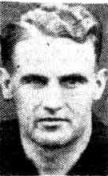

Personal information
- Full name: Audley Sinclair Gillespie-Jones
- Born: 1 July 1914; Swan Hill, Victoria
- Died: 7 May 2000 (aged 85)
- Original team: Old Melburnians
- Height: 178 cm (5 ft 10 in)
- Weight: 73 kg (161 lb)

Playing career^{1}
Years	Club	Games (Goals)
1935	Melbourne	2 (0)
1937–1942, 1945–1946	Fitzroy	49 (5)
Total		51 (5)
- ^{1} Playing statistics correct to the end of 1946.

Career highlights
- 6 votes in 1939 Brownlow Medal

Audley Sinclair Gillespie-Jones (1 July 1914 – 7 May 2000) was an Australian rules footballer who played for the Melbourne Football Club and Fitzroy Football Club in the Victorian Football League (VFL).

He practised as a barrister at the Victorian Bar. He also worked as a football writer for The Argus.

He wrote a series of books of legal anecdotes:

- The Lawyer Who Laughed
- The Lawyer Who Laughed Again
- The Lawyer Who Laughed Longer.
