= Andrew Witts =

Australian rules footballer

Personal information
- Born: 22 August 1961 (age 65)
- Original team: Old Melburnians
- Height: 183 cm (6 ft 0 in)
- Weight: 80 kg (176 lb)

Playing career^{1}
Years	Club	Games (Goals)
1985	Collingwood	7 (0)
- ^{1} Playing statistics correct to the end of 1985.

Andrew Witts (born 22 August 1961) is a former Australian rules footballer who played with Collingwood in the Victorian Football League (VFL).

Witts, who came from amateur club Old Melburnians, was already 23 when he played his only season at Collingwood in 1985. He debuted against Essendon in round 15 and remained in the team until round 21, for a total of seven games. His guernsey number in his first game, 65, was the highest ever regular number worn by a player in VFL/AFL history, although he wore 49 in his remaining six games.
