= Jack Atkins =

Australian rules footballer

Personal information
- Full name: Ernest John Atkins
- Born: 19 December 1916; Toorak, Victoria, Australia
- Died: 1 March 1942 (aged 25); HMAS Perth, Sunda Strait, off Java
- Original team: Old Melburnians
- Height: 184 cm (6 ft 0 in)
- Weight: 89 kg (196 lb)
- Position: Full back

Playing career^{1}
Years	Club	Games (Goals)
1940	Melbourne	4 (1)
- ^{1} Playing statistics correct to the end of 1940.

Ernest John Atkins (19 December 1916 – 1 March 1942) was an Australian rules footballer who played with Melbourne in the Victorian Football League (VFL).

He was an able seaman on HMAS Perth; and he died during World War II when HMAS Perth was hit by a Japanese torpedo during the Battle of Sunda Strait. His service number was PM2929.

== Family ==
The son of former University footballer, Ernest Faram "Ernie" Atkins (1890–1972), and Vera Ethel Atkins, née Clendinnen, Ernest John Atkins was born on 19 December 1916.

== See also ==
- List of Victorian Football League players who died on active service

== Sources ==
- Holmesby, Russell & Main, Jim (2007). The Encyclopedia of AFL Footballers. 7th ed. Melbourne: Bas Publishing.
- Main, J. & Allen, D., "Atkins, John", pp. 207–208 in Main, J. & Allen, D., Fallen – The Ultimate Heroes: Footballers Who Never Returned From War, Crown Content, (Melbourne), 2002.
- Taylor, Percy, "Melbourne are Proud of their Great War Record", The Australasian, (Saturday, 24 June 1944), p.23.
- Roll of Honour: Able Seaman Ernest John Atkins (PM2929), Australian War Memorial.
- World War Two Nominal Roll: Able Seaman Ernest John Atkins (PM2929).
- World War Two Service Record: Able Seaman Ernest John Atkins (PM2929), Australian National Archives.
