= Jim Sprigg =

Australian rules footballer

Personal information
- Full name: James Gordon Harvey Sprigg
- Born: 8 June 1896; Brighton, Victoria
- Died: 2 December 1988 (aged 92); South Yarra, Victoria
- Original team: Caulfield Juniors
- Height: 175 cm (5 ft 9 in)
- Weight: 67 kg (148 lb)

Playing career^{1}
Years	Club	Games (Goals)
1915	St Kilda	3 (1)
- ^{1} Playing statistics correct to the end of 1915.

James Gordon Harvey Sprigg (8 June 1896 – 2 December 1988) was an Australian rules footballer who played with St Kilda in the Victorian Football League (VFL).
