= Haim Roet =

Dutch-Israeli Holocaust survivor

Hendrik (Haim) Roet (10 July 1932 - 22 May 2023) was a Dutch Israeli Holocaust survivor. He initiated the “Unto every Person There Is A Name” memorial project which organizes public readings of the names of victims of the Nazis around the world.

== Early life ==
Haim Roet was born in Amsterdam on 10 July 1932 to Shlomo Roet and Johanna-Prince Roet.
