= David Gaunson (footballer) =

Australian rules footballer (1879–1946)

Personal information
- Full name: David Scott Gaunson
- Born: 3 September 1879; South Melbourne, Victoria
- Died: 7 March 1946 (aged 66); Kingsford, New South Wales
- Original team: Melbourne Grammar

Playing career^{1}
Years	Club	Games (Goals)
1898	St Kilda	1 (0)
- ^{1} Playing statistics correct to the end of 1898.

David Scott Gaunson (3 September 1879 – 7 March 1946) was an Australian rules footballer who played with St Kilda in the Victorian Football League (VFL).
