= Old Melburnians Football Club =

Australian rules football club

Old Melburnians

Names
- Full name: Old Melburnians Football Club
- Nickname(s): Redlegs, OMs

Club details
- Founded: 1920; 105 years ago
- Colours
- Competition: VAFA
- President: Chris Wischer
- Coach: Paul Satterly
- Captain: Jackson Paine
- Ground: Sportscover Arena, Elsternwick Park, Brighton, Victoria

Uniforms
Home	Away

Other information
- Official website: omfc.com.au

The Old Melburnians Football Club, also known as Old Melburnians, is an Australian rules football club composed of Melbourne Grammar School alumni, based in Elsternwick, Victoria.

The team is, along with Old Caulfield Grammarians, the (equal) second oldest consecutively competing team in the Victorian Amateur Football Association (VAFA) (the oldest being Collegians).

== Metropolitan Junior Football Association (1892–1911) ==
The Metropolitan Junior Football Association (MJFA) was founded in 1892. The foundation clubs were: Alberton; Brighton; Collegians; Footscray District; St Jude’s; St Mary’s; Toorak-Grosvenor; YMCA. Old Melburnians was admitted to the MJFA competition in 1896; the team withdrew from the competition at the end of the 1896 season.

== Metropolitan Amateur Football Association (1911–1915) ==
In 1912 the MJFA became the Metropolitan Amateur Football Association. In late 1915, the Metropolitan Amateur Football Association announced that it had suspended its competition, and would not resume the competition until the war had ended.

== Metropolitan Amateur Football Association (1920–1932) ==
Apart from its core function of delivering a competition for amateur footballers, the MAFA's teams had also provided an (unofficial) second-level competition for the VFL prior to the MAFA's decision to suspend its competition for the duration of the war.

The VFL Second XVIII competition began in 1919; the MAFA competition was not resumed, post-war, until 1920 — when, on Monday, 22 March 1920, a meeting of the Metropolitan Amateur Football Association decided to resume the inter-club competition that had been suspended for the duration of World War I. It announced that the re-formed competition would be between:

- Four "pre-war" clubs: Collegians Football Club, South Yarra Amateur Football Club, Elsternwick Football Club, and Melbourne University Football Club (later University Blacks), and
- Four "new clubs": Old Melburnians, Old Caulfield Grammarians, Melbourne Swimming Club Football Club, and the Teachers’ College Football Club.

=== 1920 ===
In its first MAFA match, Old Melburnians defeated South Yarra, 10.15 (75) to 4.7 (31).

=== 1929 ===
In the second last round of the 1929 season Old Melburnians played State Savings Bank at the Brighton Cricket Ground. At the conclusion of the game, one goal umpire had State Savings Bank winning by a point, while the other had the teams drawn. The time-keepers also thought that the match was a draw; and, as an interim measure, the match was declared a draw, and each team was awarded two points for the match.

Given the importance of the match's points allocation (two for a draw, four for a win) in determining which teams were eligible to compete for the 1929 season's premiership, the MAFA authorities met on 22 August 1938, considered the matter at considerable length, and ordered that the match be replayed on 31 August; which, of course, meant that the A Section semi-finals were postponed for a week. At the MAFA meeting on the following Monday it was determined that the match would take place, once again, at Brighton.

The replay match was played in a fierce wind, and Old Meburnians were soundly defeated by State Savings Bank, 18.19 (127) to 9.17 (71).

Old Melburnians (who defeated State Savings Bank in the semi-finals) played against University B (who had defeated Old Scotch in the semi-finals) in the 1929 A Section Grand Final. Although, perhaps, the far better team on the day, due to its atrociously inaccurate kicking, with 31 scoring shots to 19, Old Melburnians lost the match by 8 points: 5.26 (56) to 9.10 (64).

=== 1930 ===
Old Melburnians won its first MAFA premiership in 1930, defeating Elsternwick 23.16 (154) to 7.9 (51) in the A Section Grand Final.

== Victorian Amateur Football Association (1933– ) ==
In 1933, the Metropolitan Amateur Football Association changed its name to the Victorian Amateur Football Association. The VAFA competition was suspended after the first home-and-away round of the 1940 season, due to World War II, and resumed in 1946.

=== 1938 ===
Having been relegated from A Section to B Section at the start of the 1938 season, Old Melburnians won its first VAFA premiership in 1938, defeating Coburg 13.10 (88) to 12.10 (82) in the B Section Grand Final.

=== 1946 ===
When the VAFA competition resumed in 1946, Old Melburnian's were placed in B Section. The team lost the 1946 B Section Grand Final to Melbourne High School Old Boys (MHSOB) 18.13 (121) to 12.14 (86).

=== 1978 ===
In 1978, Ian Cordner was the captain of the Old Melburnian's B Section premier team, the B Section's leading goalkicker, and the B Section's best and fairest player.

== MAFA/VAFA Senior Premierships ==
=== A Section ===
- 1930: Old Melburnians 23.16 (154) defeated Elsternwick 7.9 (51).
- 1953: Old Melburnians 12.16 (88) defeated University Blues 6.8 (44).
- 1954: Old Melburnians 9.19 (73) defeated University Blues 9.14 (68).
- 1955: Old Melburnians 11.18 (84) defeated Ormond 6.12 (48).
- 1994: Old Melburnians 11.13 (79) defeated Collegians 7.19 (61).

=== B Section ===
- 1938: Old Melburnians 13.10 (88) defeated Coburg 12.10 (82).
- 1959: Old Melburnians 11.8 (74) defeated Commonwealth Bank 8.9 (57).
- 1978: Old Melburnians 18.16 (124) defeated Old Paradians 11.10 (76).
- 1982: Old Melburnians 18.7 (115) defeated Ivanhoe 15.12 (102).
- 1993: Old Melburnians 18.17 (125) defeated Therry C.C.O.B. 10.10 (70).
- 2002: Old Melburnians 14,9 (93) defeated Old Haileyburians 12.9 (81).
- 2009: Old Melburnians 18.21 (129) defeated Old Trinity 12.11 (83).

=== C Section ===
- 1976: Old Melburnians 12.22 (94) defeated Old Haileyburians 8.15 (63).
- 1988: Old Melburnians 11.10 (76) defeated Brighton Grammarians 10.10 (70).

== VAFA awards ==
=== Best and fairest in Section ===
A number of footballers from Old Melburnians have been voted the best and fairest player in their Section.

- 1939: E.J. Atkins — A Section.
- 1960: B.N. Kerr — A Section.
- 1978: R. Ian Cordner — B Section.
- 1996: Peter D. O'Brien — A Section.
- 2014: Thomas Paule — B Section.

=== Leading goalkicker in Section ===
A number of footballers from Old Melburnians have been the leading goalkicker in their Section.

- 1938: J.C. Cooper — B Section (100 goals).
- 1954: J. Duncan Anderson — A Section (75 goals).
- 1964: I.A. Murray — A Section (44 goals).
- 1976: P.J. Robertson — C Section (71 goals).
- 1978: R. Ian Cordner — B Section (50 goals).
- 1982: R.R. Cameron — B Section (74 goals).
- 1986: J.A. Mitchell — B Section (48 goals).

=== Big V Carnival Best Player Medal ===
- 1985: Rohan Brown.

== AAFC Awards ==
A number of footballers from Old Melburnians have awarded the Grosvenor Medal for the fairest and best player during an Australian Amateur Football Council carnival.

- 1948: Ken Rollason.
- 1950: Peter Cox.
- 1953: Bryce Thomas.
- 1982: Rohan Brown.
- 1985: Rohan Brown.
- 1994: Ian McMullin.

== Old Melburnians Football Club players who have also played VFL/AFL football ==
- Jack Atkins
- Dick Atkinson
- Rohan Brown
- Murray Clapham
- Peter Cooper
- David Cordner
- Harcourt Dowsley
- Audley Gillespie-Jones
- Stuart Griffiths
- Ken McKaige
- Peter McLean
- Ian McMullin
- Jeremy Nichols
- Ken Rollason
- Ron Rutherford
- Andrew Thompson
- John Tilbrook
- Francis Vine
- Andrew Witts
- Barney Wood
- Mike Woods (Australian footballer)
