= Ernie Atkins =

Australian rules footballer

Personal information
- Full name: Ernest Faram Atkins
- Born: 26 April 1890; South Melbourne, Victoria
- Died: 14 September 1972 (aged 82); Hawthorn, Victoria

Playing career^{1}
Years	Club	Games (Goals)
1913–1914	University	23 (7)
- ^{1} Playing statistics correct to the end of 1914.

Ernest Faram Atkins (26 April 1890 – 14 September 1972) was an Australian rules footballer.

Atkins spent his short career of 23 games, playing for University in the Victorian Football League (VFL). He kicked 7 goals.

Atkins's son Jack Atkins played for Melbourne.
