= Ron Rutherford =

Australian rules footballer, born 1906

Personal information
- Full name: Ronald McCrae Rutherford
- Born: 15 June 1906; Dubbo, New South Wales
- Died: 2 October 1986 (aged 80); Caulfield South, Victoria
- Original team: Old Melburnians

Playing career^{1}
Years	Club	Games (Goals)
1932	Melbourne	1 (1)
- ^{1} Playing statistics correct to the end of 1932.

Ronald McCrae Rutherford (15 June 1906 – 2 October 1986) was an Australian rules footballer who played with Melbourne in the Victorian Football League (VFL).
