= Mark Langdon =

Australian rules footballer

Personal information
- Full name: Mark Ian Langdon
- Born: 25 September 1927
- Died: 9 September 2014 (aged 86)
- Original team: Melbourne Grammar
- Height: 178 cm (5 ft 10 in)
- Weight: 76 kg (168 lb)

Playing career^{1}
Years	Club	Games (Goals)
1947–52	St Kilda	32 (5)
- ^{1} Playing statistics correct to the end of 1952.

Mark Ian Langdon (25 September 1927 – 9 September 2014) was an Australian rules footballer who played with St Kilda in the Victorian Football League (VFL).
