= Peter Cooper (journalist) =

British journalist (born 1960)

Peter Cooper (born August 1960, Salisbury, England) is a British businessman, journalist and author living between Dubai and Budapest. Cooper was editor-in-chief and a partner in the successful dot-com publisher AMEinfo.com sold to Emap plc in 2006, and subsequently a writer and freelance journalist based in the Dubai Media City. His latest book, 'Escape to Budapest: Moving to Europe's Coolest Capital', was published in May 2021. He became a UAE Golden Visa holder in 2022.

== Career ==
Cooper's long career in journalism started as the editor of his school magazine, the Old Wordsworthian. Later, Cooper worked in London for 11 years as a financial journalist on business titles including New Civil Engineer, Building and Construction News. He was twice IBP Business/Financial Journalist of the Year - securing a global scoop for the largest privatization in history, Russian real estate - and runner up for the BPA Newsletter Editor of the Year.

In 1996, Cooper left for Dubai to become the launch editor for Gulf Business magazine for Motivate Publishing. He returned briefly in 1999 only to write his first book Building Relationships, The History of Bovis 1885-2000 whose chairman—the late Sir Frank Lampl a concentration camp survivor—Cooper greatly respected and later came to know as a friend.

On a round-the-world trip in late 1999 he noted the success of a financial website in Australia and came back to Dubai to promote the idea. This became the news and business information website AME Info that attracted HSBC Private Equity Middle East as a significant shareholder in March 2005. In July 2006 the website was wholly acquired by Emap plc for a total of $27 million.

Cooper launched his financial comment website www.arabianmoney.net in 2010 and the pioneering investment newsletter ArabianMoney. In 2008 he published his second book Opportunity Dubai, and his third Dubai Sabbatical in 2010.

He was a regular columnist for The National, Abu Dhabi's English language newspaper and website, before retiring in June 2019 to concentrate on writing his latest book.

== Personal life ==
Cooper attended Bishop Wordsworth's School in Salisbury, whose alumni include the actor Ralph Fiennes. After completing his 'A' levels at Bishop's, Cooper went on to study politics, philosophy and economics at Trinity College, Oxford University. Cooper was chairman of the Oxford Student Liberal Society during the same term that William Hague was president of the Oxford University Conservative Association. In France, Cooper studied the French language in Tours and La Rochelle before becoming an administrative trainee in the Development Department of the European Commission in Brussels.

== Bibliography ==
- Building Relationships, The History of Bovis 1885-2000, Cassell & Co (2000) ISBN 978-0-297-82533-3
- Opportunity Dubai, Making a Fortune in the Middle East, Harriman House Ltd (2008)ISBN 978-1-905641-97-0
- Dubai Sabbatical, The Road to $5,000 Gold, Createspace (2010) ISBN 978-1-4505-6508-0
- Escape to Budapest, Moving to Europe's Coolest Capital (2021) ISBN 9798709561588
