= Peter Cooper (author) =

English author

- Born: 1929; Hampton, Middlesex, England
- Died: 2007 (aged 88)
- Other name: Colin Curzon
- Occupation: Writer

Peter Cooper Wing Commander, RAF, (1929–2007), is an English author who wrote witty detective stories and light verse under the name "Colin Curzon". His "Not tonight Josephine" was anthologized by J. M. Cohen.

== Publications ==
The Case of the Eighteenth Ostrich (1940)

Flying Wild (1941)

The Body in the Barrage Balloon (1942)
