= Ian McMullin =

Australian rules footballer, born 1964

Personal information
- Born: 1 September 1964 (age 62)
- Original team: Old Melburnians (VAFA)

Playing career^{1}
Years	Club	Games (Goals)
1984–1987	Collingwood	21 (24)
1990–1992	Essendon	24 (26)
1992–1993	Collingwood	4 (5)
Total		49 (55)
- ^{1} Playing statistics correct to the end of 1993.

Ian McMullin (born 1 September 1964) is a former Australian rules footballer who played in the VFL/AFL.

McMullin, an ex-Old Melbournian footballer, was recruited by Collingwood in the 1980s. As a half-forward he was a noted goal-kicker. In 1987 he was delisted from Collingwood. McMullin was drafted by Essendon in the 1990 Pre-Season Draft. After a few years at the Bombers, Collingwood showed interest once again, drafting him in the 1992 Mid-Season Draft, but McMullin only played another year; McMullin was released by Collingwood in 1993, after playing one game.
