= William Joynt =

Recipient of the Victoria Cross

William Donovan Joynt VC
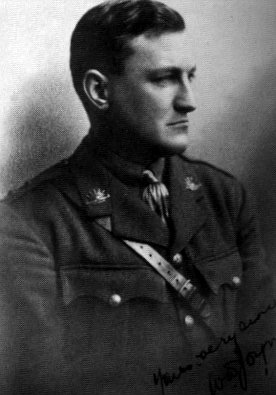
- Captain William Donovan Joynt, 1919
- Born: 19 March 1889; Elsternwick, Victoria
- Died: 6 June 1986 (aged 97); Windsor, Victoria
- Burial place: Brighton Cemetery
- Spouse: Edith Amy Garrett
- Military career
- Allegiance: Australia
- Branch: Australian Army
- Service years: 1915–1920; 1926–1933; 1939–1944
- Rank: Lieutenant Colonel
- Units: 8th Battalion
- Commands: 3rd Garrison Battalion
- Conflicts: First World War; Second Battle of Bullecourt; Battle of the Menin Road Ridge; Battle of Broodseinde; Second World War
- Awards: Victoria Cross
- Other work: Office worker, printer, writer

William Donovan Joynt, VC (19 March 1889 – 6 June 1986) was a printer, publisher, author and an Australian recipient of the Victoria Cross, the highest military award for gallantry in the face of the enemy given to British and Commonwealth forces.

== Early life ==
Joynt was born at Elsternwick, Melbourne and educated at The Grange Preparatory School and later Melbourne Church of England Grammar School. After working in a number of office jobs in Melbourne, in 1909 he sailed to Rockhampton and worked as a farm labourer in North Queensland, the Victorian Mallee, Western Australia and Flinders Island.

== First World War ==
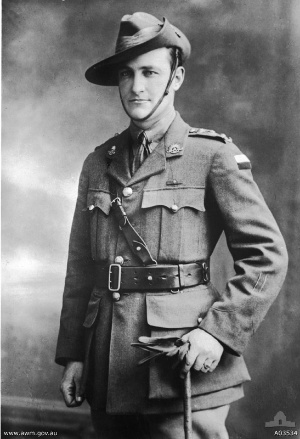
Lieutenant Joynt in 1918

Joynt enlisted in the Australian Imperial Force (AIF) on 21 May 1915, was commissioned on 24 December 1915, and arrived in France in May 1916. He fought in France until August 1918, where he was commended in divisional orders and promoted to lieutenant. He was wounded by a shot to the shoulder.

On 23 August 1918, Joynt was 29 years old, and a lieutenant in the 8th Battalion (Victoria), Australian Imperial Force during the First World War, when the following events occurred.

Lieutenant Joynt took charge when his company commander had been killed. When the leading battalion had been demoralized by heavy casualties, he rushed forward and reorganized the remnants of the battalion. Having discovered that heavy fire on the flanks was causing delay and casualties, he led a frontal bayonet attack on the wood, capturing it and over eighty prisoners, thus saving a critical situation. Later, at Plateau Wood, after severe hand-to-hand fighting, he turned a stubborn defence into an abject surrender.

He was badly wounded by a shell on 26 August and evacuated to England. He was promoted to captain in October 1918, and posted to AIF Headquarters in London in March 1919. He returned to Melbourne in February 1920, and was discharged on 11 June.

== Inter-bellum ==
Having studied agriculture and sheep-breeding in England in 1919, in 1920 Joynt became a soldier settler, dairy farming near Berwick. By 1929 he was pursuing business interests in Melbourne, where he was a pioneer of colour printing in Australia. About 1920 he had formed Queen City Printers Pty Ltd, and subsequently formed Colarts Studios Pty Ltd and bought the rights to a German colour-printing process. In the early 1920s he toured an exhibition titled The Pictorial Panorama of the Great War. Under various business names, Joynt remained a printer and publisher for over sixty years.

He married Edith Amy Garrett, a trained nurse, in a civil ceremony at Hawthorn on 19 March 1932, his forty-third birthday.

Joynt was one of a number of ex-servicemen who in 1923 founded the Legacy Club of Melbourne, the first of fifty Legacy Clubs. He helped lead the club's successful campaign to have Melbourne's Shrine of Remembrance built in its present form on its present site. He was active in the Militia in 1926–33, being promoted to major in February 1930.

== Second World War ==
Joynt was mobilised on 26 September 1939 and placed in command of Fort Queenscliff and subsequently Puckapunyal. From June 1942 he was camp staff officer then quartermaster at Seymour camp.

Having passed his 55th birthday, he was placed on the Retired List as an honorary lieutenant colonel on 10 October 1944.

== Post war ==
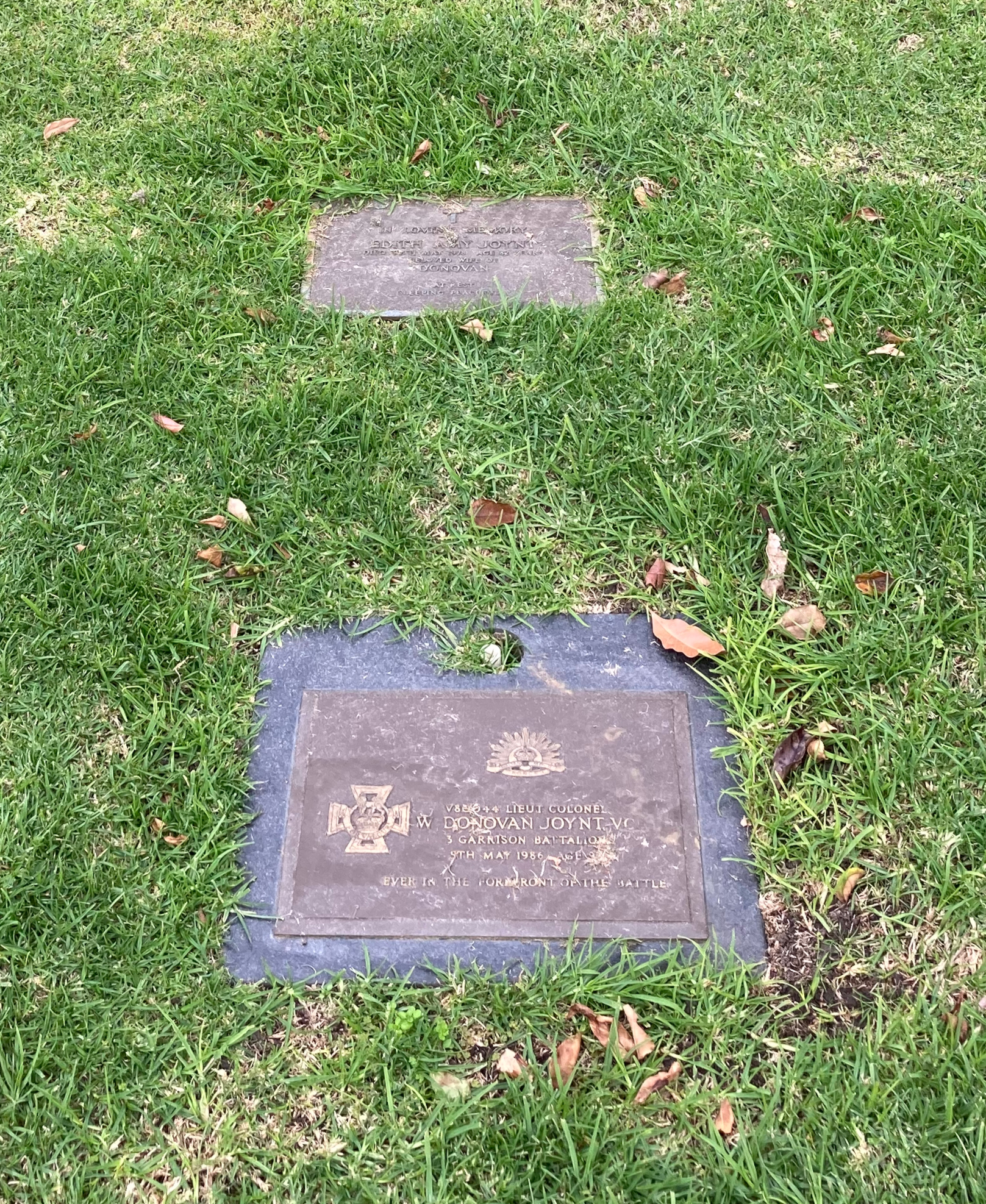
Joynt's grave at Brighton General Cemetery

Joynt and his wife rented, then bought, Tom Roberts' old home, Talisman, at Kallista and lived there until they built their own home nearby.

He wrote three books:

- Joynt, W.D. (1971). To Russia and back through Communist Countries. Lothian Publishing. ISBN 978-0850911145. – travel through the Soviet Union
- Joynt, W.D. (1975). Saving the Channel Ports 1918. Wren Publishing. ISBN 978-0858852020. – a regimental history of the 8th Battalion
- Joynt, W.D. (1979). Breaking the Road for the Rest. Hyland House. ISBN 978-0908090129. – autobiography

His wife Edith died in 1978. The last surviving of Australia’s World War I VC recipients, he died on 5 May 1986 at Windsor and was buried with full military honours in Brighton Cemetery. He had no children.
