= Rohan Brown =

- Born: 2 October 1957 (age 69)
- Occupation: Educator • football player
- Known for: Deputy Headmaster of Trinity Grammar School, Kew
Australian rules football career
Personal information
- Original team: Old Melburnians
- Height: 192 cm (6 ft 4 in)
- Weight: 89 kg (196 lb)
Playing career^{1}
Years	Club	Games (Goals)
1983	Carlton	2 (1)
- ^{1} Playing statistics correct to the end of 1983.

Rohan Brown (born 2 October 1957) is an educator and former Australian rules footballer. He played with Carlton in the Victorian Football League (VFL).
