= Peter Cooper (footballer) =

Australian rules footballer

Personal information
- Full name: Peter Cooper
- Born: 5 August 1935 (age 91)
- Original team: Old Melburnians
- Height: 180 cm (5 ft 11 in)
- Weight: 80 kg (176 lb)

Playing career^{1}
Years	Club	Games (Goals)
1954–55	St Kilda	3 (0)
- ^{1} Playing statistics correct to the end of 1955.

Peter Cooper (born 5 August 1935) is a former Australian rules footballer who played with St Kilda in the Victorian Football League (VFL).
