= Neville Rollason =

Australian rules footballer

Personal information
- Full name: Neville Alan Rollason
- Born: 16 February 1895; Heidelberg, Victoria
- Died: 5 March 1976 (aged 81); Merimbula, New South Wales
- Original team: Fairfield
- Height: 188 cm (6 ft 2 in)
- Weight: 80 kg (176 lb)

Playing career^{1}
| Years | Club | Games (Goals) |
| 1921–22 | Geelong | 5 (3) |
- ^{1} Playing statistics correct to the end of 1922.

Neville Alan Rollason (16 February 1895 – 5 March 1976) was an Australian rules footballer who played with Geelong in the Victorian Football League (VFL).
