= Melbourne Grammar School =

Independent school and heritage-listed buildings in Melbourne, Victoria, Australia

Location
- Melbourne, Victoria; Australia; 37°50′00″S 144°58′34″E

Information
- Former name: Melbourne Church of England Grammar School
- Type: Independent day and boarding school: Co-educational primary; Single-sex boys secondary
- Motto: Latin: Ora et Labora (Pray and Work)
- Religious affiliation: Anglican Diocese of Melbourne
- Denomination: Anglican
- Established: 1858
- Founder: Bishop Charles Perry
- Sister school: Melbourne Girls Grammar School
- Educational authority: Victorian Department of Education
- Chairman of the School Council: Prof Julian Smith
- Headmaster: Philip Grutzner
- Chaplain: Hugh Kempster
- Gender: Co-educational (P–6); Boys (7–12)
- Enrolment: 1,905 (P–12) (2025)
- Campuses: South Yarra and Caulfield
- Colour: Oxford Blue (navy)
- Affiliations: Associated Public Schools of Victoria; G30 Schools; Association of Heads of Independent Schools of Australia; Independent Primary School Heads of Australia; Association of Independent Schools of Victoria
- Alumni name: Old Melburnians
- Website: mgs.vic.edu.au

Melbourne Grammar School is an independent Anglican day and boarding school in Melbourne, Victoria, Australia. Founded in 1858 as Melbourne Church of England Grammar School by Charles Perry, the first Anglican Bishop of Melbourne, it educates boys and girls from Prep to Year 6 and boys from Year 7 to Year 12.

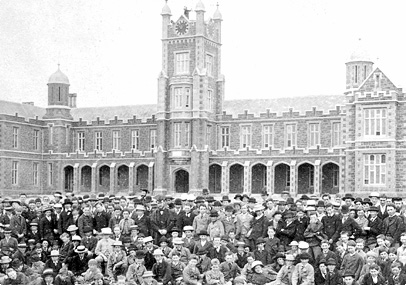
The school students and building, c. 1914

The school’s original campus on St Kilda Road in South Yarra, near the Royal Botanic Gardens and Kings Domain, houses Wadhurst, the middle school for Years 7 and 8, and the Senior School for Years 9 to 12. Its coeducational junior school, Grimwade House, is in Caulfield. In 2025, the school had 1,905 students across all year levels.

Melbourne Grammar is a founding member of the Associated Public Schools of Victoria (APS). Its sporting history predates the association: in 1858, the year the school opened, its pupils played Scotch College in one of the earliest recorded matches in the history of Australian rules football.

Former students, known as Old Melburnians, include three Australian prime ministers—Alfred Deakin, Stanley Bruce and Malcolm Fraser—as well as state premiers, judges and Rhodes Scholars. Other notable alumni include historian Manning Clark, entertainer Barry Humphries and Olympic gold medallist Edwin Flack.

== History ==
=== Foundation and early years ===
In 1849, Charles Perry, the first Anglican bishop of Melbourne, opened an experimental grammar school at St Peter’s, Eastern Hill. It suspended classes in 1854 while plans proceeded for a permanent school modelled on the English public schools. In 1855, Governor Charles Hotham granted the school 15 acres (6 hectares) on St Kilda Road, South Yarra. Perry laid the foundation stone in 1856, and Melbourne Church of England Grammar School opened on 7 April 1858 under its first headmaster, John Edward Bromby. Enrolment reached 136 by the end of that year.

Wadhurst opened as a preparatory school in 1886. In 1893, the school dedicated the Chapel of St Peter, Victoria’s first school chapel. During the economic depression of the 1890s, senior school enrolment fell from 272 in 1889 to 117 in 1894. Former pupils founded the Old Melburnians Society in 1893 to support the school.

=== The world wars and postwar rebuilding ===
Former pupils served in the South African War and the First World War with more than 200 Old Melburnians being killed in the First World War. In 1918, the gift of the Harleston property in Caulfield allowed the school to establish a second preparatory school, Grimwade House. The War Memorial Hall opened at South Yarra in 1928.

The outbreak of the Second World War in 1939 halted building plans and about 3,500 former pupils enlisted. Australian and American forces requisitioned school buildings, and some pupils moved to the country while others shared the remaining classrooms.

By the 1950s, much of the school still occupied the original St Kilda Road site. The Centenary Building Campaign of 1958 funded the first stage of a long-term building program across the Senior School, Wadhurst and Grimwade House. The school also acquired neighbouring properties to expand the South Yarra campus.

=== Reorganisation and sesquicentenary ===
Wadhurst and Grimwade House originally both taught pupils through to Year 8. Grimwade House admitted girls in 1979 and became the coeducational junior school for Prep to Year 6 in 1989. In 1991, Wadhurst became the middle school for boys in Years 7 and 8.

On 7 April 2008, the school marked its 150th anniversary with the opening of the Nigel Peck Centre for Learning and Leadership on Domain Road.

== Headmasters ==
The following individuals have served as Headmaster of Melbourne Grammar School:

- John Edward Bromby 1858–1875
- Edward Ellis Morris 1875–1883
- Alexander Pyne 1883–1885
- Ambrose John Wilson 1885–1893
- Frederic Sergeant 1894–1898
- George Ernest Blanch 1899–1914
- Richard Penrose Franklin 1915–1936
- David Stacey Colman 1937–1938
- Joseph Richard Sutcliffe 1938–1949
- Sir Brian William Hone 1950–1970
- Nigel Arthur Holloway Creese 1970–1987
- Antony James de Villiers Hill 1988–1994
- Andrew Paul Sheahan 1995–2009
- Roy Kelley 2009–2019
- Philip Grutzner 2020–present

== Campuses ==
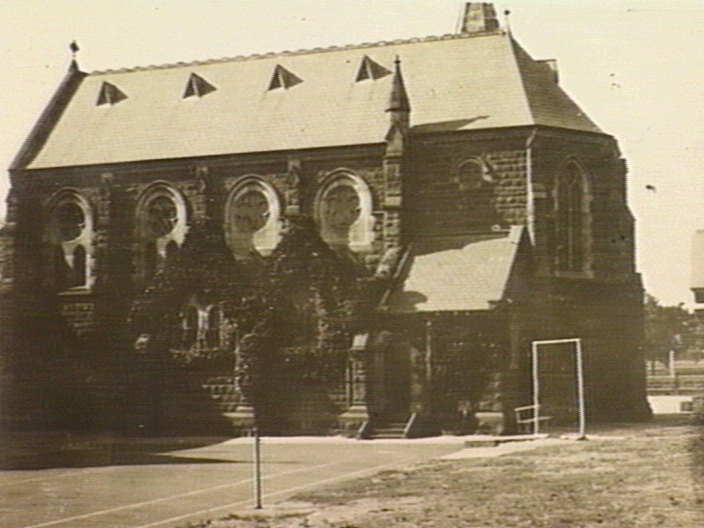
The school chapel, c. 1893

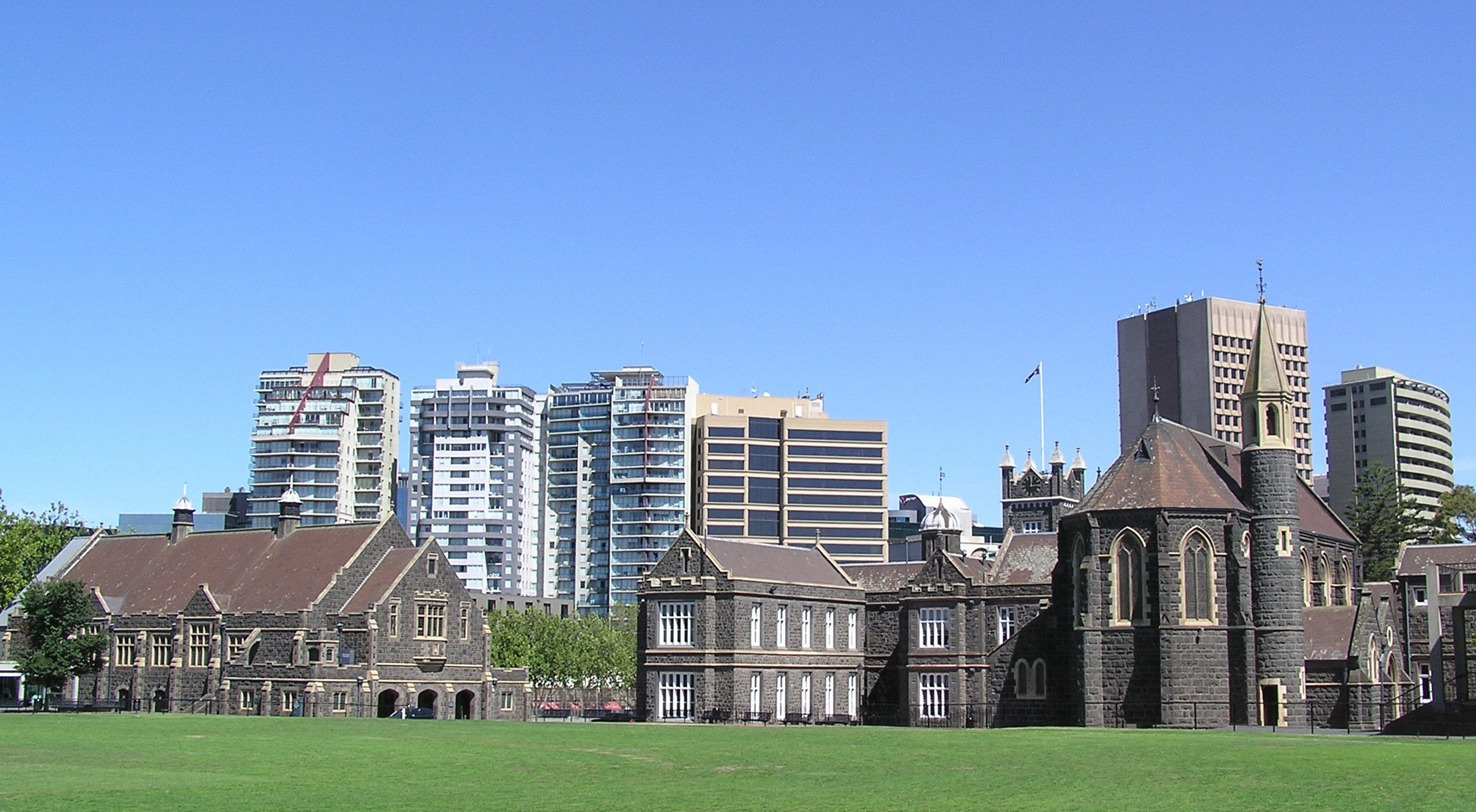
The school from Domain Road, South Yarra

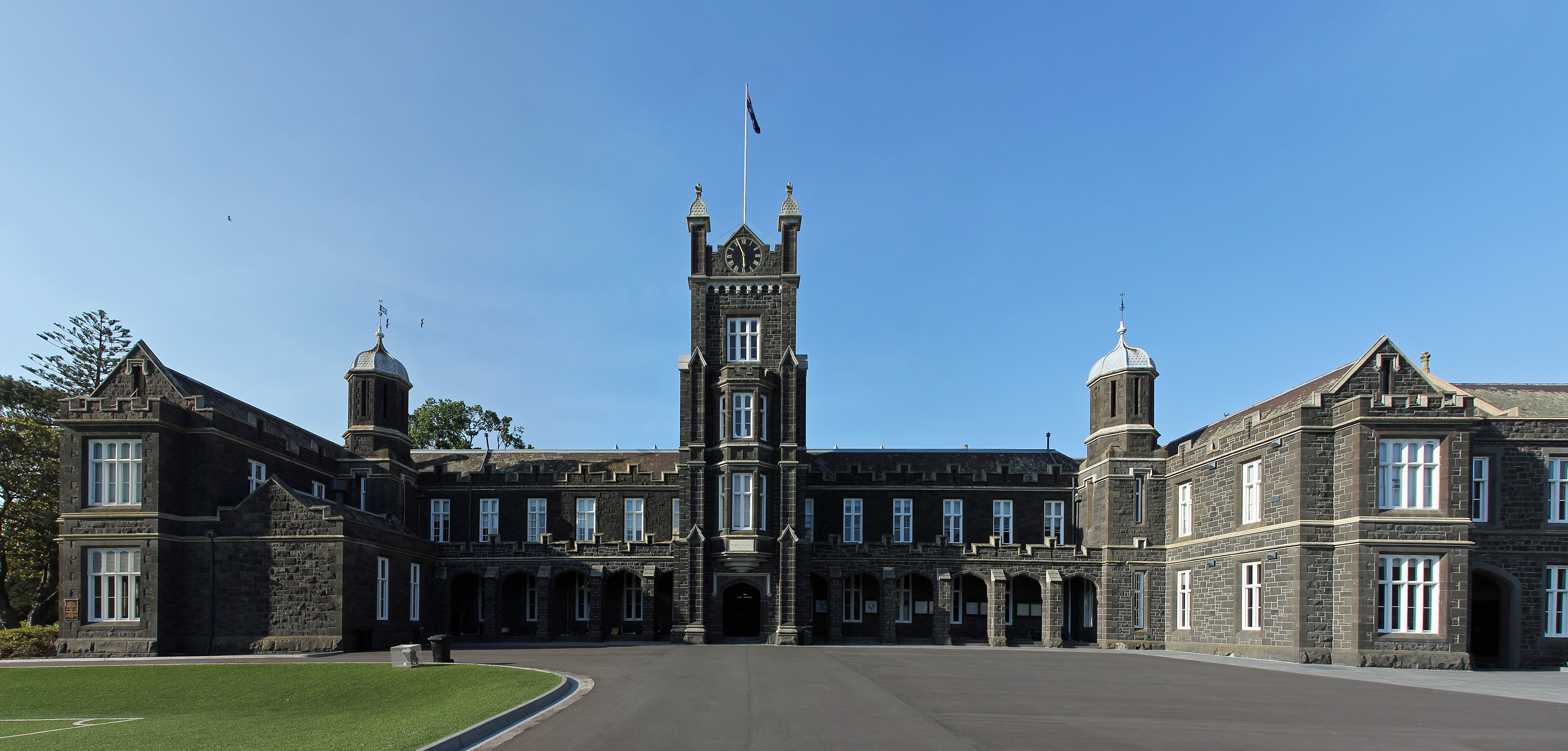
Witherby Tower

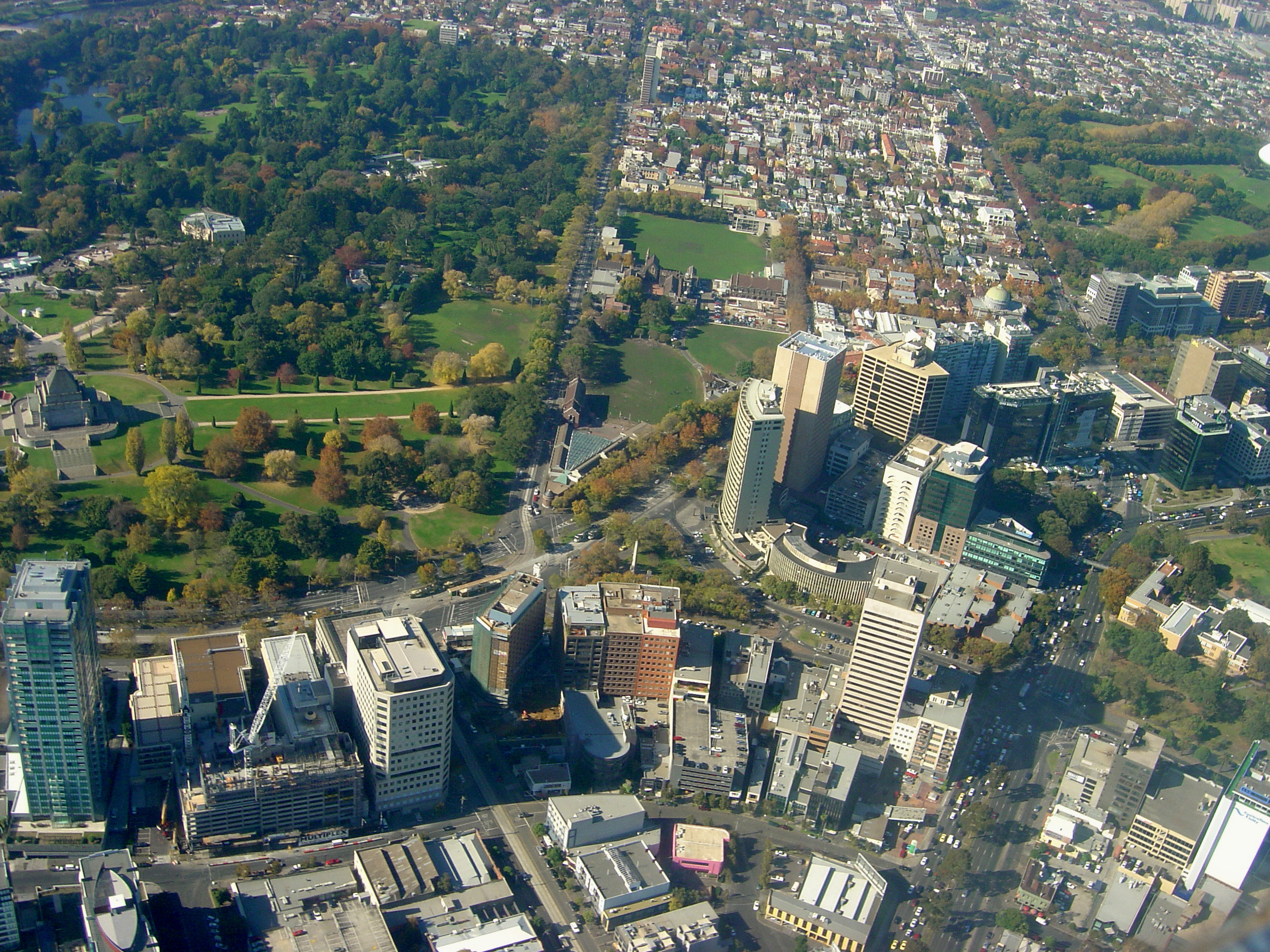
Aerial photo of the school's South Yarra campus and surrounds

Melbourne Grammar School features seven campuses, three used for everyday schooling, one for sporting activities, and three for the school's outdoor education program:

- Grimwade House – Caulfield (Co-educational; prep to Year 6)
  - Built as Harleston in 1875 in a Victorian Filigree style by the Hon. Frederick Sheppard Grimwade MLC, acquired by the school in c. 1911 – c. 1918.
- Wadhurst – South Yarra (All boys; Years 7 to 8)
- Senior School – South Yarra (All boys; Years 9 to 12)
- Edwin Flack Park – Port Melbourne (Sporting complex)
- Camp Dowd – Gippsland Lakes (Camp; Year 8)
- Robert Knox Camp – Woodend (Camp; Years 5 to 7)
- L. G. Robertson Camp – Breakfast Creek, Licola (Camp; Years 9 to 12)

== House system ==
=== Senior School ===
The house system provides pastoral care for students in Years 9 to 12. Students remain in the same house for all four years and meet daily with their tutor group. Where possible, siblings join the same house, and children of former pupils join their family's house. Houses organise camps, excursions and community service, and compete in debating, choral singing, sport and theatre sports.

Headmaster George Ernest Blanch established six houses in 1914 to encourage participation in sport and promote physical development. Boarders belonged to School House, while day pupils joined one of five houses according to where they lived. Bromby and Morris were named after the school’s first two headmasters, Rusden and Witherby after benefactors, and Ross after former pupils Jack and Hugh Ross. The school added houses as enrolment grew.

| House | Colour | Year Established |
|---|---|---|
| Bromby | Black | 1914 |
| Bruce | Red and White | 1961 |
| Creese | Silver | 2005 |
| Deakin | Green and White | 1961 |
| Hone | Orange | 1979 |
| Miller | Magenta | 1961 |
| Morris | Red | 1914 |
| Perry | Blue and White | 1952 |
| School | Royal Blue | 1914 |
| Ross | Dark Green | 1914 |
| Rusden | Yellow | 1914 |
| Witherby | Light Blue | 1914 |

=== Wadhurst ===
Wadhurst has five houses. Students are assigned to a house according to their choice of language subject. The three original houses—Caffin (yellow), Cain (blue) and Cuming (green)—were named after former students. A fourth house, Deakin, was added in 2017 and later renamed Wilhelm (red) in honour of Paul Wilhelm, a former head of Wadhurst. Brookes (purple), named after the Brookes family, was added in 2024.

=== Grimwade ===
Grimwade House has four houses: Austin (red), Grey-Smith (blue), Millear (yellow) and School (green). The house system dates to the tenure of Grimwade’s second head, Mr Walker. Austin, Grey-Smith and Millear take their names from members of the School Council. All pupils belong to a house. Where possible, siblings join the same house, and children of former Grimwade pupils join their parent’s house. The houses compete in swimming, athletics, cross-country and team sports.

== Curriculum ==
Melbourne Grammar offers its Years 11 and 12 students the Victorian Certificate of Education (VCE), the main assessment program in Victoria.

In 2004, six Melbourne Grammar students achieved the maximum possible Equivalent National Tertiary Entrance Rank (ENTER) of 99.95; only 32 students in Victoria achieved this ENTER. In 2005, five Melbourne Grammar students achieved this same ENTER of 99.95. In 2006, two Melbourne Grammar students achieved the maximum ENTER of 99.95, and three Melbourne Grammar students achieved an ENTER of 99.90. In 2007, three Melbourne Grammar students achieved the maximum ENTER of 99.95; again, only 32 students in Victoria achieved this ENTER. In 2008, five Melbourne Grammar students achieved the maximum ENTER of 99.95. This tradition was continued in 2009, when a record seven students achieved the maximum ENTER of 99.95. The school also recorded its best average score on record in 2009, with the median ENTER being 93.95. In 2010, three students achieved the highest possible ATAR score of 99.95 with median 91.5. In 2011, Melbourne Grammar School's VCE students have achieved a commendable 89.8 median ATAR score, and another seven students achieved the maximum possible ATAR of 99.95. In 2016, one student was awarded the maximum ATAR of 99.95, with five in 2018.

Melbourne Grammar School VCE results 2012–2023
| Year | Rank | Median study score | Scores of 40+ (%) | Cohort size |
|---|---|---|---|---|
| 2012 | 27 | 35 | 24.6 | 389 |
| 2013 | 29 | 35 | 27.9 | 383 |
| 2014 | 29 | 35 | 24.2 | 393 |
| 2015 | 41 | 34 | 22.0 | 386 |
| 2016 | 42 | 34 | 22.7 | 369 |
| 2017 | 42 | 34 | 22.8 | 379 |
| 2018 | 12 | 36 | 27.5 | 374 |
| 2019 | 28 | 35 | 23.7 | 388 |
| 2020 | 41 | 34 | 23.4 | 373 |
| 2021 | 21 | 35 | 24.5 | 371 |
| 2022 | 21 | 35 | 25.8 | 377 |
| 2023 | 20 | 35 | 27.1 | 385 |

== Co-curricula activities ==
The following co-curricula activities are offered to students in the senior school:

=== Debating ===
Melbourne Grammar has held inter-school British Parliamentary Debating competitions with Scotch College and Sydney Grammar. Additionally, Melbourne Grammar enters students into the Debaters Association of Victoria's (DAV) Debating Competition in the Caulfield region. In 2016, Melbourne Grammar won both the B Grade and D Grade competitions, and in 2017, won the D Grade competition for the second year in a row. In 2018, MGS won the A Grade championship.

=== Music ===
Music is taught across all three campuses. Students can join choirs, bands and string ensembles and take weekly private lessons in an instrument or voice. The annual First Term Concert brings together the school choir, string orchestra and symphony orchestra. Other regular performances include the Autumn Bands Concert, the Winter and Spring concerts, the Combined Strings Concert and MGS Jazz Night.

==== Symphony Orchestra ====
The Melbourne Grammar School Symphony Orchestra first performed in 1955 and made its first overseas tour in 1972. It has performed in every Australian state and toured Asia, Europe and the United States. Guest soloists have included jazz musician James Morrison and classical guitarist Slava Grigoryan. Pat Miller became conductor in 2019.

==== Chapel Choir ====
The Chapel Choir sang at the dedication of the school chapel in 1893. It draws choristers from Years 5 to 12 and sings at the weekly Choral Eucharist and the annual Festival of Lessons and Carols. The choir has also performed at St Paul’s Cathedral, Melbourne, and appeared in concert with the Australian Brandenburg Orchestra from 2009 to 2011.

=== Theatre ===
Melbourne Grammar’s Senior School stages three productions each year. The first-term Quad Play, open to students in Years 10 to 12, is performed in the school quadrangle and usually features a work by Shakespeare. A production of Julius Caesar marked its 50th anniversary in 2024.

The School Play takes place in the Memorial Hall each August and alternates between plays and musicals. Staff and students build the sets, and students from Melbourne Girls Grammar sometimes join the cast. Past productions include Amadeus (2014), One Man, Two Guvnors (2019) and Guys and Dolls (2022). The Spring Production, for students in Years 9 and 10, is staged off campus in the fourth term while the hall is used for VCE examinations.

Wadhurst, the middle school, also stages an annual production. In 2008, Glimpses of the Generations traced the school’s first 150 years. The separate Year 8 Project brings students from Melbourne Grammar and Melbourne Girls Grammar together to develop, produce and perform a play. It began in 2012 with an adaptation of A Midsummer Night’s Dream.

=== Outdoor education ===
Melbourne Grammar’s outdoor education program runs from Prep to Year 10. Year 7 students camp with their house groups at Robert Knox Camp near Woodend. In Year 8, students travel through the Gippsland Lakes region on foot, by sea kayak and by mountain bike, staying at Camp Dowd. Year 9 options include rafting on the Snowy River and mountain biking at Mount Stirling.

==== Leslie Gladstone Robertson Society ====
Founded in 1959 as a bushwalking club, the Leslie Gladstone Robertson (LGR) Society is open to students in Years 9 to 12. It organises voluntary weekend and school holiday trips. Bushwalking and camping remain its main activities, alongside skiing, mountain biking and rogaining. Students in Years 11 and 12 often lead small hiking groups, taking responsibility for navigation and the welfare of the group.

==== Beyond the Gates ====
Introduced in 2011, Beyond the Gates is a three-week expedition for all Year 10 students. Groups follow one of three routes. The Classic combines bushwalking, rafting and cycling between Mount Hotham and the Mount Kosciuszko region. The Alpine Journey runs from Tharwa to Kiandra and includes canoeing on Lake Eucumbene. The Karri to Coast route crosses the forests, dunes and inlets of south-western Australia. Each expedition includes a 36-hour solo camp, with group leaders nearby.

== Sport ==
==== APS Premierships ====
As of 2026, Melbourne Grammar has won the following APS Premierships:

| Sport | Number of premierships | Years won |
|---|---|---|
| Athletics | 30 | 1905, 1908, 1909, 1918, 1920, 1921, 1922, 1923, 1924, 1925, 1927, 1929, 1930, 1931, 1932, 1933, 1934, 1937, 1938, 1939, 1941, 1943, 1948, 1950, 1952, 1956, 1960, 1962, 2010, 2016, 2024 |
| Cricket | 38 | 1894, 1895, 1896, 1897, 1902, 1904, 1905, 1907, 1908, 1909, 1911, 1912, 1913, 1914, 1915, 1918, 1920, 1921, 1922, 1925, 1926, 1927, 1929, 1930, 1931, 1932, 1937, 1940, 1943, 1944, 1948, 1957, 1959, 1965, 1976, 2008, 2016, 2022, 2026 |
| Field hockey | 8 | 1991, 1995, 2011, 2012, 2014, 2021, 2022, 2023 |
| Football | 35 | 1893, 1901, 1905, 1906, 1911, 1912, 1919, 1920, 1921, 1923, 1926, 1928, 1929, 1931, 1934, 1935, 1936, 1938, 1940, 1941, 1944, 1946, 1948, 1949, 1950, 1951, 1952, 1957, 1964, 1970, 1976, 1982, 1995, 2008, 2013 |
| Rowing | 28 | 1870, 1871, 1877, 1883, 1897, 1916, 1918, 1923, 1930, 1931, 1932, 1938, 1939, 1940, 1943, 1945, 1949, 1958, 1964, 1968, 1979, 1980, 1981, 1982, 1997, 2002, 2009, 2016 |
| Volleyball | 3 | 2006, 2008, 2016 |
| Water Polo | 6 | 2005, 2006, 2007, 2008, 2009, 2023 |

==== Athletics ====
Melbourne Grammar students compete in inter-house athletics and represent the school in Associated Public Schools of Victoria (APS) competition. Some students also train and compete with the Old Melburnians Athletics Club (OMAC) in track and field and cross-country.

OMAC traces its origins to the Hare and Hounds Club, founded in 1892 and re-formed under its present name in 1927. Its original members included Edwin Flack (OM 1890), who won the 800 metres and 1,500 metres at the 1896 Athens Olympics.

==== Australian rules football ====
Melbourne Grammar offers Australian rules football to students at all year levels. Its senior team, the First XVIII, competes in the Associated Public Schools of Victoria (APS) football competition.

On 7 August 1858, Melbourne Grammar and Scotch College began one of the earliest recorded matches in the history of Australian rules football. Played at Richmond Paddock, beside the Melbourne Cricket Ground, the match took place over three Saturdays and ended in a draw, with each side scoring one goal. Since 1989, the two schools have contested the Cordner–Eggleston Cup in their annual match. The trophy honours Don Cordner, a Melbourne Grammar alumnus who won the 1946 Brownlow Medal, and Mick Eggleston, a Scotch alumnus who played for and coached the Old Scotch Football Club.

Many Old Melburnians have played in the Victorian Football League (VFL), later renamed the Australian Football League (AFL). They include the Cordner brothers at Melbourne, Chris Langford at Hawthorn, Tom Hawkins at Geelong and Zach Merrett at Essendon.

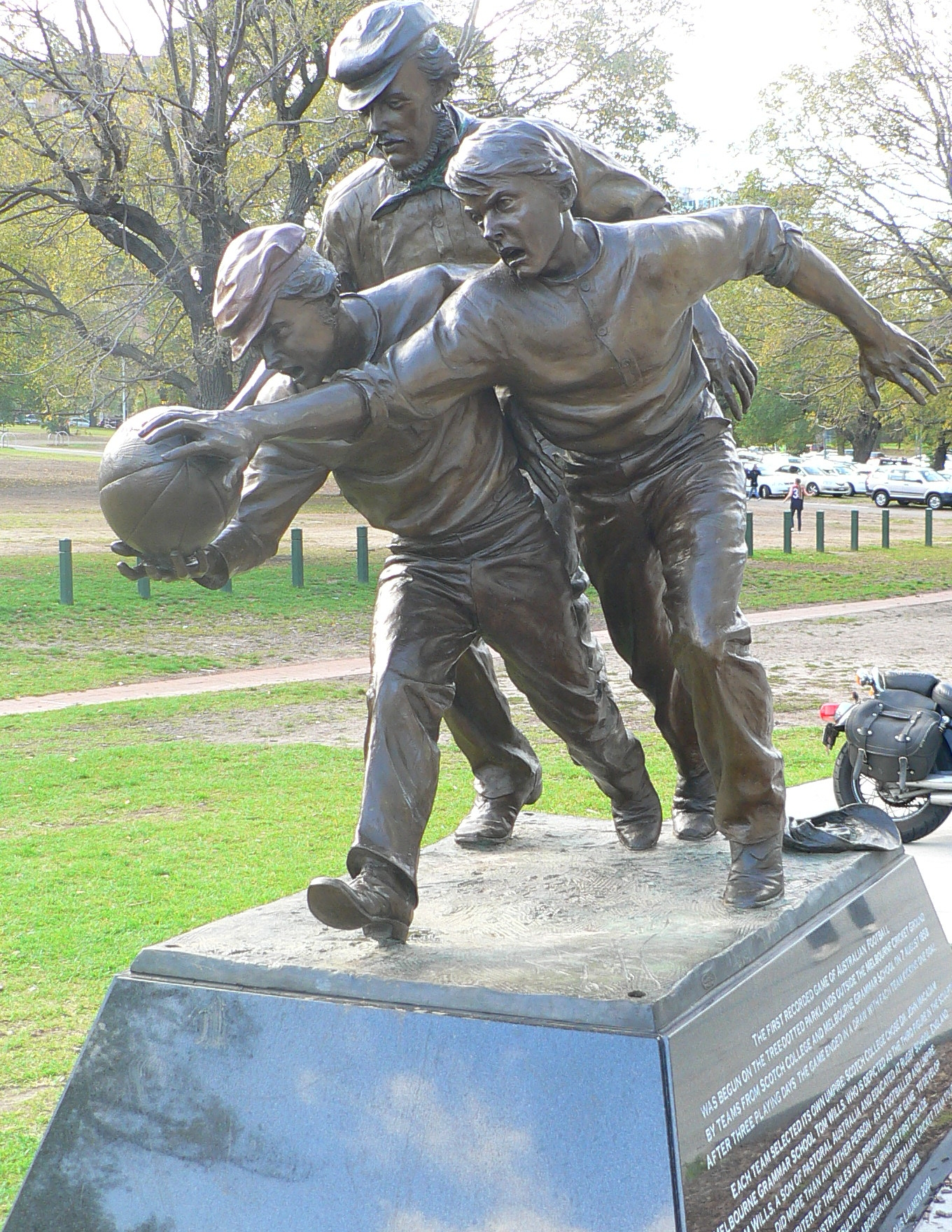
Statue at the Melbourne Cricket Ground of Tom Wills umpiring the first recorded match of Australian rules football between Scotch College and Melbourne Grammar

==== Basketball ====
Melbourne Grammar is in the Victorian APS Basketball Competition, finishing 3rd in 2012 and 2014. Recent noteworthy players include Dane Pineau (recruited by St Marys College US), 2012 Captain and also Captain of the Australian under-19s national team, Daniel Fisher, who went on to attend American University on a scholarship and Victorian State and BigV men's players Jakob Cornelissen (recruited by University of Hawaii US) and Andrew Panyiotou.

==== Cricket ====
Melbourne Grammar School competed in an annual cricket competition with Sydney Grammar from 1876 to 1998, which was dubbed "The Bat". The competition is the oldest interstate rivalry in Australia, predating even the Ashes. Melbourne Grammar has won the competition 61 times, and Sydney Grammar has won it 57 times, with four draws and one tie. In 1998 the competition was changed to include Brisbane Grammar and named the Tri-Grammar Shield. Since the inception of the Shield, Melbourne Grammar has won 10 times, Brisbane Grammar six times, and Sydney Grammar five times. The 1st XI Cricket team tours the UK bi-annually.

==== Field hockey ====
The MGS Hockey team has won the APS Hockey Competition, most recently in 2022. Boys who play in a Premiership-winning team are awarded with a ceremonial wooden hockey stick to commemorate their efforts. Many boys have come through the program including Duncan Jackson who have moved onto the international stage.

==== Football (soccer) ====
Soccer is currently one of the most played sports at the school, with twelve teams fielded in the APS Soccer Competition.

The Melbourne Grammar 1st XI Soccer team is yet to win an APS premiership. Following the hiring of VIS youth coach Ernie Merrick in 2000, the 1st XI began a steady improvement in subsequent years, leading to a third-placed finish in a tightly contested 2014 season and subsequently missed out on winning the premiership cup following a draw against the reigning premiers, Brighton Grammar. The strong performances of the 1st XI, as seen in 2014 and 2015, have partly been due to the guidance of Jesper Olsen, former Manchester United and Danish International winger.

Salvatore Sitch won the "MVP" award for the 1st XI in 2015. Lloyd Skinner, known for scoring as a goalkeeper, won the same award in 2018, followed by Rowan Marshall in 2019 and more recently Josh Wills winning the "MVP" for the whole APS

In recent years, Melbourne Grammar School has produced A-League footballers including Stefan Nigro (Melbourne Victory), who received Man of The Match on debut against Brisbane Roar, and Yaren Sözer (Melbourne City FC) who played against EPL giants Manchester City. Furthermore, Old Melburnians have signed for overseas clubs in Spain.

Rose and Thistle Cup

The Rose and Thistle Cup is traditionally the match of the Melbourne Grammar Soccer 1st XI and the Scotch College 1st XI. Inaugurated in 2008, it represents the Rose of England (symbolising Melbourne Grammar School's origins) and the Thistle of Scotland (symboling the roots of Scotch College). The Cup has an annual theme of 'Two Traditions, One Spirit.'

==== Rowing ====
Melbourne Grammar Boat House is located on Boarhouse Drive on the south bank of the Yarra River.

Students start rowing in Year 8 and the sport is offered to boys in Senior School. The first boat race between Melbourne Grammar and Scotch College took place in June 1868, with the annual race becoming the Head of the River races now including all APS schools. Melbourne Grammar has a proud rowing record, with its 1st VIII claiming the Head of the River 28 times, the most recent occasion being in 2016. In 2009 the school had an exceptional 1st VIII who broke the Head of the River record. They also won the National Schoolboy 8+ over the Shore School in a record time of 5:49. The 2016 MGS 1st VIII, having won the Head of the River title, went on to compete at the Henley Royal Regatta in the UK, in the Princess Elizabeth Challenge Cup. The crew were inaugural winners of the Leander Club Challenge Cup. The school's boat shed is located on the Yarra River

==== Snowsports ====
Melbourne Grammar School has won 18 out of the last 19 Victorian APS Snowsports Cups.

==== Volleyball ====
Melbourne Grammar School's highest placing in the APS Volleyball Competition is 1st in 2016 and students have gone on to play at State levels. Most recently led by 6'7 Utility Hitter/Setter Sebastian Herbst who currently plays collegiate volleyball at Cumberland University. He is the first Melbourne Grammar Student to attend university in the United States of America on a volleyball scholarship.

== Crest and motto ==
Collectable School Cigarette card featuring the MGS colours & crest, c. 1910s

The school motto, Ora et Labora, which may be translated from Latin to "Pray and Work", was chosen by the second headmaster, Edward Morris, in 1875. An old boy of England's Rugby School, Morris believed in the principles of the English Public School system, including that education and religion should go hand in hand, as envisaged by Bishop Perry.

The school crest is composed of a number of elements. The Archbishop's mitre placed on top of the crest indicates the school's connection with the Church of England; the mitre in the shield is in memory of Charles Perry, the school's founder; the open book represents either the bible or 'Knowledge like an Open Book', while its large clasps show that the book is not to be opened with ease; the Fleur de Lys (lily) is a symbol of purity; and the Southern Cross is the emblem of Australia, and is also on the Victorian and Australian flags.

== School Games Song ==
The school's Games Song is "Play Together, Dark Blue Twenty", sung to the tune of Men of Harlech. It is one of the oldest fight songs in Australia. Ambrose John Wilson, headmaster of the school from 1885 to 1893, wrote lyrics. The lyrics cover the school's three main sports in the late-19th century: Australian rules football, cricket and rowing.

== Alumni ==
The Old Melburnians Society Crest

=== The Old Melburnians Society ===
The Old Melburnians Society is the alumni association of Melbourne Grammar School. Former students are known as Old Melburnians (abbreviated to OM followed by the peer year), and become members automatically on leaving the school. The Society’s alumni community numbers almost 18,000 people in more than 55 countries.

The term “Old Melburnians” was first applied to the school’s alumni in 1890, and the Society was formally established in 1893. Membership was opened to women after the school began educating girls at Grimwade House in 1979, and the Society has since reported 942 female Old Melburnians.

The Society is governed by the Old Melburnians Council. Its annual calendar includes class reunions, a business breakfast, an annual dinner, an ANZAC service of commemoration, and the Annual Bluestone Lunch for alumni who left the school 50 or more years ago.

Several sporting clubs draw on the alumni body, including the Old Melburnians Football Club, an Australian rules football club of Melbourne Grammar alumni based in Elsternwick.

=== Notable Alumni ===
In 2008 to mark the school's sesquicentenary, 150 of the school's notable alumni were selected for its 'Talents Committed' exhibition. Some of those included were:

- Richard Casey (OM 1908) - Governor-General of Australia
- Alfred Deakin (OM 1871) – Prime Minister of Australia
- Stanley Bruce (OM 1901) – Prime Minister of Australia
- Malcolm Fraser (OM 1948) OM 1948 – Prime Minister of Australia
- Sir Rupert Hamer (OM 1929) – Premier of Victoria
- John Brumby (OM 1970)– Premier of Victoria
- Ted Baillieu (OM 1970) – Premier of Victoria
- William Joynt VC (OM 1904) – Victoria Cross recipient
- Bill Newton VC (OM 1937) – Victoria Cross recipient
- Sir Keith Aickin (OM 1933) - Justice of the High Court of Australia
- Sir Edmund Herring (OM 1910) – Chief Justice of the Victorian Supreme Court
- Alfred Brookes (OM 1936) – first Director-General of the Australian Secret Intelligence
- Manning Clark (OM 1933) - Australian historian and Australian of the Year (1980)
- Simon McKeon (OM 1973) – businessman, philanthropist, and Australian of the Year (2011)
- Barry Humphries (OM 1951) - Australian entertainer
- Frank Thring (OM 1941) - Hollywood actor
- Chester Wilmott (OM 1930) - War correspondent
- Sir Robert Blackwood (OM 1923) - First Chancellor of Monash University
- Sir Roy Grounds (OM 1923) - architect
- Ross Adler (OM 1962)- Business executive
- Kenneth Baillieu Myer AC (OM 1931) - Business executive and first Chairman of the ABC
- Edwin Flack (OM 1890) - athlete and Australia's first Olympian
- Don Cordner (OM 1939) - footballer and Brownlow medalist

== See also ==
- List of schools in Victoria
- List of high schools in Victoria
- Old Melburnians Football Club
