= Furnell =

Furnell is a surname. Notable people with this surname include:

- David Furnell (1874–?), English footballer
- Harry Furnell (1898–1973), Australian rules footballer
- Jim Furnell (born 1937), English footballer
- Raymond Furnell (1936–2006), Dean of York, England

== See also ==
- Farnell
