= Thomas Drew =

Thomas Drew may refer to:

- Thomas Drew (cricketer) (1875–1928), Australian cricketer
- Thomas Drew (MP), member of parliament in the 14th century for Bishop's Lynn
- Thomas Drue (c. 1586–1627), also spelt Drew, English playwright
- Thomas S. Drew (1802–1879), US politician
- Sir Thomas Drew (architect) (1838–1910), Irish architect
- Thomas Drew (diplomat) (born 1970), British diplomat
- Thomas E. Drew (born 1950), former Vermont adjutant general
