= John Monash =

Australian Army officer (1865–1931)

Sir John Monash GCMG KCB VD
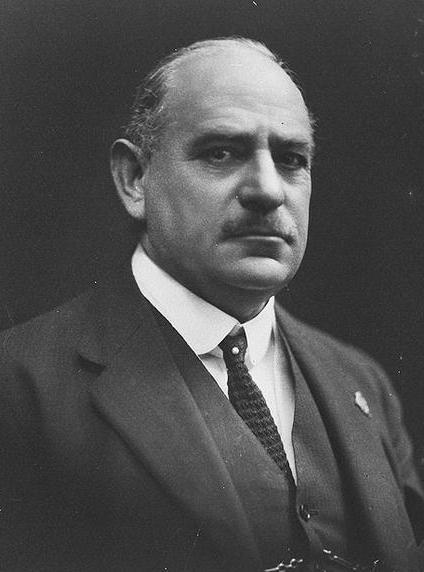
- Monash c. 1920s
- Born: 27 June 1865; Melbourne, Colony of Victoria
- Died: 8 October 1931 (aged 66); Melbourne, Victoria, Australia
- Burial place: Brighton General Cemetery, Victoria, Australia
- Alma mater: University of Melbourne (BEng, BA, LLB, DEng)
- Military career
- Allegiance: Australia
- Branch: Australian Army
- Service years: 1884–1920
- Rank: General
- Service number: 52
- Commands: Australian Corps (1918); 3rd Division (1916–1918); 4th Infantry Brigade (1914–1916); 13th Infantry Brigade (1913–1914)
- Conflicts: First World War; Gallipoli campaign; Western Front; Battle of Messines; Battle of Passchendaele; Battle of Broodseinde; First Battle of Passchendaele; Battle of Hamel; Battle of Amiens; Battle of St. Quentin Canal
- Awards: Knight Grand Cross of the Order of St Michael and St George; Knight Commander of the Order of the Bath; Volunteer Decoration; Mentioned in Despatches (6); Grand Officer of the Legion of Honour (France); Croix de Guerre (France); Grand Officer of the Order of the Crown (Belgium); Croix de Guerre (Belgium); Army Distinguished Service Medal (United States)
- Other work: Manager State Electricity Commission of Victoria (1920–1931); Vice-Chancellor University of Melbourne (1923–1931)

General Sir John Monash (/ˈmɒnæʃ/; 27 June 1865 – 8 October 1931) was an Australian military commander of the First World War and a civil engineer. He commanded the 13th Infantry Brigade before the war and then, shortly after its outbreak, became commander of the 4th Brigade in Egypt, with which he took part in the Gallipoli campaign.

In July 1916, he took charge of the newly raised 3rd Division in north-western France and, in May 1918, became commander of the Australian Corps, at that time the largest corps on the Western Front. According to historian A. J. P. Taylor, he was "the only general of creative originality produced by the First World War".

== Early life ==
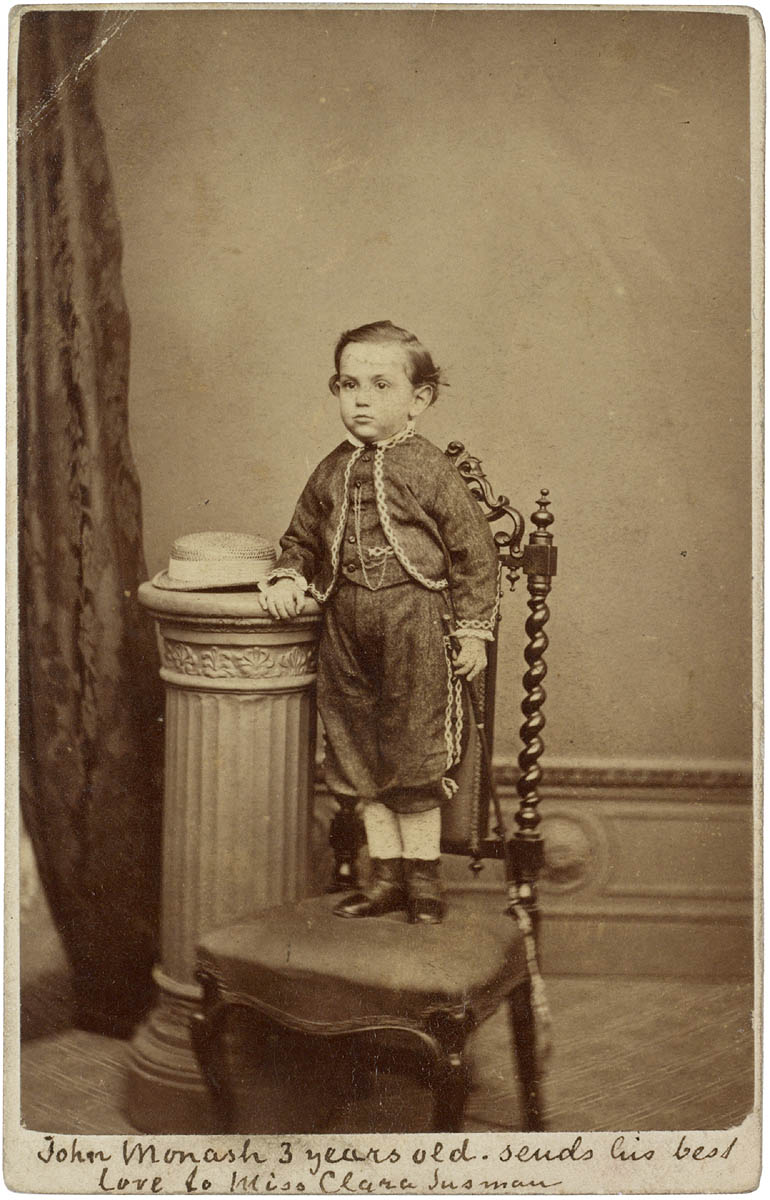
Monash aged 3, Melbourne, 1868

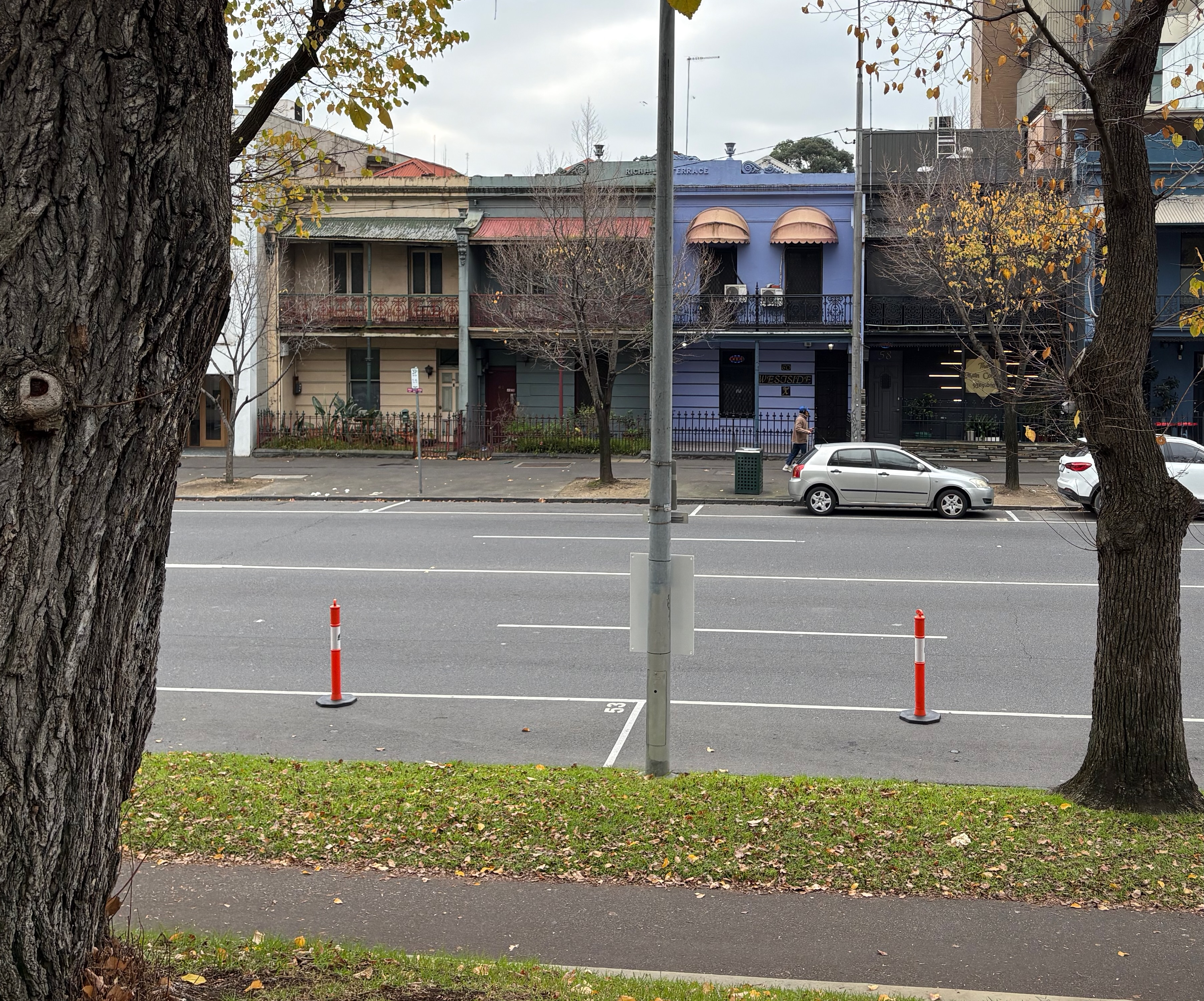
The terrace where John Monash was born. Number 58 Dudley Street is on the far right. (Looking north from the Flagstaff Gardens).

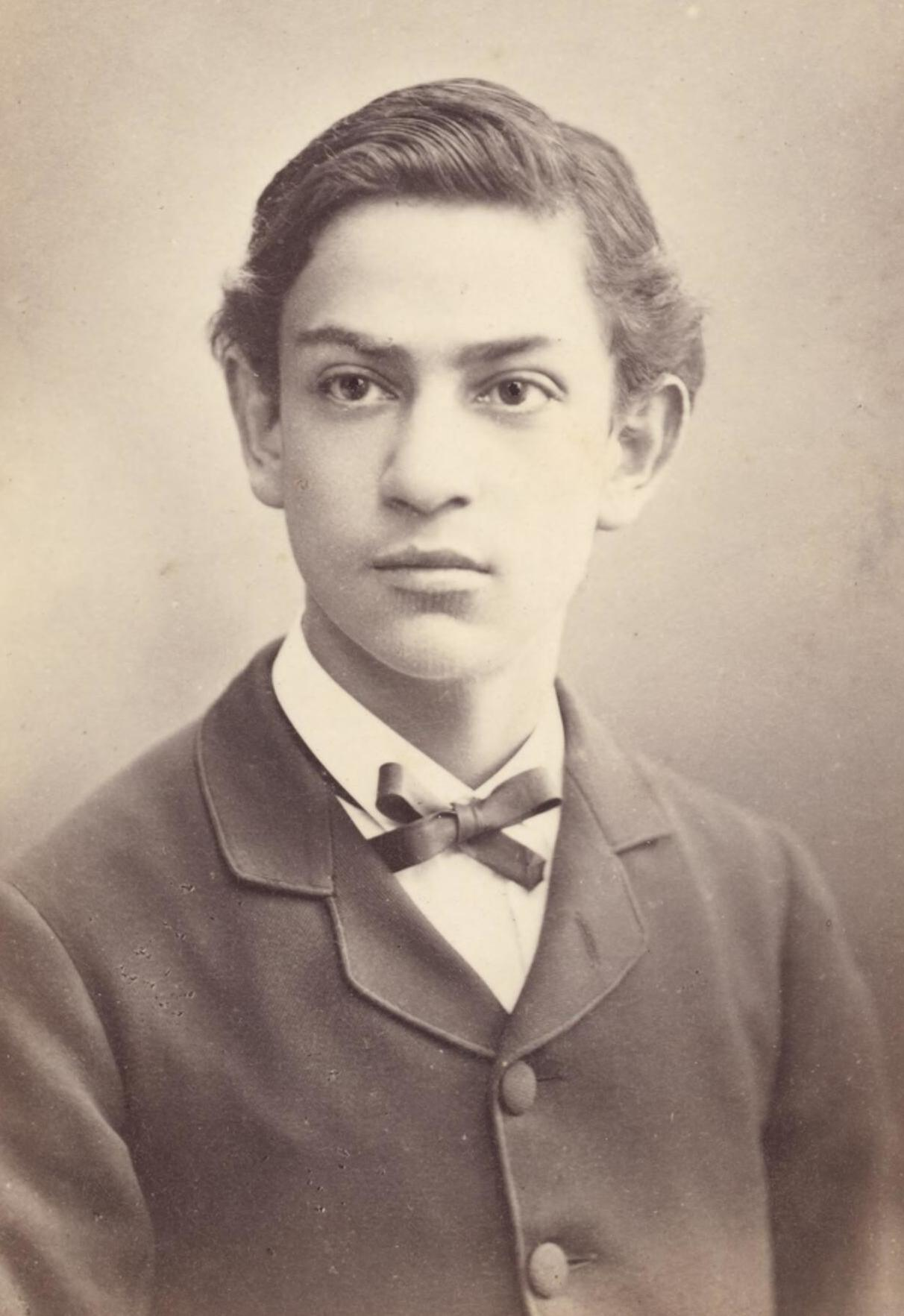
Monash as a teenager

Monash was born in 58 Dudley Street, West Melbourne, Victoria, to Jewish parents, both from Krotoschin in the Prussian province of Posen (now Krotoszyn, Poland). His birth certificate records his date of birth as 23 June 1865, but that is probably a mistake, because he was almost certainly born on 27 June. He was the first child of Louis Monash and his wife Bertha, née Manasse, who had arrived in Melbourne on the Empire of Peace on 5 June 1864. The family name was originally spelt Monasch and was pronounced with the emphasis on the second syllable.

The young family soon relocated from Dudley Street to larger premises on nearby Victoria Parade, before moving to a third rental property in Church Street, Richmond. In 1873, Bertha received a large inheritance from her mother, with which she purchased two houses, a large one in Yarra Street, Hawthorn, and a smaller one in Clifton Street, Richmond. The family resided in the smaller one and rented-out the larger one. The young John was sent to St Stephen's School on Docker's Hill in Richmond, and was remembered as a bright and alert schoolboy, with a special interest in English, some skill in drawing, a keen sense of fun, and no interest whatsoever in organised sport. At home his mother taught him piano, and encouraged him to read to her in English, French and German. The family spoke German as their native language. As might be expected from a man brought up by cultivated German parents who had arrived in Australia barely two years before John's birth, Monash spoke, read, and wrote German fluently. However, from 1914 until his death, he had good reason not to attract attention to his German background.

In 1874, the family moved to the small town of Jerilderie, in the Riverina region of New South Wales, where his father ran a store. Monash later claimed to have met the bushranger Ned Kelly during the Kelly gang's raid there in 1879. Monash attended the state school where his intelligence was recognised. The family was advised to move back to Melbourne to let John reach his full potential, which they did in 1877. Although his parents had largely abandoned religious practice, Monash celebrated his bar mitzvah at the East Melbourne Hebrew Congregation and sang in its choir. He was educated under Alexander Morrison at Scotch College, Melbourne, where he passed the matriculation examination when only 14 years of age. At age 16, he was dux of the school. He graduated from the University of Melbourne: a Master of Engineering in 1893; a Bachelor of Arts and Bachelor of Laws in 1895, and a Doctor of Engineering in 1921.

On 8 April 1891, Monash married Hannah Victoria Moss (1871–1920), and their only child, Bertha, was born in 1893. Monash had previously engaged in an affair with Annie Gabriel, the wife of one of his colleagues, which ended as an active matter after his conscious choice of 'Vic' for marriage (though communication continued many years afterwards). He worked as a civil engineer, and played a major role in introducing reinforced concrete to Australian engineering practice. He initially worked for private contractors on bridge and railway construction, and as their advocate in contract arbitrations. Following a period with the Melbourne Harbor Trust, in 1894 he entered into partnership with J. T. N. Anderson as consultants and contractors. When the partnership was dissolved in 1905 he joined with the builder David Mitchell and industrial chemist John Gibson to form the Reinforced Concrete & Monier Pipe Construction Co, and in 1906 with them and businessmen from South Australia, to form the S. A. Reinforced Concrete Co. He took a leading part in his profession and became president of the Victorian Institute of Engineers and a member of the Institution of Civil Engineers, London.

Monash joined the university company of the militia in 1884, and he became a lieutenant in the North Melbourne battery on 5 April 1887. He was promoted to captain in 1895 and in April 1897 was promoted to major and given command of the battery. On 7 March 1908, he was promoted to lieutenant-colonel in the intelligence corps. He was given command of the 13th Infantry Brigade in 1912, and was promoted colonel on 1 July 1913.

== First World War ==
=== Gallipoli ===
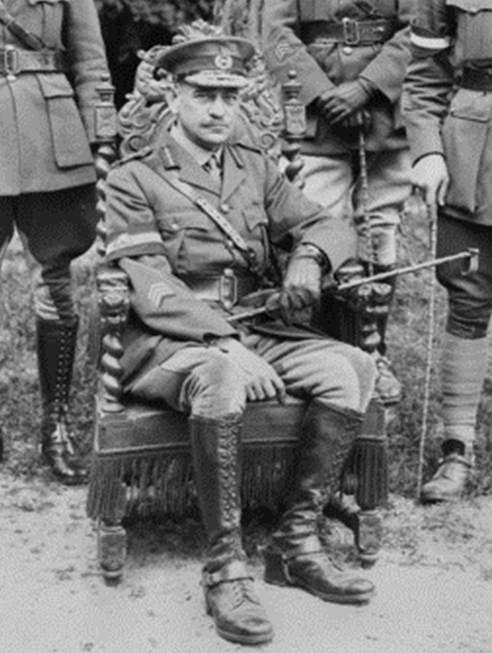
Monash during the First World War

When the First World War broke out in August 1914, Monash became a full-time army officer, accepting an appointment as the chief censor in Australia. Monash did not enjoy the job, and was keen for a field command. In September, after the Australian Imperial Force was formed, he was appointed as the commander of the 4th Infantry Brigade, which consisted of four battalions: the 13th, 14th, 15th and 16th. His appointment was met with some protest within the military, in part due to his German and Jewish ancestry, but Monash was supported by numerous high-ranking officers, including James Legge, James McCay and Ian Hamilton, and his appointment stood.

When the first contingent of Australian troops, the 1st Division, sailed in October, the 4th Brigade remained behind. Training was undertaken at Broadmeadows, Victoria, before embarking in December 1914. After arriving in Egypt in January 1915, Monash's brigade established itself at Heliopolis, where it was assigned to the New Zealand and Australian Division under Major General Alexander Godley. After a period of training, in April, the brigade took part in the Gallipoli campaign against the Turks. Assigned the role of divisional reserve, Monash came ashore early on 26 April. The brigade initially defended the line between Pope's Hill and Courtney's Post, and the valley behind this line became known as "Monash Valley". There he made a name for himself with his independent decision-making and his organisational ability. He was promoted to brigadier general in July, although the news was marred by spiteful rumours that were passed in Cairo, Melbourne and London about him being a "German spy". His promotion was gazetted in September, with effect from 15 September 1914.

During the August offensive, launched by the Allies to break the deadlock on the peninsula, Monash's brigade was to conduct a "left hook" to capture of Hill 971, the highest point on the Sari Bair range. On the evening of 6/7 August, the brigade launched its attack, but poor maps, heavy resistance and the mountainous terrain defeated them. Monash's performance was criticised for excessive delegation, and for failing to properly command his brigade, which broke and ran. Elsewhere, the offensive also stalled, resulting in disaster for the last co-ordinated effort to defeat the Turkish forces on the Gallipoli Peninsula. By mid-August, Monash's brigade was down to just 1,400 men out of the 3,350 at the beginning of the campaign. On 21 August, Monash led them in an attack on Hill 60, before it was withdrawn from the peninsula for rest. While the brigade recuperated on Lemnos, Monash took leave in Egypt, where he learned of his appointment as a Companion of the Order of the Bath. In November, the 4th Brigade returned to Gallipoli, occupying a "quiet sector" around Bauchop's Hill. Monash used his engineering knowledge to improve his brigade's position to withstand the winter, and he worked to improve the conditions that his troops would have to endure but, in mid-December, the order to evacuate the peninsula came.

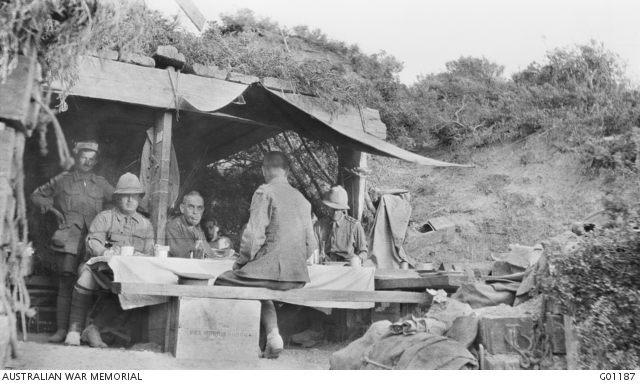
Colonel Monash's brigade headquarters at Anzac, Gallipoli, Turkey, 1915. Monash is third from the left, facing the camera.

Monash's time on Gallipoli and his departure from it were not, however, without controversy for reasons unrelated to the fighting. While on Gallipoli he "wrote very freely to his wife revealing much current information" and "opened himself to the criticism that he would not keep the rules by which his juniors had strictly to adhere." Later, in a long diary-letter sent home by Monash and known by him to be illegal in Army terms, Monash implied that he was "one of the very last off Gallipoli". However, "he had left for the beach nearly five hours before the last. It was a clumsy deception as so many people knew the facts."

Following the withdrawal from Gallipoli, Monash returned to Egypt, where the AIF underwent a period of reorganisation and expansion. That process resulted in the 4th Brigade being split, providing a cadre of experienced personnel to form the 12th Brigade. It was also reassigned to the 4th Division. After a period of training, Monash's brigade undertook defensive duties along the Suez Canal. On 25 April 1916, the first anniversary of the landing at Gallipoli, while at Tel-el-Kebir, Monash and his men solemnly observed Anzac Day. Monash distributed red ribbons to soldiers present at the first landing and blue ribbons to those who came later.

=== Western Front ===
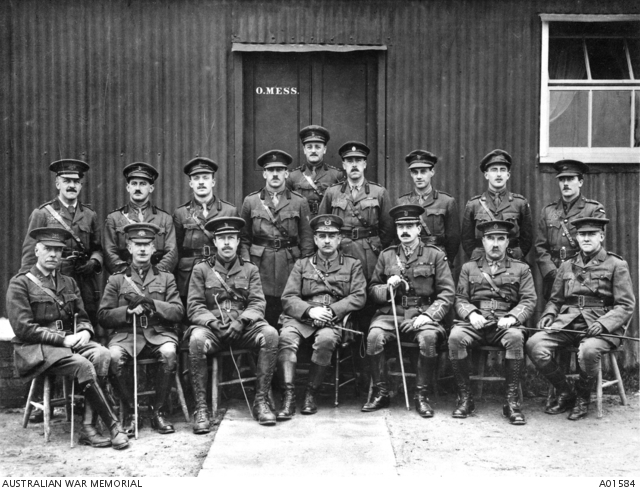
Monash, sat in the centre of the front row, GOC 3rd Australian Division, and members of his divisional staff before embarking for France, November 1916.

In June 1916, Monash and his command were transferred to the Western Front, being sent to the front around Armentières. On 10 July, Monash was promoted to temporary major general and placed in command of the Australian 3rd Division. He trained the division in England with attention to detail.

After the division was sent to the Western Front in November 1916, it fought at Messines, Broodseinde, and in the First Battle of Passchendaele, with some successes, but incurring heavy casualties. The British High Command was impressed by Monash and, according to biographer Geoffery Serle, while dining with Field Marshal Sir Douglas Haig, commanding the British Expeditionary Force, Monash was informed that Haig "wanted him as a corps commander".

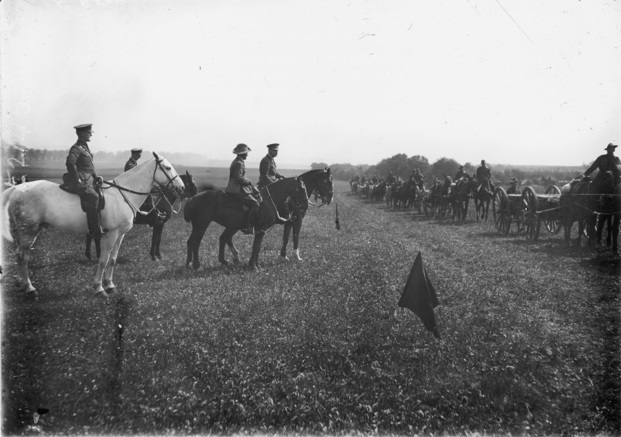
The 3rd Machine Gun Battalion marching past at the review by Major General John Monash, GOC 3rd Australian Division, France, May 1918.

Monash's division spent the winter of 1917–1918 around Ploegsteert. Early the following year, after the Germans launched their Spring Offensive, the 3rd Division was deployed to undertake defensive operations around Amiens. Throughout April and May, the division undertook several peaceful penetration operations. Monash later described the recapture of the town of Villers-Bretonneux on 25 April 1918, after the Germans had overrun the 8th British Division under General William Heneker, as the turning-point of the war. Sir Thomas William Glasgow's 13th Brigade, and Harold Elliott's 15th Brigade, were both heavily involved in the operation.

=== Commander of the Australian Corps ===
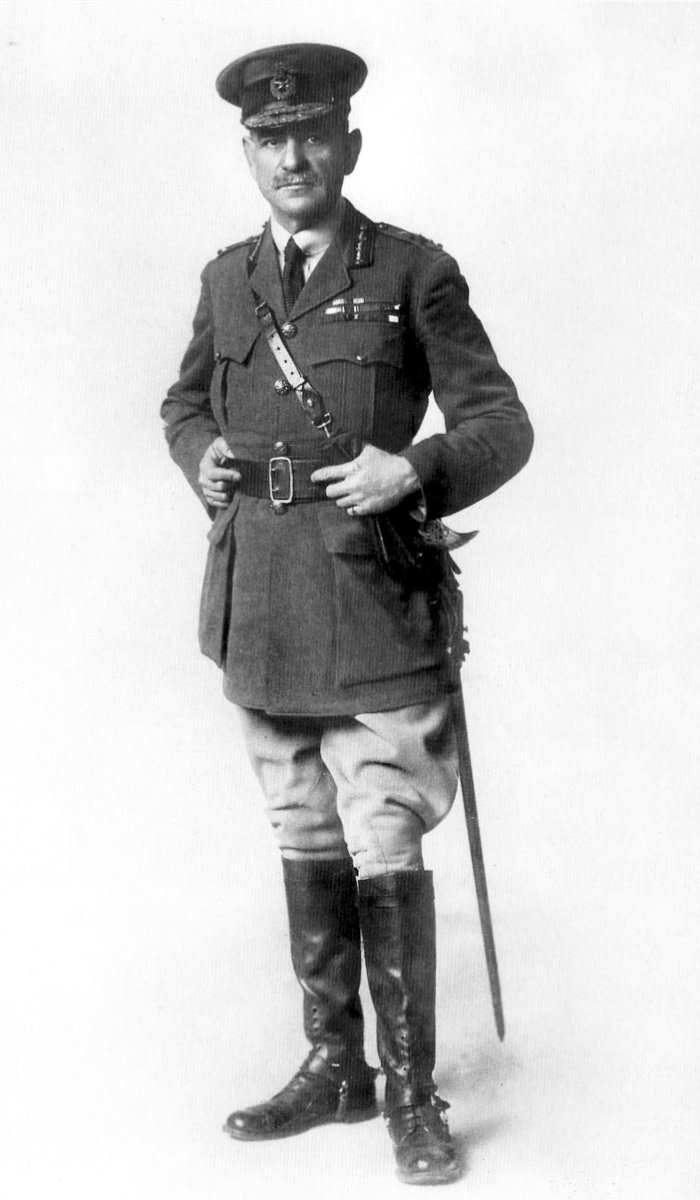
Monash in 1918

On 1 June 1918, the promotion of Monash to lieutenant general and commander of the Australian Corps, at the time the largest individual corps on the Western Front, was confirmed.

Monash's promotion was not without contention. Among those who considered and advocated for Major General Brudenell White to have command of the Australian Corps were Australia's Official War Correspondent and later Official Historian, Charles Bean, and journalist Keith Murdoch, although historian Justin Chadwick has written that Bean was one of many of that view.

Bean had reservations about Monash's "ideals", and was said to have a general prejudice against Monash's Prussian Jewish background. According to Kelly, Bean's core motivation at that time was that Brudenell White's appointment was in the best interest of the AIF, and that it would be a big mistake for White to leave the Australian Corps and go with Birdwood to the British Fifth Army. Historian Burness noted that Bean did recognise Monash's ability and was not concerned that he should be promoted, but he considered Brudenell White was better fitted to command the fighting corps. In that climate, Australian prime minister Billy Hughes arrived at the front, before the Battle of Hamel. He was prepared to replace Monash but, after consulting with senior officers and having seen the superb power of planning and execution displayed by Monash, changed his mind.

In his Official History, Charles Bean noted that Monash was more effective the higher he rose within the Army. His depth of knowledge not only of military matters, but also of engineering and business, ensured that his operational plans were the product of meticulous preparation and thorough and rigorous scrutiny.

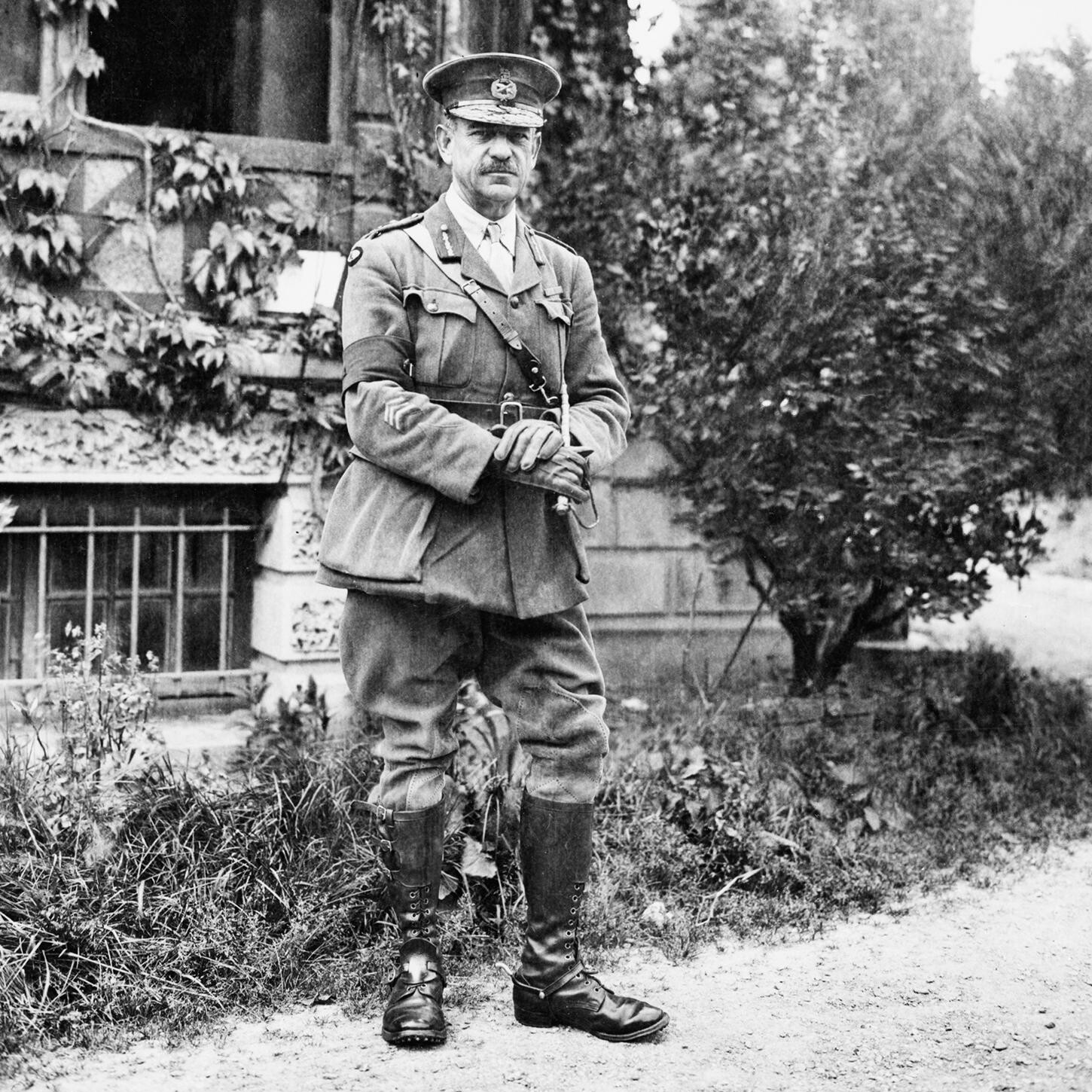
Monash, May 1918

Bean later wrote of his own "high intentioned but ill-judged intervention" and that "those who took action (relating to Monash's appointment) did so as I afterwards realised, without adequate appreciation of Monash, who, though his reputation as a front line soldier had been poor, was never the less a much greater man than most of us then thought."

At the Battle of Hamel on 4 July 1918, Monash, with the support of the British 4th Army commander Sir Henry Rawlinson, commanded the 4th Australian Division, supported by the British 5th Tank Brigade, along with a detachment of American troops, to win a small but operationally significant victory for the Allies.

On 8 August 1918, the Battle of Amiens was launched. Allied troops under the command of Haig, predominantly Rawlinson's British 4th Army (consisting of the Australian Corps under Monash, Canadian Corps under Sir Arthur Currie, British III Corps under Butler and British Cavalry Corps under Kavanagh), attacked the Germans. The Australian Corps spearheaded the allied attack. Monash gave them, as a key objective in the first phase, the capture of enemy artillery, in order to minimise the potential harm to the attacking forces. The battle was a strong, significant victory for the Allies, the first decisive win for the British Army of the war, causing the Germans to recognise that for them the War was lost. The defeated German leader, General Erich Ludendorff, described it in the following words: "August 8th was the black day of the German Army in the history of the war". Those operations were just a start of a broad Allied offensive across the Western Front. For the 1918 New years Day Royal honours list Monash was awarded a knighthood in the military division and later in the year on 12 August 1918, at Château de Bertangles, Monash was knighted by King George V as a Knight Commander of the Order of the Bath. The sword used during the knighthood was then presented to Monash as a keepsake.

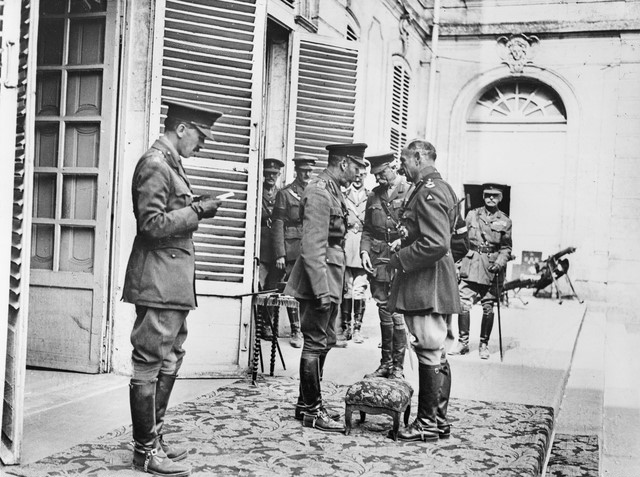
King George V congratulating Lieutenant General Sir John Monash, August 1918.

After that, the Australians achieved under Monash a series of victories against the Germans at Chuignes, Mont St Quentin, Peronne and Hargicourt. Of the battle of Mt St Quentin and the subsequent taking of the town of Peronne, Charles Bean wrote in the Official History: "the dash, intelligence, and persistence of the troops dealt a stunning blow to five German divisions, drove the enemy from one of its key positions in France, and took 2,600 prisoners at a cost of slightly over 3,000 casualties."

Monash had 208,000 men under his command, including 50,000 inexperienced Americans. He planned the attack on the German defences at the Battle of the Hindenburg Line between 16 September and 5 October 1918. The Allies had eventually breached the Hindenburg Line by 5 October, and the war was essentially over. On 5 October, Prinz Max von Baden, on behalf of the German Government, asked for an immediate armistice.

By the end of the war, Monash had acquired an outstanding reputation for intellect, personal magnetism, management and ingenuity. He also won the respect and loyalty of his troops. His motto was "Feed your troops on victory". Monash was regarded with great respect by the British. A British captain on the staff of William Heneker's 8th Division described Monash as "a great bullock of a man ... though his manners were pleasant and his behaviour far from rough, I have seen few men who gave me such a sensation of force ... a fit leader for the wild men he commanded". Field Marshal Bernard Montgomery later wrote: "I would name Sir John Monash as the best general on the western front in Europe".

For his services during the War, and in addition to his creation as a Knight Commander of the Order of the Bath, Monash was appointed as a Knight Grand Cross of the Order of St Michael and St George on 1 January 1919. He also received numerous foreign honours – the French appointed him a Grand Officer of the Légion d'honneur and awarded him the Croix de Guerre, the Belgians appointed him a Grand Officer of the Order of the Crown (Grand-Officier Ordre de la Couronne) and awarded him the Croix de Guerre, and the United States awarded him the Distinguished Service Medal. The Australian Government honoured Monash with promotion to the full rank of general explicitly "in recognition of his long and distinguished service with the Australian military forces" on 11 November 1929.

== After the war ==
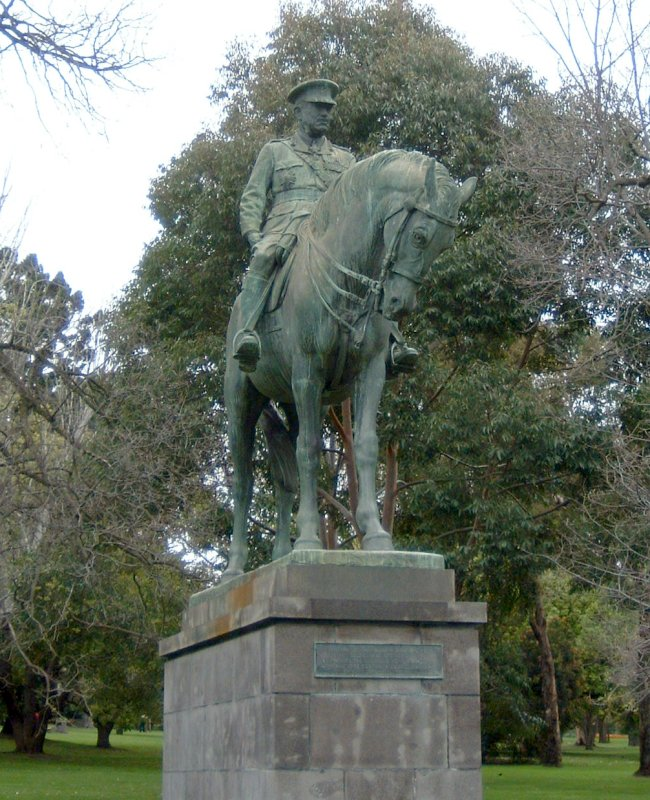
Statue of Sir John Monash in King's Domain, Melbourne.

In October 1918, towards the end of the war, Australian War Historian, Charles Bean, had urged Prime Minister William Hughes to have a plan of repatriation drawn up by the AIF and to put Monash in charge of it. Soon after the cessation of hostilities in November 1918, Hughes requested that Monash return to London to take up the appointment as Director-General of Repatriation and Demobilisation, heading a newly created department to carry out the repatriation of Australian troops from Europe.

In August 1919, while in London, Monash wrote The Australian Victories in France in 1918 which was published in 1920. According to Geoffrey Searle: "It was propaganda, but not far off the truth," and "(it) laid the groundwork for the popular narrative of 'Monash- the-war-winner.'" Monash was, nevertheless, a noted advocate of the co-ordinated use of infantry, aircraft, artillery and tanks. As he wrote in the book:

... the true role of infantry was not to expend itself upon heroic physical effort, not to wither away under merciless machine-gun fire, not to impale itself on hostile bayonets, nor to tear itself to pieces in hostile entanglements—(I am thinking of Pozières and Stormy Trench and Bullecourt, and other bloody fields)—but on the contrary, to advance under the maximum possible protection of the maximum possible array of mechanical resources, in the form of guns, machine-guns, tanks, mortars and aeroplanes; to advance with as little impediment as possible; to be relieved as far as possible of the obligation to fight their way forward; to march, resolutely, regardless of the din and tumult of battle, to the appointed goal; and there to hold and defend the territory gained; and to gather in the form of prisoners, guns and stores, the fruits of victory.

He returned to Australia on 26 December 1919 to an enthusiastic welcome. On 1 January 1920, he was promoted to the substantive rank of lieutenant-general and returned to the reserves.

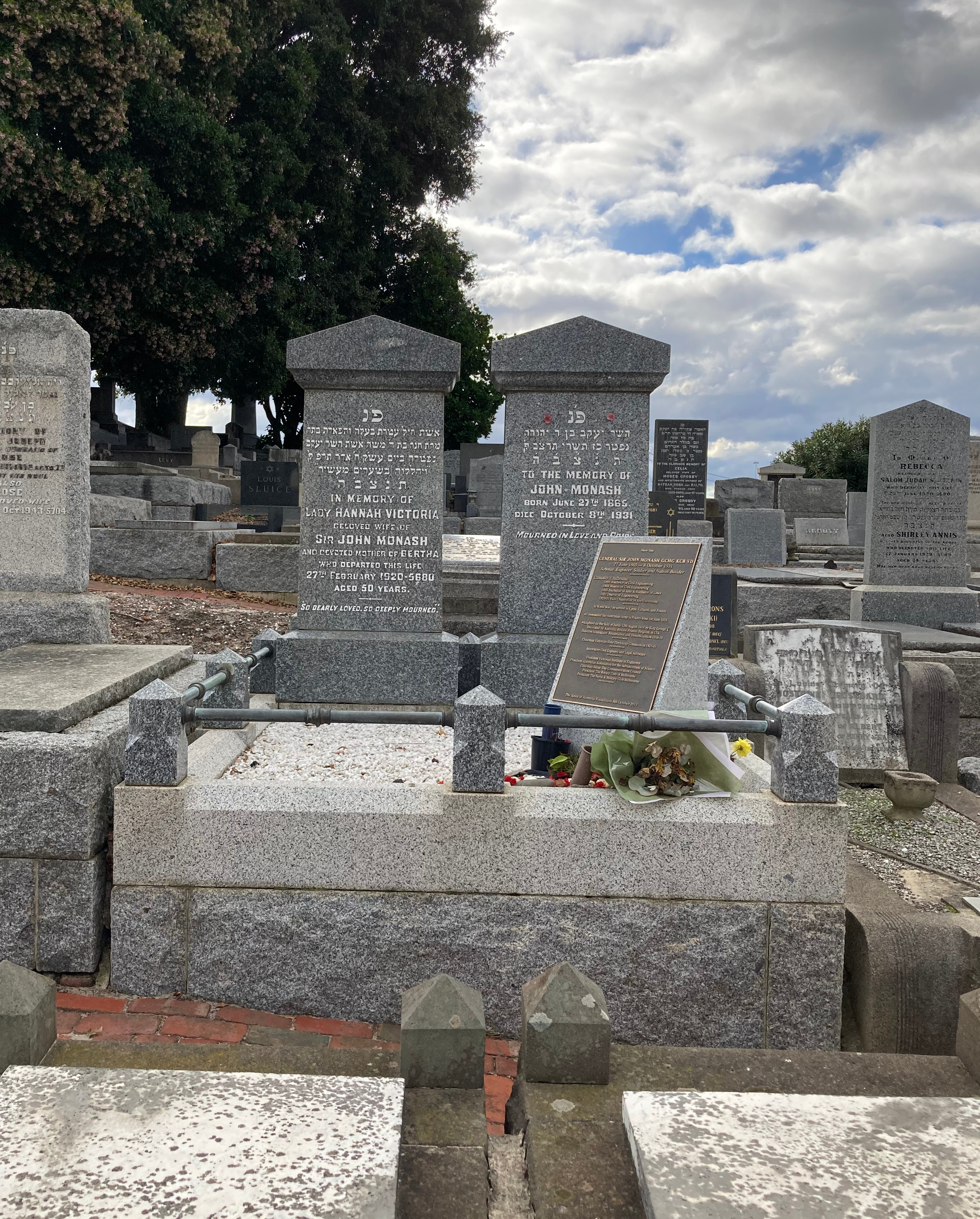
Graves of Hannah Victoria and John Monash at Brighton General Cemetery

Shortly after his return, on 27 February 1920, Monash's wife, Vic, died of cervical cancer. Monash had a prolonged affair with Elizabeth "Lizette" Bentwitch, a first cousin of the prominent Zionist Herbert Bentwich. The two planned to marry after Vic's death but Monash's daughter put her foot down to stop the union. Later, Monash worked in prominent civilian positions, the most notable being as head of the State Electricity Commission of Victoria (SECV) after October 1920. From 1923 until his death eight years later, he was vice-chancellor of the University of Melbourne . Monash was a founding member of the Rotary Club of Melbourne, Australia's first Rotary Club, and served as its second president (1922–1923). In 1927, he became president of the newly founded Zionist Federation of Australia and New Zealand.

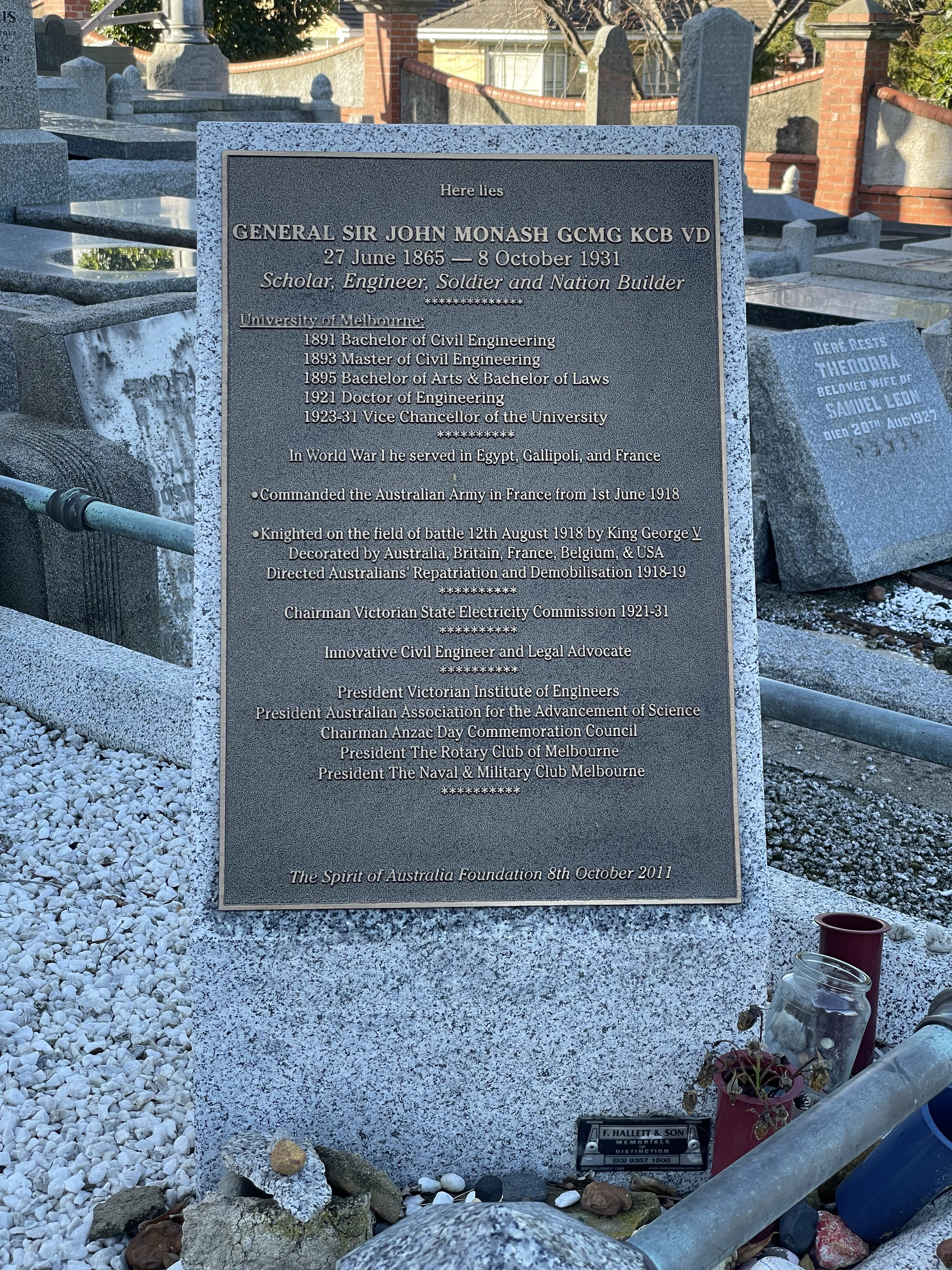
Commemoration on Sir John Monash's Grave

In 1923, he was called upon by the Victorian Government of Harry Lawson to organise "special constables" to restore order during the 1923 Victorian Police strike. He was one of the principal organisers of the annual observance of ANZAC Day and oversaw the planning for Melbourne's monumental war memorial, the Shrine of Remembrance. Monash was honoured with numerous awards and decorations from universities and foreign governments. According to his biographer Geoffrey Serle: "[i]n the 1920s Monash was broadly accepted, not just in Victoria, as the greatest living Australian".

Monash died in Melbourne on 8 October 1931 from a heart attack, and he was given a state funeral. An estimated 300,000 mourners came to pay their respects, the nation's largest funeral crowd to that time. After a Jewish service, and a 17-gun salute, he was buried in Brighton General Cemetery. In a final sign of humility, despite his achievements, honours and titles, he instructed that his tombstone simply bear the words "John Monash". He was survived by his daughter, Bertha (1893–1979).

== Legacy ==
=== Military impact ===
According to British historian A. J. P. Taylor, Monash was "the only general of creative originality produced by the First World War." Monash's impact on Australian military thinking was significant in three areas. First, he was the first Australian to fully command Australian forces and he took, as following Australian commanders did, a relatively independent line with his British superiors. Second, he promoted the concept of the commander's duty to ensure the safety and well-being of his troops to a pre-eminent position in a philosophy of "collective individualism". And finally, he, along with staff officer Thomas Blamey, forcefully demonstrated the benefit of thorough planning and integration of all arms of the forces available, and of all of the components supporting the front line forces, including logistical, medical and recreational services. Troops later recounted that one of the most extraordinary things about the Battle of Hamel was not the use of armoured tanks, nor the tremendous success of the operation, but the fact that in the midst of battle Monash had arranged delivery of hot meals up to the front line.

=== Cultural impact ===
In recognition of his enduring influence, Monash's face is on the $100 note, Australia's highest-value currency note. Monash's success in part reflected the tolerance of Australian society but, to a larger degree, his success – in the harshest experience the young nation had suffered – shaped that tolerance and demonstrated to Australians that the Australian character allowed for mutually tolerant creeds, and a blend of the traditions of the "bush" and the "city". According to author Colin MacInnes, as recounted by Monash's biographer, Geoffrey Serle, Monash's "presence and prestige ... made anti-Semitism ... impossible in Australia". He is also honoured in a Cantata for chorus, soloists and orchestra called Peace – A Cantata for John Monash, by composer/conductor David Kram. A proposed film about Monash's rise to command and his combined arm tactics during the first world war has been proposed under the title The General.

=== Eponyms ===
- Monash University, a public research university in Victoria
- City of Monash, a local government area in Melbourne
- Division of Monash, a Federal electoral division covering part of Gippsland, Victoria
- Monash Medical Centre, a teaching hospital in Melbourne (and location of his bust, which was originally located in the former SECV town of Yallourn)
- Monash Freeway, a major urban freeway in Melbourne
- John Monash Scholarships, annually awarded to outstanding Australians for postgraduate study overseas
- John Monash Science School, a specialist science secondary school in Clayton, Victoria
- Town of Monash in South Australia
- Kfar Monash ("Monash village") in Israel
- Suburb of Monash in Canberra
- Sir John Monash Stakes is a Group 3 horse race run each July at Caulfield Racecourse
- Monash Country Club in Ingleside on the Northern Beaches of Sydney
- Sir John Monash Drive in Caulfield East, Victoria
- 306 Monash Army Cadet Unit
- Sir John Monash Centre, commemorative interpretive centre at Villers-Bretonneux, France
- General Monash Branch – Royal Canadian Legion (Branch #115) Winnipeg, Manitoba, Canada

=== Movement for posthumous recognition ===
Since 2013, there has been a movement to posthumously promote Monash to the rank of field marshal. Monash would be the fourth person, and only second Australian-born person, to hold this rank. The movement was led by Tim Fischer, former Australian Deputy Prime Minister and author of the book, Maestro John Monash: Australia's Greatest Citizen General, and supported by other Australian Members of Parliament including Josh Frydenberg and Cathy McGowan. According to Fischer, Monash was denied promotion during his life due to discrimination, including as a result of his German-Jewish ancestry and his status as a reservist rather than professional soldier.

In October 2015, the Jerilderie Shire Council unanimously adopted the "Jerilderie Proposition", calling on the Australian Government to promote Monash:

Following on the outstanding contribution of Sir John Monash to state and nation before, during and after World War I and reflecting the fact that Sir John Monash received no Australian awards or honours post 11 November 1918, the Prime Minister approve by government gazette publication the posthumous promotion of one step in rank of General Sir John Monash to the rank of Australian field marshal, with effect 11 November 1930, one year after Sir John Monash was eventually promoted to the rank of general.

In fact, Monash was recognised after November 1918 by the Australian Government, and was promoted to the full rank of general by the Prime Minister James Scullin in recognition of his long and distinguished service with the Australian military forces on Armistice Day 11 November 1929. On 14 April 2018, Neil James, executive director of the Australian Defence Association, suggested that posthumously promoting Monash was unnecessary and "would demean his record." James also wrote that the campaign to do so highlighted the problem of "emotive mythology about our military history." He pointed out that Harry Chauvel was the first Australian to command a division and become a corps commander, being promoted to lieutenant general a year before Monash. James added: "I have yet to meet or even hear of [a military historian] who supports the Monash promotion proposal". Three days after James's comments the Australian Prime Minister, Malcolm Turnbull, announced that Monash would not be promoted posthumously to field marshal.

== Arms ==
Coat of arms of General Sir John Monash, GCMG, KCB, VD

Notes
Knighted in 1918 as a Knight Commander of the Order of St Michael and St George.
Adopted
Arms granted by the College of Arms on 3 December 1918. Supporters granted by the College of Arms on 26 May 1919.
Crest
A demi Lion Gules holding between the paws a pair of compasses Or.
Torse
Mantling Argent and Azure.
Helm
An open forward facing helmet.
Escutcheon
Azure a Fess between in chief five Mullets of eight points three and two and in base a Sword within two branches of Laurel all Or.
Supporters
Dexter: An Infantryman of the Australian Expeditionary Force supporting with his exterior hand a Rifle Sinister: An Artilleryman of the Australian Expeditionary Force all proper.
Motto
Marte et Arte
Orders
The Order of St Michael and St George circlet.
From left to right are Croix de guerre (France).
Neck badge of a Grand Officer of the Order of the Crown (Belgium).
Neck badge of a Knight Commander of the Order of the Bath.
Neck badge of a Knight Grand Cross of the Order of St Michael and St George.
Neck badge of a Grand Officer of the Legion of Honour (France).
The Distinguished Service Medal (United States).
The Croix de guerre (Belgium).
Symbolism
John Monash commanded the Australian Corps of the First Australian Imperial Force during the First World War.

== See also ==
- 1916 Pioneer Exhibition Game – charity match suggested by Monash

== Sources ==
- Dennis, Peter; Grey, Jeffrey; Morris, Ewan; Prior, Robin; Connor, John (1995), The Oxford Companion to Australian Military History, Melbourne, Victoria: Oxford University Press, ISBN 0-19-553227-9
- Ferguson, Ian (2012), Aussie War Heroes, Melbourne, Victoria: Brolga Publishing, ISBN 978-1-922175-21-2
- Gilbert, Martin (2008), Israel: A History, London: Black Swan, ISBN 978-0-552-77428-4
- Hart, Peter (2008), 1918: A Very British Victory, London: Phoenix Books, ISBN 978-0-7538-2689-8
- Hetherington, Mollie (1983), Famous Australians, Richmond, Victoria: Hutchinson, ISBN 978-0-09-148280-0
- Ludendorff, Erich (1971) [1920], Ludendorff's Own Story: August 1914 – November 1918; the Great War from the Siege of Liège to the Signing of the Armistice as Viewed from the Grand Headquarters of the German Army, Freeport, New York: Books for Libraries Press, ISBN 0-8369-5956-6
- Monash, John (1920), The Australian Victories in France in 1918, London: Hutchinson, OCLC 563884172
- Montgomery, Bernard Law (1972), A Concise History of Warfare, London: Collins, ISBN 0-00-192149-5
- Palazzo, Albert (2002), Defenders of Australia: The 3rd Australian Division 1916–1991, Loftus, New South Wales: Australian Military Historical Publications, ISBN 1-876439-03-3
- Perry, Roland (2004), Monash: The Outsider Who Won A War, Milsons Point, New South Wales: Random House, ISBN 1-74051-364-9
- Perry, Roland (2007) [2004], Monash: The Outsider Who Won A War, North Sydney, New South Wales: Random House, ISBN 978-1-74166-847-6
- Pedersen, P. A. (1985), Monash as Military Commander, Carlton, Victoria: Melbourne University Press, ISBN 0-522-84267-4
- Serle, Geoffrey (1982), John Monash: A Biography, Carlton, Victoria: Melbourne University Press, ISBN 0-522-84239-9
- Warhaft, Sally (2004), Well May We Say... : The Speeches That Made Australia, Melbourne: Black, ISBN 1-86395-277-2

Military offices
New command	Director General of Repatriation; 1918–1919	Succeeded by Brigadier General Carl Jess
Preceded by General Sir William Birdwood	General Officer Commanding Australian Corps; 1918	Succeeded by Lieutenant General Sir Talbot Hobbs
New command	General Officer Commanding 3rd Division; 1916–1918	Succeeded by Major General Sir John Gellibrand
Academic offices
Preceded by	Vice-Chancellor of the University of Melbourne; 1923–1931	Succeeded by Sir James Barrett
