= Choir of Trinity College, University of Melbourne =

University college chapel choir

- Choir
- Former name: Trinity College Glee Club
- Origin: Trinity College, University of Melbourne, Melbourne, Victoria, Australia
- Founded: 1934
- Founder: T. M. Robinson
- Genre: Sacred music, Choral music
- Members: ~27 choral scholars
- Music director: Chris Watson
- Concert hall: Trinity College Chapel
- Affiliation: University of Melbourne, Anglican tradition
- Website: www.trinity.unimelb.edu.au/about/chapel/choir

The Choir of Trinity College, at Trinity College within the University of Melbourne, is a collegiate chapel choir modelled on the choirs at Cambridge and Oxford universities. The choir consists of 27 choral scholars (either residents or non-residents of the college). Under the supervision of the director of music, the choir and organ scholars provide music for regular services of Anglican worship in the college chapel as well as a schedule of public concert performances and recordings for ABC Classics.

== History ==
In 1934, the chaplain of the college, T. M. Robinson, with advice from the then organist of St Paul's Cathedral, Melbourne, A. E. Floyd, reorganised the college's existing Glee Club as a chapel choir. Among the choir's early conductors was the historian A. G. L. Shaw, later to be dean of the college.

Students and staff continued to provide music for services in the chapel — with the number and quality varying along with the interest or skill of those directing them — until the 1970s when the college determined that a professional director of music was to be appointed to give continuity and coherence to the musical program and also to maintain high standards through a system of auditions and scholarships. The first holder of this position was Peter Dennison, Professor of Music at Melbourne University, who began a new and continuing choir in 1976 and inaugurated the annual Festival of Lessons and Carols.

The choir have recorded for and given live broadcasts on BBC Radio 4, US Public Radio, ABC-FM and 3MBS-FM. They were invited to present a concert of Bach cantatas during the "Bach 2000" Melbourne International Arts Festival and also participated in the Melbourne Federation Festival in 2001. The choir have performed concerts for the Melbourne International Festival of Choirs and the Melbourne Autumn Music Festival as well as festivals in regional Australia (including the Port Fairy and Apollo Bay festivals) and overseas (including those in Ludlow, Lichfield and Cheltenham). At the Llangollen International Eisteddfod in 2001 the choir were placed fourth in the chamber choir division. They have also undertaken invited residencies at Christ Church Cathedral, Oxford, and presented Daily Service on BBC Radio 4 on three separate occasions. In 2009, the choir were invited to participate in the Melbourne season of concerts by the Australian Brandenburg Orchestra at the Melbourne Recital Centre.

During university term, the choir sings full Choral Evensong in the college chapel at 5:45 pm each Thursday evening and 5.00 pm each Sunday evening. The choir's service for All Saint's Day was broadcast nationally on ABC Television on 26 October 2008 in the series Hymns of Glory.

== Discography ==
- O Clap Your Hands (Cherubic, 1998) after Psalm 47
- Rejoice: Sacred Choral Music through the Ages (ABC Classics 472 310-2, 2002)
- My Spirit Sang All Day (Cherubic, 2004)
- O Blessed Light: In Praise of the Holy Trinity (ABC Classics 476 294-2, 2004)
- The Children's Hospitals Hush Collection: Volume 5 (HUSH 005, 2005)
- Abide with Me: A Treasury of Classic Hymns (ABC Classics 476 5682, 2006)
- Southern Star: Music of Christopher Willcock and Benjamin Britten (ABC Classics 476 6349, 2007)
- Mystical Songs: Choral Music of Vaughan Williams (ABC Classics 476 6906, 2008)
- Choral Spectacular: The Greatest Choral Music of All Time - eight tracks by Trinity (ABC Classics, 3 CDs, 476 5706, 2009)
- Angel Songs (ABC Classics 476 3769, 2010)
