= Harold Stewart (footballer) =

Australian rules footballer

Personal information
- Full name: Harold John Stewart
- Born: 26 April 1876; Prahran, Victoria
- Died: 10 December 1956 (aged 80); Toorak, Victoria
- Original team: Wesley College

Playing career^{1}
Years	Club	Games (Goals)
1900	St Kilda	1 (0)
- ^{1} Playing statistics correct to the end of 1900.

Harold John Stewart (26 April 1876 – 10 December 1956) was an Australian rules footballer who played with St Kilda in the Victorian Football League (VFL). Educated at Wesley College, Melbourne, Stewart would return to the school as Headmaster in 1933. In 1895, he entered the University of Melbourne where he was a member of Trinity College during his Arts degree.
