= Angus Trumble =

Australian art historian and curator (1964–2022)

Angus Alexander Geoffrey Trumble (6 October 1964 – 8 October 2022) was an Australian scholar, art curator, and author. He was the director of the National Portrait Gallery of Australia, a senior research fellow at the National Museum of Australia, a curator at the Yale Center for British Art at Yale University, and at the Art Gallery of South Australia. His books include A Brief History of the Smile and The Finger: A Handbook.

== Early life ==
Trumble was born in Melbourne on 6 October 1964. He was the youngest of four sons of Peter Campbell Trumble, a lawyer, and Helen Trumble. He entered residence at Trinity College, Melbourne, in 1983 while studying fine arts and history at the University of Melbourne, graduating in 1986. He subsequently interned at the Peggy Guggenheim Collection in Venice, before studying for a master's degree at the Bibliotheca Hertziana in Rome and the University of Melbourne.

== Career ==
Trumble worked from 1987 to 1991 as aide to the governor of Victoria, Davis McCaughey. He was awarded a Fulbright scholarship in 1994 to undertake further study at the New York University Institute of Fine Arts. Two years later, he was appointed associate curator (and later curator in 1998) of European art at the Art Gallery of South Australia. He curated and wrote the catalogues for exhibitions including Bohemian London and Love & Death: Art in the Age of Queen Victoria.

Trumble was appointed curator (later senior curator) of paintings and sculpture at the Yale Center for British Art in May 2003, where he served until 2014, when he was appointed director of the National Portrait Gallery of Australia. He was director of the National Portrait Gallery until December 2018. During this period he acquired significant portraits including those of William Bligh by John Webber and Helena Rubinstein by Graham Sutherland. Between 2019 and 2022 he was a senior research fellow at the National Museum of Australia. In 2015 he was named a fellow of the Australian Academy of the Humanities, and in September 2022 was installed as an honorary fellow of his alma mater, Trinity College, Melbourne.

In addition to art, Trumble was the author of A Brief History of the Smile (2003) and The Finger: A Handbook (2010), and co-author (with Andrea Wolk Rager) of Edwardian Opulence: British Art at the Dawn of the Twentieth Century. At the time of his death he was working on a biography of Helena Rubinstein. He was a regular contributor to The Times Literary Supplement, The Burlington Magazine, The Paris Review, Esopus Magazine, and Australian Book Review.

== Personal life ==
Trumble died on 8 October 2022, two days after his 58th birthday.

== Published works ==
- A Brief History of the Smile (2003) ISBN 9781741140729
- The Finger: A Handbook (2010) ISBN 9780522857696
- Edwardian Opulence: British Art at the Dawn of the Twentieth Century (2013) ISBN 9780300190250, co-written with Andrea Wolk Rager.
- Helena Rubinstein: The Australian Years. La Trobe University Press. 2023. ISBN 9781760644529; with a foreword by Sarah Krasnostein
