= Bill Denehy =

Australian rules footballer

Personal information
- Full name: William John Denehy
- Born: 29 May 1889; Brunswick, Victoria
- Died: 24 November 1960 (aged 71); Melbourne
- Original team: Melbourne Grammar

Playing career^{1}
Years	Club	Games (Goals)
1911–12	University	21 (0)
- ^{1} Playing statistics correct to the end of 1912.

William John Denehy (29 May 1889 – 24 November 1960) was an Australian rules footballer who played with University in the Victorian Football League (VFL).

Denehy entered Melbourne University in 1907, where he was a resident student at Trinity College studying medicine. In 1917, he returned to Melbourne University as Stewart Scholar and Demonstrator in Medicine.
