= Christopher Roper (legal educator) =

Australian lawyer and educator (born 1944)

Christopher John Roper AM (born 25 December 1944) is an Australian lawyer and educator. He is the director of the St James' Institute. He is a former adjunct professor of the City University of Hong Kong, a former director of the College of Law Sydney and a former professor of the College of Law England and Wales.

== Education ==
Roper attended Newington College (1955–1961) and is an arts and law graduate of the University of Sydney Law School. He has an honours master's degree in education. Later Roper studied theology at Trinity College (University of Melbourne).

== Legal career ==
After working as a lawyer, Roper began a career in professional legal education. He was the executive director of the Leo Cussen Institute in Melbourne and later the director of the College of Law in Sydney. After working as the director of education of King & Wood Mallesons he became the first director of The Centre for Legal Education. Roper then returned to the College of Law and developed an alliance between the Colleges of Law in England, Australia and New Zealand.

== Honours ==
In the Australia Day Honours List of 1999, Roper was made a member of the Order of Australia in the General Division "for service to the development of continuing legal education".
