= William Hancock (priest) =

Australian priest (1863–1955)

William Hancock (14 April 1863 – 29 October 1955) was an Australian priest. An Anglican, he was Archdeacon of Melbourne from 1928 to 1935.

== Biography ==
Hancock was born on 14 April 1863, in Geelong West. His parents were English-born brick manufacturer Daniel Hancock, and Irish-born Margaret (née Higgins) Hancock. In October 1878, his mother died. In November 1878, he was hired as a clerk to Melbourne's Audit Office. In 1882, he pursued religious studied by request of bishop James Moorhouse. He attended Trinity College, Melbourne, graduating in 1887.

Hancock was deaconed following his graduating, then in 1888, was ordained a priest. His first services as a clergyman were as an assistant chaplain of hospitals in Melbourne. In his career, he led St Paul's Cathedral, Bendigo, as well as churches in Bairnsdale, Brighton, Euroa, Fitzroy, Moonee Ponds, Nathalia, Sandhurst, and St Kilda. He helped establish the Anglican Diocese of Gippsland, by funding $10,000. He was also the Archdeacon of Dandenong, Geelong, and Melbourne (1928–1935). Theologically, he was a liberal Anglo-Catholic. He retired c. 1928, at age 65. Archbishop Joseph Booth wrote, of his career, that "probably no man ever rendered greater service to the Church in Victoria".

Hancock got engaged to Elizabeth Katharine McCrae in 1886, marrying on 5 June 1890, at St Paul's Anglican Church, Camperdown. They had four children together, including Keith Hancock, who went on to become a historian. He died on 29 October 1955, aged 92, in Brighton, and is buried in the Box Hill Cemetery.
