= Trinity College, Melbourne =

College of the University of Melbourne, Victoria, Australia

Trinity College
- University of Melbourne
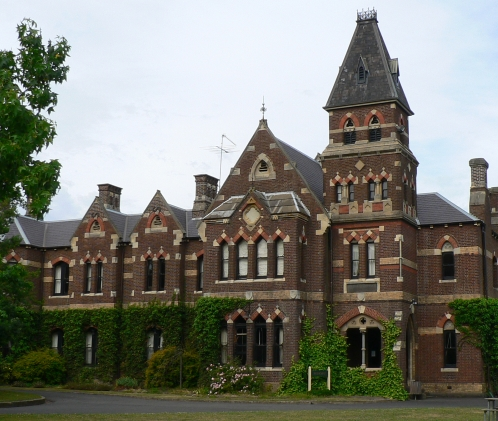

- Arms of Trinity College
- Location: Royal Parade, Parkville, Victoria
- Coordinates: 37.7948°S 144.9589°E
- Full name: Trinity College of and within the University of Melbourne
- Motto: Pro Ecclesia, Pro Patria (Latin)
- Motto in English: For church, for country
- Established: 1870, opened in 1872
- Named for: The Holy Trinity
- Warden: Kenneth Hinchcliff
- Undergraduates: 372
- Website: trinity.unimelb.edu.au

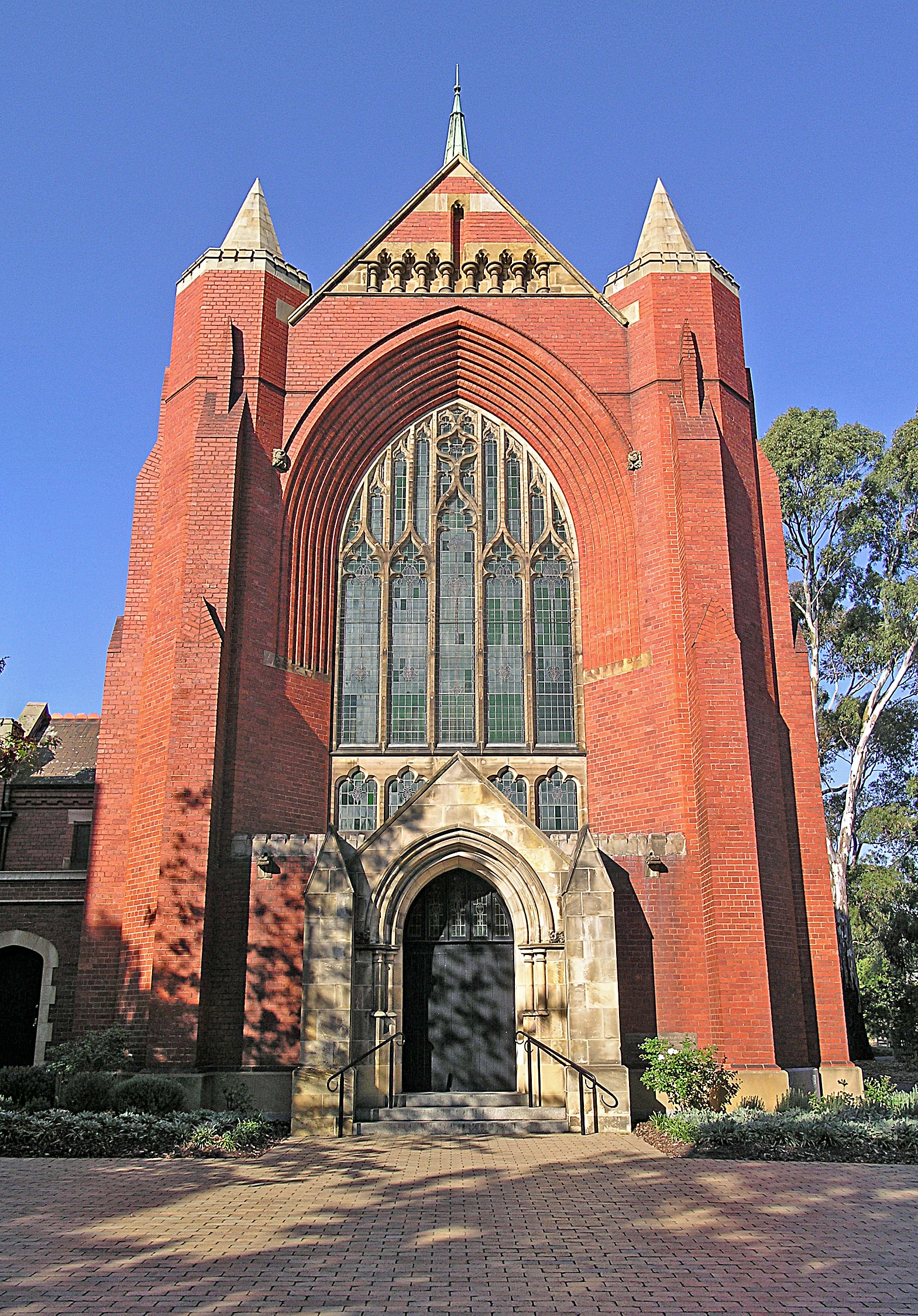
Horsfall Chapel from Royal Parade

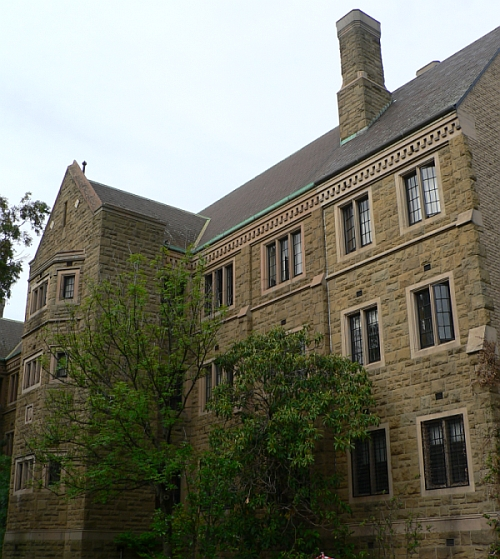
Behan

Trinity College is the oldest residential college of the University of Melbourne, the first university in the colony of Victoria, Australia. The college was opened in 1872 on a site granted to the Church of England by the government of Victoria. In addition to its resident community of 380 students, mostly attending the University of Melbourne, Trinity's programs includes the Trinity College Theological School, an Anglican training college which is a constituent college of the University of Divinity; and the Pathways School which runs Trinity College Foundation Studies and prepares international students for admission to the University of Melbourne and other Australian tertiary institutions, as well as summer and winter schools for young leaders and other short courses.

== History ==
Trinity College was founded in 1870 by the first Anglican Bishop of Melbourne, Charles Perry. Students were in residence from 1872, the first being John Francis Stretch. The college was affiliated with the University of Melbourne in 1876. The Trinity College Theological School was founded by Bishop James Moorhouse in 1877, and the first theological student was Arthur Green.

In 1883 the college became the first university college in Australia to admit women when Lilian Helen Alexander was accepted as a non-resident student. With the establishment of the Trinity Women's Hostel (which later became Janet Clarke Hall) in 1886, Trinity admitted women as resident students, making it the first university college in Australia to do so. Among the earliest resident women was Classicist Melian Stawell.

In 1989 the Trinity College Foundation Studies program was established to prepare international students for entry to the University of Melbourne.

Since 2001, Trinity has also offered summer school programs to high school age students from around Australia and internationally. In 2010 the college hosted its first Juilliard Winter Jazz School.

== Architecture and main buildings ==
Situated to the north of the main University of Melbourne campus, as part of College Crescent, Trinity's buildings surround a large grassed area, known as the Bulpadock. Its built environment is a mix of stone, stone-faced and brick, in a variety of styles from the different periods of its history.

The college's main buildings include:

- 1870-2: Leeper Building (formerly the Lodge)
- 1878: Bishops' Building (named after Charles Perry and James Moorhouse, the first and second bishops of Melbourne)
- 1880: Dining hall
- 1883–87: Clarke's Building (designed by Edmund Blacket and listed on the Victorian Heritage Register)
- 1914–17: Horsfall Chapel
- 1933: Behan Building (named after John Clifford Valentine Behan, a former warden)
- 1958: Memorial Building (commonly called "Jeopardy")
- 1963–65: Cowan Building (named after Ronald Cowan, a former warden)
- 1995–96: Evan Burge Building (college library)
- 2006–07: Gourlay Building ("Woodheap")
- 2014–16: Gateway Building
- 2019–20: Dorothy Jane Ryall Building ("Dorothy")

== College life ==
=== Clubs and societies ===
The Trinity College Associated Clubs (TCAC) provides leadership for the annual orientation week program at the beginning of the academic year and facilitates a multitude of social, cultural and sporting events throughout the year. Trinity's clubs and societies run many different functions and events throughout the year. The current student clubs include an art room and the E. R. White art collection, Beer Budlay, Billiards Room, Dialectic Society (formed in 1877), a drama club, Environmental Committee, Games Society, Gender and Sexuality Alliance, Independent Dining Society, Racquet's Society, several music clubs and a wine cellar. Students also run an active program of social service and community outreach, including such programs as tutoring in local schools and educational visits to remote Indigenous communities.

=== Sport ===
Trinity College participates in many different sports in intercollegiate competition, including Australian rules football, soccer, netball, hockey, athletics, swimming, volleyball, squash, tennis and badminton. The college also has a particularly strong tradition in rowing and rugby. The college has its own multi-purpose synthetic court.

=== College song ===
The current college song was written by the fifth warden, Evan Burge (1974–1996), set to the hymn tune "Thaxted" derived from the "Jupiter" movement from Gustav Holst's The Planets.

Where Bishops' lifts its ivy'd tower and Clarke's long cloisters run.
The College Oak stands spreading forth its branches to the sun.
And here are joy and laughter and loyal friends as well;
The Bulpadock rejoices in our efforts to excel.
And whene'er we think on all these things wherever we may be,
We shall raise our voices higher and sing of Trinity.

Great God, your spirit fills this earth, your truth can make us free,
O lift us up beyond ourselves to be all we can be.
For you have made and love us, and guide us through all strife,
You gave your Son as one of us, his death's our source of life.
In friendship bind out hearts in one, a diverse unity,
And make us worthy of your name, O glorious Trinity.

== Chapel and choir ==
The Choir of Trinity College has become known, especially but not exclusively, for choral music in the tradition of English cathedrals and the collegiate chapels of Oxford and Cambridge universities. The choir sings Evensong in the chapel during term. Choral Evensong at Trinity has become a well-known liturgical event in Melbourne. The choir also performs locally and tours internationally and have made a number of radio broadcasts and CD recordings, including five albums for ABC Classics.

From 1956 to 2016, the college provided liturgical hospitality to a dispersed Anglican congregation, the Canterbury Fellowship. The fellowship's choir sang for choral services on Sunday mornings and Evensong out of term time.

The current chaplain of the College is the Reverend Dr Luke Hopkins.

== Wardens ==
- 1872–1875: George William Torrance (acting principal)
- 1876–1918: Alexander Leeper
- 1918–1946: John Clifford Valentine Behan
- 1946–1964: Ronald William Trafford Cowan
- 1964–1965: John Poynter; Barry Marshall (joint-acting wardens)
- 1965–1973: Robin Lorimer Sharwood
- 1974–1997: Evan Laurie Burge
- 1997–2006: Donald John Markwell
- 2007–2014: Andrew Brian McGowan
- 2014–2015: Campbell P. Bairstow (acting warden)
- 2015–2026: Kenneth William Hinchcliff
- 2026–present: Russell Goulbourne

== Subwardens, deputy wardens and deans ==
Subwardens (vice wardens)

- 1876–1882: John Winthrop Hackett
- 1898–1904: Reginald Stephen
- 1905–1912: Ernest Iliff Robson
- 1915–1917: Charles Roy Lister
- 1919–1925: Robert Leslie Blackwood
- 1926–1933: David Gordon Taylor

Residential deans

- 1933–1946 Lewis Charles Wilcher
- 1941–1944 Herbert Charles Corben (acting dean)
- 1944–1946 Alan George Lewers Shaw, J. N. Falkingham (acting deans)
- 1947–1951 Alan George Lewers Shaw
- 1950–1951 Peter Balmford (acting dean)
- 1951–1952 Peter Ernest Wynter (acting dean)
- 1950–1951 Peter Balmford (acting dean)
- 1953–1964 John Riddoch Poynter
- 1959 Peter Balmford (acting dean)
- 1965 David W. Bruce
- 1966–1968 Kenneth Bruce Mason
- 1968 James Donald Merralls
- 1969–1971 Raymond William Gregory
- 1972–1974 Roderick A. Fawns
- 1975–1977 John Michael Davis
- 1978–1984 Bryan Deschamp
- 1984–1987 Peter N. Wellock
- 1988–1990 Leith K. Hancock
- 1991 James S. Craig, Michael R. Jones (acting deans)
- 1992–1994 Mary Chapman
- 1995–1996 Jan Jelte 'Wal' Wiersma
- 1997 Damian Xavier Powell (acting)
- 1998 John Adams (Dean of Students)

Residential deans and deputy wardens

- 2000–2004: Stewart D. Gill
- 2006–2008: Peter J. Tregear
- 2008–2013: Campbell P. Bairstow
- 2014–2015: Sally A. Dalton-Brown (acting, then dean)
- 2016–2018: Campbell P. Bairstow

Dean of the residential college

- 2019–present: Leonie Jongenelis

Deputy warden

- 2019–present: Scott Charles (also director of advancement)

Theological deans

Leadership of theological education at Trinity was originally the responsibility of the college chaplains under the supervision of the warden. Since the 1970s there have been lecturers specifically appointed to teach in and lead the school, holding the positions of Stewart Lecturer, director and, more recently, dean.

- 1971–1975: Max Thomas, Stewart Lecturer
- 1976–1985: John Gaden Thomas, director and Stewart Lecturer
- 1986–1997: Richard McKinney, director and Maynard Lecturer
- 1998: Scott Cowdell, Maynard Lecturer and acting director
- 1999–2003: David Cole, director and Woods Lecturer
- 2003–2007: Andrew McGowan, director and Munro Lecturer
- 2007–2010: Timothy Gaden, dean and Stewart Lecturer
- 2011–2017: Dorothy Lee, dean and Frank Woods Professor
- 2018: Mark Lindsay, Joan F. W. Munro Professor and acting dean
- 2019–present: Robert Derrenbacker, dean and Frank Woods Associate Professor

Pathways School deans

- 1990: Karel Reus (executive director, Trinity Education Centre)
- 1991–1998: Dennis White (executive director, Trinity Education Centre)
- 1999–2001: David Prest (director, Trinity Foundation Studies Program)
- 2002: Alan Patterson (director, Trinity Foundation Studies Program)
- 2003–2006: Diana Smith (director, Trinity Foundation Studies Program)
- 2006–2014: Barbara Cargill (dean, International Programs)
- 2014–2019: Denise Bush
- 2019–present: Richard Pickersgill

== Notable alumni ==
Recognised alumni with existing profiles on Wikipedia, the Australian Dictionary of Biography or other verified biographies are arranged below by the category in which they are generally associated. Many alumni served during the world wars; however, unless they pursued a military career or were killed in action it is their later achievements in the field of endeavour in which they are listed.

=== Arts and music ===
- Peter Bucknell (TC 1986) – filmmaker, author and classical violist
- Ronny Chieng (TC 2004) – comedian and actor
- Wu Chun (TC 1997) – actor, singer and model
- Sir Robert Fraser (TC 1924) – journalist, civil servant and first Director General of the British Independent Television Authority (ITV)
- Gideon Haigh (TC 1984) – journalist and author
- Melissa "Meow Meow" Gray (TC 1988) – actress, dancer and cabaret performer
- Red Hong Yi (TC 2004) – Malaysian artist
- David Lyons (TC 1994) – actor
- Jennifer Peedom (TC 1995) – documentary film maker
- Nell Pierce (TC 2008) – author, winner of the 2022 The Australian/Vogel Literary Award
- Nicholas McRoberts (TC 1995) – Australian composer and conductor
- Rob Sitch (TC 1980) – actor and film director
- Geoffrey Simon (TC 1965) – conductor
- Glenys Tomasetti (TC 1947 – singer-songwriter, author and political activist.)
- Angus Trumble (TC 1983 – art curator and gallery director)
- Jack Turner (TC 1986) – non-fiction writer and television documentary host
- Charles Zwar (TC 1928) – songwriter, composer, lyricist, pianist and music director

=== Business ===
- Clive Baillieu (TC 1909) – businessman and public servant
- Sir Wilfred Deakin Brookes CBE DSO (TC 1925) – Australian businessman, philanthropist, and Royal Australian Air Force officer.
- Sir Roderick Carnegie AC (TC 1951) – Australian businessman
- Robert Champion de Crespigny (TC 1969) – Australian businessman and founder of Normandy Mining Limited
- SirAndrew Grimwade CBE (TC 1949) – businessman and philanthropist
- Sir Gordon Colvin Lindesay Clark (TC 1919) – mining engineer and businessman
- Ananda Krishnan (TC 1956) – entrepreneur

=== Church and religion ===
- Thomas Armstrong (TC 1879) – Bishop of Wangaratta (1902–1927)
- Phillip Aspinall (TC 1985) – Archbishop of Brisbane (2002–present); Primate of the Anglican Church of Australia (2005–2014)
- Peter Carnley AC (TC 1962) – Archbishop of Perth and Primate of the Anglican Church of Australia (2000–2005)
- John Chisholm (TC 1940) – 10th Anglican Bishop of Melanesia (1968-75) and first Archbishop of the Province of Melanesia (1975)
- Horace Crotty (TC 1904) – 4th Anglican Bishop of Bathurst in Australia, 1928–1936
- Andrew Curnow AM (TC 1968) – 9th bishop of the Anglican Diocese of Bendigo
- Robert Dann (TC 1943) – 9th Anglican Archbishop of Melbourne
- Peter Elliott (TC 1962) – Australian bishop of the Catholic Church
- Kay Goldsworthy AO (TC 1981) – first woman ordained as a bishop in the Anglican Church of Australia
- James Grant (TC 1950) – Anglican bishop and Dean of Melbourne (1985–1999)
- Arthur Green (TC 1878) – Bishop of Grafton and Armidale, and later of Ballarat
- William Hancock (TC 1883) – Anglican priest and Archdeacon of Melbourne (1928–1935)
- Peter Hollingworth (TC 1955) – Archbishop of Brisbane, Governor General of Australia (2001–2003)
- Henry Langley (TC 1894) – Anglican Dean of Melbourne (1942–1947)
- Ken Leslie (TC 1929) – Anglican Bishop of Bathurst (1959–1981)
- Andrew McGowan (TC 1983) – Anglican theologian and academic
- John David McKie (TC 1928) – Anglican bishop
- George Long (TC 1896) – educationalist, military office, Anglican Bishop of Bathurst (1911–1928) and Anglican Bishop of Newcastle (1928–1930)
- Kenneth Bruce Mason (TC 1965) – Anglican Bishop of the Northern Territory
- William Perry French Morris (TC 1897) – Anglican priest and headmaster
- Charles Hebert Murray (TC 1918) – Anglican Bishop of Riverina (1944–1950)
- Kate Prowd (TC 1983) – Anglican bishop
- Thomas Thornton Reed (TC 1922) – Anglican Bishop of Adelaide
- Ronald Richards (non-res) – Anglican bishop, fifth Bishop of Bendigo (1957–1974)
- Hector Robinson (TC 1919) – Anglican Bishop of Riverina (1950–1965)
- William Sadlier (TC 1888) – Fourth Anglican Bishop of Nelson, New Zealand (1912–1934)
- Reginald Stephen (TC 1878) – Dean of Melbourne (1910–1914), Anglican Bishop of Tasmania (1914–1919) and Bishop of Newcastle (1919–1928)
- Andrew St. John, Assistant Bishop of Melbourne (1995−2001)
- John Stretch (TC 1872) – inaugural student; first Australian-born Anglican bishop in Australia
- Peter Stuart (TC 1987) – Anglican bishop, Bishop of Newcastle (2018–present)
- Alison Taylor (TC 2018) – Anglican bishop
- Richard Treloar (TC 1988) – Anglican bishop
- Lindsay Urwin (TC 1974) – Anglican bishop
- Alfred Roscoe Wilson (TC 1905) – Anglican bishop and Dean of Melbourne (1947–1953)
- Edward Wilton (TC 1893) – Anglican bishop, Assistant Bishop of Melanesia (1928–1929)
- Allen Winter (TC 1923) – Anglican bishop, Bishop of St Arnaud

=== Culture, education and society ===
- Geoffrey Badger (TC 1935) – Scientist and educationalist, Vice Chancellor, University of Adelaide (1967–1977)
- Arnold Buntine (TC 1919) – Educationalist, headmaster, military officer and Australian rules footballer
- Manning Clark AC (TC 1934) – Australia historian
- Frederick Sefton Delmer (TC 1889) – Australian linguist, university lecturer and journalist
- Peter Dodds(TC 1989) - Australian applied Mathematician
- Francis Barrington 'Barry' Hall (TC 1940) – Diplomat and ambassador
- Keith Hancock KBE (TC 1917) – Australian historian
- Peter Karmel AC CBE (TC 1940) – economist and professor
- Frank Cameron Jackson AO (TC 1961) – analytic philosopher and Emeritus Professor, School of Philosophy (Research School of Social Sciences) at Australian National University (ANU)
- Sir Harold Knight (TC 1948) – Australian economist and third governor of the Reserve Bank of Australia (1975–1982)
- Dame Leonie Kramer(TC 1942) – academic, educator and professor
- Gia Kuan (TC 2005) - entrepreneur, publicist and creative consultant
- Richard Larkins AC (TC 1961) – former vice-chancellor of Monash University
- Peter McPhee (TC 1966) – historian, former provost of the University of Melbourne
- Norval Morris (TC 1940) – Australian-educated United States law professor and dean of the University of Chicago Law School
- Ken Myer (TC 1939) – businessman, philanthropist and patron of the arts
- Rupert Myer (TC 1976) – businessman, philanthropist and patron of the arts
- George Odgers (TC 1941) – military officer, journalist and military historian
- Ted Ringwood (TC 1948) – geologist
- Charles Shain (non-res) – pioneer in the field of radio astronomy
- Alan George Lewers Shaw (TC 1935) – historian
- Florence Stawell (TC 1886) – classical scholar
- Angus Trumble (TC 1983) – art historian, curator, and author
- Mechai Viravaidya AO (TC 1960) – Thai social reformer
- Reginald Chester Wilmot (TC 1931) – historian and war correspondent
- Hugh White AO (TC 1971) – intelligence analyst, ministerial adviser, departmental official, and academic.
- Reginald Wilmot (TC 1889) – journalist and sports writer
- Godfrey Wilson (TC 1889) – military officer, politician and Vice Chancellor of Cambridge University (1935–1937)

=== Law ===
- Will Alstergren AO KC (TC 1985) – Australian jurist, Chief Justice of the Family Court of Australia and Chief Judge of the Federal Circuit Court of Australia
- John Batt AM (TC 1954) – Australian jurist and Court of Appeal justice, Supreme Court of Victoria
- Sir Charles Frederic Belcher OBE (TC 1894) – Australian lawyer and British colonial jurist
- George Dethridge (TC 1888) – inaugural Chief Judge of the Commonwealth Court of Conciliation and Arbitration
- Charles Leonard Gavan Duffy (TC 1899) – soldier and judge of the Supreme Court of Victoria (1933–1961)
- Philip Lewis Griffiths KC (TC 1898) – King's Counsel, jurist and Solicitor-General of Tasmania
- David Harper QC (TC 1963) – Queen's Counsel and Court of Appeals justice, Supreme Court of Victoria.
- Sir Edmund Herring(TC 1911) – Chief Justice of Victoria (1944–1964)
- Christian Jollie Smith (TC 1906) – solicitor and co-founder of The Communist Party of Australia
- Walter Langslow (TC 1919) – solicitor, mayor and soldier
- Julian McMahon AC (TC 1986) – barrister
- Kenneth Marks AM QC (TC 1941) – Queen's Counsel, former judge of the Supreme Court of Victoria and royal commissioner
- Chris Maxwell (TC 1971) – president of the Victorian Court of Appeal
- Sir Herbert Mayo (TC 1904) – Australian jurist and judge of the Supreme Court of South Australia
- Geoffrey Nettle AC (TC 1974) – judge of the High Court of Australia
- Morris Mondle Phillips (TC 1888) – a lawyer, taxing master and equity master at the Victorian Supreme Court
- James Richard William Purves (TC 1921) – lawyer and philatelist
- Christopher Roper (TC 1972) – legal educator and academic
- Ian Spry QC (TC 1958) – Queen's Counsel, legal author and academic
- Robert Tadgell AO QC (TC 1956) – Court of Appeal justice at the Supreme Court of Victoria
- Baron Augustus Uthwatt (TC 1896) – judge, Chancery Division, High Court of Justice; Lord of Appeal in Ordinary, House of Lords
- Sir Reginald Sholl (TC 1920) – lawyer, judge, diplomat, commentator
- Casimir Julius Zichy-Woinarski (TC 1885) – Australian lawyer and judge

=== Military and intelligence ===
- Edward Frederic Robert Bage (TC 1905) - polar explorer and military officer
- John Balmer (TC 1931) – senior officer and bomber pilot, Royal Australian Air Force (RAAF).
- Peter Barbour (TC 1947) – Director-General of Security, Australian Security Intelligence Organisation (ASIO)(1970–1975)
- Sir Roy Burston KBE (TC 1905) – Australian soldier, physician, and horse racing identity
- Richard Edmond Courtney CB VD (TC 1988) – military officer
- Norval Dooley (TC 1914) – Australian Army officer and solicitor
- Herbert 'Harry' Gibling Furnell (TC 1916) – Australian rules footballer, gynaecologist and Australian Army officer
- William Wallace Stewart Johnston (TC 1908) – military officer and medical practitioner
- Basil Morris (TC 1908) – military officer and Australian military administrator at Port Moresby, New Guinea
- Sir Frank Kingsley Norris (TC 1913) – military officer and physician
- Michael Thwaites AO (TC 1934) – poet, writer and intelligence officer
- Hugh White (TC 1971) – defence and intelligence analyst, author, and academic

=== Politics and government ===
- Sir Stanley Argyle (TC 1886) – 32nd Premier of Victoria (1932–1935)
- Austin Asche (TC 1946) – Administrator of the Northern Territory of Australia, third Chief Justice of the Supreme Court of the Northern Territory
- Charles Atkins (TC 1905) – Australian politician, Nationalist member for Denison, Tasmania.
- Llewellyn Atkinson (TC 1885) – politician
- Sir John Bloomfield (TC 1921) – Australian lawyer and politician
- Sir John Bunting (diplomat) AC KBE (TC 1937) – Australian public servant and diplomat
- Thomas Joseph Byrnes (non-res) – Premier of Queensland (1898)
- Richard Casey (TC 1909) – Governor General of Australia (1965–1969)
- Adrienne Clarke AC (TC 1955) – Lieutenant Governor of Victoria, botanist
- William Lionel Russell Clarke (TC 1895) – grazier and politician
- Sir Alan Currie (TC 1887) – politician
- Fred Grimwade (TC 1952) – politician
- Sir Rupert Hamer (TC 1935) – 39th Premier of Victoria (1972–1981)
- Ralph Gibson (TC 1924) – communist organiser and writer
- David Hawker AO (TC 1968) – politician, Liberal member of the Australian House of Representatives (1983–2010)
- Thomas Hollway (TC 1925) – 36th Premier of Victoria (1947–1950, 1952)
- Alan Hunt (TC 1946) – politician and member of the Victorian Legislative Council (1961–1992)
- Reginald Leeper (TC 1906) – British civil servant, diplomat and founder of the British Council
- George Maxwell (TC 1884) – lawyer and Australian politician
- Edward Reynolds (TC 1909) QC – politician
- Arthur Rylah (TC 1928) – Deputy Premier of Victoria
- Sir Keith Charles Owen Shann (TC 1936) – senior public servant and diplomat
- Clive Shields (TC 1897) – politician
- Sir Robert Southey (TC 1940) AO CMG – businessman and president of the Liberal Party, 1970–75
- Godfrey Wilson (TC 1889) – Australian-born British politician and academic
- Richard Woolcott AC (TC 1946) – Australian public servant and diplomat

=== Science and medicine ===
- Yvonne Aitken AM (TC 1930) – Australian agricultural scientist
- Lilian Helen Alexander (TC 1883) – the first female resident of the college and one of the first women to study medicine at the university
- Lucy Bryce (TC 1915) – Australian haematologist and medical researcher
- Constantine Trent Champion de Crespigny (TC 1903) – medical practitioner
- Peter Choong AO (TC 1979) – Australian doctor and Director of Orthopaedics, St. Vincent's Hospital, Melbourne
- Alistair Cameron Crombie (TC 1935) AC – zoologist and historian of science
- Derek Denton (TC 1943) – scientist
- Suzanne Duigan (TC 1943) – Australian paleobotanist
- Warren Ewens AO (TC 1955) – Australian-born mathematician, Professor of Biology, University of Pennsylvania
- Mavis Freeman (TC 1925) – Australian bacteriologist and biochemist
- Konrad Hirschfeld CBE (TC 1925) – Australian medical practitioner and surgeon
- Susan Lim (TC 1977) – Singaporean surgeon
- John Freeman Loutit (TC 1929) – haematologist and radiobiologist
- Dame Ella Macknight (TC 1923) – obstetrician and gynaecologist
- Sydney Fancourt McDonald (TC 1905) – paediatrician and army doctor
- Ainslie Meares (TC 1930) – psychiatrist, expert in the medical use of hypnotherapy
- Brendan Murphy (TC 1973) – Commonwealth Chief Medical Officer
- Richard Rawdon Stawell (TC 1882) – medical doctor, inaugural president of the Association of Physicians in Australasia
- Frank Douglas Stephens AO (TC 1931) – Australian surgeon and military officer
- Sir Sydney Sunderland CMG (TC 1932) – Australian medical science and Dean of Medicine, University of Melbourne
- Harvey Sutton (TC 1898) – athlete, Rhodes Scholar and public health physician
- Mimi Tang (TC 1982) – paediatric allergist immunologist and immunopathologist
- Paul Hamilton Wood (TC 1925) – cardiologist

=== Sport ===
- Ted à Beckett (TC 1927) – Australian Test cricketer
- Geoff Ainsworth (TC 1965) – Australian rules footballer
- Edward Cordner (TC 1906) – Australian rules footballer
- Harry Cordner (TC 1904) – Australian rules footballer
- Derwas Cumming (TC 1911) – Australian rules footballer and soldier
- William Denehy (TC 1907) – Australian rules footballer
- Colin Douglas-Smith (TC 1938) – Olympic rower
- Thomas Drew (TC 1899) – Australian cricketer
- Simon Fraser (TC 1906) – Australian sportsman, 1912 Olympian (rowing) and Australian rules footballer
- Eric Gardner (TC 1900) – Australian rules footballer
- John Neville Fraser (TC 1910) – Australian first-class cricketer, pastoralist and father of Australian Prime Minister Malcolm Fraser
- Mark Gardner (TC 1904) – Australian rules footballer
- Herbert Hunter (TC 1903) – champion athlete, Australian rules footballer and dental surgeon
- Frank Langley (TC 1901) – Australian rules footballer
- Gillon McLachlan (TC 1994) – CEO of the Australian Football League
- Chris Mitchell (TC 1965) – Australian rules footballer
- Arthur O'Hara Wood – tennis player, Australian champion
- Pat O'Hara Wood (TC 1911) – tennis player, Australian and Wimbledon champion
- Harry Ross-Soden (TC 1906) – rower, 1912 Olympian (rowing), and soldier
- Harold Stewart (TC 1895) – Australian rules footballer
- Geoff Tunbridge (TC 1953) – Australian rules footballer
- James Walker (TC 1997) – Australian rules football
- Rupert Wertheim (TC 1911) – tennis player
- Maldwyn Leslie Williams (TC 1904) – Australian rules footballer, medical and military officer
- James Grover Yewers (TC 1937) – Australian rules footballer

== Rhodes scholars ==
=== Students ===
- 1904: John Behan (Victoria), Hertford College, Oxford – Second Warden
- 1905: Harvey Sutton (Victoria), New College, Oxford
- 1912: Edmund Herring (Victoria), New College, Oxford
- 1920: Keith Hancock (Australia), Balliol College, Oxford
- 1930: John Freeman Loutit (Western Australia), St John's College, Oxford
- 1937: Michael Thwaites (Victoria), New College, Oxford
- 1972: Christopher Cordner (Victoria), University College, Oxford
- 1980: Elsdon Storey (Victoria), Magdalen College, Oxford
- 1994: Lisa Gorton (Australia), Merton College, Oxford
