= Jean van der Poel =

South African historian

Jean van der Poel (1904–1986) was a South African historian.

== Education ==
Van der Poel was born in Cape Town, Cape Colony. She studied at the University of Cape Town (UCT), completing her doctorate, on railways and customs policies, at the London School of Economics, for which she was awarded magnum cum laude and which won her the Royal Empire Society prize. Her doctorate studies were financed by the Donald Currie Memorial scholarship.

== Career ==
In 1929, van der Poel returned to South Africa and declined a position at UCT as lecturer for a post as history teacher. She took a very important role in the South African Teacher's Association. In 1938 she decided to move to UCT, where she became a senior lecturer in 1954 and was offered the King George V chair of history in the 1960s, which she declined. Jean van der Poel retired in 1969. She died on 3 August 1986.

== Published works ==
Some works are:

- Railway and Customs Policies in South Africa, 1885–1910, Longmans (1933)
- The Jameson Raid, Oxford University Press (1951)
- Selections From the Smuts Papers, vols 1–4 in collaboration with Professor WK Hancock, vols 5–7 alone, Cambridge University Press (1966–1973)
- Native Education in South Africa, Journal of the Royal African Society, Vol. 34, No. 136 (Jul., 1935), pp. 313–331.
