= Gia Kuan =

Fashion and arts publicist

Gia Kuan (Chinese: 關歆; born September 23, 1986) is a New Zealand-Taiwanese entrepreneur, publicist and creative consultant, known for her new wave approach to public relations, as well as the intersection between art and fashion in her work. She is the founder of Gia Kuan Consulting, a boutique communications and public relations agency located in Manhattan, New York City. New York Magazine has called Kuan a "downtown press maven".

== Early life and education ==
Kuan was born in Taipei, Taiwan, and raised between Santo Domingo, Dominican Republic and Auckland, New Zealand. After high school, she moved to Australia and studied Law, Communications and Art History at the University of Melbourne. During her time at Trinity College, Kuan juggled various jobs, including a promoter, hostess and an events organizer for nightclubs. She later attributed her communications and events management approach to her formative training in nightlife. In 2010, Kuan moved to New York and graduated with a second degree in Fashion Marketing at Parsons the New School for Design.

== Career ==
Kuan began her career in New York at Comme des Garcons, Dover Street Market, and public relations agency Nadine Johnson, heading the Arts and Culture department. In 2019, she became independent and established her namesake consultancy.

Kuan is recognized for her impact on the fashion industry, through her firm's representation of independent designers and democratization of fashion shows. Kuan has cited that she is heavily influenced by underground subcultures in her various upbringings, her work largely emphasizes on identity, gender and diversity representation in brands.

Kuan's portfolio includes her work with Liberian-American designer Telfar Clemens, Puppets and Puppets by artist Carly Mark, PRISCAVera, Fear of God by Jerry Lorenzo, and Barragan, and Kim Shui.

Kuan has been noted as a key figure shaping the fashion scene in New York City, through her approachability and unconventional ways of storytelling.

New York Magazine described Kuan as "Taking Over The NYC Fashion and Art Scene". She was dubbed by Document Journal as "New York's star publicist" and the "PR powerhouse behind New York's fashion renaissance".

In 2020, Kuan was featured as one of the new wave of fashion PR professionals in Vogue's September issue, with subject matters focusing on industry advocacy and change.

In 2020, Kuan was spotlighted in Wallet Magazine's cover story, which also featured conversations with Pierre Rougier, the founder of PR Consulting.

== Personal life ==
In 2019, Kuan was included in PAPER Predictions, Paper magazine's annual list of 100 influential people taking over the creative scene.

In 2019, Kuan also co-founded the New York-based art gallery Whaam! alongside her long-time partner Anatoly Kirichenko.

In her personal life, Kuan is known for her bold fashion style, hair colors and nail art. She currently lives in Manhattan, New York.
