= John Freeman Loutit =

Australian doctor

John Freeman Loutit CBE FRS FRCP (19 February 1910 – 11 June 1992), also known as 'Ian', was an Australian haematologist and radiobiologist.

== Life ==
John Freeman Loutit was born in Western Australia, the son of a locomotive engineer. He moved interstate for his tertiary education, entering residence at Trinity College, Melbourne, in 1929 while studying at the University of Melbourne.

He contributed significantly to the development of improved techniques for the storage and transfusion of blood during the Second World War. After the war he became a leading researcher in the then novel field of radiobiology. He established and ran the Medical Research Council's Radiobiology Unit at Harwell from 1947 to 1969. He gave the 1969 Bradshaw Lecture to the Royal College of Physicians on the subject of malignancies caused by radium.

He was elected a Fellow of the Royal Society in 1963. His candidature citation read:

Distinguished for his experimental studies of tissue transplantation after lethal doses of ionising radiation. Skilful experiments led Loutit to form the opinion that, contrary to the prevailing view, the survival of irradiated mice after the implantation of haematropoietic tissue was due to colonization by living cells. The truth of this interpretation has been rapidly confirmed. Loutit was the first to recognize 'secondary disease' in irradiated mice restored by the transplantation of foreign cells, and his interpretation of the disease as the consequence of a reaction of the grafted cells against their recipient is now accepted. Loutit has further shown that a substantial proportion of mice with leukaemia can be cured by whole body irradiation followed by the grafting of bone marrow cells. Earlier, he separated the mechanisms of origin of congenital haemolytics and acquired icterus and developed a practical method of increasing the storage time of bllod for transfusion. Loutit's work is fundamental to an understanding of the mechanism and repair of radiation injury and has important bearings on immunology and the study of leukaemias.

He died in 1992. He had married Thelma Salusbury in 1941; they had three children.

== See also ==
- Blood bank
