= Jack Turner (writer) =

Australian non-fiction writer & TV documentary host (born 1968)

Jack Charles Turner (born 1968) is an Australian non-fiction writer and television documentary host. His work focuses on international studies, especially relating historical societies to modern ones.

== Background ==
Jack Charles Turner was born in 1968 in Sydney, Australia. He lives with his wife, Helena Fraser (a graduate of St Antony's College, Oxford, class of 1995), their son Oscar, and daughter Zoe, in Geneva. He has also lived in Oxford, Madrid, Tbilisi, and New York City.

== Education ==
Turner graduated with a Bachelor of Arts degree in Classical Studies from The University of Melbourne, where he was a resident student at Trinity College. In 1992, he was elected as the "Australia at Large" Rhodes Scholar, and attended Oxford University. Graduate study allowed Turner to change his major area of research interest, and in 1994 he graduated from Magdalen College with a Master of Philosophy (MPhil) in International Relations. His masters thesis entitled Soviet New Thinking and the Cambodian Conflict was completed in the Department of Politics and International Relations. Turner then went on to graduate with a Doctor of Philosophy degree (DPhil) in International Relations from Oxford, being awarded the MacArthur Junior Research Fellowship in International Relations at Exeter College.

== Writings ==
Two years after receiving his Fellowship, Turner took a break from academia and took a professional job in Madrid, Spain. After three months, he quit and moved with his wife to Tbilisi, Georgia to write his first book. Throughout his studies, Turner was fascinated by how many times various spices appeared in historical references. That, combined with an early interest in spices, partly enhanced by his mother's spicy cooking, resulted in his decision to pursue the subject of spices further. The result is a book entitled Spice: The History of a Temptation, which traces spices back through time, through history, myth, archeology, and literature.

In the summer of 2000, he stated that he planned to base his next book on his experiences living in Caucasus.

== Career ==
Turner is the host of the What the Ancients Knew documentary series on The Science Channel. In the series, he visited key places from world history, focusing on the scientific, anthropologic, economic, and mechanical issues of the ancient civilizations and how their works influence modern life. The original three episodes covered the Romans, the Egyptians, and the Chinese. Later episodes covered the Japanese, the Greeks, and India.

== Bibliography ==
- Spice: The History of a Temptation (9 August 2005). ISBN 0-375-70705-0. Paperback. Vintage; Reprint edition, 384 pages.
- Spice: The History of a Temptation (21 March 2005). ISBN 0-00-655173-4. Paperback. Harper Perennial; New Ed edition, 448 pages.
- Spice: The History of a Temptation (10 August 2004). ISBN 0-375-40721-9. Hardcover. Knopf, 384 pages.
