= Nicholas McRoberts =

Australian classical composer and conductor (born 11977)

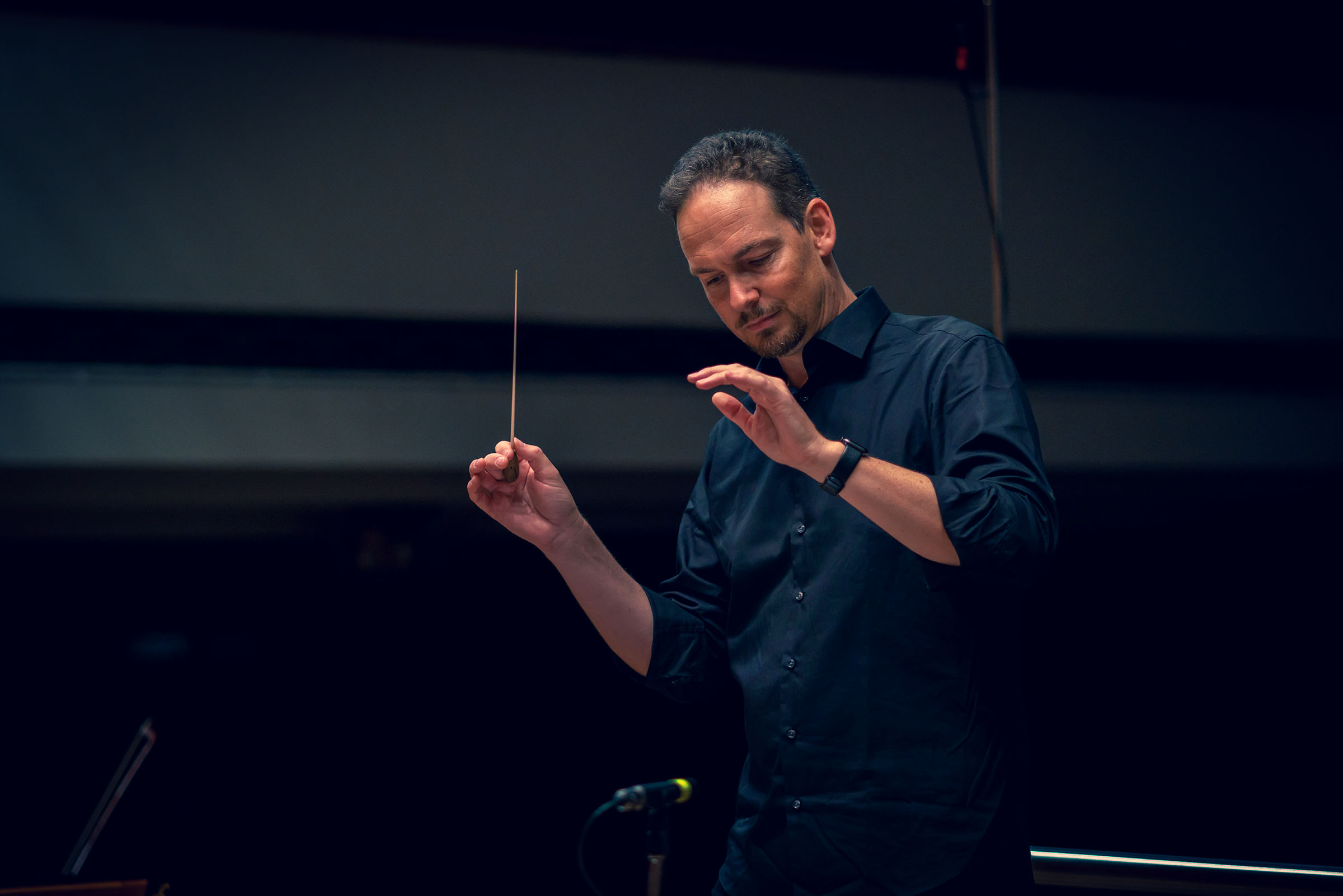
McRoberts (Sofia Philharmonic)

Nicholas Owen McRoberts (born 16 January 1977) is an Australian composer and conductor of classical music.

== Career ==
He studied music in Australia, before moving to Paris, France where he lives today.

In 2023 he founded Opéra Biarritz with the support of the city and acts as their artistic and musical director. Their original adaptation of La traviata received widespread praise. With Opéra Biarritz he has since conducted its New Year's concert and, in April 2026, a charity concert with the Basque choirs Oldarra and Itsasoa in aid of the restoration of Biarritz's Sainte-Eugénie church. In 2023 he conducted the Orchestre Demos Orchestre de Paris at the Philharmonie in Paris and was subsequently named as conductor for the 2024/2025 season.

His Symphony No. 1 "From the Old World" was premiered by the Sofia Philharmonic Orchestra on 27 August 2022 with the composer conducting.

His Adagio for Strings was commissioned for the Nürtinger Chamber Orchestra and first performed on 14 November 2021, conducted by Friederike Kienle. It was written during the Covid lockdowns and recorded with the Janáček Philharmonic in March 2021. The French première was given by the Ensemble Orchestral de Biarritz, conducted by Yves Bouillier in July 2022.

In September 2019 he was named conductor of the Orchestre Démos du Grand Verdun with the Philharmonie de Paris. In 2021, the Philharmonie commissioned a new work, Ozeano, which was premiered at the Cité de la Musique in June 2023.

In 2018 he was named artistic director of Opéra Montmartre in Paris.

In 2017 he collaborated with the French choreographer Nawel Oulad on a ballet Les Tisseuses de Silence and a duo Femme au Piano for the Semaine de la Danse in Paris which were performed in the Festival Les Aliennes and the Festival Appel de la Lune.

His Violin Concerto was recorded in 2017 with the Janáček Philharmonic Orchestra.

His operas include Lyon (2016) premiered by the Ruse State Opera in July 2016, and Nera (2017) adapted from the play Devojka Modre Kose (The Girl with the Midnight Blue Hair) written by the Serbian playwright Vida Ognjenović.

His composition "Festival Fanfare" was the recipient of the 2002 OpenBook Award for Sacred Music.

His works are published by Halcyon Publications in Paris.

== Biography ==
McRoberts was born in Melbourne in 1977 and grew up in Ballarat. He studied piano with Anna Jurkewicz and Bruce Keck while a student at Ballarat and Clarendon College. He went on to study piano and composition at the Melbourne Conservatorium, the Victorian College of the Arts and the Australian National Academy of Music. While tutoring at Trinity College, Melbourne, he founded the Trinity College Chamber Orchestra. He studied conducting with Robert Rosen, Jorma Panula and Dejan Savić. After moving to France, he continued studies at the Conservatoire de Paris (CNSMDP) under János Fürst and at the Ecole Normale (Conservatoire Cortot).

=== Operas ===
- Lyon (1996–2016)
- Nera (2017–2019)
- Merlin (2020–)

=== Orchestral ===
- The Traveller, orchestral suite (1995–)
- Symphony No. 1 in B minor (1999–2020)
- Violin Concerto (2016)
- Symphony No. 2 in G minor (2021–2023)

=== Chamber ===
- Diesque (1998)
- Adagio for Strings (2020–2021)

=== Ballet ===
- A Fairy Tale Begins (1998–)
- Les Tisseuses de silence (2017)
- Même les rêves ont peur de mourir (2018)

=== Piano ===
- Five Nocturnes (1998)
- 8 Préludes (2000)
- Serenade (2000)
- Cinq nocturnes (2020)

=== Vocal ===
- Keats Cycle (1993–2006)
- Valediction Forbidding Mourning (1995)
- French Songs (1995)
- Do Not Go Gentle (2002)
- Wild Nights – Dickinson Cycle (2018)

=== Organ ===
- Festival Fanfare (1997)
