= Richard Edmond Courtney =

Australian Army officer

- Born: 8 September 1870; Castlemaine, Victoria
- Died: 21 October 1919 (aged 49); Melbourne, Victoria
- Military career
- Allegiance: Australia
- Branch: Citizen Military Forces; Australian Imperial Force
- Rank: Lieutenant Colonel
- Commands: 14th Battalion (1914–15)
- Conflicts: First World War; Gallipoli Campaign
- Awards: Companion of the Order of the Bath; Mentioned in Despatches; Volunteer Officers' Decoration

Lieutenant Colonel Richard Edmond Courtney CB, VD (8 September 1870 – 21 October 1919) was an Australian soldier during the First World War. Courtney's Post, now the site of a Commonwealth War Graves Commission cemetery on the Gallipoli Peninsula, is named in his honour.

== Early life ==
Courtney was born in Castlemaine, Victoria and educated at Melbourne Church of England Grammar School. On 20 March 1888, he entered residence at Trinity College (University of Melbourne) as a first-year Arts student, and enrolled at Melbourne Law School a year later. He graduated BA (1893), LLB (1897), and qualified as a solicitor.

== First World War ==
He was raised in a military family, and joined the volunteer forces at an early age. For many years he was Lieutenant-Colonel commanding the Victorian Rifles, and was given command of the 46th Battalion in 1911, and later the 51st Battalion. At the outbreak of the First World War, Courtney was put in charge of the 14th Battalion of the Australian Imperial Force (AIF) during the Gallipoli Campaign. Courtney was Gallipoli for a period of only six weeks, but was Mentioned in Despatches in November 1915, and gazetted a Companion of the Order of the Bath in the same month for "distinguished service in the field".

Invalided first to Malta and then to England, on recovery he was placed in command of the Australian and New Zealand Base Depot at Weymouth. He returned to Australia, arriving in March 1916 and his appointment with the AIF was terminated on 22 May 1916. He was then appointed acting Camp Commandant for Western Australia 10 June, a post he held until 15 February 1919. In November 1918 he had used his powers as Acting -Commandant of the 5th Military District under the War Precautions Act 1914, to prohibit the sale or distribution of liquour between 9am and 9pm across the city of Perth.

== Later life ==
Following the Armistice he became Chief Clerk of the Victorian Branch Repatriation Department. He died of a brain haemorrhage in 1919, in Melbourne, and was buried with military honours in the Coburg Cemetery. His life and achievements are featured in Chapter 5 of the book The Courtneys, a Victorian Military Family, by Ron Austin (McCrae, Vic. : Slouch Hat Publications, 2009).
