= Alex Shain =

Australian astronomer

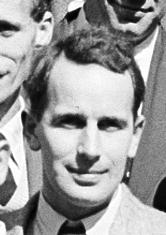
Shain at the International Union of Radio Science conference, Sydney 1952

Charles Alexander Shain (6 February 1922 – 11 February 1960) was an Australian pioneer in the field of radio astronomy.

Shain entered the University of Melbourne in 1940, studying physics, where he won a non-resident Exhibition to Trinity College. In 1942, for his final year, he moved into residence at Trinity on a Council Minor Scholarship, graduating at the end of the year with a BSc.

With Australia at war, Shain joined the Second Australian Imperial Force, but was discharged in 1943 on medical grounds. He then worked on radio countermeasures at the Australian Commonwealth Scientific and Industrial Research Organisation (CSIRO) Radiophysics Laboratory. Following the war, he entered the field of decametre radio astronomy. He was a pioneer in the study of absorption in H II regions as well as the effects of the ionosphere on radio signals. He died of cancer, leaving behind a wife and three children.
