= Courtney's and Steel's Post Cemetery =

WWI CWGC cemetery in Gallipoli

Coordinates: 40°14′08″N 26°17′20″E

Courtney's and Steel's Post
- Commonwealth War Graves Commission
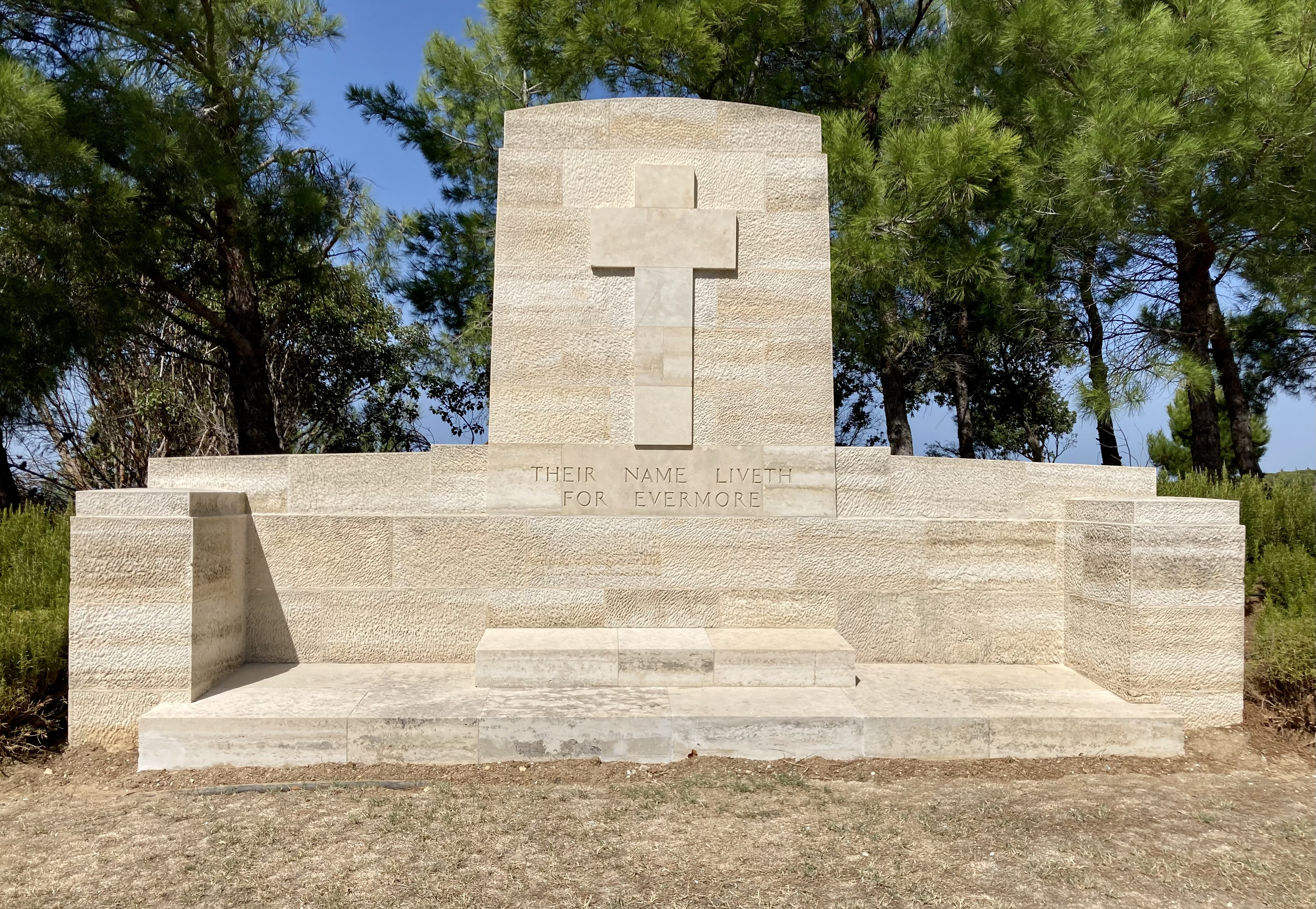
- Used for those deceased April–December 1915
- Established: 1919
- Location: near Gallipoli, Turkey
- Total burials: 225
- Unknowns: 160

Burials by nation
- Allied Powers: Australia: 60; British: 4; New Zealand: 1

Burials by war
- World War I: 225

Courtney's and Steel's Post Cemetery is a Commonwealth War Graves Commission cemetery located near ANZAC Cove on the Gallipoli peninsula in Turkey. It contains the graves of some of the former British Empire troops who died during the Gallipoli Campaign.

The campaign lasted eight months and was fought by British Empire and French forces against the Ottoman Empire in an attempt to force Turkey out of the war and to open a supply route to Russia through the Dardanelles and the Black Sea.

British, French and other Allied troops landed on the Gallipoli Peninsula on 25 April 1915 at Cape Helles in the south whilst Australian and New Zealand troops (the ANZAC corps) landed on the west coast. Courtney's Post was named after Lieutenant-Colonel Richard Courtney of the 14th Australian Infantry Battalion who took command of it on 27 April. Steel's Post, named after Major Thomas Steel was just to the South West of it. Both positions were captured on the day of the landings and held until the Allies withdrew in December. The cemetery contains special memorials to 58 casualties believed to be buried amongst 160 unidentified graves.

== Spelling ==
Steel's Post was officially, but incorrectly, named Steele's Post. The inscription on the cemetery follows this spelling and labels it Courtney's and Steele's Post but the CWGC lists the cemetery as Courtney's and Steel's Post.
