= Harry Furnell =

Australian rules footballer

- Born: 24 October 1898; Maryborough, Victoria
- Died: 22 November 1973 (aged 75); East Melbourne, Victoria
- Military career
- Allegiance: Australia
- Branch: Citizen Military Forces; Second Australian Imperial Force
- Service years: 1923–1951
- Rank: Brigadier
- Commands: 2/2nd Field Ambulance (1939–41)
- Conflicts: Second World War; North African campaign; Western Desert campaign; Siege of Tobruk; Second Battle of El Alamein; South West Pacific theatre; New Guinea campaign
- Awards: Commander of the Order of the British Empire; Distinguished Service Order; Efficiency Decoration; Mentioned in Despatches (5)
Australian rules football career
Personal information
- Original team: University Blacks
Playing career^{1}
Years	Club	Games (Goals)
1918–19	Carlton	13 (16)
- ^{1} Playing statistics correct to the end of 1919.

Brigadier Herbert Giblin Furnell, CBE, DSO, ED (24 October 1898 – 22 November 1973) was an Australian physician, army officer, and an Australian rules footballer who played for the Carlton Football Club in the Victorian Football League (VFL).

Born in Maryborough, Victoria, Furnell won a scholarships to Geelong Church of England Grammar School and then entered Trinity College (University of Melbourne) where he completed his medical degrees, graduating in 1921.

During the Second World War, Furnell served with the Australian Army Medical Corps, and was in command of the 2/2nd Field Ambulance, serving in Libya where he was awarded the Distinguished Service Order. Promoted to colonel, he served at Tobruk and El Alamein, and then in New Guinea with the rank of brigadier, being mentioned in despatches no fewer than five times and being appointed a Commander of the Order of the British Empire.
