= Thomas Drew (cricketer) =

Australian cricketer

Personal information
- Born: 9 June 1875; Kooringa, Australia
- Died: 9 January 1928 (aged 52); Toowoomba, Australia
- Source: Cricinfo, 31 October 2018

Thomas Drew (9 June 1875 – 9 January 1928) was an Australian cricketer. He played four first-class matches for South Australia between 1897 and 1903.

== Personal life ==
Drew entered Trinity College in 1899, while studying medicine at the University of Melbourne. He graduated in 1901 with a Bachelor of Medicine, and in 1905 married Blanche Ada Smith in London, daughter of J.H. Smith, former Commissioner of the South Australian Railways.

In 1928, while employed as medical officer for the Australian Mutual Provident Society, Drew died from what was determined to be a case of accidental morphia poisoning.It was thought that he had used morphine to help him fall asleep after complaining of feeling unwell. He was found unconscious and struggling to breathe and, although taken to the hospital, died shortly after arrival. He was 52 years old.

== See also ==
- List of South Australian representative cricketers
