= A. G. L. Shaw =

Australian historian (1916–2012)

A. G. L. Shaw AO FAHA FASSA FRAHS FRHSV
- Born: Alan George Lewers Shaw; 3 February 1916; Melbourne, Victoria, Australia
- Died: 5 April 2012 (aged 96); Melbourne, Victoria, Australia
- Spouse: Peggy Perrins Shaw (m. 1956; died 2009)

Academic background
- Education: University of Melbourne; Christ Church, Oxford

Academic work
- Discipline: History
- Sub-discipline: Australian history; colonial history
- Institutions: University of Melbourne; University of Sydney; Monash University

Alan George Lewers Shaw AO FAHA FASSA FRAHS FRHSV (3 February 1916 – 5 April 2012) was an Australian historian and author of several text books and historiographies on Australian and Victorian history. He taught at the University of Melbourne and the University of Sydney, and was professor of history at Monash University from 1964 until his retirement in 1981.

== Early life ==
Shaw was born in Melbourne on 3 February 1916 to George Shaw, a solicitor, and his wife Ethel née Lewers. Shaw was educated at Melbourne Grammar School, where he was on the debating team, played violin in the orchestra and was awarded the Frank Grey Smith Scholarship for Classics or Modern Languages. He entered Trinity College at the University of Melbourne in 1935, where he was president of the Dialectic Society in 1938. After graduating as a Bachelor of Arts (BA) with first-class honours in history and political science, Shaw tutored at Trinity College before leaving for further study at Christ Church, Oxford, graduating BA (later MA) with first-class honours in philosophy, politics, and economics in 1940. While there, he was a member of the Oxford Union and the Oxford University Music Society.

== Academic career ==
Shaw returned to Australia in 1940, working for the federal Departments of Information, Army and Post-War Reconstruction. From 1941, alongside these government positions, Shaw returned to Melbourne University as part-time lecturer in economic history and tutor at Trinity College. During 1944 Shaw was appointed as joint acting dean of Trinity College, and as dean in 1947. Shaw was captain of the squash team, and vice-president of the Dialectic Society at Trinity from 1941 to 1950. In 1946, Shaw became lecturer in modern history. He was associate editor of the journal Historical Studies (now Australian Historical Studies) from 1949 to 1951, and was a member of its editorial board. In 1950 he was awarded a Nuffield Dominion Travelling Fellowship and spent a year undertaking research in England into Australia's convict period.

On his return to Australia in 1952, Shaw became senior lecturer in history at the University of Sydney, and from 1953 to 1956 was sub-warden at St Paul's College. He was the inaugural president of the History Teachers' Association of New South Wales from 1960 to 1964, and was co-editor of its journal, Teaching History. While in Sydney, he served on the council of the Royal Australian Historical Society, and was editor of their journal from 1954 to 1964. He was the first professionally trained historian to edit the journal.

In the early 1960s Shaw was called upon to adjudicate on the long-running Australian TV quiz show Pick A Box when contestant Barry Jones disputed the answer given to the question "Who was the first British Governor-General of India?".

Shaw returned to an academic position in Melbourne in 1964 as professor of modern history at Monash University, only three years after teaching commenced there. He held this post until his retirement in 1981, at which time he was granted the status of emeritus professor. He served as a member of the Monash University Council from 1977 to 1979 and again from 1989 to 1991. He was general editor of the three-volume official history of Victoria published for the state's sesquicentenary in 1984. For the Australian Academy of the Humanities and the Academy of the Social Sciences in Australia he edited a series of lectures in celebration of the sesquicentenary, published as Victoria's Heritage (1986).

== Reputation and service ==
A review of his History of the Port Phillip District (1996) thought it a "meticulously researched and carefully crafted work which Shaw's earlier writings have led us to expect." The reviewer in Australian Historical Studies noted that Shaw handed his sources "judiciously, scrupulously and respectfully," and that "in another ninety-four years, men and women will still be turning to Shaw's work with faith and confidence".

In 1987 Shaw was elected president of the Royal Historical Society of Victoria, and also served as a member of their finance, fellowship, speakers and editorial committees. Upon his resignation in 1991, the society thanked him for the "benefit of his wise counsel, erudition, discernment and gentle humour,"

Shaw helped found the Friends of the La Trobe Library, now incorporated as the State Library Foundation, and was president of the C.J. La Trobe Society from 2002 to 2003. The State Library of Victoria recognised his contributions in the naming of its annual "AGL Shaw Summer Research Scholarships". The RHSV and the La Trobe Society also conduct a joint annual A.G.L. Shaw lecture in his honour.

Shaw was a benefactor to Melbourne Opera, and, due to his long association through art connections of his wife, Peggy Perrins Shaw (1917–2009), a major supporter and benefactor of the National Gallery of Victoria, creating the Shaw Research Library, now home to over 50,000 volumes. In his retirement, he did not give up teaching altogether, presenting lectures for the University of the Third Age (U3A) for many years.

== Honours and awards ==
Shaw was elected as a fellow of the Academy of Social Sciences of Australia (FASSA) in 1967, a Foundation Fellow of the Australian Academy of the Humanities (FAHA) in 1969, a fellow of the Royal Historical Society of Victoria (FRHSV) in 1973, a fellow of the Royal Australian Historical Society in 1979, and as the first fellow of the Federation of Australian Historical Societies in 1998. In 2002, having sat on the editorial board from its formation in 1960 until 1999, as well as being section editor for the first two volumes and contributing ten articles, he was awarded the inaugural Medal of the Australian Dictionary of Biography.

In the 1982 Queen's Birthday Honours, Shaw was made an Officer of the Order of Australia (AO) for services to education. He was bestowed with an Honorary Doctor of Letters (HonLittD) from the University of Newcastle in 1984.

At Trinity College, Shaw was elected an honorary fellow in 1983 and elevated to senior fellow in 2011. In 1962 the distinguished artist John Olsen completed an oil portrait of Shaw, which, since 2007 when Shaw donated it to Trinity College, has been part of the college's art collection.

== Public offices held ==
- Council of the Royal Australian Historical Society (1954–1958, 1960–1962, 1964)
- President of the History Teachers' Association of New South Wales (1960–1964)
- Council of the Royal Historical Society of Victoria (1965–1971)
- Trinity College Council (1968–1978 and 1984–2005)
- Inaugural president of the Australian Historical Association (1973–1974)
- Member of the Library Council of Victoria (1976–1985)
- Monash University Council (1977–1979 and 1989–1991)
- President of the Academy of Social Sciences of Australia (1978–1981)
- Chairman of the Public Records Advisory Council of Victoria (1979–1986)
- Chairman of the History and Literary Committee of the 150th Anniversary of Victoria Celebrations (1980–1983)
- Associate editor for Australia of the New Dictionary of National Biography (1984–2002)
- President of the Royal Historical Society of Victoria (1987–1991)
- President of the C. J. La Trobe Society (2002–2003)

== Bibliography ==
=== Books ===
- Economic Controls and Australia (Australian Army Education Service, ca. 1944)
- The Economic Development of Australia (1944)
- The Empire (Australian Army Education Service, ca. 1945)
- Australia and the British Commonwealth (RAAF Educational Services, ca. 1946)
- (with G R Bruns) The Australian Coal Industry (University of Melbourne, 1947)
- Our Coal (1949)
- The Story of Australia (1955)
- Modern World History: Social, Political and Economic Development, 1780–1950 (1959)
- (with H.D. Nicholson) An Introduction to Australian History (1961)
- Emergence and Expansion: A Modern World History (1964)
- Convicts and the Colonies: A Study of Penal Transportation from Great Britain and Ireland to Australia and other Parts of the British Empire (1966)
- (with H.D. Nicholson) Growth and Development in Australia: An Introduction to Australian History (1966)
- Heroes and Villains in History: Governors Darling and Bourke in New South Wales (1966)
- Clark, C. M. H.; Shaw, A. G. L., eds. (1967). Australian dictionary of biography : volume 2 : 1788–1850, I-Z. Melbourne: Melbourne University Press.
- A Short History of Australia: Part 1 (1967)
- (with H.D. Nicholson) Australia in the Twentieth Century: An Introduction to Modern Society (1967).
- Great Britain and the Colonies, 1815–1865 (1970)
- Ralph Darling (1971)
- Sir George Arthur, Bart, 1784–1854 (1980)
- Reflections on Australian History and its Writings (1985)
- (ed.) Victoria’s Heritage (AAH and ASSA, 1986)
- (ed.) Gipps – La Trobe correspondence 1839–1846 (1989)
- History of the Port Phillip District (1996)

== See also ==
- Anne Gillespie Shaw
