= Vera Scantlebury Brown =

Australian pediatrician (1889–1946)

Vera Scantlebury Brown OBE MBBS MD
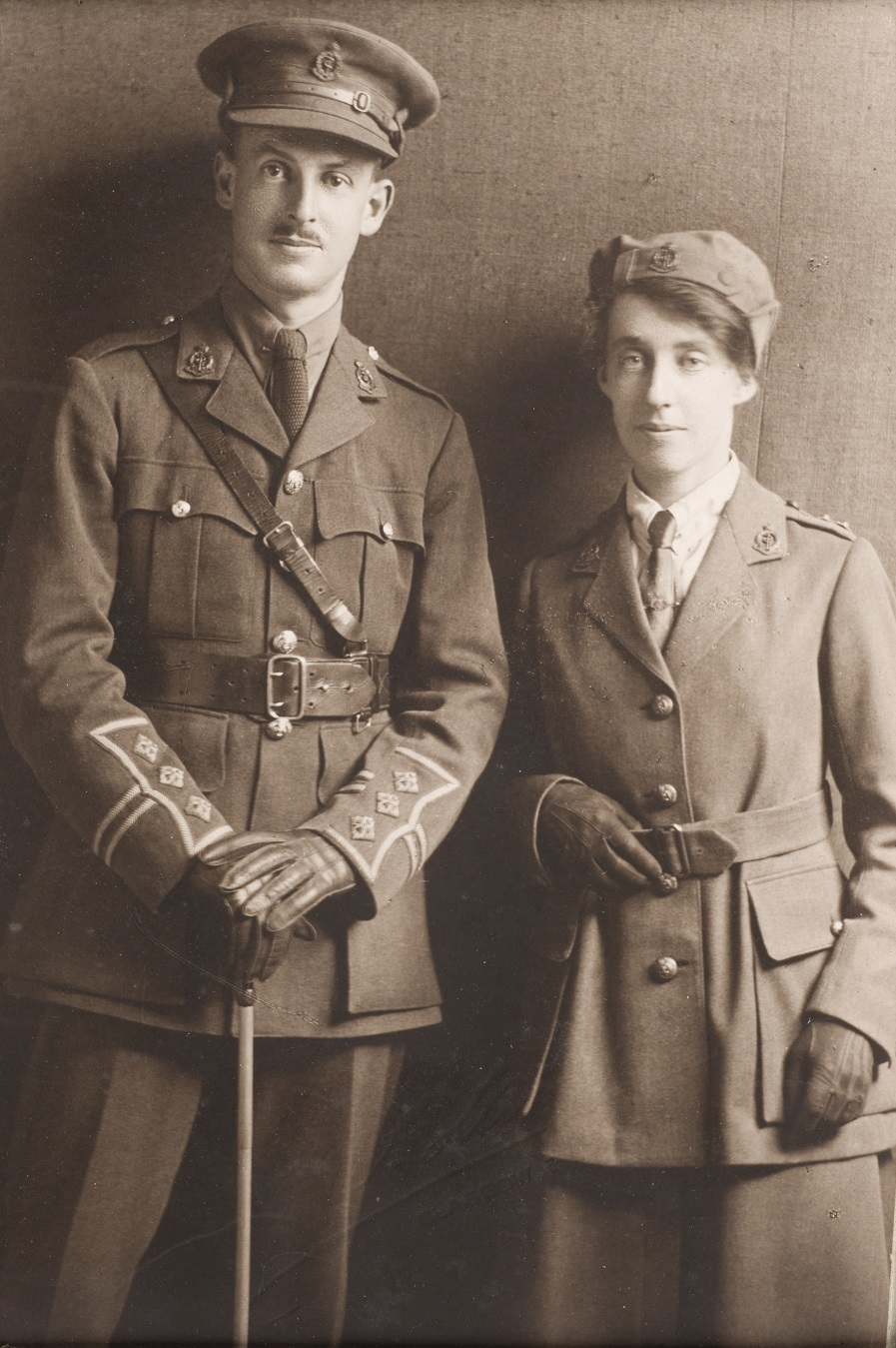
- Lieutenant (Dr) Vera Scantlebury and her brother Captain George Clifford Scantlebury
- Born: 7 August 1889
- Died: 14 July 1946 (aged 56)
- Military career
- Branch: Royal Army Medical Corps
- Rank: Lieutenant
- Unit: Endell Street Military Hospital

Vera Scantlebury Brown OBE MBBS MD (7 August 1889 – 14 July 1946) was an Australian medical practitioner and pediatrician in Victoria, Australia.

== Early life and education ==
Vera Scantlebury was born in Linton, Victoria, 7 August 1889. Her parents were George James and Catherine Millington (née Baynes) Scantlebury. She was educated at Toorak College before entering medical school at the University of Melbourne. She graduated Bachelor of Medicine and Bachelor of Surgery (MBBS) in 1914.

== Career ==
Scantlebury Brown became resident medical officer at the Melbourne Hospital. "Dr Vera", as she was commonly known, then moved to the Children's Hospital in 1915, where she was appointed senior medical officer. before leaving for England in 1917 to join the Royal Army Medical Corps where she reached the rank of Lieutenant, and was attached to the Endell Street Military Hospital as an assistant surgeon to Louisa Garrett Anderson.

Scantlebury Brown returned to Victoria in 1919 and worked in a variety of honorary positions including an honorary anaesthetist at the Women's Hospital, and honorary clinical assistant at the Children's Hospital, an honorary physician/surgeon at the Queen Victoria Hospital, and a medical inspector at the Church of England Girls' Grammar School. Scantlebury Brown was also associated with the Victorian Baby Health Centres Association and the Free Kindergarten Union of Victoria.

In 1921, Scantlebury Brown was appointed part-time medical officer in charge of the city baby health centres and in 1924 she became a doctor of medicine. In 1925, together with Henrietta Main, a doctor from England who had come to Australia to research child welfare work and methods with Truby King, she was sent by the Victorian Government to conduct a survey of the welfare of women and children in New Zealand and Victoria. Scantlebury Brown and Main's report led to the establishment of the Infant Welfare Division in the Department of Public Health.

Scantlebury Brown married University of Melbourne lecturer (later associate professor) Dr. Edward Byam Brown on 18 September 1926, and they had two children. She was appointed the first Director of Infant Welfare for the Victorian Department of Health in 1926. She remained dedicated to this position until her death. In 1927 she and Mary Valentine Gutteridge wanted to improve the health of kindergarten children. They organised visits by dentists and doctors and they created the Forest Hill holiday-home

In 1937, following Scantlebury Brown report on infant welfare for the National Health and Research Council, the Commonwealth Government allocated £100,000 for the benefit of pre-school children, from the Coronation Commemoration Grant. In 1938 the Australian Association of Pre-School Child Development was established, together with the Lady Gowrie Child Centres. The preventive work carried out at these centres in all states was largely the result of Dr. Scantlebury Brown's efforts.

In 1944, pre-school activities including payment of subsidies to free kindergartens were also placed under Scantlebury Brown's supervision, and her vision and enthusiasm achieved a further success in 1945, when the State Government decided to bring under the Health Department the care of expectant mothers and all children to six years of age.

- 1914 - 1915 Resident Medical Officer of the Melbourne Hospital
- 1915 - 1917 Resident Medical Officer and Senior Medical Officer of the Children's Hospital Melbourne
- 1917 - 1919 Attached Royal Army Medical Corps, Endell Street Military Hospital, London, England
- 1920 - Resident Medical Officer of the Women's Hospital, Melbourne
- 1920 - 1922 Honorary Anaesthetist of the Women's Hospital, Melbourne
- 1920 - 1924 Honorary Clinical Assistant, Children's Hospital, Melbourne
- 1920 - 1926 Honorary physician and surgeon, Queen Victoria Hospital, Melbourne
- 1920 - 1946 Medical Inspector, Church of England Grammar School, Melbourne
- 1921 - Part-time medical officer in charge of city baby health centres
- 1924 - Awarded degree of doctor of medicine
- 1925 - Appointed with Dr. Henrietta Main, by the Victoria Government, to report on the welfare of Victorian women and children
- 1926 - 1946 (death) Director of Infant Welfare Victoria at Department of Public Health

== Awards and honours ==
Scantlebury Brown was honoured with her appointment as an Officer of the Order of the British Empire on 9 June 1938 for her work in the fields of infant and maternal welfare. She was posthumously inducted onto the Victorian Honour Roll of Women in 2001.

Golden Plains Shire commemorated Scantlebury Brown by commissioning a life-sized sculpture of her to be housed on the Avenue of Honour in her birth town of Linton, Victoria.

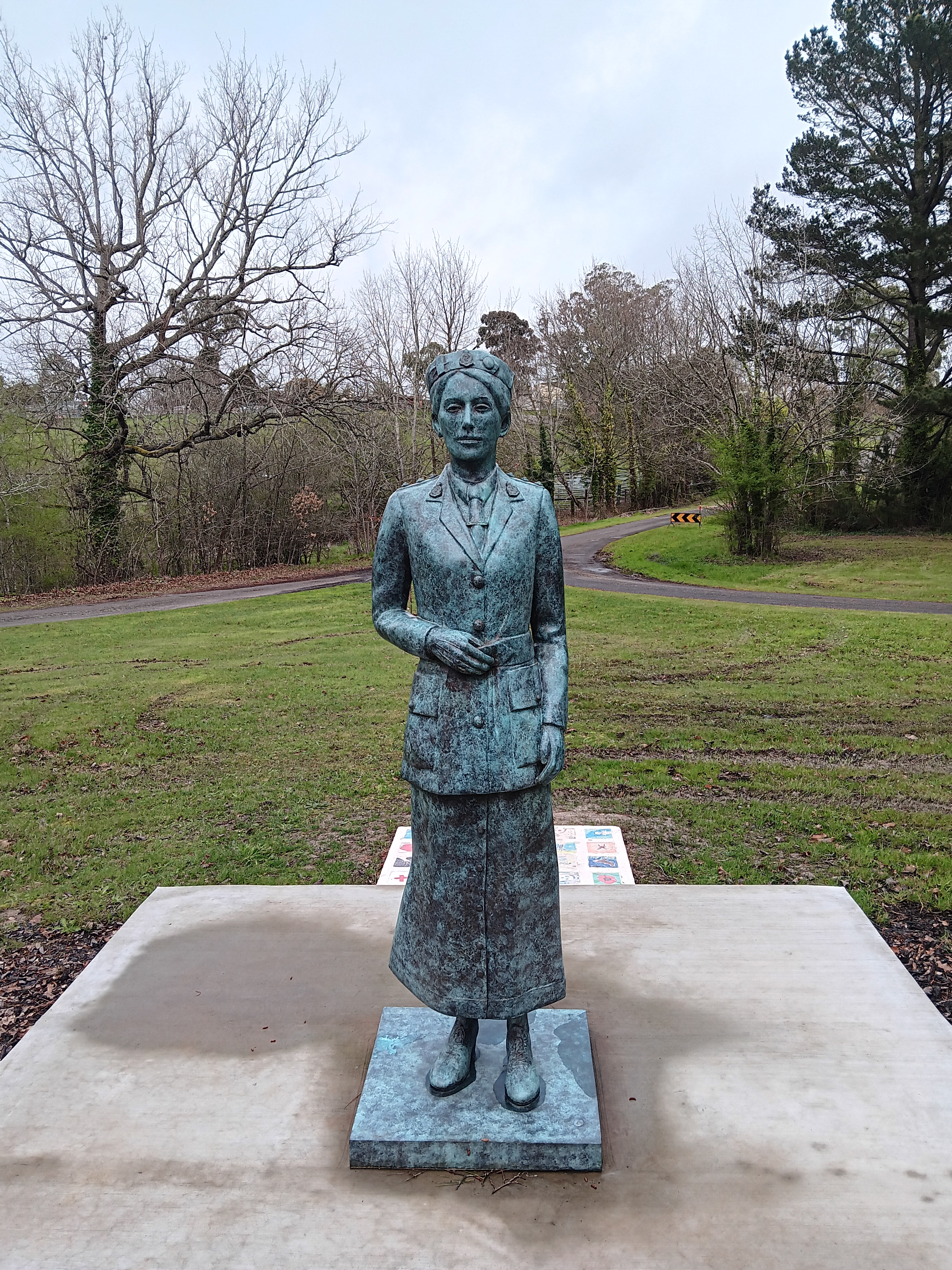
Statue of Dr Vera Scantlebury-Brown at Linton, Victoria

== Selected works ==
- Brown, Vera Scantlebury, Pre-school child: "model exhibit" of sample toys and occupations for children of different ages up to 5 years of age, H.E. Daw, Government Printer, Melbourne, 1943
- Brown, V. S. & Kate Campbell, A guide to the care of the young child, infant and pre-school ages: for students of infant welfare, Dept. of Health, Division of Maternal, Infant and Pre-School Welfare, Melbourne, 1947, 266 pages
