= John Behan =

John Behan may refer to:

- John Behan (educationist) (1881–1957), Australian educationalist and lawyer
- John Behan (sculptor) (born 1938), Irish sculptor
- Johnny Behan (1844–1912), Cochise County sheriff involved in the Gunfight at the O. K. Corral
