= Baroness White =

Baroness White may refer to:

- Eirene White, Baroness White (1909–1999), British Labour politician and journalist
- Sharon White, Baroness White of Tufnell Park (born 1967), British businesswoman, civil servant and life peer

== See also ==
- Vera Deakin White (189–1978), known as Lady White, Australian humanitarian
