= Kathleen Jones =

Kathleen Jones may refer to:

- Kathleen Jones (writer), English poet, biographer, and fiction writer
- Kathleen Jones (academic) (1922–2010), British professor of social policy
- Kathleen de Leon Jones (born 1977), Filipino-Australian actress and singer
- Kathleen Lloyd Jones (1898–1978), Welsh-born garden designer and nurserywoman
- Kathleen Gilman Jones, British educationist
