= Mary Ellinor Lucy Archer =

Australian librarian and botanist (1893–1979)

Mary Ellinor Lucy Archer MBE
- Born: 13 November 1893; Malvern, Victoria, Australia
- Died: 3 May 1979 (aged 85); Toorak, Victoria, Australia
- Education: Melbourne University
- Known for: CSIRO's first woman scientist
- Scientific career
- Fields: Botany, librarianship
- Workplaces: CSIRO

Mary Ellinor Lucy Archer MBE (13 November 1893 – 3 May 1979) was an Australian scientist and librarian. She was the first woman scientist of the CSIRO (Commonwealth Scientific and Industrial Research Organisation) and served as its chief librarian from 1923 to 1954, for which she was made a Member of the Order of the British Empire (MBE) in 1956.

== Early life ==
Archer was born on 13 November 1893 in Malvern, Victoria, Australia, to English civil engineer Oakeley Archer and Lucy Georgina Elizabeth, née Gaunt, and spent her childhood in Malaya. Her mother was Principal of the Trinity College Women's Hostel (later called Janet Clarke Hall) from 1906 to 1918.

Archer attended Melbourne Girls Grammar School and Melbourne University (B.Sc. 1916; M.Sc. 1918), and after graduating, taught botany at Trinity College. She was known professionally as Ellinor Archer.

== Career ==
In November 1918, Archer was appointed to the Seed Improvement Committee of the Advisory Council of Science and Industry (Commonwealth Institute of Science and Industry from 1920) as secretary and investigator. It is thought she wrote their bulletins (1922–23) on improving crops and classifying barleys, oats, and wheat. In May 1923 Archer was given charge of the institute's library, but following the Council for Scientific and Industrial Research's inauguration (1926) her role was reclassified in 1929 to librarian and scientific assistant. When appointed in 1923, Archer was the only librarian in the organisation.

With little librarianship training, but with great administrative skills, she turned scattered collections into a smooth running system of libraries. As Citrus Preservation Committee secretary she compiled an agricultural research register; was effectively head librarian of divisional and experimental stations' libraries. From 1936 to 1937 she visited British scientific libraries to learn from their scientific libraries and about modern methods of librarianship. This included the universal decimal classification which she later introduced at the CSIRO. She created a union catalogue – a great unifying force for CSIRO Libraries, basis of the National Union Catalogue of Monographs (1960).

Archer was named as Chief Librarian January 1946 and continued in the role until 1954. At the time of Archer's retirement in 1954, she had built 36 CSIRO library branches across Australia with 70 women librarians employed.

=== Contribution to the library sector ===
Archer made a lasting contribution to the library profession as a foundation member of the Australian Institute of Librarians (1937) and as the first female president (1948–49). She was also the President of the Victorian branch in 1945. Despite not having any formal library education, in 1941, Archer established the examination branch of the Institute.

In 1949, the Institute was reconstituted as the Library Association of Australia (now the Australian Library and Information Association) with Archer as an active past president. Archer had a particular interest in special libraries, signing a petition in 1951 for the establishment of a Special Libraries Section, which was formed in the same year. She continued demonstrating concern for special librarians, insisting their interests be included in the national examination system. Believing it important for special groups to be active participants in the Association, she led the way, holding many L.A.A. Victorian and National positions.

She was admired as an intelligent and energetic person taking on conflicts she felt necessary. When CSIRO division heads wanted their own libraries she played a major role in selecting candidates, ensuring they had sufficient autonomy enabling development of abilities and initiatives, whilst building a cohesive library system. Archer's keen interest in information exchange was reflected in her support of Inter-Library Loans and promotion of uniform codes and standard forms. In a rare article she wrote about Inter-Library Loans in the Australian Library Journal and speaking at L.A.A.'s 8th Conference (1955).

As a prominent Australian Special Librarian running a national library system she travelled widely, advocating membership of the Library Association and promoting education of librarians. While establishing CSIRO's Perth library (1954) she visited other special libraries offering advice.

Archer said she became a librarian by accident – but was a successful librarian and senior administrator in an organization with few women in senior positions. For her, libraries were about people as much as about books stating "We cannot have pride and satisfaction in our work unless we are adequately trained to cope with it. ... giving ourselves to work with interest and enthusiasm, ..... making libraries and librarianship a real force in the community." (Presidential Address 1949).

== Death and memorialisation ==
After retiring on 17 December 1954, Archer continued botanical studies, painting, walking, and supporting Save the Children Fund by collecting and selling books. She was made a Member of the Order of the British Empire in 1956 for her "unique contribution to the development of scientific libraries in Australia." She died at Toorak, Melbourne on 3 May 1979.

The Ellinor Archer Pioneer Award is one of the Australian Library and Information Association's highest awards, and is presented to a person or institution pioneering new areas of library and information science (one-off product, new service or program or development of an existing service), incorporating a future-oriented approach.

On 12 November 2022, Archer was memorialised with a Google Doodle to celebrate her lifetime achievements. A meeting room at the CSIRO's Clayton campus is named after her.

== Bibliography ==
- Whyte, Jean P. (1993). "Archer, Mary Ellinor Lucy (1893–1979)". Australian Dictionary of Biography. Vol. 13. National Centre of Biography, Australian National University. ISBN 978-0-522-84459-7. ISSN 1833-7538. OCLC 70677943.
- 'Ellinor Archer by some former members of her staff' Australian Library Journal v. 22: 10 Nov. 1973 pp 415–17
- 'Obituary' Australian Library Journal v. 28:15 7 September 1979 pp. 288–289
- Special Libraries section Australian Library Journal v. 1 Jan 1952 pp 64–67
- Streamlining interlibrary reference work: a plea for standardization Australian Library Journal issue 2 July 1953 pp 78–81
