= Margaret Blackwood =

Australian botanist and geneticist

Dame Margaret Blackwood DBE
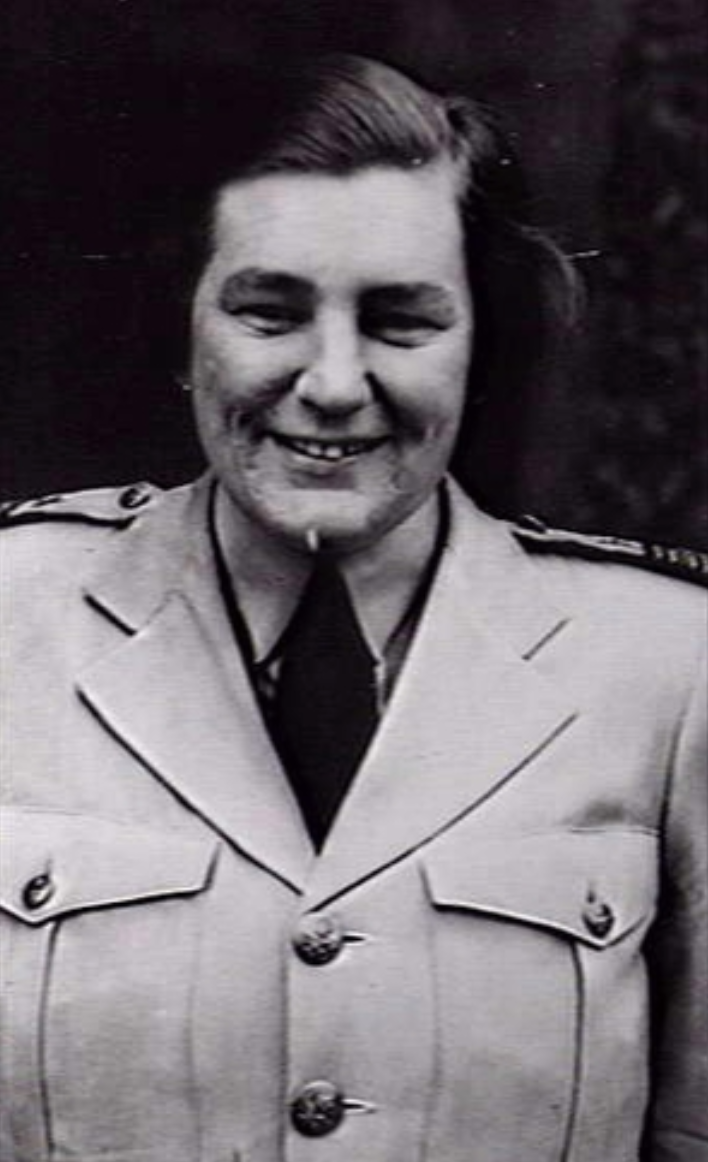
- Squadron Officer Margaret Blackwood, Commanding Officer of No.1 WAAF Training Depot, Larundel, 1944
- Born: 26 April 1909; South Yarra, Victoria
- Died: 1 June 1986 (aged 77); East Melbourne, Victoria
- Education: Melbourne Girls' Grammar School; University of Melbourne
- Scientific career
- Fields: botany, genetics
- Workplaces: University of Melbourne

Dame Margaret Blackwood DBE (26 April 1909 – 1 June 1986) was an Australian botanist and geneticist. She attended the University of Melbourne and lectured there for the majority of her career, becoming deputy chancellor after her academic retirement. She was appointed Dame Commander of the Order of the British Empire in 1981 and was inducted posthumously into the Victorian Honour Roll of Women in 2001.

== Early life ==
Margaret Blackwood was born in 1909 in South Yarra, a suburb of Melbourne. Her parents were Robert Leslie Blackwood and Muriel Pearl (née Henry), both teachers, and her older brother was the engineer Sir Robert Blackwood. She attended Melbourne Girls Grammar School and, after qualifying as a teacher, taught at Lowther Hall Anglican Grammar School and Korowa Anglican Girls' School. She enrolled at the University of Melbourne in 1934 and studied part-time, continuing to teach to support herself. She completed a Bachelor of Science in 1938 and a Master of Science in botany in 1939. Her postgraduate research focused on dieback in the pine species Pinus radiata. From 1939 until 1941, she was a research scholar and demonstrator at the university in the field of plant cytology and genetics.

== Military career ==
During the Second World War, Blackwood enrolled in the Women's Auxiliary Australian Air Force (WAAAF) in 1941. She first worked as a drill instructor before working on the creation of a cipher for the Royal Australian Air Force. She was promoted to the rank of Wing Officer in January 1945 and was discharged in January 1946.

== Academic career ==
Blackwood returned to the University of Melbourne upon her discharge from the WAAAF in 1946 as a biology lecturer and dean of women. She was awarded a scholarship to study at the University of Cambridge's Newnham College from 1948 to 1950. There, she studied the genetics of maize with David Catcheside and received a doctorate for her work in 1954. She returned to the University of Melbourne in 1951 as a senior lecturer in botany and received a travelling scholarship to attend the University of Wisconsin in 1958 and a research fellowship at the University of Birmingham in 1959. After being promoted to reader (professor), Blackwood retired from academia in 1974. Following her retirement, she was elected to the university council in 1976 and became its first female deputy chancellor in 1980.

Blackwood was made a Member of the Order of the British Empire (MBE) in 1964 and was appointed Dame Commander of the Order of the British Empire in 1981. She was made a fellow of the Australian and New Zealand Association for the Advancement of Science and the Australian Genetics Society in 1979. She was also a fellow of two of the University of Melbourne's residential colleges, Janet Clarke Hall and Trinity College. She was awarded an honorary Legum Doctor (doctorate in law) by the University of Melbourne in 1983.

== Death and legacy ==
Blackwood died in 1986, three years after retiring as deputy chancellor of the University of Melbourne. In 1989, a new species of the fungi genus Phyllosticta, P. blackwoodiae, was described and named after her. She was inducted into the Victorian Honour Roll of Women in 2001. A collection of her papers is held by the University of Melbourne.
