= Lilian Scantlebury =

Australian Red Cross worker (1894–1964)

- Born: Lilian Avis Whybrow; 12 January 1894; Collingwood, Victoria, Australia
- Died: 12 April 1964 (aged 70); South Melbourne, Victoria, Australia
- Education: University of Melbourne
- Spouse: George Clifford Scantlebury

Lilian Avis Scantlebury OBE born Lilian Avis Whybrow (12 January 1894 – 12 April 1964) was an Australian Red Cross worker. She was one of the designers of what became the Australian Red Cross Society. They wrote letters from the Red Cross to the families of Australian soldiers. She lived at and served the development of Janet Clarke Hall in Melbourne.

== Life ==
Scantlebury was born in 1894 in Collingwood. Her parents were Alice Williamina Hook (born Rostron) and Arthur Whybrow. Her father made boots. She graduated from the University of Melbourne after residing in what was then Trinity College Hostel and is now called Janet Clarke Hall.

During the first world war she went to London. In May 1916, the Australian Wounded and Missing Enquiry Bureau moved its headquarters from Cairo to London, after the Australian Imperial Force's attention was transferred to Europe. Vera Deakin White had started the Bureau in Cairo in 1915. and it had initially gathered information about the fates of soldiers in the Gallipoli campaign for the families of Australian soldiers. Scantlebury joined the bureau in London in 1916 and in time she led the letter section. In the following year there was 60 people working for the bureau and it moved to a larger headquarters. In three years of operation the organisation created 32,000 files for individual soldiers, and issued 400,000 responses. Deakin was made an Officer of the Order of the British Empire (OBE) in the 1918 New Year Honours. Deakin was succeeded as head of the bureau by Scantlebury in 1919.

Supported by her husband she worked to prepare the British Red Cross Australian Branch to deal with emergencies whether of natural or man-made cause. Building on her experience in the first world war the Red Cross again began letter writing. She became the director of the Victoria branch of the society. In 1948 she and Vera White were made commanders in the Order of St John. In the 1959 New Year Honours she was made an OBE.

Scantlebury died in 1964 in South Melbourne. She had served Janet Clarke Hall from 1926 and in 1961 she joined the board after arguing for its existence in the first place as a separate organisation. After her death, a wing of Janet Clarke Hall, was named for her.

== Private life ==
She married a physician (later surgeon) George Clifford Scantlebury in 1920 and they had a daughter.
