= Nina Crone =

Nina Crone OAM (1934 – 2007) was an Australian gardening writer, broadcaster, teacher and school principal.

== Biography ==
Crone was the daughter of James and Grace (née Hall) Crone. She attended Presbyterian Ladies' College in East Melbourne and graduated from the University of Melbourne in 1953 with a bachelor of arts degree. She then taught in Europe and Australia while also studying towards a bachelor of education degree, which she completed in 1962.

From 1965 to 1974 Crone was a radio and TV producer for the ABC Schools Broadcasts; she was also a member of the Victorian State Advisory Committee for School Broadcasts. In 1975 she became headmistress of the Melbourne Girls' Grammar School. She continued with her community involvements, including serving as a council member of the Girl Guides Association of Victoria, a committee member of the United Nations Association of Australia (Victoria) and a committee member for the Australian College of Education (Victoria).

Crone was also a keen gardener, serving as editor of the Australian Garden History Society journal, Australian Garden History. She also wrote articles on plants, gardens and their histories for The Age newspaper under the nom de plume Alison Dalrymple.

She was appointed a Fellow of the Australian College of Education and received a Medal of the Order of Australia in 2000. In 2006 the library at the Girls' Grammar School was redeveloped and renamed the Nina Crone Library.

== Publications ==
- Garden Cuttings — Articles for The Age by Nina Crone (Australian Scholarly Publishing, 2008)
