= Thomas Jollie Smith =

Thomas Jollie Smith (27 March 1858 – 8 September 1927) was a Presbyterian Minister and academic, who was significant in developing language studies and women's education in Australia in the early 20th century.

== Early life and education ==
Thomas Jollie Smith was born in Argyll, Scotland, the family moved to Queensland when Jollie Smith was 5, and then moved to Victoria when he was 10. Educated at Scotch College and the University of Melbourne gaining his BA in 1881 and his MA in 1883 in language and logic. A Presbyterian minister, he trained at Theological Hall, Ormond College in 1887–88.

== Career ==
Jollie Smith started working as a tutor and lecturer at Trinity College, the University of Melbourne in 1880, a role he held for the next decade. He was also the founding principal of the first university residential college in Australia to admit women, Trinity College Hostel (later Janet Clarke Hall) from 1886 to 1890.

From 1890 to 1903, he served a parish at Naracoorte, South Australia, and then minister of Ewing Memorial Church in East Malvern (1905–22).

Alongside his work in East Malvern, Jollie Smith worked as director of studies and lecturer in apologetics at the Deaconess' Training Institute from 1911 to 1921. He pioneered the teaching of Japanese at the University of Melbourne alongside Senkichi 'Moshi' Inagaki in 1919–21. He was impacted by the influenza epidemic of 1920, and he had to convalesce in Queensland for two months.

In 1922, he became chair of Hebrew and Old Testament studies at the Theological Hall, Ormond College until his death in 1927. His library was donated to Ormond after his death.

== Family ==
Jollie Smith's younger brother, Robert Neil Smith, was Professor of Mining Engineering at the University of Tasmania from 1902.

Jollie Smith married Jessie Ochiltree McLennan in 1882, they had one daughter, Christian Jollie Smith who was the second woman to be admitted as a solicitor in New South Wales, and a foundation member of the Communist Party of Australia.

== Published works ==
The Christian faith in its relation to teetotalism, temperance, and total abstinence. (Narracoorte : A. Caldwell, printer, "Herald" Office, 1893.)

How we got our English bible authorised and revised : a lecture delivered under the auspices of the local branch of the British and Foreign Bible Society (Sydney : Christian World Print. and Pub. House, 1896)

On effective voting (Naracoorte, S.A. : [T.J. Smith?], 1896)

The Apocrypha : lecture delivered under the auspices of the Narracoorte Branch of the British and Foreign Bible Society on August 9, 1899 ([Narracoorte, S. Aust.] : [publisher not identified], [1899])

The Hebrew, the Jew and the Christian : an Old Testament study (Melbourne : Arbuckle, Waddell & Fawckner, 1904.)

Thomas Seargent Hall; A M Laughton; T Jollie Smith, Handbook to Victoria : prepared for the members of the British Association for the Advancement of Science, on the occasion of their visit to Victoria, under the direction of the Victorian executive committee (British Association for the Advancement of Science. Melbourne : Govt. Print, 1914)

The value of the Bible (Melbourne : Public Questions Committee 1920)

The criticism of the Old Testament : being the text of the inaugural address (Melbourne : Fitchett Bros., 1923)
