= Enid Joske =

Australian college principal (1890–1973)

- Born: 7 September 1890; Prahran
- Died: 17 October 1973 (aged 83); Harkaway, Victoria
- Education: Melbourne Church of England Girls' Grammar School; University of Melbourne
- Known for: leading Janet Clarke Hall for 25 years
- Predecessor: Margery Herring
- Successor: Mary Bagnall

Enid Joske (7 September 1890 – 17 October 1973) was an Australian college principal. She led Janet Clarke Hall as part of the University of Melbourne for 25 years. Her calm attitude to the hostility of the Warden is thought to have contributed to the college gaining its independence.

== Life ==
Joske was born in the Melbourne suburb of Prahran. Her mother, Louisa (born Isaacs) was born in England. Her father was Dr Alexander Sydney Joske and, in time, he would be the President of the Victorian Medical Board. She was one of their five children.

After attending the Melbourne Church of England Girls' Grammar School she proceeded with a scholarship to stay at the women's hostel attached to Trinity College in 1909. She graduated in 1912 with an honours degree awarded by the University of Melbourne and in the following year she was awarded a teacher's certificate.

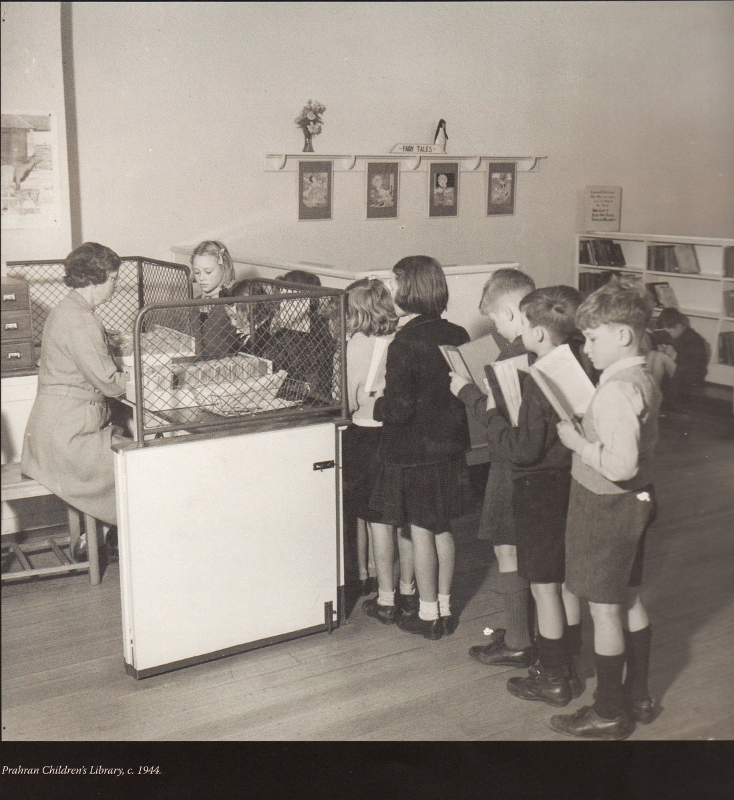
Prahran Children's Library c.1944

In 1919 she and other volunteers were thanked by the Mayor of Prahran for their work in establishing a free children's library by the Town Hall. Joske was singled out for praise as it had been her idea that had been championed. She was given the council's thanks and a travelling bag as she was about to leave for England. She had been involved in choosing the books and in conducting a regular story hour.

In 1927 her old college which was now known as Janet Clarke Hall (JCH) and it was looking for a warden after Margery Herring retired. After the college's first choice was not available they turned to Joske, who they thought would hold the job for a few months. The college had some discipline issues and John Behan who had been the warden of Trinity College, Melbourne for about a decade, had been involved. He was critical towards Joske who was a steady person who failed to rise to his hostility. She had no discipline issues at JCH. Behan gave the impression that the existence of JCH was unrequired and annoying. Joske and JCH enjoyed a level of detachment from the university and Behan's behaviour encouraged the hall to take its own line. The social conventions relaxed during her time as principal and she moved with the times following a line similar to University College, Melbourne.

Joske served until 1952 and in 1956 the college named the Enid Joske wing of the college to record her contribution. In the following year she went abroad for ten months visiting Vassar College in New York, Girton College in Cambridge and St Hugh's in Oxford. Joske died in 1973 in her cottage at Harkaway where she had retired in the city of her birth. Behan's long and determined criticism is now seen as a contributing factor to JCH in time becoming wholly independent.
