= John Behan (educationist) =

Australian educationalist (1881 - 1957)

Sir John Behan
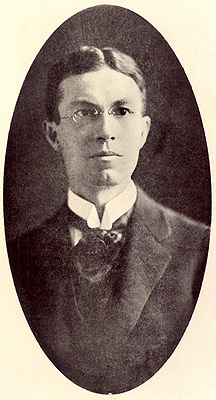
- Behan c.1918
- Born: John Clifford Valentine Behan; 8 May 1881; Footscray, Victoria, Australia
- Died: 30 September 1957 (aged 76); Olinda, Victoria
- Education: Caulfield Grammar School; University High School; University of Melbourne; University of Oxford
- Occupations: Educationist and lawyer
- Known for: First Victorian Rhodes Scholar; Warden of Trinity College, Melbourne

Sir John Clifford Valentine Behan KBE (8 May 1881 – 30 September 1957), the first Rhodes Scholar from the state of Victoria, was an Australian educationalist and lawyer, the second warden of Trinity College at the University of Melbourne, and "beyond the college life [at Trinity,] he was a sound and far-seeing secretary in Australia of the Rhodes Scholarship Trust for 30 years from 1922 to 1952".

== Family ==
The ninth and youngest child, and the fifth son of William Behan (1837–1930) and Phoebe Hannah Behan (née Gundry, 1845–1900) John Clifford Valentine Behan was born at Footscray, Victoria, on 8 May 1881.

On 30 July 1907, Behan married Violet Greta Caldwell (1881–1963).

== Education ==
=== Secondary education ===
Behan was educated at Caulfield Grammar School (1894–1895: he was dux in 1895), and at Thomas Palmer's "University High School" (1896) in Melbourne.

=== Melbourne University ===
Behan attended the University of Melbourne where he studied law and was awarded the Supreme Court Prize for being the top law student in his graduating class. He graduated Bachelor of Laws (LL.B) on 9 April 1904. On 21 April 1923 he was awarded a Doctor of Laws (LL.D) degree by the university. In 1924 a version of his 1922 LL.D. dissertation, "The Use of Land as Affected by Covenants and Obligations not in the form of Covenants", was published.

=== Oxford University ===
Behan studied for both his Bachelor of Arts in jurisprudence and Bachelor of Civil Law degrees at Hertford College at the University of Oxford. He was admitted to the Middle Temple of the Inns of Court and was a fellow of University College at Oxford, lecturing in law. He became dean of the college in 1914.

== Rhodes Scholarship ==
Behan was the first recipient of a Rhodes Scholarship designated for an Australian student. He was selected as the Rhodes Scholar for Victoria in 1904. The selection committee for the Victorian Rhodes scholarship — Sir Reginald Talbot (Governor of Victoria), Sir John Madden (Chief Justice of Victoria), Arthur Sachse (Victorian Minister of Public Instruction), Frank Tate (Victorian Director of Education) and Baldwin Spencer (president of the professorial board of the University of Melbourne) — determined that the closing date for applications would be 23 June 1904.

At the close of applications there were fourteen candidates. Nine of the applicants, those who "were considered to have the best claims", were interviewed, and six of those "were regarded by the committee as fully complying with the requirements as laid down by the late Mr. Cecil Rhodes". Of those six, three (each of whom "had a brilliant record") made the final list: Behan, the future Olympian, and 1905 Rhodes Scholar Harvey Sutton and Behan's cousin, Edward Percival Oldham. After "long consideration" by the committee a ballot was held, and "Mr. Behan was unanimously selected the first Rhodes scholar for Victoria."

In relation to Behan and Rhodes' second selection requirement — namely, "his fondness of and success in manly outdoor sports, such as cricket, football and the like" — the selection committee noted that:

The fact that [Behan] has had to earn his own living has debarred him from taking an active part in competitive athletics; but he laid before the selectors evidence that he has manifested fondness for and entered into manly sports and games.

At its 14 July 1904 meeting, the Trinity College council, having been officially informed of Behan's selection, resolved:

"That the council expresses to Mr Behan its great pleasure at his selection as the first Rhodes scholar for Victoria, and its confidence that his career at Oxford will confer further honour upon Trinity College, and that the council also offer its congratulations to the warden, tutors and students of Trinity upon this notable addition to the list of distinctions won by members of the college." — The Argus, 18 July 1904.

By early July, "there [was] a feeling of dissatisfaction among a section of the students of the University and others interested in the subject regarding the selection of Mr J.C V. Behan for the Rhodes scholarship"; and, on 14 July 1904, a meeting of the University of Melbourne Sports Union unanimously passed a resolution, critical of the 1904 selection of Behan (i.e., of the conduct of the selection process, rather than of Behan himself):

"That in the interests of future candidates for the Rhodes scholarship, this council respectfully expresses its regret that the 1904 selection has been made on principles which make it possible for a person having no interests outside the scholastic and intellectual side of University life to represent the state as the Rhodes scholar." — The Examiner, 18 July 1904.

The same meeting passed a second unanimous resolution recommending that, in relation to the "fondness for and success in manly outdoor sport" requirement, "in the selection of a Rhodes scholar the only admissible evidence of fondness for and success in manly sports should be certificates given by bona-fide athletic committees, clubs, or associations, and stating the actual qualifications and performances of the candidate". A similar resolution, in relation to future selection criteria, was passed by the Victorian Amateur Athletic Association on 20 July 1904, and, on 27 August 1904, following a football match between the Adelaide and Melbourne universities, in his address to the Melbourne team, the captain of the Adelaide University team, the Norwood and SAFL interstate footballer Dean Dawson stated that,

"Speaking as an individual, and not officially, he very much sympathised with the young men of Melbourne in the emphatic protest, they had made respecting the choice of the Victorian Rhodes scholar. When he said that he referred not only to the matter of the protest, but to the manner in which it had been made by men who had been careful not to utter a word of unkindness towards the young man who had been chosen, but only to establish their own position, which seemed to be on a sound basis. All manly sports should be promoted at the universities, if only to give an opportunity to competitors for the Rhodes scholarship to become athletically proficient." — The Advertiser, 29 August 1904.

== Warden of Trinity College, Melbourne ==
Behan was warden of Trinity College, Melbourne, for 28 years, from May 1918—when he succeeded Alexander Leeper, who had been warden for 42 years—until his retirement in May 1946. He was hostile towards Enid Joske who was the Principal of Janet Clarke Hall (JCH). Behan had discipline issues at JCH which Joske never encountered. Behan gave the impression that JCH was unrequired and annoying. His long and determined criticism is now seen as a contributing factor to JCH in time becoming wholly independent.

He had studied at Trinity college on a scholarship during his undergraduate education and was the first alumnus of the college to become its head. He is the second longest-serving warden of Trinity College.

== Knighthood ==
Behan was made a knight bachelor upon his retirement in the 1949 New Year Honours List along with that of Don Bradman. Both his and Bradman's investiture — by William McKell, the Governor-General of Australia — took place at Queen's Hall, Parliament House, Melbourne, on 15 March 1949.

== Death ==
Behan died suddenly, at Olinda, Victoria, on 30 September 1957.

== See also ==
- List of Caulfield Grammar School people
