= Melbourne Girls Grammar =

Location
- South Yarra, Victoria; Australia; 37°49′53″S 144°59′6″E

Information
- Type: Independent, single sex, day & boarding, Christian school.
- Motto: Latin: Nisi Dominus Frustra (Without the Lord, All is in Vain)
- Denomination: Anglican
- Established: 1893
- Founder: Emily Hensley & Alice Taylor
- Chairman: Mark Burgess
- Headmistress: Dr Toni Meath
- Chaplain: Rev. Kirsty Ross
- Years offered: ELC–12
- Gender: Girls
- Enrolment: ~1050 (P–12)
- Colours: Navy blue, grey and white
- Slogan: Courage, Compassion, Integrity and Self-discipline
- Affiliation: Girls Sport Victoria
- Website: www.mggs.vic.edu.au

Melbourne Girls Grammar School (commonly called MGGS and formally known as MCEGGS), is an independent, Anglican, day and boarding school for girls, located in South Yarra, an inner city suburb of Melbourne, Victoria, Australia.

Founded in 1893 by Emily Hensley and Alice Taylor, the school has a non-selective enrolment policy and caters for 1,010 students from Early Learning to Year 12, including 90 boarders. It was originally known as Merton Hall and then as Melbourne Church of England Girls Grammar School.

Melbourne Girls Grammar School is affiliated with the Association of Heads of Independent Schools of Australia, the Junior School Heads Association of Australia, the Alliance of Girls' Schools Australasia, the Association of Independent Schools of Victoria, the Australian Boarding Schools Association, and is a founding member of Girls Sport Victoria.

== History ==
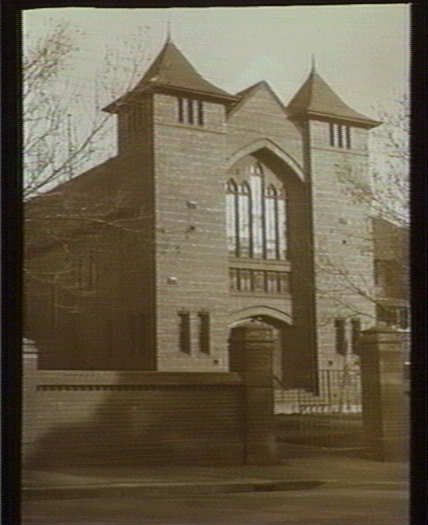
MGGS chapel, 1929

Melbourne Girls Grammar School was founded in 1893, as a private school known as Merton Hall in Domain Road, South Yarra, by Emily Hensley and Alice Taylor. In 1900, the School moved to its current location in Anderson Street, and in 1903 it became the first girls' school to be owned by the Anglican Diocese of Melbourne. Mary and Edith Morris were the headmistresses and in 1911 Mary Valentine Gutteridge led the junior school.

Merton Hall, now the main senior campus, was named after the house in Cambridge, England, where Newnham College began.

The tenth headmistress of Melbourne Girls Grammar, Christine Briggs, announced her retirement in 2007. Catherine Misson was appointed to the position of Principal in 2008 serving until 2019, when Toni Meath, previously principal at Mac.Robertson Girls' High School, was appointed as the twelfth Principal of the Melbourne Girls Grammar.

=== Headmistresses and principals ===
- Emily Hensley 1893–1898 and Alice Taylor 1893–1895
- Mary Morris 1898–1907 and Edith Morris 1898–1912
- Agnes Tunnicliffe 1914–1915
- Kathleen Gilman Jones 1916–1938
- Dorothy Jean Ross 1939–1955
- Edith Mountain 1958–1974
- Nina Crone 1975–1994
- Christine Briggs 1995–2007
- Catherine Misson 2008–2018
- Toni Meath 2019–present

== Campuses ==
The Junior Years (Prep–Year 4) learning environment is located at the Morris Hall campus on Caroline Street, while the Early Learning Centre (3- and 4-Year Old Program), the Middle Years (5-8) and Senior Years (Years 9–12) are all located at the Merton Hall campus, in Anderson Street, South Yarra.

The Merton Hall campus provides a chapel, gymnasium, library, dining hall, specialist Sport, Art, Drama, Music and Science Centres, assembly hall, multipurpose sports fields and a rowing facility located nearby on the banks of the Yarra River. The Boarding House (which caters for approximately 90 students) is also located on the Merton Hall campus.

Wildfell, which was built in 2011 for the Middle Years Program, includes an eLearning studio and learning studios.

Morris Hall, the Junior Years campus, incorporates learning studios, specialist art, music and science centres, an oval and sustainable gardens.

== Buildings and facilities ==
The School opened its Science Futures Centre in 2005, with a ceremony attended by Sir Gustav Nossal. The Science Futures Centre comprises eight laboratories, three preparation rooms, three laboratory technicians' offices and withdrawal areas. This was renamed the Christine Briggs Building in 2007 following the retirement of Principal, Christine Briggs.

The most recent additions to the campus include the Artemis Centre (2017) and the St Hilda’s garden (2021).

A Strategic Planning Framework was commissioned for the Anderson and Caroline Street sites from the architectural firm ARM.

== Academics ==
Melbourne Girls Grammar offers Victorian Certificate of Education (VCE) for its students at Years 11 to 12, with some students beginning their VCE studies in Year 10.

== House system ==
The house system involves many students in a variety of student competitions from sport to art, music, drama, debating and public speaking. The houses run across Morris and Merton Halls and are:

- Blackwood: (Note: Originally Batman, named after John Batman, one of the founders of Melbourne, but renamed in 2022.) yellow, named after alumna Dame Margaret Blackwood
- Clarke: red, named after Archbishop Lowther Clarke, who was a major influence in the early development of girls’ education within the Church of England framework
- Hensley: pink, commemorates one of the two first headmistresses of the school - Emily Hensley
- Mungo: green, named after "St Mungo", the house in Domain Road where the school first opened in 1893
- Taylor: blue, commemorates the other of the first two headmistresses of the school – Alice Taylor

== Sport ==
Melbourne Girls Grammar is a member of Girls Sport Victoria.

== Notable alumnae ==
Education

- Enid Joske (1890–1973) was Principal of Janet Clarke Hall in Melbourne
- Margaret Loch Kiddle (1933) – Historian
- Sally Walker AM (1972) – Vice Chancellor of Deakin University

Community and philanthropy

- Gladys Buntine OBE (Spurling 1918) – Girl Guides Commissioner
- Vera Deakin White OBE (1909) – Red Cross worker

Entertainment, media, and the arts

- Beryl Bryant (1909) – Theatre owner and actress
- Caroline Craig (1992) – Actress
- Caroline Wilson (1977) – AFL journalist and television presenter
- Fay Zwicky (1950) – Poet
- Helen Gifford OAM (1952) – Composer
- Jill Garner (1977) – Victorian Government Architect
- Kate Alexa (2005) – Singer
- Stephanie McIntosh (2003) – Singer and actress
- Portia de Rossi

Medicine and science

- (George) Girlie Chapple Hodges MBBS MS (1904–1999) – A surgeon, who was the first woman to complete Master of Surgery in Victoria. She was also a field hockey player who represented Australia.
- Lucy Meredith Bryce CBE (1914) – Haematologist
- Mary Ellinor Lucy Archer MBE (1912) – Librarian and scientist
- Margaret Blackwood (1927) MBE, DBE – Botanist
- Nancy Millis MBE, AC (1939) – Microbiologist
- June Howqua MBBS, MD – Cardiologist

Olympians and Paralympians

- Amber Parkinson (1993) – Beijing 2008 – Fencing
- Angela Darby (2004) – Beijing 2008 – Modern Pentathlon – Rhodes Scholar 2012
- Danni Roche OAM (1987) – Atlanta 1996 – Hockey
- Isis Holt (2019) – 2016 Paralympics and 2020 Paralympics – Athletics
- Jacqui Marshall (1974) – Los Angeles 1984 – Rowing
- Joscelin Yeo Wei Ling (1997) – Barcelona 1992, Atlanta 1996, Sydney 2000 and Athens 2004 – Swimming
- Kitty Chiller AM (1981) – Sydney 2000 – Modern Pentathlon and later Olympic Chef de Mission in 2016 – first female Australian to hold the role
- Sarah D'Arcy (1993) – Sydney 2000 – Swimming
- Sarah Hammond (1993) – Sydney 2000 – Handball
- Sarah Sauvey (2001) – Vancouver 2010 Winter Olympics – Ski Cross

Sports

- Phoebe McWilliams (2003) – AFLW – Carlton Football Club – Geelong Football Club – Greater Western Sydney
- Bonnie Toogood (2015) – AFLW – Western Bulldogs – Essendon
- Olivia Vesely (2017) – AFLW – St Kilda Football Club
- Abbie McKay (2018) – AFLW – Carlton Football Club
- Eliza McNamara (2020) – AFLW – Melbourne Football Club

== Associated schools ==
Melbourne Girls Grammar School is the sister school of Melbourne Grammar School, with which it has a strong association, as the two stream productions, formals, workshops and concerts together. The student bases also enjoy a strong association throughout the secondary years as many MGGS girls attend Grimwade House (Melbourne Grammar School's co-educational primary campus).

== See also ==
- Anglican Church of Australia
