= June Howqua =

Australian medical doctor and cardiologist (1821–2009)

- Born: June 4, 1921
- Died: June 8, 2009 (aged 88)
- Education: Melbourne Girls Grammar
- Alma mater: University of Melbourne
- Occupation: medical doctor

June Louise Howqua (4 June 1921 – 8 June 2009) was an Australian medical doctor who specialised in cardiology and thoracic medicine.

== Life and career ==
Howqua was born in 1921 in Melbourne to Albert Henry Howqua, a financial adviser to the government, and Lillie Eileen (née Currie). Her great-grandfather was Ah Kin How Qua, an interpreter for the Australian government. She attended Melbourne Girls Grammar before studying medicine at the University of Melbourne. After graduating in 1944, she began her career at the Royal Melbourne Hospital. In the 1950s, she took a job as a ship doctor as a means to travel to London, where she took up a position at the Brompton Hospital for Diseases of the Chest. She returned to Melbourne in the early 1960s and began working at the Queen Victoria Hospital, a women's hospital where she would eventually establish a specialised coronary care unit.

Howqua worked at the Queen Victoria Hospital for three decades and served as vice president of the hospital's board from 1979 to 1983. She retired from the hospital in 1989, continuing to operate a private practice until 1996. In her retirement, she continued to live in the refurbished boarding house where she ran her practice.
