= Jill Garner =

Australian architect

Jill Garner AM
- Education: RMIT University
- Occupation: Architect
- Spouse: Lindsay Davis
- Website: www.garnerdavis.com.au

Jillian Meredith Garner AM is an Australian architect. She is a principal of Garner Davis Architects and in 2015 became the Victorian Government Architect.

She co-founded Garner Davis Architects in 1990 and holds the role of Principal. She joined the Office of the Victorian Government Architect as Associate Government Architect in 2010, before becoming Government Architect in 2015. She is one of the first graduates of Master of Design program offered at RMIT University, and her firm received early recognition through winning an international design competition in 1994.

== Early life and education ==
Garner first developed an interest in architecture visiting a friend's house designed by Robin Boyd and took interest in its layout and was fascinated by the unique quality of light, space and response to site.

She was educated in Melbourne Girls Grammar School and later enrolled in RMIT University's Bachelor of Architecture program, during which she met Lindsay Davis. She later pursued a Master of Architecture at RMIT University.

== Architectural work ==
=== Wagga Wagga Civic Centre ===
The Wagga Wagga Civic Centre project emerged the winner in an open two-stage architectural competition held by the Wagga Wagga City Council. Garner Davis' proposal was awarded the commission for the centre. It was shortlisted (top 5) from 132 entries.

The building has four distinct facades with contrasting materials creating varying degrees of opacity. A play on surfaces is also used within the internal 'street', creating an illusion of ample space. The Civic Centre integrates culture and acts as an administrative facility of the city.

In 1997, Sydney architect Stephen Varady organised an architectural competition in the city of Wagga Wagga to build a $12 million Civic Centre. Melbourne architects Jill Garner and Lindsay Davis eventually won the commission. The centre includes council chambers, offices, a library, art and craft galleries, public service centres and leasable areas. The Wagga Wagga Civic Theatre (circa 1960) and the city's original council chamber were retained on opposite corners of the site. The main building can be accessed from the eastern and western plazas.

The building contains multiple entrances. The Baylis Street entrance, provides access to the council facilities, customer service centre, library and art gallery off a skylit internal promenade called the Civic Arcade. The pathway continues towards a café, and culminates in the National Art Glass Gallery. This pavilion is positioned like a raft over the original riverbed where the lagoon once flowed to the Murrumbidgee River, accommodating an intimate sculpture garden, which highlights the lines of the Civic Theatre.

=== Wodonga TAFE ===
The Wodonga TAFE building designed by Garner Davis Architects, consists of a library, art gallery, theatre and senior citizens' club. It is located in the city's cultural precinct.

One of the architects' main concerns was the environment surrounding the new building, adjacent to a courtyard where the entrances to the cultural buildings lie. The entrance, constructed from concrete, steel and timber battens, seems to peel away from the corner.

The western façade consists of extended embossed concrete panelled walls and timber battens for sun protection and is contrasted by generous glazing. The embossed concrete creates texture and depicts an abstracted aerial view of the Murray River system.

Beyond the glazed entry lies the reception area with a lime green laminate counter and a bench in the lobby, designed for students to use their laptops. A compelling feature of the atrium of the two-level building is the staircase, made from steel and glass. This temperature of this area is kept cool by louvred glass windows and skylight. Additionally, hot air purged through the louvres. The ground level has four lecture rooms, complete with state-of-the-art technology. Retractable walls ensure each space can be enclosed or left open, creating continuous spaces. And each room has a kitchenette and storage areas made from dark timber veneer.

The administrative offices and a large boardroom which leads to an enclosed terrace can be found on the first floor of the Wodonga TAFE building, with timber batten walls to diffuse light.

Time constraints were a challenging aspect of the project. The architects were given a year to design, document and construct this building.

== Teaching ==
Garner has taught architectural history, contemporary theory and design at RMIT University and the University of Melbourne. She is frequently invited to architectural events and has contributed to the industry through publications and journals, seminars, and lectures. She has also been on award juries and is a member of the Association of Consulting Architects Australia (ACA).

== Early career ==
Jill Garner worked in several of Melbourne's influential design practices over 10 years post-undergraduate graduation. This led to the birth of Garner Davis Architects. She was later invited to join the Office of the Victorian Government Architect(OVGA) in 2010 as an Associate Architect and became Victorian Government Architect in 2015.

== Own architectural firm ==
The St Kilda-based Garner Davis Architects was founded in 1990 by Jill Garner and her partner, Lindsay Davis. The firm's design philosophy is based on an inseparable nature of aesthetics, craft, form, space, narrative and the practicalities of occupation and operation.

The practice's projects include the Northcote Precinct Masterplan and the Mornington Peninsula Customer Service Centre and the Mornington Library in 2001. The Masterplan won the 2004 Built Environment award for both Outer Melbourne and Regional Architecture. Some of Garner's interior works includes Ivanhoe House, a private residence situated by the Yarra River and Talacko House, in Metung, Victoria completed in 1990.

According to Jill Garner, "The true value of (good) architecture lies in its capacity to integrate a solution to the mundane problems of occupation, with the capacity to change our perception of place, and the very best architecture integrates use with space, material and light in such a way that our senses soar".

== Awards and international recognition ==
The Wagga Wagga Civic Centre design proposal won an international design competition for new council offices, library, art galleries and cafe in 1994 and was completed in 1998.

In 2021 Garner was appointed a Member of the Order of Australia for "significant service to architecture, to professional associations, and to education".
