= Diane Lemaire =

Australian aeronautical engineer

- Born: 2 February 1923
- Died: 27 October 2012 (aged 89)
- Occupation: aeronautical engineer

Diane Adrienne Lemaire (2 February 1923 – 27 October 2012) was an Australian aeronautical engineer. She was the first woman to graduate from the University of Melbourne with a degree in engineering.

== Early life and education ==
Diane Adrienne Lemaire born in 1923, the daughter of Katie (née Bradridge Phillips) (1893-1956) and Lionel Henry Lemaire. She had two brothers, Peter and James. Lemaire attended St Catherine's School in Toorak, Melbourne, Australia, graduating in 1939.

She attended the University of Melbourne and was a resident at Janet Clarke Hall. In 1944, she was the first woman to graduate with a Bachelor of Mechanical Engineering from the University of Melbourne. She later attended Cornell University and graduated with a Master of Science. Her thesis title was On the Question of the Existence of a Homogeneous Solution to the Equation for the Flow over the Shrough of a Ducted Propeller.

== Career ==
Lemaire worked as a Technical Officer at the CSIR Division of Aeronautics (later the Aeronautical Research Laboratories). After World War II, she worked at the National Physical Laboratory in England, them, following her Masters at Cornell, returned to the Aeronautical Research Laboratories, where she worked until her retirement in 1986.

Following her retirement, Lemaire concentrated on breeding Lhasa Apso dogs.

== Honours and legacy ==
Lemaire was awarded the Amelia Earhart Fellowship from Zonta International in 1962.

She died on 27 October 2012, aged 89.

In her will, dated 18 August 2010, Lemaire left a bequest of one fifth of her residuary estate to the Faculty of Engineering at the University of Melbourne, to support research in the field of fluid dynamics. The Melbourne School of Engineering established the Diane Lemaire Scholarship for female PhD students who have completed the equivalent of at least six months candidature and is awarded on the basis of academic merit, the quality of their research, the strength of a personal statement and their resume, including any publications.
