= Mary Valentine Gutteridge =

Australian educationalist, kindergarten principal (1887–1962)

- Born: February 14, 1887; Launceston
- Died: June 15, 1962 (aged 75); Wavell Heights
- Education: Froebel Institute, Roehampton
- Occupation: educationalist
- Known for: "the founder in Australia of the nursery school system"

Mary Valentine Gutteridge (February 14, 1887 – June 15, 1962) was an Australian educationalist and kindergarten principal. She is creditted as "the founder in Australia of the nursery school system".

== Life ==
Gutteridge was born in 1887 in Tasmania at Launceston. She was the first of five children born to Mary Kate (born Penney) and her husband Matthew Wilkins Gutteridge. After her four brothers were born, the family moved, so that her father could practice at Melbourne's Homoeopathic Hospital. Her brothers were to be doctors and engineers. She showed a talents for languages and after school in Melbourne she went to the UK when she was eighteen to study childhood education at the Froebel Institute.

In 1911 she was back in Melbourne where she led the junior section of the Girls Grammar School where Edith Morris was the headmistress.

After the war she spent two years in Paris where she took lectures at the Sorbonne and the Louvre and she established a nursery school with the help of the Rothschild Foundation. In February 1922 she returned from France to become the director of a kindergarten in Melbourne run by the Free Kindergarten Union (FKU) in Victoria. When she arrived she found that the FKU and the director of the Kindergarten Training College, Jessie Glendinning, had disagreed and she was on sick leave. So instead of giving lectures at the college she became its director and she had to oversee 25 kindergartens.

Between 1928 and 1930 she exploited the opportunity offered by a Laura Spelman Rockefeller memorial fellowship to travel the widely to discover best practise in the education of young children and, in particular, emerginging American ideas about child development. In 1930 she gave a series of five lectures on "Child Management" organised by the Victorian Council for Mental Hygiene.

In 1937 she published Concentration in Young Children and in the following year she is recorded with a similarly titled book The Duration of Attention in Young Children. In 1941 she joined the Merrill Palmer School in Detroit. In 1939 Columbia University received her ...Study of Motor Achievements of Young Children.

== Death and legacy ==
In 1950 the Mary Gutteridge Lectures began, organised by the Kindergarten Training College Graduates Association. Gutteridge is creditted as "the founder in Australia of the nursery school system". She retired to Brisbane in 1952, but she continued to take an interest in the subject. She died in Wavell Heights in 1962.
