= Kathleen Gilman Jones =

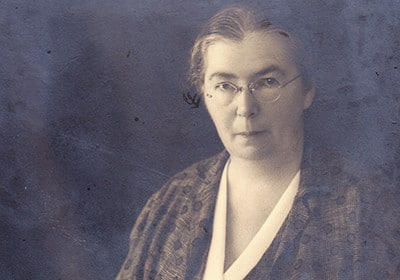
- Born: Kathleen Annie Gilman Jones; 30 September 1880; Fazeley, England
- Died: 16 September 1942 (aged 61); Royal Tunbridge Wells, England
- Education: Newnham College in Cambridge
- Occupation: headteacher
- Known for: head of Melbourne Church of England Girls' Grammar School
- Predecessor: Agnes Tunnicliffe
- Successor: Dorothy Ross

Kathleen Annie Gilman Jones (30 September 1880 – 16 September 1942) was a British educationist. She was the headmistress of Melbourne Church of England Girls' Grammar School from 1916 to 1939.

== Life ==
Jones was born in the Staffordshire village of Fazeley. Her parents were Harriett (born Gilman) and her husband Charles Jones. She attended the now closed Hiatt Ladies' College in Shropshire and that enabled her to gain entry to Newnham College in Cambridge where she studied maths. She graduated in 1903 and then qualified as a teacher. She taught in the West Midlands before leaving for South Africa where she became a vice-Principal of the Queenstown High School for Girls in the Eastern Cape.

From South Africa she went to Sydney, Australia in 1914 where she became the joint headmistress of Ascham School, in the suburb of Edgecliff. Two years later, she became Melbourne Church of England Girls' Grammar School's headteacher when the school had 280 students.

At the school she took an independent line on teaching. She did not require women teachers to be single and her school was cited as an example of equitable salaries by women teachers demanding equal treatment.

Aileen Dent's portrait of Miss Gilman-Jones was a finalist for the 1928 Archibald Prize. The painting is at the school.

In 1938/9, she was not well and she retired from teaching and she was replaced by Dorothy Ross who was critical of the state of the school. She replaced some of the staff with new teachers.

Jones died in hospital in Royal Tunbridge Wells in 1942.
