= Janet Clarke Hall, Melbourne =

Residential college of the University of Melbourne, Australia

Janet Clarke Hall
- University of Melbourne
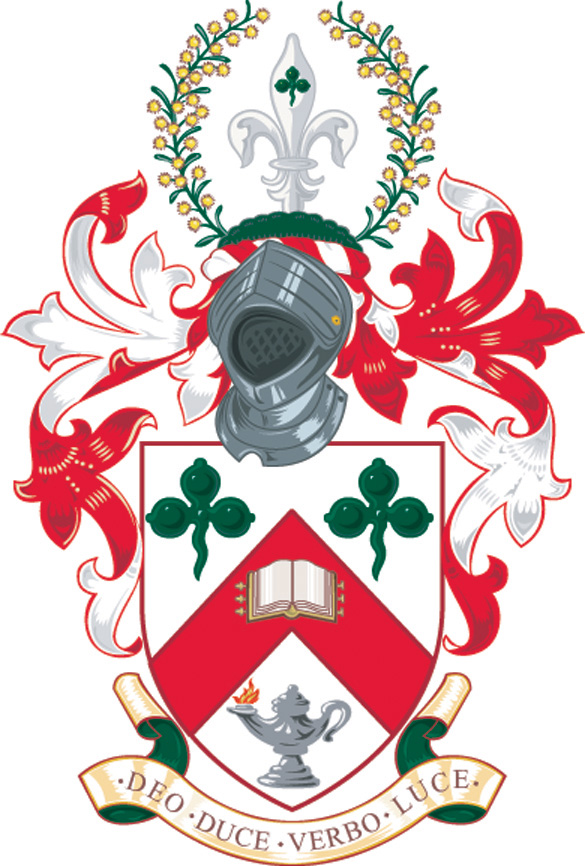
- Crest
- Location: Royal Parade, Parkville, Victoria
- Coordinates: 37.7948°S 144.9589°E
- Full name: Janet Clarke Hall The University of Melbourne
- Motto: Deo Duce, Verbo Luce (Latin)
- Motto in English: "God as Guide, the Word as Light"
- Established: 1886; 140 years ago
- Named for: Janet Clarke
- Former names: Trinity Women's Hostel
- Sister college: Trinity College
- Undergraduates: 90
- Postgraduates: 6
- Newspaper: Luce, TigerLilyRag
- Website: jch.unimelb.edu.au

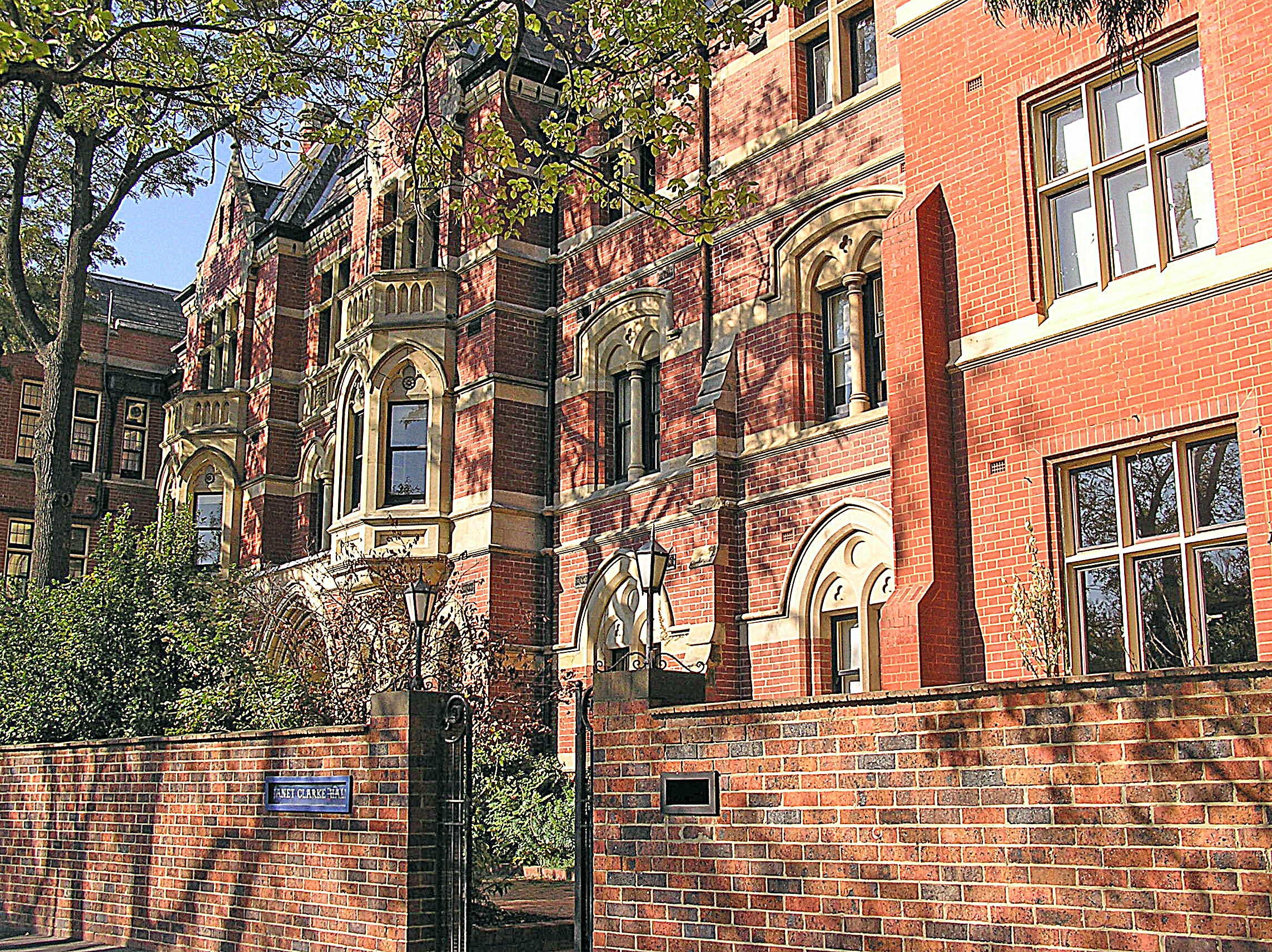
Janet Clarke Hall from Royal Parade

Janet Clarke Hall (JCH) is a residential college of the University of Melbourne in Australia. The college is associated with the Anglican Province of Victoria. Founded in 1886 as the Trinity College Women's Hostel, Janet Clarke Hall was the first university college in Australia for women. One of the smaller colleges, JCH is a residence where students live, learn, and grow alongside academics, researchers, and practitioners, developing not only discipline-specific knowledge and skills but the broad intellectual curiosity which will help them become the thought leaders and changemakers of the future.

== History ==
Established in 1886 as a residential hostel for women students of Trinity College, JCH was originally called the 'Trinity College Hostel'. It was re-named after a significant benefactor, Janet Clarke, wife of Sir William Clarke in 1921. Enid Joske was principal of JCH from 1928 until 1952. Dr Eva Eden was principal from 1964 until 1983. JCH became an independent college in 1961 and co-educational in 1973.

=== Principals of Janet Clarke Hall ===
- The Rev’d Thomas Jollie Smith (1886–87)
- Lucy Waltham (1888)
- Emily Eddes (1889)
- Emily Hensley (1890)
- J.T. Collins (1892-1900)
- Lucy Bateman (1901–05)
- Lucy Archer (1906–18)
- Margery Herring (1919–27)
- Enid Joske (1928–51)
- Mary Bagnall (1952–57)
- Margaret Dewey (1959–62)
- Eva Eden (1964–83)
- Phyllis Fry (1984–95)
- Gail Tulloch (1996–2000)
- Damian Powell (2001–2021)
- Eleanor Spencer-Regan (2022 - present)

== People associated with the college ==
=== College visitor ===
The current college visitor is Peter C. Doherty, winner of a Nobel Prize and Australian of the Year in 1997.

=== Notable alumni ===
- Elizabeth Blackburn, Morris Herzstein Professor of Biology and Physiology at the University of California, San Francisco, winner of the Nobel Prize in Medicine in 2009
- Marita Cheng, Young Australian of the Year
- Adrienne Clarke, former Lieutenant Governor of Victoria and chancellor of La Trobe University
- Helen Garner, writer
- Dorothy Knox, (1902-1983) headteacher, college founder
- Dame Leonie Kramer, former chancellor of the University of Sydney
- Diane Lemaire, aeronautical engineer, first woman to graduate from the University of Melbourne with a degree in engineering
- Fay Marles, Victorian Commissioner of Equal Opportunity from 1977 to 1987 and chancellor of the University of Melbourne from 2001 to 2004
- Lorna Verdun Sisely OBE (1916–2004), surgeon, and founder of the Monash Medical Centre Breast Clinic.
- Gillian Triggs, former president of the Australian Human Rights Commission
- Sally Walker, former vice-chancellor of Deakin University

=== Tutors ===
Former tutors include:

- Manning Clark, historian
- Marilyn Warren, Chief Justice of the Supreme Court of Victoria
