= British pavilion =

Venice Biennale national pavilion

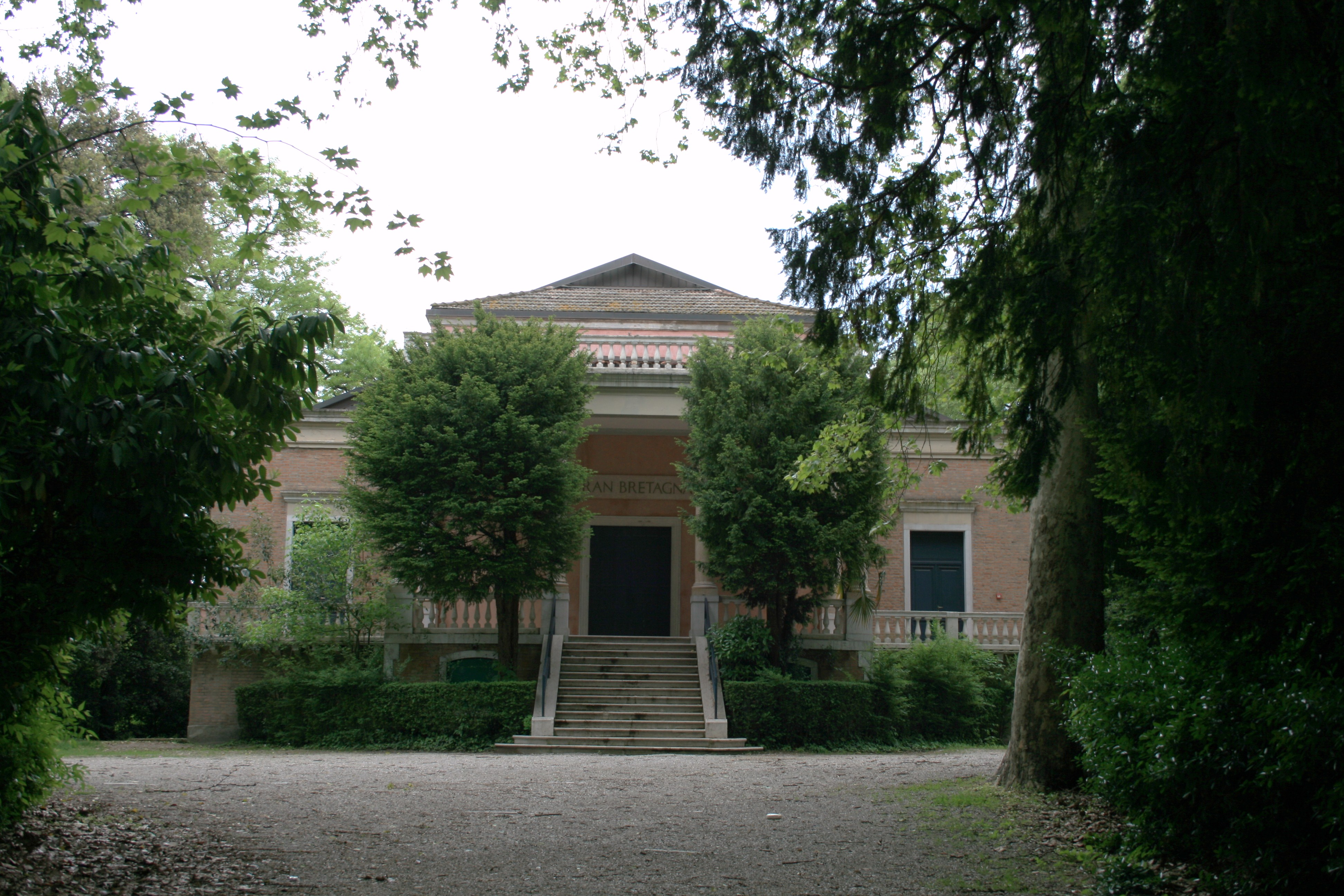
The British pavilion

The British pavilion houses Great Britain's national representation during the Venice Biennale arts festivals.

== Background ==
The Venice Biennale is an international art biennial exhibition held in Venice, Italy. Often described as "the Olympics of the art world", participation in the Biennale is a prestigious event for contemporary artists. The festival has become a constellation of shows: a central exhibition curated by that year's artistic director, national pavilions hosted by individual nations, and independent exhibitions held throughout Venice. The Biennale's parent organisation also runs regular festivals in other arts: architecture, dance, film, music and theatre.

Outside the central international exhibition, individual nations produce their own shows, known as pavilions, as their national representation. Nations that own their pavilion buildings – such as the 30 housed in the Giardini – are responsible for their own upkeep and construction costs as well. Nations without dedicated buildings create pavilions in venues throughout the city.

== Organization and building ==
The British Pavilion was designed by the architect Edwin Alfred Rickards and constructed in 1909 on the site of an earlier building, a café‑restaurant that had been built in 1887. Its design evokes the style of eighteenth‑century Italianate English country houses.

Since 1937, the British Council has been responsible for the pavilion. Funding for the pavilion comes from a mixture of public money, channelled through the British Council, and private sponsorship, including support from Burberry. The decision by the art fair and magazine brand Frieze to sponsor the British Pavilion in 2024 represented the first occasion on which an art fair has provided financial backing for a national pavilion at the Biennale.

== Representation by year ==
=== Art ===
- 1948 – Sculptures by Henry Moore. Paintings by J. M. W. Turner. Works by Ben Nicholson and John Tunnard.
- 1950 – Paintings by Matthew Smith and John Constable. Sculptures by Barbara Hepworth.
- 1952 – Paintings by Graham Sutherland and Edward Wadsworth. Sculptures by the New Aspects of British Sculpture group (Robert Adams, Kenneth Armitage, Reg Butler, Lynn Chadwick, Geoffrey Clarke, Bernard Meadows, Henry Moore, Eduardo Paolozzi, and William Turnbull).
- 1954 – Paintings by Francis Bacon, Lucian Freud, and Ben Nicholson. Sculptures by Reg Butler relating to his Unknown Political Prisoner monument. Lithographs by Allin Braund, Geoffrey Clarke, Henry Cliffe, Robert Colquhoun, William Gear, Henry Moore, Eduardo Paolozzi, Ceri Richards, William Scott, and Graham Sutherland.
- 1956 – Paintings by Ivon Hitchens, John Bratby, Derrick Greaves, Edward Middleditch, and Jack Smith. Sculptures by Lynn Chadwick.
- 1958 – Paintings by William Scott and S. W. Hayter. Sculptures by Kenneth Armitage, Sezione Giovani, Sandra Blow, Anthony Caro, and Alan Davie.
- 1960 – Mixed media works by Victor Pasmore. Paintings by Merlyn Evans, Geoffrey Clarke, Henry Cliffe.
- 1962 – Paintings by Ceri Richards. Sculptures by Robert Adams and Hubert Dalwood.
- 1964 – Mixed media works by Joe Tilson. Paintings by Roger Hilton, Gwyther Irwin. Sculptures by Bernard Meadows.
- 1966 – Paintings by Richard Smith, Bernard Cohen, Harold Cohen, and Robyn Denny. Sculptures by Anthony Caro.
- 1968 – Paintings by Bridget Riley and Francis Bacon. Sculptures by Philip King. 'Ways of Contemporary Research' exhibition with works by Anthony Caro, David Hockney, Ben Nicholson, Eduardo Paolozzi, Victor Pasmore, Graham Sutherland.
- 1970 – Paintings by Richard Smith.
- 1972 – Paintings by John Walker. Sculptures by William G. Tucker. 'Grafica sperimentale per la stampa' exhibition with works by Pentagram (Alan Fletcher, Colin Forbes, Mervyn Kurlansky), Michael English, John Gorham, F. H. K. Henrion, Lou Klein, Enzo Ragazzini. 'Il Libro come luogo di ricerca' exhibition with works by Gilbert and George and Victor Burgin.
- 1976 – Works by Richard Long, Richard Hamilton, Victor Pasmore, David Mackay, Alison and Peter Smithson, James Stirling, John Davies, Phillip Hyde, Anne Rawcliffe-King, Yolanda Teuten.
- 1978 – Photography by Mark Boyle. 'Six Stations for Art-Nature. The Nature of Art' exhibition with works by Gilbert and George, Francis Bacon, David Hockney, Richard Long, and Malcolm Morley. 'Art and Cinema' by Anthony McCall.
- 1980 – Works by Tim Head and Nicholas Pope. 'Art in the Seventies' exhibition with works by Bruce McLean, Kenneth Martin, Television Exhibitions, Barry Flanagan, Gilbert and George, Hamish Fulton, and Richard Long. 'Art in the Seventies. Open 80' exhibition with works by Roger Ackling, Tony Cragg, and Leonard McComb.
- 1982 – Works by Barry Flanagan. 'Aperto 82' exhibition with works by Catherine Blacker, Stephen Cox, Antony Gormley, Tim Head, Shirazeh Houshiary, Anish Kapoor, Christopher Le Brun, Judy Pfaff, Stephen Willats, and Bill Woodrow. 'Arte come arte: persistenza dell'opera – Mostra internazionale' exhibition with works by Frank Auerbach, Lucian Freud, Ronald Kitaj, and Raymond Mason.
- 1984 – Works by Howard Hodgkin. 'Arte allo Specchio' exhibition with works by Peter Greenaway and Christopher Le Brun. 'Arte, Ambiente, Scena' exhibition with works by Judy Pfaff. 'Aperto 84' exhibition with works by Terry Atkinson, Helen Chadwick, Rose Garrard, Glenys Johnson, Paul Richards, Amikam Toren, and Kerry Treng.
- 1986 – Works by Frank Auerbach (Commissioner: Henry Meyric Hughes). 'Aperto 86' exhibition with works by Lisa Milroy, John Murphy, Avis Newman, Jacqueline Poncelet, Boyd Webb, and Richard Wilson. 'Art e Scienza' exhibition with works by Eric Bainbridge, Alastair Brotchie, Anthony Caro, Leonora Carrington, Ithell Colquhoun, Stephen Cox, Tony Cragg, Neil Cummings, Brian Eno, Barry Flanagan, Jeremy Gardiner, Eric Gidney, Jocelyn Godwin, Anthony Gormley, Paul Hayward, Allen Jones, Liliane Lijn, Peter Lowe, Kyeran Lyons, Conroy Maddox, Thomas Major, Kenneth Martin, Mary Martin, Alastair Morton, Hugh O'Donnell, Andrew Owens, Digital Pictures, Mike Punt, Bridget Riley, Kurt Schwitters, Peter Sedgley, Jeffrey Steele, Paul Thomas, Philip West, and Alison Wilding.
- 1988 – Tony Cragg (Commissioner: Henry Meyric Hughes). 'Aperto 88' exhibition with works by Tony Bevan, Hannah Collins, Grenville Davey, Andy Goldsworthy, Simon Linke, Peter Nadin, and Thoms William Puckey. 'Scultori ai Giardini' exhibition with works by Lynn Chadwick, Anthony Core, Philip King, and Joe Tilson.
- 1990 – Anish Kapoor (Commissioner: Henry Meyric Hughes). 'Three Scottish Sculptors' exhibition with works by David Mach, Arthur Watson, and Kate Whiteford. 'Aperto 90' with works by Eric Bainbridge, David Leapman, Patrick Joseph McBride, Therese Oulton, Fiona Rae, and Anthony Wilson. 'Fluxus' exhibition with works by Braco Dimitrijevic, Brion Gysin, Dick Higgins, and Robin Page.
- 1993 – Richard Hamilton (Commissioner: Andrea Rose). 'Aperto 93' exhibition with works by Henry Bond, Christine Borland, Angela Bulloch, Mat Collishaw, Damien Hirst, Simon Patterson, Vong Phaophanit, Steven Pippin, Julie Roberts, and Georgina Starr. 'Punti dell'arte' exhibition with works by Anish Kapoor. 'Slittamenti' exhibition with works by Peter Greenaway and Derek Jarman. 'Macchine della pace' exhibition with works by Tony Cragg, Shirazeh Houshiary, and Julian Opie. 'La coesistenza dell'arte' exhibition with works by Braco Dimitrijevic. 'Art against Aids. Venezia 93' exhibition with works by Gilbert and George, Frank Auerbach, Tony Cragg, Richard Deacon, Shirazeh Houshiary, Anish Kapoor, Ronald Kitaj, Malcolm Morley, Ray Smith, and Rachel Whiteread. 'Tresors de Voyage' exhibition with works by Braco Dimitrijevic, Shirazeh Houshiary, and Anish Kapoor.
- 1995 – Works by Leon Kossoff. 'General Release: Young British Artists' exhibition with works by Fiona Banner, Dinos Chapman, Jake Chapman, Adam Chodzko, Matthew Dalziel, and Louise Scullion, Cerith Wyn Evans, Elizabeth Wright, Tacita Dean, Lucy Gunning, Sam Taylor-Wood, Jane and Louise Wilson, Jaki Irvine, Gary Hume, Douglas Gordan, Tom Gidley, and Ceal Floyer.
- 1997 – Rachel Whiteread (Commissioner: Andrea Rose)
- 1999 – Paintings by Gary Hume (Commissioner: Andrea Rose)
- 2001 – Mark Wallinger (Commissioner: Andrea Rose; curator: Ann Gallagher)
- 2003 – Chris Ofili (Commissioner: Andrea Rose; curator: Colin Ledwith)
- 2005 – Gilbert and George (Commissioner: Andrea Rose; curator: Richard Riley)
- 2007 – Tracey Emin (Commissioner: Andrea Rose)
- 2009 – Video installation by Steve McQueen
- 2011 – Mike Nelson (Commissioner: Andrea Rose; curator: Richard Riley)
- 2013 – Jeremy Deller (Curator: Emma Gifford-Mead)
- 2015 – Sarah Lucas (Curator: Richard Riley)
- 2017 – Phyllida Barlow
- 2019 – Cathy Wilkes (Curator: Zoé Whitley)
- 2022 – Sonia Boyce
- 2024 – John Akomfrah (Curator: Tarini Malik)
- 2026 – Lubaina Himid (Curator: Ese Onojeruo)

== Bibliography ==
- Russeth, Andrew (April 17, 2019). "The Venice Biennale: Everything You Could Ever Want to Know". ARTnews.
- Volpi, Cristiana (2013). "Great Britain". In Re Rebaudengo, Adele (ed.). Pavilions and Garden of Venice Biennale. Rome: Contrasto. p. 167. ISBN 978-88-6965-440-4.
