= Kate MacGarry =

Art gallery in London

Coordinates: 51.5345°N 0.0564°W

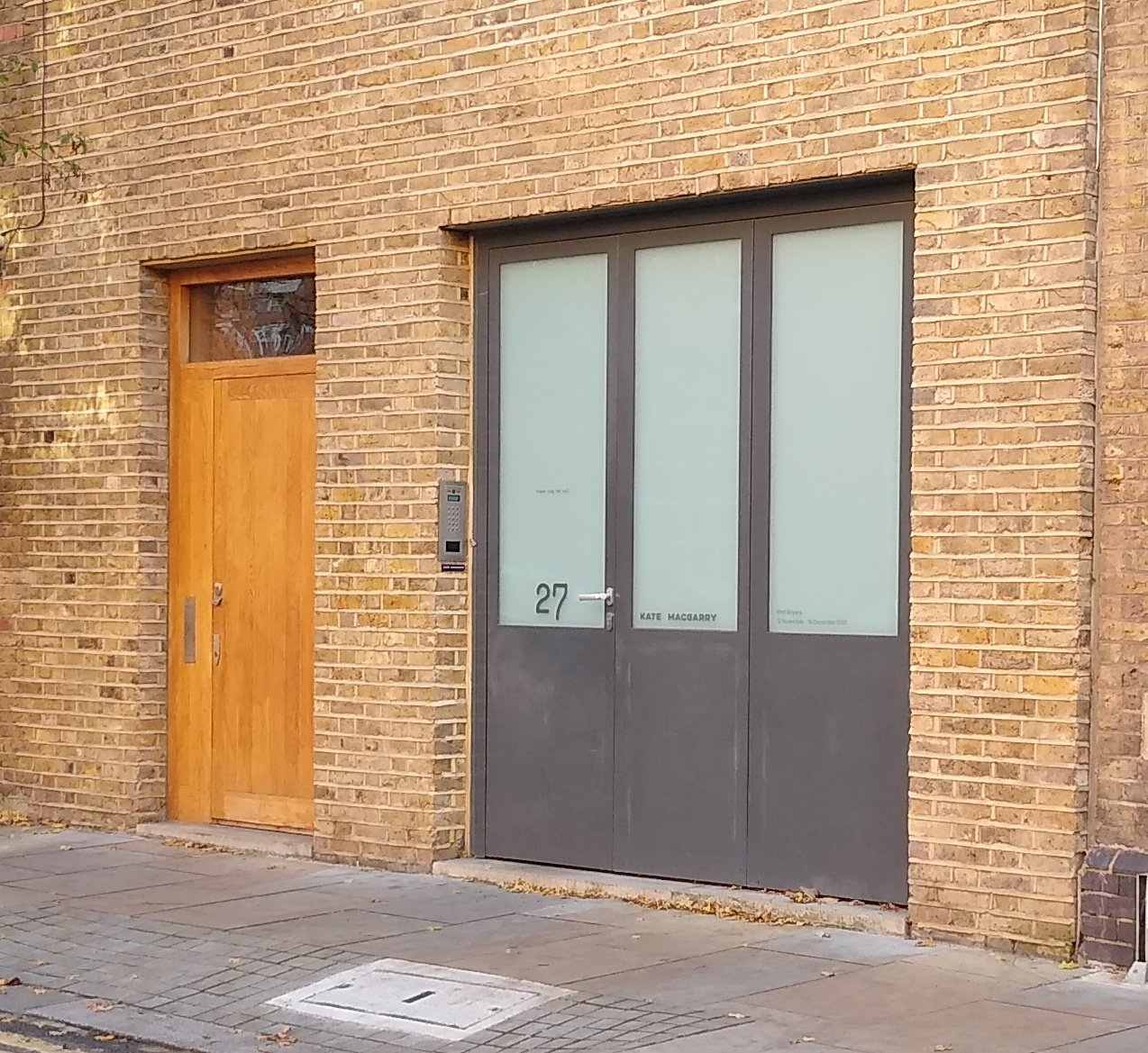
Kate MacGarry

Kate MacGarry is an eponymous contemporary art gallery located in London. It first opened in November 2002 on Redchurch Street in London's East End. From April 2007 to April 2011 the gallery was located on Vyner Street, and in May 2011 the gallery moved back to its roots on Old Nichol Street, close to Redchurch Street in Shoreditch.

The gallery represents several international artists including Matt Bryans, Marcus Coates, Iain Forsyth and Jane Pollard, Samson Kambalu, Dr Lakra, 2008 John Moores 25 Contemporary Painting Prize winner Peter McDonald, Goshka Macuga, Ben Rivers Francis Upritchard, and 2019 Turner prize nominee Helen Cammock. Kambalu and Upritchard were named among the 50 most exciting artists in Europe in 2016. The gallery's booth, which showcased Goshka Macuga's Preparatory Notes for a Chicago Comedy was named one of the top ten at Frieze Art Fair 2014.

In 2020, the gallery was one of the founding members of the Gallery Climate Coalition.
