= Sarah Pickstone =

British artist (born 1965)

Sarah Pickstone (born 1965) is an English artist. She has won the 2012 John Moores Painting Prize and was awarded the 1991 Rome Scholarship in Painting to study at the British School at Rome.

== Early life ==
Pickstone was born in Manchester in 1965. She studied at University of Newcastle and Royal Academy Schools.

== Career ==
Pickstone was awarded the Rome Scholarship in Painting in 1991, subsequently spending a year at the research centre the British School at Rome.

She won the John Moores Painting Prize in 2012, having been a runner up in 2004. This made her the first female winner of the prize since Lisa Milroy over thirty years earlier. Pickstone's winning painting, Stevie Smith and the Willow, was based on an illustration accompanying Smith's 1957 poem "Not Waving But Drowning". Pickstone said the painting's depiction of a girl bathing under a willow tree "might represent some kind of everywoman - an artist or mother or child", and while the poem is "very dark", she wanted to "make something more joyous out of the poem" with her painting. Judge for the prize, Fiona Banner, said of the work: "It's [...] a painting of one artist reflected through another, a meeting of literary and pictorial minds".

Stevie Smith and the Willow is one of a series of Pickstone's works inspired by writing with connections to Regent's Park in London. Pickstone subsequently published an anthology of these paintings and others' writing, Park Notes, with Daunt Books in 2014. It followed a 2013 exhibition at the New Art Centre, The Writers Series. The exhibition referenced an all-female selection of writers including George Eliot, Virginia Woolf, Katherine Mansfield and Sylvia Plath.

In 2015 she exhibited a show, The Rehearsal, at Mercer Gallery in Harrogate. It featured works inspired by Laura Knight's Ready for Rehearsal, a drawing in the Mercer's collection which depicts dancers backstage. That same year, Contemporary Art Society supported the gallery's acquisition of six of Pickstone's paintings of literary women. These were exhibited at the gallery as part of its 2018 Picturing Women show.

2017 saw Pickstone's largest solo exhibition to date, Other Stories at CGP London (now Southwark Park Galleries). It featured paintings from her 2013 exhibition The Writers Series, and new work in response to the gallery's surroundings in Southwark Park, including a nearby rose garden dedicated to Ada Salter, environmentalist and the first female mayor of London.

From September 2018 to August 2019, the Royal Academy hosted Pickstone's exhibition An Allegory of Painting. Pickstone's works in this exhibition paid homage to works by 18th century painter Angelica Kauffman: The Rainbow reinterpreted Kauffman's Colour, with Belvedere a response to Kauffman’s Design.

Pickstone works from a studio at Cubitt in London. She is a senior faculty member at Royal Drawing School.
