= Montani (surname) =

Montani is an Italian surname. Notable people with the surname include:

- Dario Montani (born 1961), Italian former professional racing cyclist
- Matteo Montani (born 1972), Italian painter and sculptor
- Nicola Montani (1880–1948), American conductor, composer, arranger, and publisher of sacred music

== Other ==
- Palazzo Montani Antaldi, Pesaro, Neoclassical-style palace in the city of Pesaro, region of the Marche, Italy
