= Daniel Hays =

Daniel Hays may refer to:

- Dan Hays (born 1939), Canadian politician
- Dan Hays (artist) (born 1966), British artist
- Daniel Hays (New York politician) (1833–1913), American glove manufacturer and politician
- Daniel P. Hays (1854–1923), Jewish-American lawyer from New York
