= Michelle Gagliano =

American painter

- Known for: Oil painting
- Website: https://michellegagliano.com

Michelle Gagliano is an American artist based in Virginia. Her paintings incorporate natural pigments and handmade oil paints, drawing upon Renaissance recipes and landscape painting traditions. Her focus on materiality coincides with a commitment to sustainable studio practices. She has been an Active Member of the Gallery Climate Coalition since 2023.

== Early life and education ==
She was born in Jamestown, New York. She studied painting with Vernon Fisher at North Texas State University and later studied at the Chautauqua School of Art at Fisher's encouragement. She earned a Bachelor of Arts in painting from Plymouth State University and a Master of Fine Arts from American University.

== Career ==
Gagliano has completed residencies at Virginia Center for the Creative Arts, Chautauqua School of Art, and Galleria La Nica. She has presented solo exhibitions in the United States and internationally.

Gagliano created a mixed media series depicting the 34 Cantos of Dante Alighieri's "Inferno". She exhibited the series in 2017, and it was later published as ''Once Again to See the Stars: A Contemporary Vision of Dante's Inferno''.

In 2017, she was awarded a Virginia Museum of Fine Arts Fellowship Award.

In 2024, she presented a solo exhibition at the Casa Natale di Raffaello, the birthplace of Renaissance painter Raphael. A painting from this exhibition was acquired into the institution's permanent collection.

In 2026, Silvana Editoriale published a monograph devoted to Gagliano's work, "Cultivating the Sublime," written and edited by Julia Rajacic.

In addition to painting full time, Gagliano teaches part time at Virginia Commonwealth University where she has taught courses on illustrating Dante's Inferno and implementing sustainable practices in the fine artist's studio.

== Exhibitions ==
Gagliano's work has been exhibited at institutions in the United States and internationally, including the William King Museum of Art, Virginia Museum of Fine Arts, Casa natale di Raffaello, and the American Embassy (Rome, Italy).

== Collections ==
Michelle Gagliano's work is held in institutional collections including the Casa Natale di Raffaello and the University of Virginia.

Her painting The Skiffy is held in the permanent collection of the Virginia Museum of Fine Arts.

== Selected publications ==
She has published the book

- Once Again to See the Stars: A Contemporary Vision of Dante's Inferno.
