= Matteo Montani =

Italian painter and sculptor (born 1972)

- Born: 5 September 1972 (age 53); Rome, Italy
- Education: Academy of the Arts of Rome
- Known for: Painting, sculpture, installation art

Matteo Montani (born 5 September 1972 in Rome, Italy) is a contemporary Italian painter and sculptor.

== Biography ==
Matteo Montani completed his classical studies in Rome prior to joining the Academy of the Arts of Rome in the Painting and Sculpture sections, where he qualified in 1997. Between 1988 and 1996, Montani worked as an assistant in Alfredo Pirri’s studio. As a student he helped artists Günther Förg and Michelangelo Pistoletto in the preparation of their exhibitions.

Following his first gallery exhibition held in Milan at the Studio Casoli in 2000, Montani won the Suzzara Prize in Italy and the next year he was the Winner of the national selection in the Biennale of Young Artists from Europe and the Mediterranean held in Sarajevo, Bosnia and Herzegovina. In the following years, a number of Italian galleries held several solo exhibitions of Montani’s works, most notably Fabio Sargentini’s historical gallery L'Attico, presenting works by Gilbert & George, Joseph Beuys, Jannis Kounellis, Gino De Dominicis or Sol LeWitt. In 2008, Montani took part in the Rome Quadriennale.

Over 2010 and 2011, Matteo Montani also exhibited his production abroad in solo exhibitions in Greece at the Kalfayan Gallery, in New York at the Casa Italiana Zerilli-Marimò and in several German cities, amongst which Würzburg at the Museum Am Dom for his 2011 Seelenlandschaft exhibition featuring monumental paintings.

Montani has taken part in many group exhibitions with artists such as Mimmo Paladino, Markus Lüpertz, Mark Francis, Jannis Kounellis, Vasco Bendini, and Ian Davenport. Hr has also exhibited at international art fairs such as the Bologna Arte Fiera, Turin Artissima, Art Los Angeles, Pulse Miami, Art Dubai. His collaborations with well-established galleries have grown - the Marilena Bonomo Gallery for exhibitions with Kiki Smith, sculptor James Brown, photographer Elger Esser, the Otto Gallery, or the PACI Contemporary gallery. He was also invited to exhibit in several museums, most notably the Museum of Art of Ravenna MAR. In 2013 he won the Jury Special Prize of the Premio Michetti.

In 2014 the National Gallery of Modern Art of Rome acquired for its permanent collection a wax installation previously exhibited (and partially melted in the course of the exhibition) during his 2014 solo exhibition Andarsene at the H. C. Andersen Museum, Rome.

Since 2015 Luca Tommasi’s Milan-based gallery has exhibited Montani’s works in Italy, alongside other artists such as Alexis Harding, Philip Taaffe, Alberto di Fabio, and Paul Jenkins.

== Main exhibitions ==
- 2017 Unfolding, Galleria Nicola Pedana, Caserta, Italy, The Glow and The Glare, Luca Tommasi Arte Contemporanea Gallery, Milan, Italy
- 2016 Racconto Rosso, Fabio Sargentini-L'Attico, Rome, Italy.
- 2016 Once Upon a Time Life, Again, The Elkon Gallery, New York, USA.
- 2015 Things Behind, Luca Tommasi Arte Contemporanea Gallery, Milan, Italy, Matteo Montani (con Peter Flaccus), the Otto Gallery, Bologna, Italy
- 2014 Andarsene, Museo H. C. Andersen, Roma, Italy
- 2012 Bendini-Montani, Museo Carichieti, Chieti, Italy, I luoghi del’immagine (con Marco Grimaldi), Gallery Morone, Milan, Italy
- 2011 Seelenlandschaft, Museum am Dom, Würzburg, Germany
- 2010 Il guardiano della soglia, Kalfayan Galleries, Athens, Greece, Matteo Montani, Casa Italiana Zerilli-Marimò, USA, A cielo aperto, Otto Gallery, Bologna, Italy, Naturaldurante, Gallery Marilena Bonomo, Bari, Italy
- 2009 Abbassare il cielo agli occhi, The PACI Contemporary gallery, Brescia, Italy
- 2008 15th Rome Quadriennale, Il bacio e altre strade per le stelle", Gallery Valentina Bonomo, Rome, Italy, Matteo Montani", Ravenna Art Museum, Ravenna, Italy
- 2007 Foster, Gallery L’Attico - Fabio Sargentini, Rome, Italy
- 2005 Passerò per via Nicolò dell’Arca, Marilena Bonomo Gallery, Bari, Italy

== Main galleries and museums ==
- 2017 – Galleria Nicola Pedana, Caserta, Italy
- 2007/2015/2016 – Fabio Sargentini-L’Attico Gallery, Rome, Italy
- 2016 – The Elkon Gallery, New York City, United States
- 2015/2017 – Luca Tommasi Gallery, Milan, Italy
- 2014 – H. C. Andersen Museum, Rome, Italy
- 2012 – Con Vasco Bendini, The Carichieti Foundation Museum, Chieti, Italy
- 2011 – Museum Am Dom Würzburg, Würzburg, Germany
- 2010/2014 – Otto Gallery, Bologna, Italy
- 2010 – The Zerilli-Marimò Foundation, New York, USA
- 2010 – Kalfayan Galleries, Athens, Greece
- 2008 – MAR Ravenna, Italy
- 2008 – Valentina Bonomo Gallery, Rome, Italy
- 2005 – Marilena Bonomo Gallery, Bari, Italy

== Main collections ==
- The National Gallery of Modern Art – Rome, Italy
- Unicredit – Milan, Italy
- Artefiera – Bologna, Italy
- Collezione Benetton – Trevise, Italy
- Fondazione La Quadriennale – Rome, Italy
- MAR, Ravenna – Italy
- The VAF Foundation – Italy
- Museum Burg – Miltenberg, Germany
- Museum Am Dom – Würzburg, Germany
- Novartis Corporated – Whippanny (New Jersey), USA

== Prizes and awards ==
- 2013 – Premio Michetti, Italy, Winner of the Special Jury Prize
- 2009 – Terna Award 02, Italy, Finalist
- 2008 – Cairo Award, Milan, Italy, Finalist
- 2008 – Talent Prize, Rome, Italy, Finalist
- 2007 – Lissone Award, Lissone, Italy, Finalist
- 2001 – Biennale of Young Artists from Europe and the Mediterranean, Sarajevo, Bosnia and Herzegovina, Winner in the national selection
- 2000 – XL Suzzara Prize, Suzzara, Italy, Winner
