= Kathryn Maple =

Contemporary artist

Kathryn Maple (born 1989) is an English artist based in South London who has won the Sunday Times Watercolour Competition and John Moores Painting Prize.

== Early life ==
Maple was born in Canterbury, Kent, in 1989, and raised in Maidstone. She graduated from the University of Brighton in 2011 with a Bachelor of Arts in Fine Art Printmaking. She then studied at the Royal Drawing School.

== Career ==
Maple has won the Sunday Times Watercolour Competition on two occasions: once in 2014 and once in 2016. Her winning painting in 2014 was Fat Boy's Diner, which depicts a cafe near Trinity Buoy Wharf in London. She used the £10,000 prize money to travel to India. The trip inspired her winning 2016 entry, Sandy Shoes. What Maple describes as its "part real, part imagined" scene is the product of a visit to the island of Vypin.

Maple won the John Moores Painting Prize in March 2021 with her work The Common. Judge Michelle Williams Gamaker commented that the painting "struck a chord during the judging [...] perhaps because it depicts the very thing we are currently unable to share" due to COVID restrictions, and that it "embodies the deeply social nature of humans".

Maple subsequently presented a solo exhibition at Liverpool's Walker Art Gallery, which hosts the prize. She is only the second of the prize's winners to do so, after 2019's winner Jacqui Hallum. The Common is on permanent display at the gallery. Maple told The Guardian, "You always hope your work will get into a national collection [...] so you can return to see it when you’re 80 with your friends".

Maple is a participant in the Artists Support Pledge, an initiative where artists sell their work, pledging to buy the work of another artist once their proceeds reach £1000. She has said it helped her with bills, and enabled her to buy three pieces by other artists.

Maple lives and works in South London.

== Publications ==
- Maple, Kathryn (2023). A Year of Drawings. Anomie Publishing (published 6 April 2023). ISBN 978-1-910221-47-1.
