= Peter McDonald =

Peter McDonald may refer to:

- Peter J. McDonald (1912–1971), Canadian politician
- Peter McDonald (critic) (born 1962), Northern Irish poet and academic
- Peter McDonald (actor) (born 1972), Irish stage and screen actor
- Peter McDonald (artist) (born 1973), Japanese/English artist
- Peter McDonald (demographer) (born 1946), Australian demographer
- Peter McDonald (cyclist) (born 1978), Australian cyclist
- Peter McDonald (footballer) (1924–2022), Irish footballer
- Peter McDonald (MP) (1836–1891), Irish member of parliament
- Peter D. McDonald, professor of English

== See also ==
- Peter MacDonald (disambiguation)
