= Hallum (surname) =

Hallum is a surname. Notable people with the surname include:

- Carsten Hallum (born 1969), Danish footballer and mechanical worker
- Jacqui Hallum (born 1977), British artist
- Jake Hallum (1938–2015), American football coach and scout
