= Ally Fallon =

British artist

Ally Fallon (born 1998) is a British artist. He was born in London, and is based in Manchester.

He studied at Manchester School of Art from 2022 to 2023. He was part of the 2024 cohort of Louise Giovanelli's Apollo Painting School.

He won the 2025 John Moores Painting Prize with his painting If You Were Certain, What Would You Do Then?, receiving a solo exhibition at Liverpool's Walker Art Gallery along with £25,000. He became the competition's youngest ever winner, at age 27. His painting was one of over 3000 anonymous submissions, judged by a panel including Giovanelli, Zhang Enli, Michael Simpson, and Zoé Whitley.
