= John Moores Painting Prize =

- Awarded for: Painting prize
- Location: Liverpool
- Country: England
- Hosted by: Walker Art Gallery
- Reward: £25,000
- First award: 1957
- Website: www.liverpoolmuseums.org.uk

The John Moores Painting Prize is a biennial award to the best contemporary painting, submission is open to the public. The prize is named for Sir John Moores, noted philanthropist, who established the award in 1957. The winning work and short-listed pieces are exhibited at the Walker Art Gallery as part of the Liverpool Biennial festival of visual art.

== History ==
Liverpool businessman John Moores, aside from his work with the Littlewoods retail and football betting company, was a keen amateur painter. Out of frustration with the difficulty he had in finding an audience for his paintings, he financed an exhibition to which other artists in a similar situation could send their work, and compete to win prize money. The first such exhibition was held in 1957, with the winning entry becoming the property of Liverpool's Walker Art Gallery. In the prize's early years, the winning painting was not always acquired by the gallery, but this has been done consistently since 1978. Up until 1963, the prize exhibitions also included sculpture, since which time it has only allowed paintings.

Journalist Tim Hilton, who judged the prize in 1988, wrote in 1993 that the prizewinners generally "reflect the mood of the year". For example: the first prize in 1957, while kitchen sink realism was en vogue, went to Jack Smith and the junior prize the same year went to John Bratby, both artists working in that style. The junior prize was only awarded up until 1967.

Early sixties prizes for Roger Hilton and Henry Mundy reflected the new decade's tendency towards colourful painting, moving on to minimal colour fields (Michael Tyzack, 1965 winner) and pop-style winners for David Hockney and Richard Hamilton in '67 and '69 respectively. Early seventies winners reverted to a more figurative style that Hilton likened to that of the Euston Road School (Euan Uglow, 1972 winner, and Myles Murphy, 1974 winner), in contrast to the conceptual art prevalent at the time.

A string of abstract artist winners between 1976 and 1982 (John Walker, Noel Forster, Mick Moon, John Hoyland) meant that, according to Hilton, the prize had become "predictable", and the winning painting would usually be "large, amply proportioned, handsome, almost over-serious and always painted by a man". In Hilton's view, the two subsequent winners were a reaction to this seriousness: in 1985, winner Bruce McLean "cheekily imitate[d] the pomp of painterly abstraction", while 1987's winner Tim Head parodied serious art with a repetitive pattern of cows heads.

1989's winner was Lisa Milroy. She was the first woman to win the prize outright, though Mary Martin shared the 1969 prize with Richard Hamilton. National Museums Liverpool also states that 1989 was the first time the prize was judged by a majority female jury. All-male juries had not been uncommon up until 1985.

2002's winner, "Super Star Fucker - Andy Warhol Text Painting" by Peter Davies, was noted by critic Adrian Searle as being "undoubtedly the first painting in 'the Moores' ever to contain the f-word". That same year saw the introduction of the Visitors' Choice Prize, in which exhibition attendees are able to vote for their favourite work.

2004's exhibition was described by Laura Gascoigne in The Spectator as being "dominated by three current trends: obsessive pattern-making, surreal 'bedroom' painting and cheerless realism". That year's prize was won by Alexis Harding.

The John Moores Painting Prize China was launched in 2010 in Shanghai. Alongside the British exhibition, five winners from the Chinese competition were shown at the Walker Art Gallery. This has become a regular feature of the UK prize exhibition.

Sarah Pickstone won first prize in 2012, having been a runner up in 2004. This made her the first female winner of the prize since Lisa Milroy over thirty years earlier. Pickstone's winning painting, Stevie Smith and the Willow, was based on an illustration accompanying Smith's 1957 poem "Not Waving But Drowning". Pickstone said the painting's depiction of a girl bathing under a willow tree "might represent some kind of everywoman - an artist or mother or child", and while the poem is "very dark", she wanted to "make something more joyous out of the poem" with her painting. Judge for the prize, Fiona Banner, said of the work: "It's [...] a painting of one artist reflected through another, a meeting of literary and pictorial minds".

In 2013, artist Peter Blake, noted for his sleeve design for the Beatles' 1967 album Sgt. Pepper's Lonely Hearts Club Band, was named as the prize's first patron.

2014's prize recipient, Rose Wylie, was cited by The Art Newspaper as an example of how the prize can "supercharge" the careers of its winners. In the three years after she won at the age of 80, she was awarded the Order of the British Empire and joined the David Zwirner Gallery.

A prize for artists in their final year of an art education program, or within two years of graduating, was introduced in 2020, the Emerging Artist Prize. The first winner of this was Kiki Xuebing Wang, who also won the Visitors' Choice prize the same year.

Kathryn Maple won the 2021 prize with her work The Common. Judge Michelle Williams Gamaker commented that the painting "struck a chord during the judging [...] perhaps because it depicts the very thing we are currently unable to share" due to COVID restrictions, and that it "embodies the deeply social nature of humans". Maple subsequently presented a solo exhibition at the Walker Art Gallery. She is only the second of the prize's winners to do so, after 2019's winner Jacqui Hallum. The Common is on permanent display at the gallery. Maple told The Guardian, "You always hope your work will get into a national collection [...] so you can return to see it when you're 80 with your friends".

Graham Crowley won first prize in 2023, having entered 10 times since 1976. He was previously shortlisted twice, and has served on the prize's judging panel. In 1993, Tim Hilton had already referred to Crowley as an "old lag" of the prize alongside Adrian Henri, calling the latter the "unofficial mayor of Liverpool" for his frequent inclusion in Moores exhibitions.

Ally Fallon, aged 27, became the youngest ever winner of the prize in 2025 with his work If You Were Certain, What Would You Do Then?. The 2025 competition had over 3000 entries, and the judging panel included Louise Giovanelli, Michael Simpson, Zoé Whitley, and Zhang Enli.

== First prize winners ==
Year	Artist	Artwork	Walker Art Gallery	Art UK	Notes	Ref.
1957	Jack Smith	Creation and Crucifixion	View	View		
1959	Patrick Heron	Black Painting - Red, Brown and Olive : July 1959			Private collection	
1961	Henry Mundy	Cluster		View	Bristol Art Gallery collection	
1963	Roger Hilton	March 1963		View		
1965	Michael Tyzack	Alesso 'B'		View		
1967	David Hockney	Peter Getting Out of Nick's Pool	View	View		
1969	Richard Hamilton	Toaster			Private collection	
1969	Mary Martin	Cross	View			
1972	Euan Uglow	Nude, 12 vertical positions from the eye		View	Victoria Gallery & Museum collection	
1974	Myles Murphy	Figure with Yellow Foreground		View	Tate collection	
1976	John Walker	Juggernaut with plume - for P Neruda				
1978	Noel Forster	A painting in six stages with a silk triangle		View		
1980	Mick Moon	Box-room		View		
1982	John Hoyland	Broken Bride 13.6.82		View		
1985	Bruce McLean	Oriental Garden Kyoto		View		
1987	Tim Head	Cow mutations		View		
1989	Lisa Milroy	Handles		View		
1991	Andrzej Jackowski	The Beekeeper's son		View		
1993	Peter Doig	Blotter	View	View		
1995	David Leapman	Double-Tongued Knowability		View		
1997	Dan Hays	Harmony in Green		View		
1999	Michael Raedecker	Mirage		View		
2002	Peter Davies	Super Star Fucker - Andy Warhol Text Painting	View	View		
2004	Alexis Harding	Slump/Fear (Orange/Black) 2004		View		
2006	Martin Greenland	Before Vermeer's Clouds		View		
2008	Peter McDonald	Fontana		View		
2010	Keith Coventry	Spectrum Jesus				
2012	Sarah Pickstone	Stevie Smith and the Willow				
2014	Rose Wylie	PV Windows and Floorboards	View	View		
2016	Michael Simpson	Squint (19)				
2018	Jacqui Hallum	King and Queen of Wands				
2021	Kathryn Maple	The Common				
2023	Graham Crowley	Light Industry				
2025	Ally Fallon	If You Were Certain, What Would You Do Then?				

== See also ==
- List of European art awards
