= Sunday Times Watercolour Competition =

British art competition

The Sunday Times Watercolour Competition is a nationwide competition promoting the art of painting in water-based media in the United Kingdom.

It was launched in 1988 as the Kaupthing Singer and Friedlander / Sunday Times Watercolour Competition, through sponsorship by Kaupthing Bank and The Sunday Times. Kaupthing ceased to sponsor the prize after the bank was taken over. As of 2012, it is co-sponsored by the Royal Watercolour Society and so called the RWS/Sunday Times Watercolour Competition.

The first prize winner was Tom Coates. Subsequent winners have included Trevor Stubley (1990), Carl Randall (1998, the youngest ever 1st prize winner), Stuart Pearson Wright (1999; third prize), Leslie Worth, and Carol Robertson.

The 2007 winner was Julia Farrer. In 2008, 2,000 works were submitted, with 100 exhibited at the Royal Watercolour Society's Bankside Gallery, and a £25,000 prize fund, that year's winner being Jennifer McRae.

Kathryn Maple has won the competition on two occasions: once in 2014 and once in 2016. Her winning painting in 2014 was Fat Boy's Diner, which depicts a cafe near Trinity Buoy Wharf in London. She used the £10,000 prize money to travel to India. The trip inspired her winning 2016 entry, Sandy Shoes. What Maple describes as its "part real, part imagined" scene is the product of a visit to the island of Vypin.
