= Mick Moon (artist) =

British artist (1937–2024)

Mick Moon RA
- Born: Michael Moon; 9 November 1937; Edinburgh, Scotland
- Died: 13 February 2024 (aged 86); London, England
- Education: Chelsea School of Art (1958–62); Royal College of Art (1962–63)
- Awards: John Moores Painting Prize (1980)
- Elected: Royal Academician (23 May 1994)
- Website: Mick Moon – Art UK

Mick Moon RA (9 November 1937 – 13 February 2024) was a British artist and Royal Academician. He died in London on 13 February 2024, at the age of 86.

== Collections ==
- Arts Council Collection
- Government Art Collection
- Victoria and Albert Museum, London
- Tate, London
- Walker Art Gallery, Liverpool
- Scottish National Gallery, Edinburgh
- Calouste Gulbenkian Foundation, Lisbon
- Australian National Gallery, Canberra
- Art Gallery of New South Wales, Sydney
