= Michael Tyzack =

British painter

Michael Tyzack (3 August 1933 – 11 February 2007) was a British painter and printmaker. He is considered an important representative of contemporary abstract painting. He was also known as a jazz musician.

== Life and work ==
Michael Tyzack was born in Sheffield, Yorkshire, and was the son of a cutler and a civil servant. After finishing school, he was educated at the Sheffield College of Art. When he left Sheffield in 1952, he studied at the Slade School of Fine Art until 1955. In 1956, he won a French Government Scholarship to study and paint in France for a year. He chose to stay in Paris and Menton.

Among his most important teachers were William Townsend, Victor Pasmore, Lucian Freud and Sir William Coldstream. Among his fellow students included, among others, Patrick Heron and William Scott.

After his return in 1957, he was active as a jazz musician in addition to his painting. He spent two years as a professional jazz trumpeter with a Bristol-based Oriole Jazz Band.

Tyzack was a member of 56 Group Wales from 1967 to 1972.

Tyzack's painting Alesso 'B' (a reference to Alesso Baldovineti's National Gallery Portrait of a Lady in Yellow) won the first prize at the 1965 John Moores Painting Prizes in Liverpool.

His work is characterized by its colour-happy Geometric abstraction. In 1968, he was a participant of the fourth 'documenta' in Kassel, with six geometric-abstract paintings.

Since 1955 his work has been exhibited in over 50 group exhibitions in the UK and in France, Switzerland, Netherlands, Italy, Brazil, Australia and Canada.

Michael Tyzack was a teacher in the UK, specifically at Cardiff College of Art, and North America and was a professor at the College of Charleston from 1976 until his death in 2007.

He died, aged 73, in Johns Island, South Carolina, United States.

== Literature and sources ==
- Ausstellungskatalog zur IV. documenta: IV. documenta. Internationale Ausstellung; Katalog: Band 1: (Malerei und Plastik); Band 2: (Graphik/Objekte); Kassel 1968
- Kimpel, Harald / Stengel, Karin: documenta IV 1968 Internationale Ausstellung – Eine fotografische Rekonstruktion (Schriftenreihe des documenta-Archives); Bremen 2007, ISBN 978-3-86108-524-9

== Links ==
- Examples of his works
