= Martin Greenland =

British painter

Martin Greenland (born 1962) is a British artist, born in Marsden, Yorkshire and now based in the Lake District.

== Early life ==
Greenland studied at Nelson and Colne College of Art from 1979 to 1987, and Exeter College of Art from 1981 to 1985.

== Career ==
Greenland won the 2006 John Moores Painting Prize with his work Before Vermeer’s Clouds. The painting, an oil on canvas, is based on Jan Vermeer's A View of Deflt, and was selected by a jury that included Peter Blake, Tracey Emin, and Jason Brooks.

John Spurling, writing for The Spectator in 2009, described him as "a bold and ambitious artist using the past to rediscover and repossess the natural world of our own time" producing "large, skilful, traditionally painterly landscapes".

Greenland's painting National Park is in the collection of Tullie House Museum and Art Gallery, having been purchased with support from the Art Fund and the Victoria and Albert Museum's Purchase Grant Fund.
