= Andrzej Jackowski =

British-Polish artist (born 1947)

- Born: Andrzej Jackowski; 1947 (age 78–79); Penley Polish Hospital no. 3, Penley, Wrexham, UK
- Education: Camberwell School of Arts and Crafts, 1969; Falmouth School of Art, 1973; Royal College of Art, 1977
- Occupations: Painter; printmaker; drafter; teacher
- Awards: John Moores Painting Prize, 1991
- Website: www.jackowski.co.uk

Andrzej Jackowski (born 1947) is a British-Polish painter, printmaker, drafter and teacher.

== Early life and education ==
Andrzej Jackowski was born in 1947 in Penley Polish Hospital no. 3, a Polish resettlement camp in Penley, to Polish refugee parents. Jackowski spent the first 11 years of his life in Penley camp and attended a Polish language school. Jackowski was later sent with his half-brother to Nottingham to learn English. In 1958, the family moved to London and his parents later separated in 1961. Jackowski attended Holland Park School.

From 1966 to 1969, Jackowski studied at the Camberwell School of Arts and Crafts under Euan Uglow. Jackowski later attended the Falmouth School of Art from 1972 to 1973, and the Royal College of Art from 1974 to 1977.

== Selected exhibitions ==
=== Solo ===
- University of Surrey (1978)
- Marlborough Fine Art (1986, 1989 and 1991)
- Purdy Hicks Gallery (1994, 1997, 1999, 2002 and 2003)

== Awards ==
- John Moores Painting Prize (1991)

== Bibliography ==
- Hyman, Timothy. (2003). Andrzej Jackowski: A Drawing Retrospective 1963–2003. Centre of Contemporary Art, University of Brighton, in association with Purdy Hicks Gallery. ISBN 9781873184233.
