= Peter MacDonald =

Peter MacDonald may refer to:

- Peter Macdonald (Canadian politician) (1835–1923), Canadian Liberal MP for Huron East, Ontario, first elected in 1887
- Peter Macdonald (Conservative politician) (1895–1961), MP for the Isle of Wight (1924–1959)
- Peter MacDonald (Navajo leader) (born 1928), former Navajo tribal chairman
- Peter MacDonald (director) (born 1939), British director
- Peter Macdonald (Australian politician) (born 1943), former mayor of Manly; former independent member of New South Wales Legislative Assembly for Manly
- Peter MacDonald (computer programmer) (born 1957), early Linux programmer
- Peter MacDonald (footballer) (born 1980), Scottish professional football player
- Peter Fitzallan MacDonald (1830–1919), Member of the Queensland Legislative Assembly, Australia
- Peter MacDonald (Scottish clergyman), former Leader of the Iona Community

== See also ==
- Peter McDonald (disambiguation)
