= Myles Murphy (painter) =

English painter (1927–2016)

Myles Murphy

Myles Francis Martin Murphy (14 February 1927 – 16 November 2016) was an English painter known for his mathematical approach to depictions of the human figure which he learned at the Slade School of Art where he later taught. In 1954 he was seriously burned while painting himself in a wedding dress but subsequently won the Slade diploma prize for the portrait he was working on at the time. In 1974, he won the John Moores Painting Prize for Figure with Yellow Foreground.

== Early life ==
Myles Murphy was born on 14 February 1927 in Bury, Lancashire, into a Catholic family of eight children. His parents intended him to train as a doctor but instead he was influenced into art by L. S. Lowry who was teaching evening classes in Bury. He entered the Slade School of Art where he stayed for four years until 1955 and was taught by William Coldstream and Claude Rogers. He joined a group of students to whom Coldstream taught a precise method of depicting the human form using mathematical measuring that Murphy used for the rest of his life.

In 1954, at his flat in Lower Marsh, in London's South Bank, Murphy planned to paint his then-girlfriend in a wedding dress. When she failed to arrive to model it, he decided to prepare a self-portrait in front of a mirror, wearing the dress himself. While doing so, the dress caught fire when it touched a paraffin heater and Murphy fell backwards on to a sofa that had been covered by his flatmate with petrol in order to kill bedbugs. In attempting to extinguish the flames, Murphy threw burning furniture out of the flat window onto the street market below. He was badly burned but recovered sufficiently to win the Slade diploma prize for the painting he was working on at the time.

In 1955, he and Craigie Aitchison, a fellow student and close friend, won an Abbey Travelling Scholarship and drove to Ravenna in Italy in a dilapidated old London taxi that Aitchison bought for £45. The taxi finally broke down outside Rome central station where the two students were assisted by a cleric from the Vatican who stored the vehicle in the Vatican's basement.

== Career ==
Figure with Yellow Foreground. Oil on canvas, 1974. 152 by 245 centimetres (60 in × 96 in). Tate Gallery, London.

In 1959, Murphy became a teacher at the Slade School of Art and in 1960, senior lecturer at Chelsea College of Arts, where he remained until 1981. His students included Patrick Caulfield and Cherry Pickles. He continued to paint, often destroying or reusing his canvasses and ignoring their commercial or critical value. His Yellow Nude (Oil on canvas, 1963, Southbank Centre, London) was acquired for the Arts Council Collection from the London Group in 1964.

In 1974, he won the John Moores Painting Prize for Figure with Yellow Foreground which the Tate Gallery describes as showing "a sophisticated balance of observed detail and abstract, flat planes of colour." The painting was acquired by the gallery in 1994 with assistance from the Knapping Fund.

In 1981, he became the principal of Wimbledon School of Art until retiring in 1987.

== Personal life ==
In 1977, Murphy married Dawn Martin who had first been introduced to him by Euan Uglow as a model. The couple had two daughters, Inez Murphy and Sian Murphy.

Murphy died of pneumonia on 16 November 2016 at the age of 89. He was survived by his wife and children.

== Selected group exhibitions ==
Group exhibitions included:

- 1952, Young Contemporaries, Tate Gallery, London.
- 1960, Modern British Portraits, Arts Council, London.
- 1964, New Painting, Arts Council, London.
- 1974, 9th John Moores Liverpool Exhibition.
- 1994, Five Protagonists: Craigie Aitchison, Anthony Eyton, Patrick George, Myles Murphy, Euan Uglow, Browse and Darby, London.
- 2005, Three Points of View, Myles Murphy, Patrick Symons, Euan Uglow, Browse & Darby, London.

== See also ==
- Martin Froy
