= Louise Giovanelli =

British painter

Louise Giovanelli (born 1993) is a British painter.

== Biography ==
Giovanelli was raised in Monmouth, south Wales by parents of Italian and Irish Catholic descent. She received a Bachelor's degree from the Manchester School of Art in 2015, and completed postgraduate studies at the Städelschule in Frankfurt am Main in 2020.

Her works primarily feature subjects chosen for their formal qualities, including staged photographs, film stills, classical sculpture, and architectural elements. Her work is included in the collections of the Manchester Art Gallery, the Akzo Nobel Art Foundation, Amsterdam and the United Kingdom Government Art Collection.

She is one of the founders of the Apollo Painting School. In 2025 she was one of the judges of the John Moores Painting Prize, won by Ally Fallon, a graduate of the Apollo school.

She was also judge of the 2025 New Contemporaries and four graduates of Louise Giovanelli's Apollo School were selected as finalists.

== Solo Exhibitions ==
- Louise Giovanelli: A Song of Ascents (18 October 2024 - 1 March 2026), Villa Stuck, Munich, Germany.
- Louise Giovanelli: A Song of Ascents (23 November 2024 - 21 April 2025), The Hepworth Wakefield, Wakefield, UK.
- Louise Giovanelli. Here on Earth (26 March – 18 May 2024), White Cube, Hong Kong.
- Louise Giovanelli - Paintings 2019 - 2024 (23 March - 16 June 2024), He Art Museum (HEM), Foshan, China.
- Louise Giovanelli (6 June 2019 - 19 April 2020), Manchester Art Gallery, Manchester, UK.
