= Noel Forster =

English painter

Noel Armstrong Forster (15 June 1932 – 7 December 2007) was a British artist who trained at King's College Newcastle a part of Durham University, graduating in 1957.

Forster was born in Seaton Delaval, Northumberland and attended to Gosforth Grammar School. He married Eileen Conlon in 1962, later having three sons with her. In due course he became Principal lecturer in Painting at the Chelsea College of Art & Design in Chelsea as well as Artist-in-Residence and Supernumerary Fellow at Balliol College Oxford University. In 1978 he won the John Moores Painting Prize His art can best be described as abstract, colourful and usually involving a cross-weaved fabric of straight or curved parallel lines drawn by hand, often executed in oil on linen. He died in London.

"Noel was in my view the most important post-War abstract painter in England, and his work combined performance, intellectual rigour and the artist's craft. It was simultaneously clever and sensuous. He was an influential teacher too and a very gifted musician. But he was also larger than life." Stephen Bury, Curator, British Library, 8 December 2007

"Noel was a splendid friend, and a wonderful painter.He thought endlessly about the relations of paint and light, and talked with extraordinary clarity - and complexity - about making works of art. He taught me a lot about looking.The ideas behind his own work were intricate and uncompromising."

http://www.noelforster.co.uk AS Byatt, Author, Dec 2007

"Noel Forster was an adventurous and productive artist whose glowing, audacious personality looked out from his canvasses." Obituary in The Times, 17 January 2008 Bernard Cohen, Artist, Dec 2007
