= Graham Crowley =

British painter (born 1950)

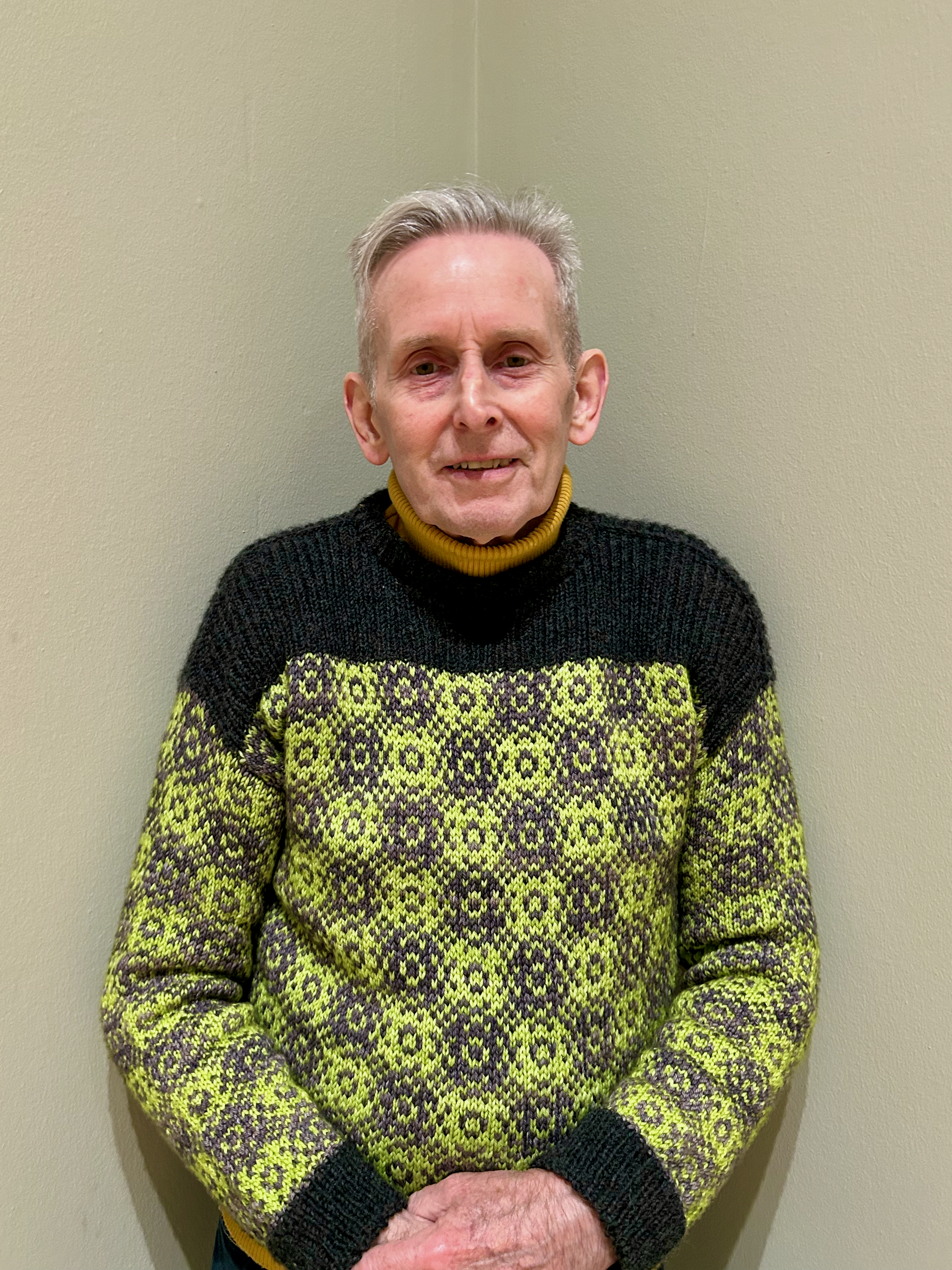
- Crowley at his I Paint Shadows exhibition at Walker Art Gallery, March 2025
- Born: 1950 (age 75–76); Romford
- Education: Saint Martin's School of Art, Royal College of Art

Graham Crowley (born 1950) is a British painter. He studied at Saint Martin's School of Art and the Royal College of Art.

His style evolved from abstract flat forms and bold colours in the 1970s towards a later focus on more figurative subjects, in particular in domestic settings. In the 1990s, he moved from England to West Cork, Ireland, where he focused on landscape painting.

On returning to England, he was appointed Professor of Painting at the Royal College of Art in 1998. In 2023, he won the John Moores Painting Prize with his tenth entry since 1976.

== Life and career ==
=== Early life, education, and early work ===
Graham Crowley was born on 3 May 1950 in Romford, London. His heritage is Irish and Polish Jewish. He studied at Saint Martin's School of Art from 1968 to 1972, and the Royal College of Art from 1972 to 1975.

Crowley's 1970s abstract paintings were characterised by bold colours, flat forms and what Marco Livingstone calls "a playful post-Cubist idiom". Crowley has described these as "reworks" of paintings by Fernand Leger. In the mid-2020s he explained that during this period he believed that "notions of originality had become unsustainable" and that these works would now be described as appropriationist or post-modern. One such work, Tug (1975), was Crowley's first entry in the John Moores Painting Prize in 1976 for the prize's tenth edition. It is made using chalk on a canvas collage, hung on its point, and is held in the Arts Council Collection.

=== 1980s turn to figurative subjects ===
In the early 1980s Crowley began to paint more figurative subjects, often focused on domestic settings which addressed themes of Thatcherite Britain. Livingstone describes So and Sew (1980) as having a "manic" and "comically charged" atmosphere in which the sewing actions of a seamstress have exploded the figure into "strongly modelled, volumetric forms". This painting was entered in the 1980 John Moores Painting Prize.

In the 1982–1983 academic year, Crowley was artist-in-residence at Oxford University, where he built on the figurative style first shown in So and Sew, with domestic objects such kitchen implements and DIY tools taking on animated, human attributes. Livingstone compares the anthropomorphic transformations seen in these works to 1930s surrealism. One work from this period, Spider with Mushroom Soup (held in the Arts Council Collection), uses the common objects of a can opener and tin to create what Livingstone describes as a "psychologically threatening" scene of "sexual intrigue and domestic violence". In Grove Art Online, he writes that the jagged edges of an opened tin become the image of a vagina dentata, with the painting borrowing from the language of film noir and expressionist cinema.

Throughout the 1980s Crowley continued to produce works with similar domestic themes. His 1985 entry for the fourteenth John Moores Painting Prize was entitled Table Manners 4. In Living Memory (1986) addresses childhood fears through Dickensian scenes of South London, with cutaway scenes of houses.

=== 1990s inspiration in Ireland and beyond ===
From the mid-nineties Crowley lived in West Cork, having purchased a house in the village of Rineen. During this time his work was inspired by the landscapes of the area. Craig Burnett, writing for Modern Painters, compared Crowley's work of this era to J. M. W. Turner and John Constable. Initially seeming to be romantic, idyllic vistas, these landscapes actually include details like telephone cables and "viler desecrations" (Livingstone) that, according to Benezit Dictionary of Artists, show the "merging of rural and suburban environments".

After his time in Ireland, Crowley moved back to England. Seeking an alternative to London, he settled in Suffolk. Crowley was appointed Professor of Painting at the Royal College of Art in 1998.

In 2002, Crowley was shortlisted for the Jerwood Painting Prize. Crowley won the John Moores Painting Prize in 2023 with his work Light Industry, having entered ten times since 1976. The painting depicts a motorcycle dealership, of which Crowley said: "What I found enthralling about the place was the light; a diffused, dusty kind of light that emanated from a grubby, obscured skylight".
