= Carl Randall =

British figurative painter

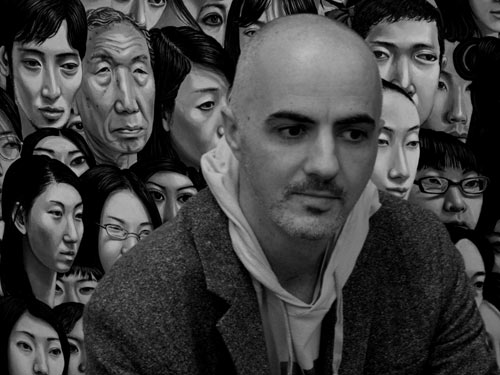
- Artist Carl Randall
- Born: Carlo Lombardi; UK
- Education: Slade School of Fine Art, Royal Drawing School, Tokyo University of the Arts
- Known for: Painting / fine art
- Awards: 2012 BP Travel Award, London; 2011 Nomura Art Prize, Japan; 1998 Singer & Friedlander Watercolour Competition
- Website: www.carlrandall.com

Carl Randall, born Carlo Lombardi, is a British figurative painter, whose work is based on images of modern Japan, resulting from the artist living for a decade in Tokyo. These works came to prominence after they were exhibited at the National Portrait Gallery in London, and other exhibitions in the UK and Japan. He also subsequently made a series of paintings based on contemporary London.

== Early life and education ==
Randall was born Carlo Lombardi.

He is a graduate of the Slade School of Fine Art London (BA Fine Art), the Royal Drawing School London (The Drawing Year), and Tokyo University of the Arts Japan (MFA & PhD Fine Art).

== Career ==
=== Japan paintings ===
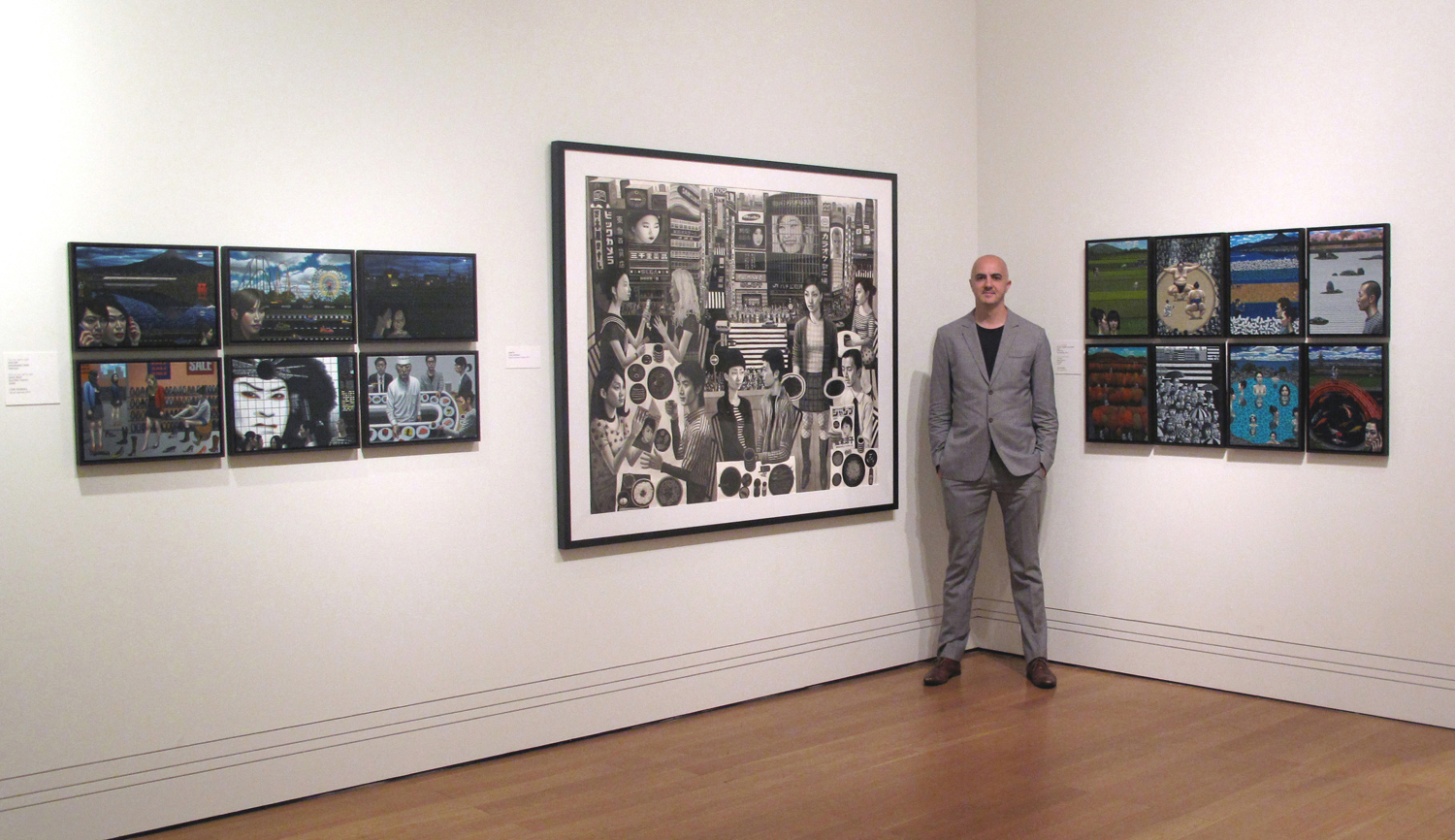
Carl Randall with his Japan Travel Award work at the National Portrait Gallery, London, 2013

Randall was awarded the BP Travel Award 2012, for his proposal to walk in the footsteps of the Japanese ukiyo-e printmaker Andō Hiroshige, creating paintings of the people and places of contemporary Japan. His time in Japan resulted in a group of 15 paintings exhibited at the National Portrait Gallery in London as part of the 2013 BP Portrait Award exhibition In the Footsteps of Hiroshige – The Tokaido Highway and Portraits of Modern Japan.

The exhibition subsequently toured to the Aberdeen Art Gallery in Scotland, Wolverhampton Art Gallery in England, and then formed his solo exhibition in Japan, Portraits from Edo to the Present at the Shizuoka City Tokaido Hiroshige Museum in Shizuoka, where the paintings were exhibited alongside Hiroshige's original The Fifty-three Stations of the Tōkaidō woodblock prints. In conjunction with these exhibitions, the book Carl Randall – Japan Portraits was published, illustrating paintings and drawings made in Japan, with a foreword by British author Desmond Morris, and an introduction by the late American writer Donald Richie.

A short documentary, Carl Randall – Japan Portraits, showed Randall painting and drawing in Japan. His Japan paintings were also the subject of a 2016 interview by the BBC World Service, and he was also interviewed by CNN about his Japanese work.

In 2026, he was commissioned by Creative Restaurant Group to make a series of paintings for Kioku by Endo, a high-end contemporary Japanese restaurant founded by Michelin star chef Kazutoshi Endo, on the top floor of luxury hotel Raffles London at The OWO in Whitehall, London. The brief given to Randall was to create paintings that responded to the restaurant's environment and incorporated Japanese influences.

=== London paintings ===
London Portraits is a series of 15 paintings made upon Randall's return to the UK, of people who have contributed to British culture and society. Each sitter was asked to choose a location in London for the background of their portrait. They include newscaster Jon Snow, actress Julie Walters, comedian Jo Brand, animator Nick Park, author/illustrator Raymond Briggs, novelist David Mitchell, actress Katie Leung, illustrator Dave McKean, poet Benjamin Zephaniah, movie producer Jeremy Thomas, filmmaker Julien Temple, poet Simon Armitage, choreographer Akram Khan, zoologist Desmond Morris, actor Antony Sher and director of the Royal Shakespeare Company, Gregory Doran. A short documentary, Carl Randall – London Portraits, was made in conjunction with the project, showing Randall meeting and painting the sitters – each explaining their choice of location in London for the portrait. Prints of this series were displayed at the print room of the National Portrait Gallery, London.

In 2017, Randall created a large monochrome painting depicting Piccadilly Circus, which involved meeting and painting the portraits of over 75 London residents directly from life. In 2018, he painted over 55 portraits in a large oil painting depicting central London's Waterloo Bridge and Thames River area (exhibited at The Royal Academy of Arts Summer Exhibition 2019).

In 2021, Randall was commissioned by Bob Bob Ricard to create a series of four new portrait paintings of restaurateurs or people in the hospitality industry, for their new restaurant located in the Leadenhall Building, the Square Mile. The portraits depict chef & author Pierre Koffmann; food critic for Bloomberg for 25 years Richard Vines; and restaurateurs/businessmen Leonid Shutov and Roman & Mikhail Zelman. The backdrops include the city, the Barbican centre, and 5 Hertford Street Club in Mayfair.

== Recognition ==
As well as the BP Travel Award, he also received first prize in the 1998 RWS/Sunday Times Watercolour Competition, he twice received Second prize in The William Coldstream Painting Competition at The Slade School (1996 & 1997), and was awarded The 2011 Nomura Art Prize by Tokyo University of Arts (for the top PhD graduate exhibition, with his painting 'Roppongi Nightclub' being bought for the University Museum's collection). Scholarships include Daiwa Anglo-Japanese Foundation and MEXT to continue his career as a painter in Tokyo, where he lived for 10 years.

He was selected to be the artist in residence at the 2007 Grand Prix Formula 1 Races in Japan, and was interviewed about his paintings for the CNN programme 'The Japanese Grand Prix: F1 in Japan'. He was also invited to be artist in residence in Hiroshima City, to meet and paint portraits of hibakusha (survivors of the atomic bomb), as part of the exhibition Hiroshima Art Document (the resulting series of portrait drawings now in permanent collection of UCL Art Museum, University College London).

== Other activities ==
Randall has been invited to give talks at UCL Art Museum (University College London), the London Art Fair, Charterhouse School, Cambridge University, the British Council in Tokyo, the National Portrait Gallery, London, the Daiwa Anglo-Japanese Foundation (chaired by the head of undergraduate painting at the Slade School of Fine Art), and at the Swedenborg Society in Bloomsbury – invited by The Japan Society London.

In Tokyo, he was adjunct professor in fine art at Temple University Japan, and painting and drawing tutor at Suidobata Art Academy.

In London, he has been invited to give painting and drawing workshops at Heatherley School of Fine Art, The Art Academy and the Royal Drawing School.

== Exhibitions ==
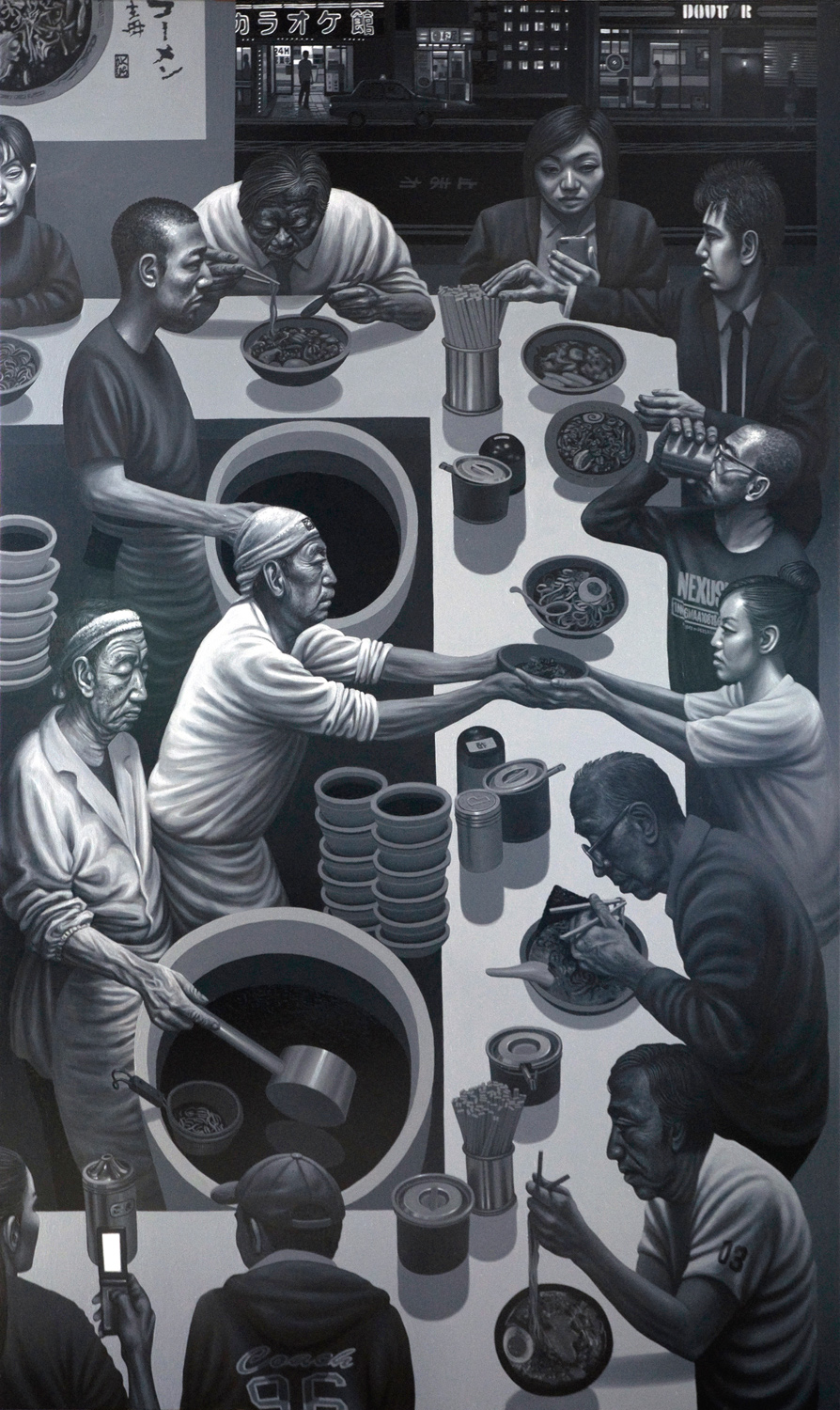
Mr. Kitazawa's Noodle Bar, winner of the 2012 BP Travel Award, at The National Portrait Gallery in London

His works have been exhibited at a number of exhibitions and galleries, including The Herbert Smith Freehills Portrait Award 2024 and also the BP Portrait Awards (2002, 2012, 2013) at The National Portrait Gallery London; the Royal Academy Summer Exhibition (2003, 2009, 2013, 2019), and The Royal Society of Portrait Painters annual exhibition (2012, 2017, 2018, 2020, 2022, 2024) including 'Reassorted' a curated follow-up exhibition of 29 specially selected works by art critic William Feaver. As well as this, he has been invited to take part in 'Small is Beautiful' at Flowers Gallery Cork St. central London for each consecutive year from 2017 to present; The Lynn Painter-Stainers Prize (2017, 2018), ING Discerning Eye 2020, and the Jerwood Drawing Prize 2012.

In 2014, he had two solo exhibitions in central London of work inspired by the people and places of Tokyo: 'Tokyo Portraits' at The Daiwa Anglo-Japanese Foundation (exhibition opened by novelist David Mitchell), and 'Shōzō [肖像]' at Berloni London. In the same year, his solo exhibition 'Portraits from Edo to the Present' was at The Shizuoka City Tokaido Hiroshige Museum of Art in Japan, where his paintings were exhibited alongside Ando Hiroshige's original The Fifty-three Stations of the Tōkaidō woodblock prints (he was also commissioned by the Museum to make a painting for their collection – a contemporary view of Mount Fuji, as depicted in one of Hiroshige's prints). Other exhibitions in Japan include at Tokyo Art Award, Tokyo Metropolitan Museum of Arts, and a solo exhibition at Fuma Contemporary Tokyo, Bunkyo Art. Participation in international art fairs include Art Volta, Basel Switzerland; Art Taipei, Taiwan; Art International Istanbul, Art Osaka and Art Fair Tokyo 2019, Japan.

In 2015, he was commissioned by HRH Prince of Wales to paint a World War Two D-Day Veteran for The Royal Collection, exhibited at The Queens Gallery, Buckingham Palace, Portsmouth Museum, and Holyrood Palace, Edinburgh, Scotland. In 2016, his work was exhibited and auctioned at Christie's New York, and in 2020 Christie's London.

Earlier in his career, he was included in the 2004 group exhibition 'Being Present' at The Jerwood Gallery London, showcasing eight young UK figurative painters who primarily work from life.

== Collections ==
In 2014, his large canvas Tokyo Portrait was bought by Fondation Carmignac in Paris, joining works in the collection by artists such as Andy Warhol, Roy Lichenstein, Jean-Michel Basquait, Keith Haring, Jeff Koons, Gerhard Richter. His paintings are also in The Royal Collection and the Shizuoka City Tokaido Hiroshige Museum of Art, Japan. Fine art prints of his paintings are in the collections of King's College, Cambridge; National Poetry Library at Southbank Centre; Zoological Society of London; Channel 4 News Studios; The National Film and Television School; Akram Khan Dance Company; Curtis Brown Group; Aardman Animation, Bristol; Kent University; Hanway Films; Northern School of Contemporary Dance, Leeds; The Comedy Store; Bar Italia Soho.

== Selected works ==
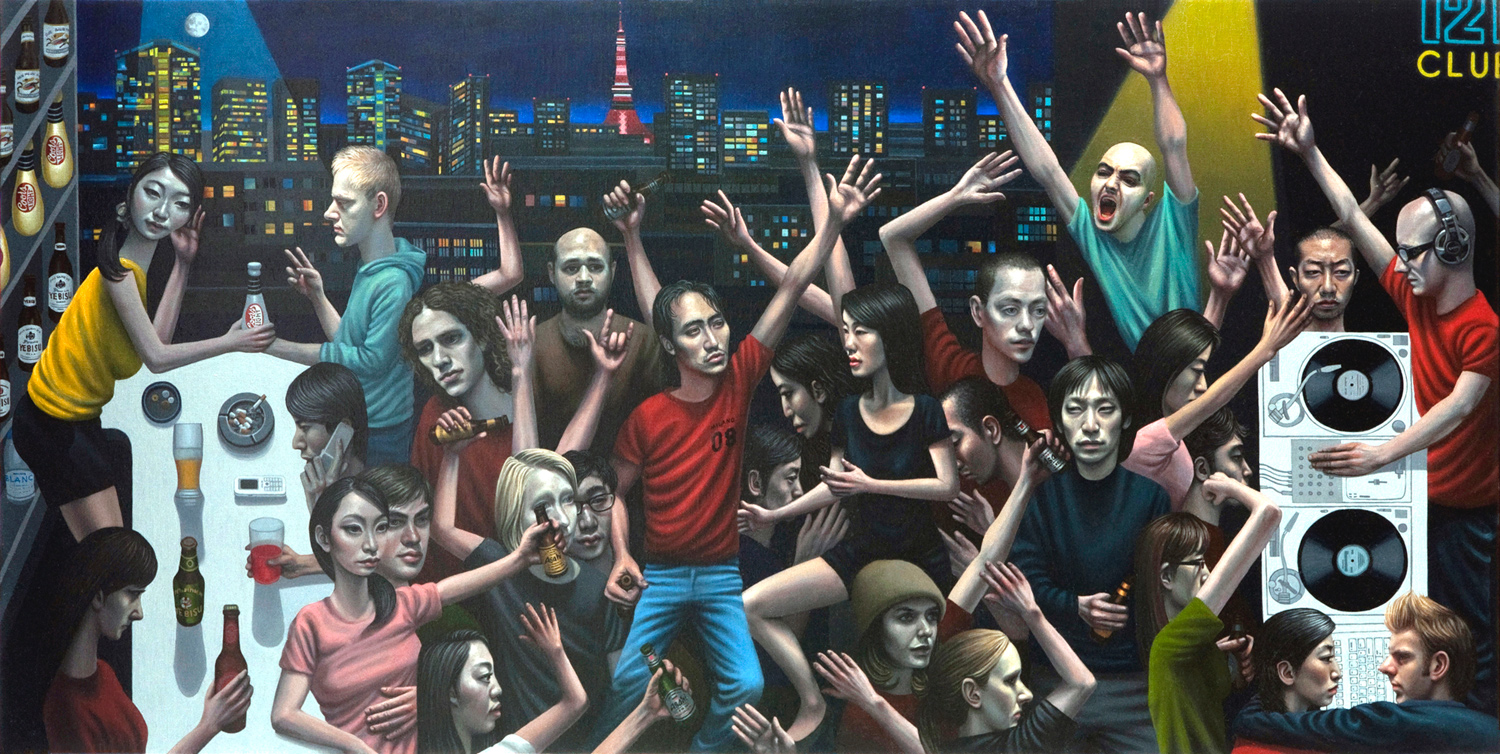
Roppongi Nightclub. Oil on canvas, 65 x 130cm. Winner of The 2011 Nomura Art Prize, Tokyo. Collection of Tokyo Geidai Museum, Japan.

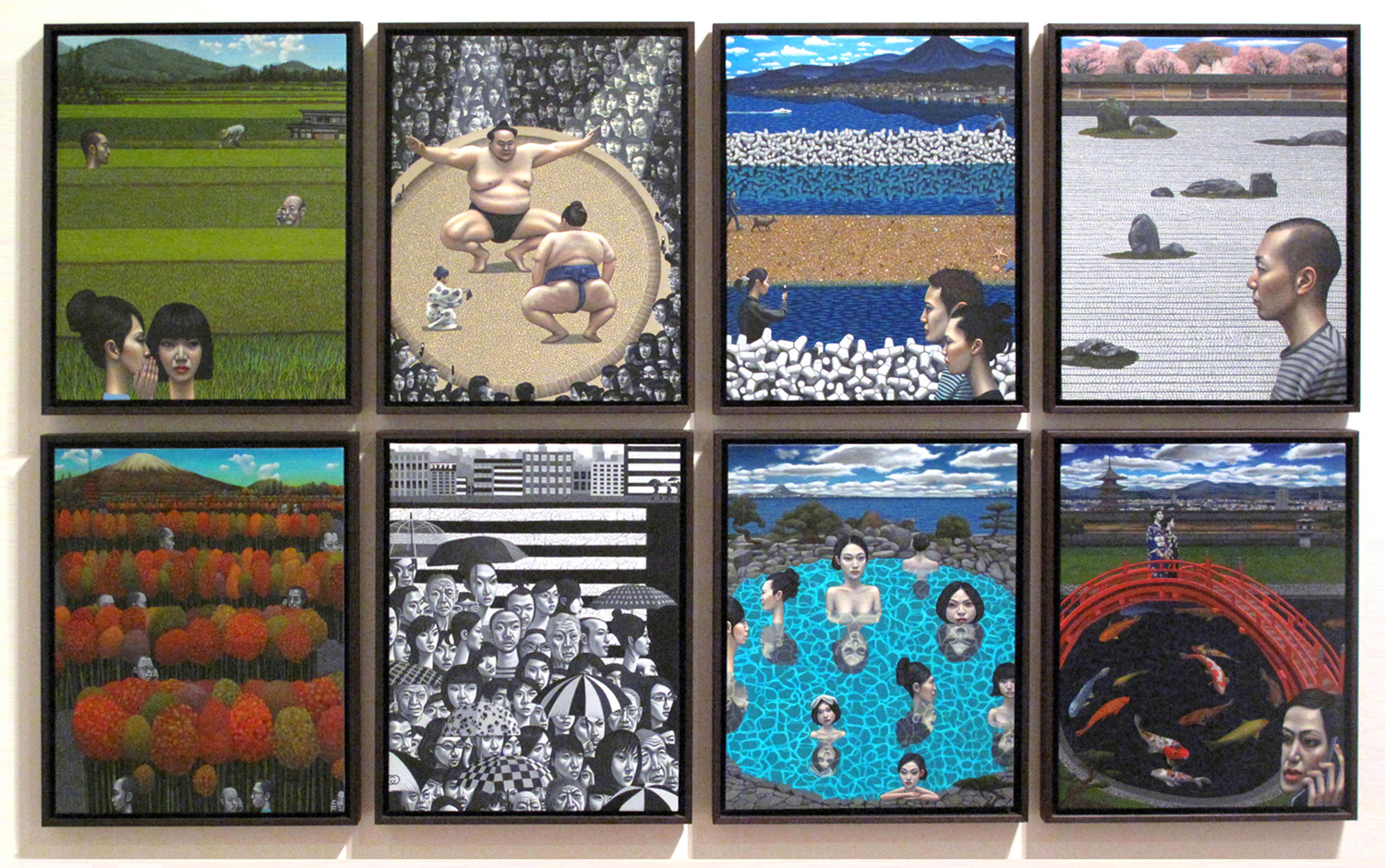
Tokaido Highway Paintings. Oil on canvas, 42 x 30cm each. BP Travel Award work 2013. Exhibited at The National Portrait Gallery London.

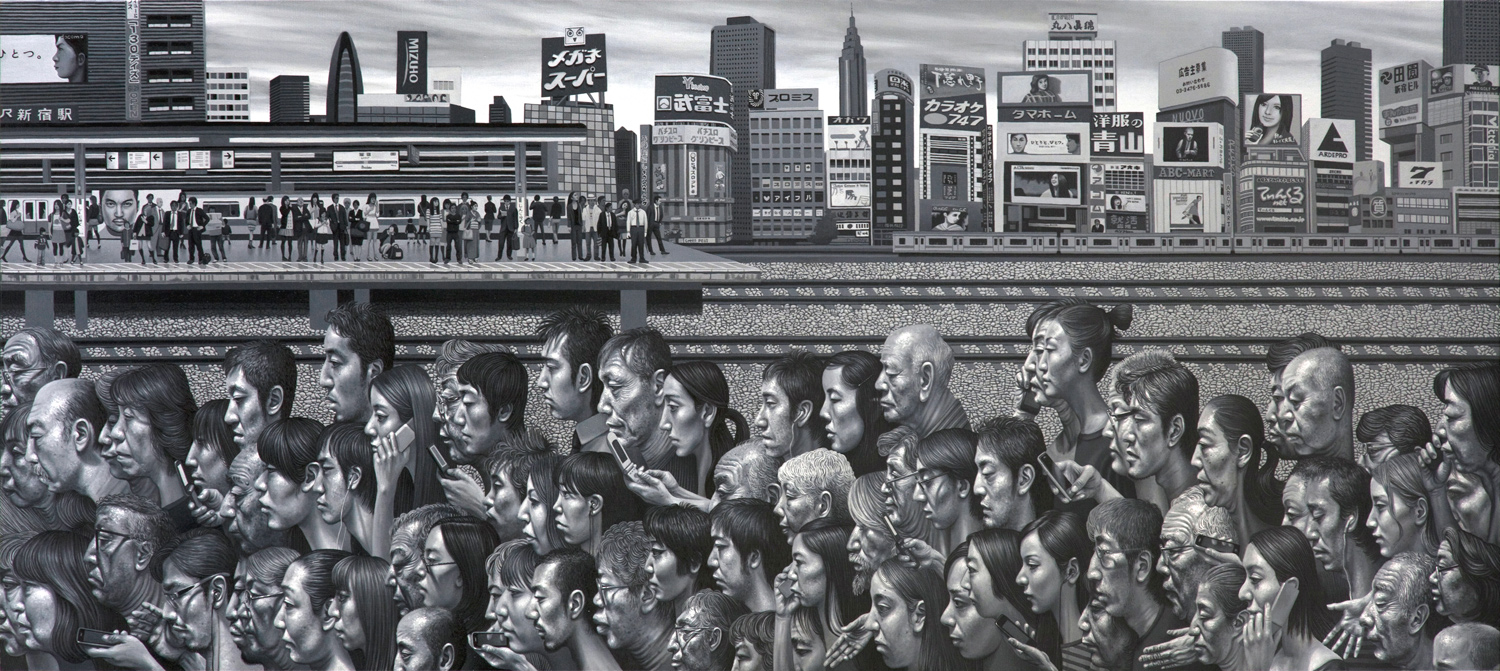
Shinjuku. Oil on canvas, 100 x 230cm. Exhibited at The National Portrait Gallery London 2013.

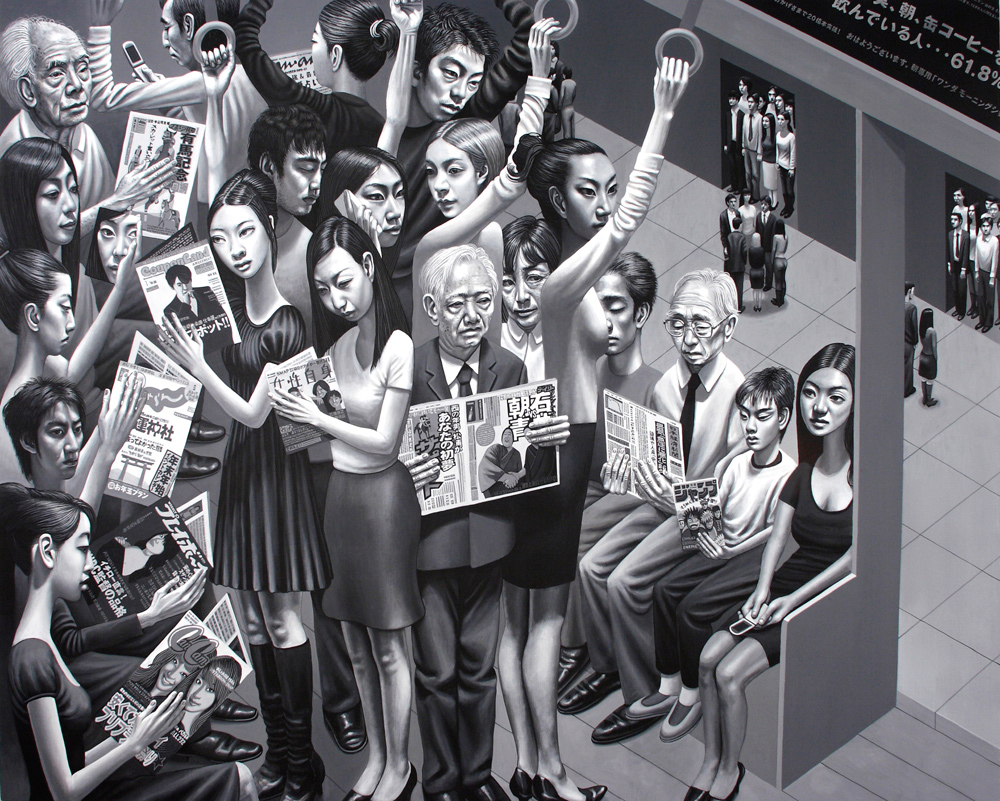
Tokyo Subway. Oil on canvas, 130 x 162cm. Exhibited at The 2013 RA Summer Exhibition, The Royal Academy of Arts, London.

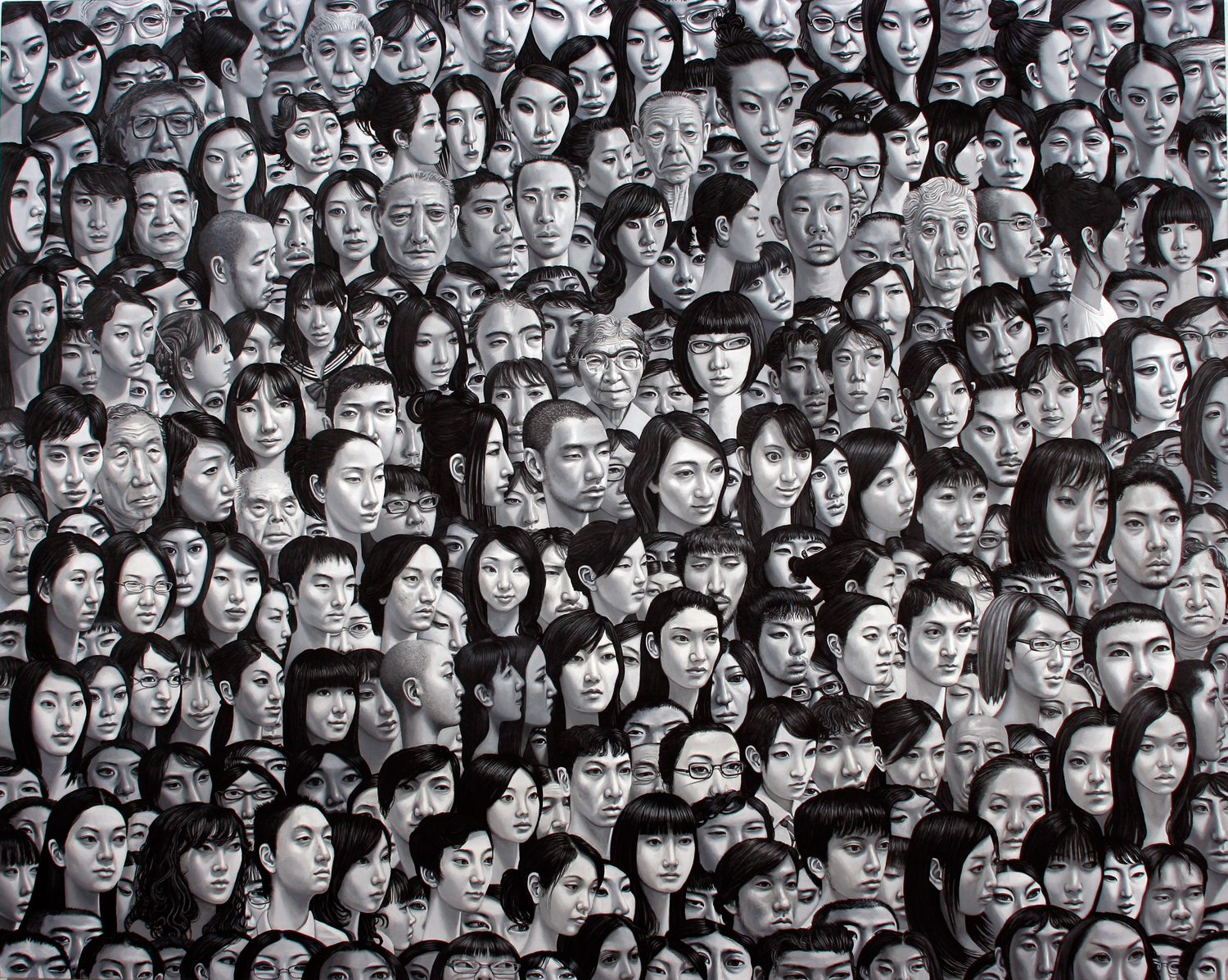
Tokyo Portrait. Acrylic on canvas, 182 x 227cm. Collection of Fondation Carmignac, Paris France.

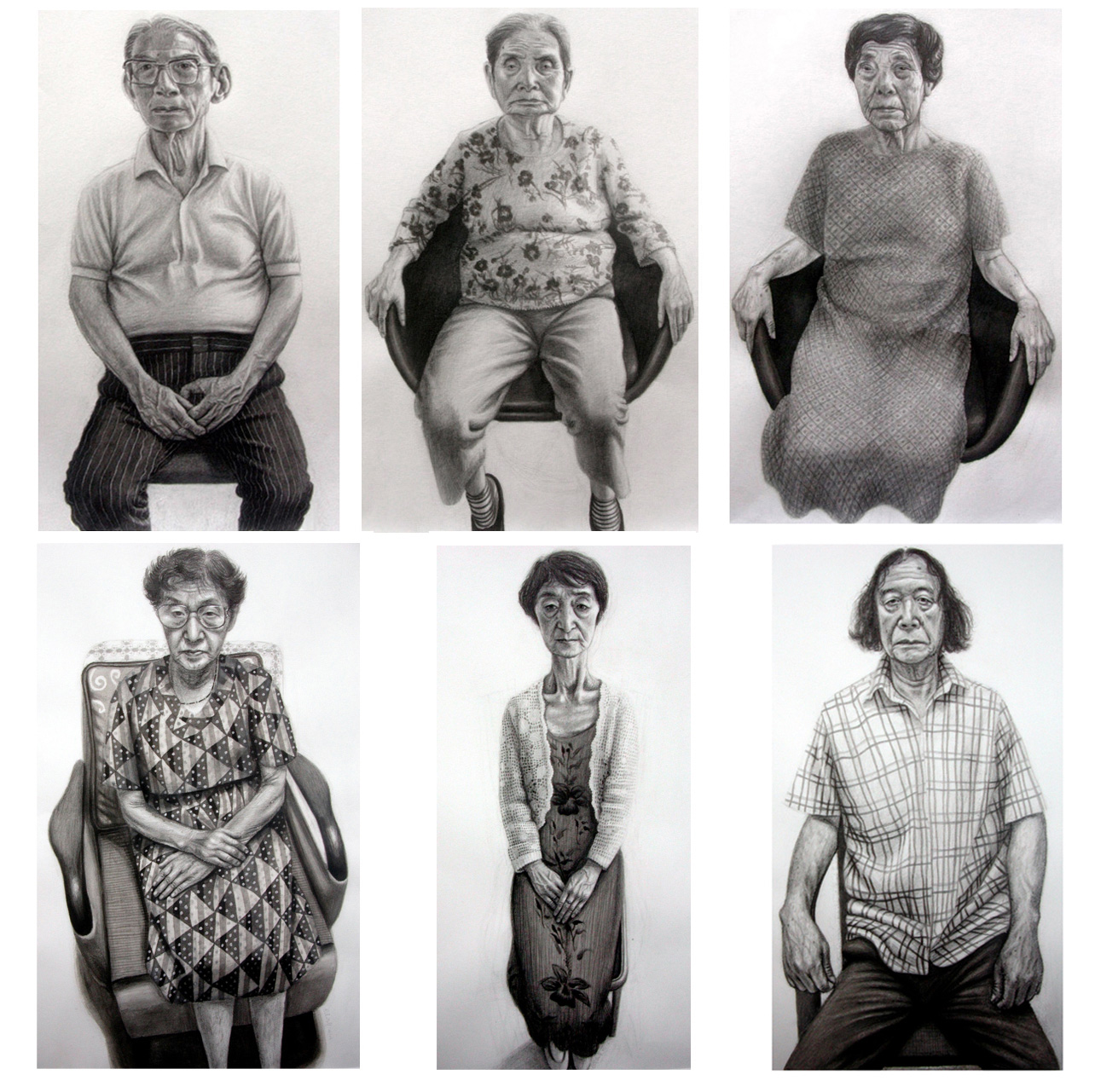
Hibakusha Portraits (Survivors of the Atomic Bomb, Hiroshima). Pencil and ink on paper, 35 x 50cm each. Collection of University College London Museum.

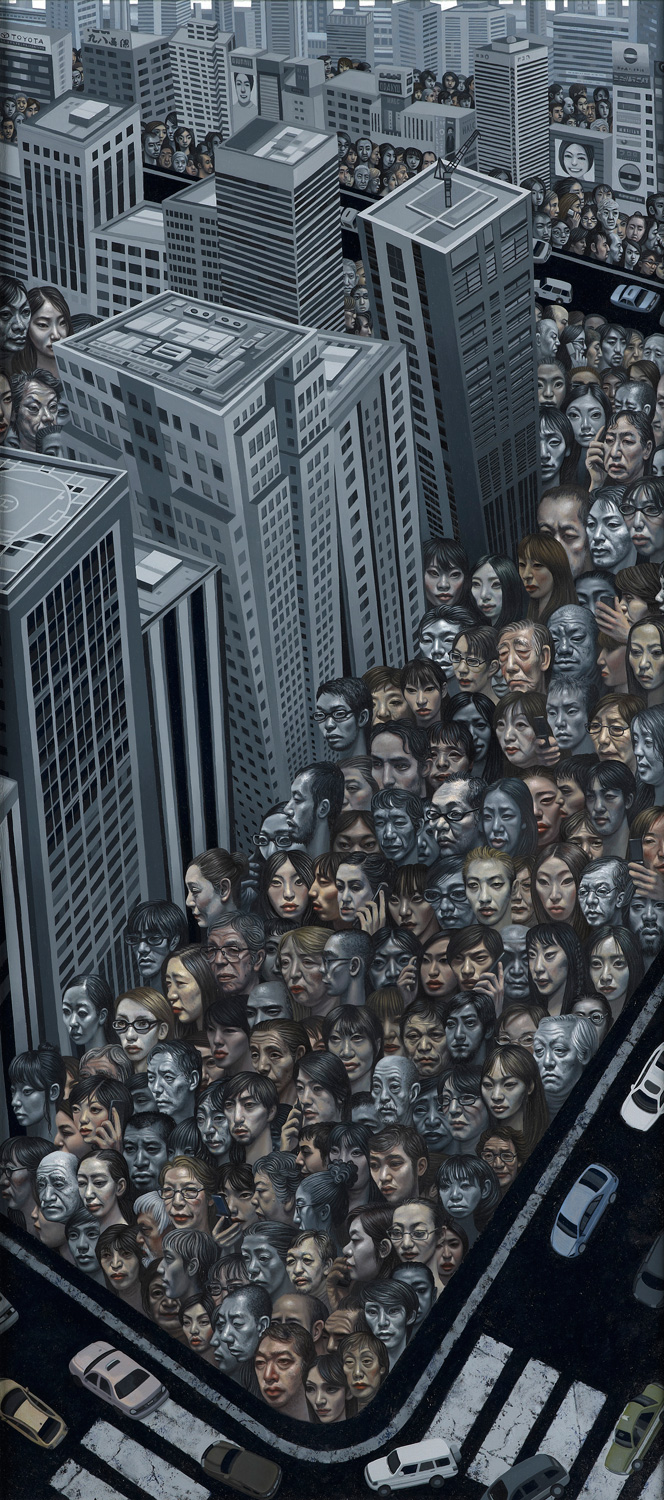
Tokyo. Oil on canvas, 65 x 150cm.

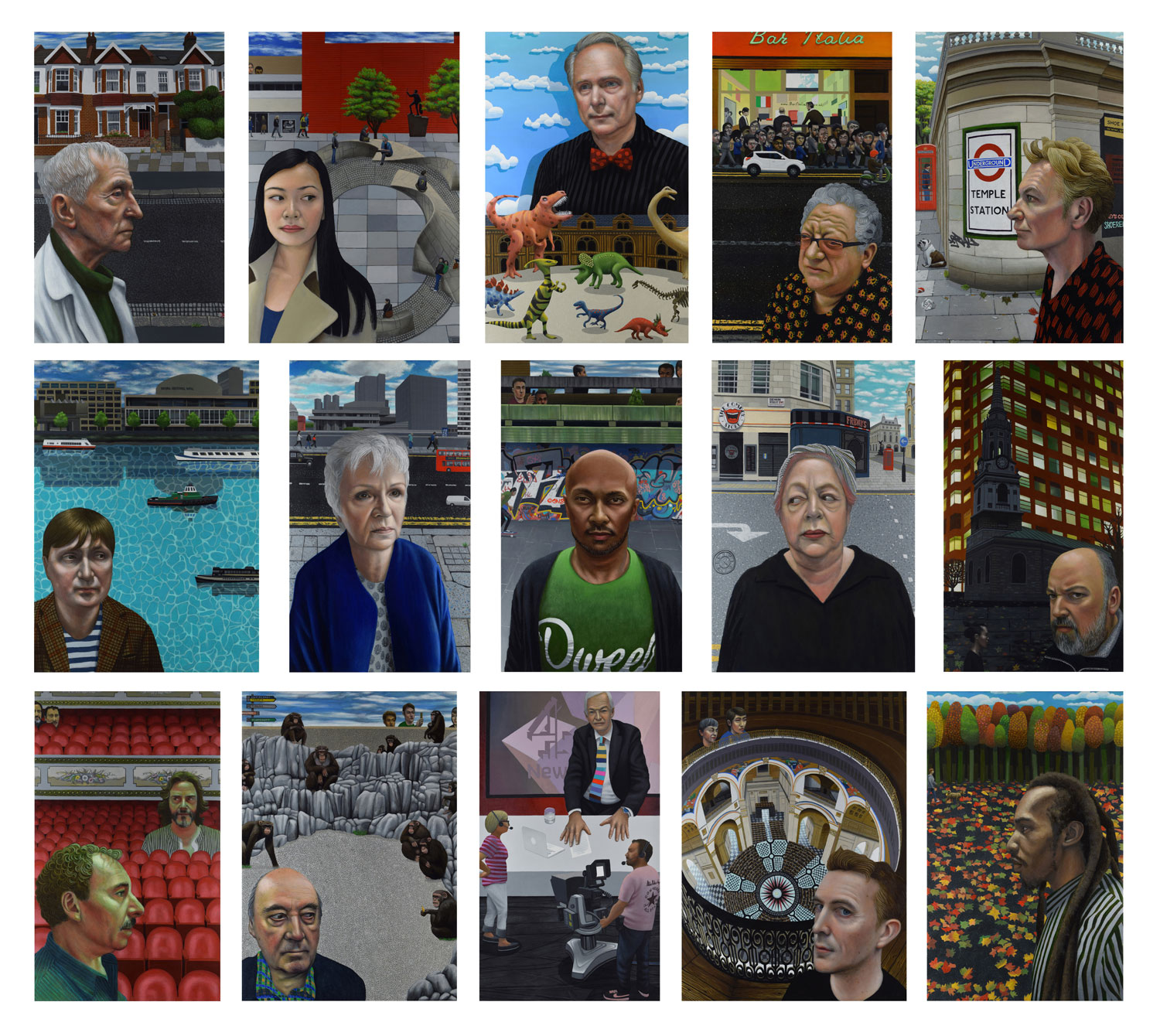
London Portraits. Oil on canvas, 30 x 42cm each (15 panels), 2014-16.

== Books ==
- Carl Randall – Japan Portraits (2013) ISBN 978-0-9926089-0-3
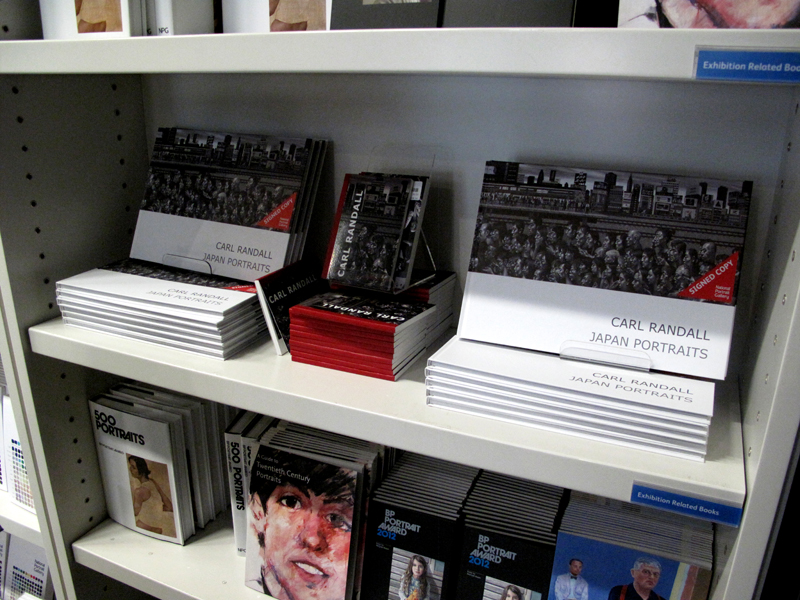
Signed copies of Japan Portraits at The National Portrait Gallery, London, July 2013

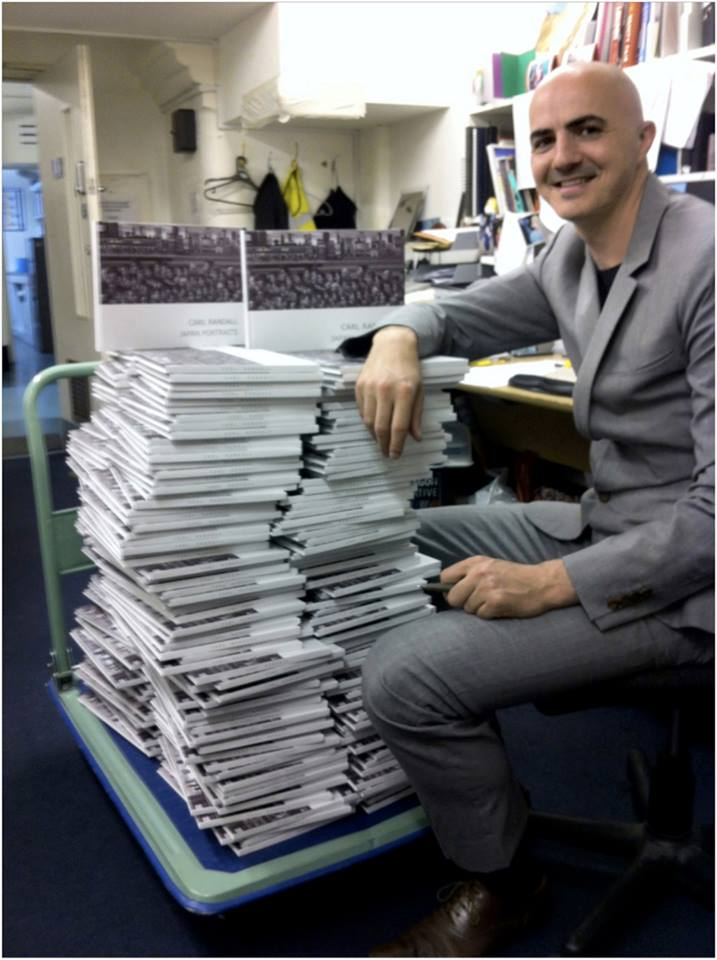
Carl Randall signing copies of Japan Portraits, at The National Portrait Gallery, London, July 2013
