= Gallery Climate Coalition =

Gallery Climate Coalition (GCC) is a non-profit arts membership organisation. It creates free resources and leads campaigns to encourage environmental responsibility in the art world.

== History ==
The Gallery Climate Coalition was established in 2020 to address the carbon footprint of the international art market. It campaigns for the art sector to reduce its CO2e emissions by a minimum of 50% by 2030, as well as promoting zero waste. Founding parties include: Thomas Dane Gallery, Kate MacGarry, Lisson Gallery's Greg Hilty, Sadie Coles, Frieze Art Fair co-founder Matthew Slotover and director Victoria Siddall.

In 2025, it claimed to have 1800 members and described its goals as being in alignment with the Paris Accord. It is part of greater efforts across the art world to reduce climate emissions but is focused on the commercial art world. In the same year, Frances Morris, the former head of the Tate Modern was named the Coalition's inaugural chair.

Gallery Climate Coalition opened volunteer branches in cities including Berlin and New York, but revised its structure in 2024 to close all chapters except for its London headquarters. In 2026, it announced the launch of a new consultancy called Climate Action Services International (Casi). Its services include carbon auditing, decarbonisation strategies, governance advice and staff training.
