= Thomas Dane Gallery =

Thomas Dane Gallery is a contemporary art gallery founded in 2004. It has two spaces in London, UK, on 3 Duke Street and 11 Duke Street, and a third space in Naples, Italy.

The gallery is noted for its focus on moving image and film art, as well as introducing prominent international mid-generation artists to UK audiences. It represents significant contemporary artists and estates, including Steve McQueen, John Gerrard, Akram Zaatari, Paul Pfeiffer and Bruce Conner.

== History ==
Gallerist Thomas Dane opened the gallery in April 2004 with François Chantala and Martine d’Anglejan-Chatillon, who later became partners in the business. Its inaugural exhibition presented art by Steve McQueen. In October of the same year, it followed with Paul Pfeiffer's first solo show in the UK.

The gallery was founded at 11 Duke Street, St. James's in London and extended to a second space in 2011 at 3 Duke Street St. James's. In 2018, the gallery opened a new gallery space and residency in Naples, Italy. Other exhibitions have included the first UK solo shows of Albert Oehlen, Jorge Queiroz, Jose Damasceno, Jean-Luc Moulene, Glenn Ligon, Arturo Herrera, Luisa Lambri, Michel Francois, Abraham Cruzvillegas, Walead Beshty, Lynda Benglis, Terry Adkins, Kelley Walker.

The gallery participates in art fairs including Art Basel in Basel and Hong Kong, and Frieze Art Fair and Frieze Masters.

Dane began his career by studying 17th-century Spanish art, the Italian Renaissance, and the Surrealist painter and muralist John Armstrong who was a family member. Other career moments for Dane included helping to organise Damien Hirst’s show ‘In and Out of Love’ in 1991; founding the art-book publisher Ridinghouse with fellow art dealer Karsten Schubert in 1995; and helping to establish the Moving Image Fund in 2010, a project to support fundraising efforts by institutions to collect film.
