= John Gorham (graphic designer) =

British graphic designer (1937–2001)

John Gorham (May 31, 1937, in Uxbridge, Middlesex – June 7, 2001, in Guildford, Surrey) was a British graphic designer, who gained renown within the industry through a variety of successful projects including film posters, postage stamps and book covers. He was given the D&AD President's Award in 1993 in recognition of a lifetime's contribution to British design.

Among John Gorham's stamp designs were the British 1990 Christmas issue, the 1991 Wintertime set, two 1995 stamps celebrating the 50th anniversary of the end of the Second World War and the 1990 issue to celebrate the 90th Birthday of Queen Elizabeth the Queen Mother. A modified version of the Queen Mother set was issued as Commemoration after her death in 2002.
