= Vasco Bendini =

Italian informalist painter (1922–2015)

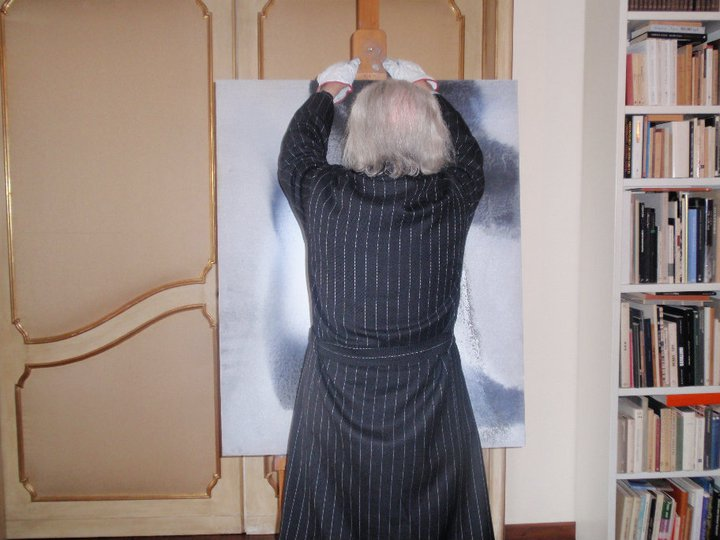
- Vasco Bendini at work
- Born: 27 February 1922; Bologna, Italy
- Died: 31 January 2015 (aged 92)

Vasco Bendini (27 February 1922 – 31 January 2015) was an Italian informalist painter.

== Life and career ==
Born in Bologna, Bendini studied at the Bologna Academy of Fine Arts, under Giorgio Morandi and Virgilio Guidi. In 1956 he was invited to show his work at the 27th edition of the Venice Biennale. This was followed by two more participations, each time with a solo presentation of his work, in 1964 and 1972.

After a period close to informalism, especially to the "last naturalism" theorized by Francesco Arcangeli, Bendini expanded his visual language to other forms, including Neo-Dada, Arte Povera and conceptual phases. In the late 1970s he eventually re-embraced an Informalist style in his paintings.
