= Jack Smith (artist) =

British artist

- Born: 18 June 1928; Sheffield, United Kingdom
- Died: 11 June 2011 (aged 82); Hove, United Kingdom
- Education: Sheffield College of Art, Saint Martin's School of Art, Royal College of Art
- Known for: painting
- Movement: Neo-realism, Abstract art

Jack Smith (18 June 1928 – 11 June 2011) was a British realist and, later, abstract artist.

== Life ==
Jack Smith was born in 1928 in Sheffield, Yorkshire.

Smith studied at Sheffield College of Art (1944–1946), Saint Martin's School of Art (1948–1950) and the Royal College of Art (1950–1953). At the RCA, Smith studied under John Minton, Ruskin Spear and Carel Weight.

== Work ==
During the 1950s, Smith's early work was in a neo-realist style known as "The Kitchen Sink School" featuring domestic subjects.

In the 1960s, Smith abandoned realism and adopted a brightly coloured, abstract style comparable to those of Wassily Kandinsky and Piet Mondrian incorporating Constructivism and Biomorphism with elements of hieroglyphic and musical notation. Smith continued to develop and work in this style and did not return to realism.

== Recognition ==
- First prize at the first John Moores Liverpool Exhibition (1956)
- Shown at Venice Biennale (1956)
- Retrospective at the Whitechapel Art Gallery (1959)
- National Prize at Guggenheim International Awards
- Touring Retrospective organised by Sunderland Arts Centre (1977)
- 80th Birthday Retrospective at the Flowers East gallery (2008)
- The National Portrait Gallery, London held an exhibition of his work, 'Jack Smith: Abstract Portraits' (2015) and holds several portraits of him in its collection.
