= Alexis Harding =

British artist (born 1973)

Alexis Harding (born 1973) is a British artist. Harding was born in London. He studied fine art at Goldsmiths' College from 1992 to 1995. In 1996, Harding's work was included in the New Contemporaries exhibition at Tate Liverpool and Camden Arts Centre. He won the John Moores Painting Prize in 2004 with his work Slump/Fear (orange/black). He was selected by a jury that included Jarvis Cocker, Gavin Turk and former John Moores prizewinner Callum Innes. The same year he had a solo exhibition at Andrew Mummery Gallery. In 2011, Harding exhibited a solo show at Rubicon Gallery, Dublin. Harding was himself a member of the jury for the John Moores Prize in 2023 alongside The White Pube, Chila Kumari Burman, Marlene Smith and Yu Hong. Harding exhibited a career retrospective at Palazzo Lombardia in 2024, entitled Alexis Harding: 20 years 20 seconds.. He is represented by Luca Tommasi Arte Contemporanea in Milan.

Slump/Fear (orange/black) was described by Laura Gascoigne in The Spectator as "a messy outburst against the pattern-making impulse, spoiling a surface of perfect checks with an ugly tear". His works were called simply "gloopy abstracts" by Rose Jennings in The Observer. Barry Schwabsky wrote for Artforum that the titles of Harding's paintings "give a pretty clear idea of the results", citing Slump/Fear, Ruinart, Collision and Collapsed Painting as examples.

Writing for The Times, Catherine Leen described Harding's signature style as resulting from a technique of pouring household gloss paint onto wet oil pigment through a perforated guttering. The artist then further manipulates the paint, or allows it to slide, often then hanging the painting while it is still wet. Schwabsky described the resulting effect as a "puckering and warping" of the painting's surface, with the effects of gravity sometimes leading to the paint sliding off its support and hanging like rags. Paint can then puddle below the work "if the painting's hung fresh enough". According to Leen, Harding's style prompts questions about "the tension between chance and control in artistic practice".

This style was subject of a paper in Microchemical Journal, "Chemistry of modern paint media: The strained and collapsed painting by Alexis Harding". It explains that a key part of his practice is the "chemical incompatibility" of the different paints used. The paper investigated Harding's 2003 work Quartet, prepared with heavy linseed oil and oil paint. Harding's intention was to create a dried film over which paint could sag and glide over a period of six months. The paint continued to move after this period, and in 2014 the painting surface was still sticky. The paper's authors conclude that while the materials used may appear similar, mixing them without proper consideration of their different properties leads to a fragility of the artwork, causing conservation issues and the instability of the paint in the long term.
