= Dan Hays (artist) =

British artist (born 1966)

Dan Hays (born 1966) is a British artist. He has won the John Moores Painting Prize, holds a PhD in Fine Art from Kingston University, and is an Associate Lecturer at Central Saint Martins.

His work has been described as a reflection on painting itself, intentionally referencing other artists. Hays characterises his work since the late 1990s as exploring the relationship between the digital world and the "tactile, flawed and time-consuming medium of painting".

== Life and career ==
Hays was born in London in 1966, and studied fine art at Goldsmiths College from 1987 to 1990.

Hays won the £20,000 John Moores Painting Prize in 1997 with his work Harmony In Green, a depiction of a hamster cage exactly his height. Hays has said that the painting is the result of his early obsessions with op art and M. C. Escher. As part of the prize, the piece was purchased by Liverpool's Walker Art Gallery. His work is also held by the Saatchi Collection.

In 2012, Hays completed a PhD in Fine Art at Kingston University. He is an Associate Lecturer at Central Saint Martins.

Hays' work has featured in group shows exhibited at galleries including Turner Contemporary (2016), Camden Arts Centre (2012), and in an Arts Council new purchases tour (1996–1997). He has exhibited solo shows at venues including Void Gallery (2007), and Manchester Art Gallery (2006).

== Style ==
Michael Archer, writing for Artforum in 1998, said that while Hays' work depicts mundane details of ordinary life, such as cages for pets, these subjects are better viewed as a way of reflecting on painting itself. Archer found that Hays' work intentionally references Gerhard Richter, David Hockney (recalling Hockney's struggle with representing water through various painterly techniques), and Bridget Riley. He believed that titles like Harmony in Green and Harmony in Pink suggest a particular interest in the play of light and its reflection.

Hays says that since the late 1990s his work has focused on "the relationship between the intangible, encoded and instantaneous realm of digital technology, and the tactile, flawed and time-consuming medium of painting". Works in his 2006 exhibition at Manchester Art Gallery, Colorado Impressions, used painting to reproduce digital artefacts like pixellation and the effect of a low-resolution JPEG file. According to Hays, this exhibition's paintings are based on images found online on the blog of another person named Dan Hays, based in Colorado.
