= Michael Simpson (painter) =

British painter (born 1940)

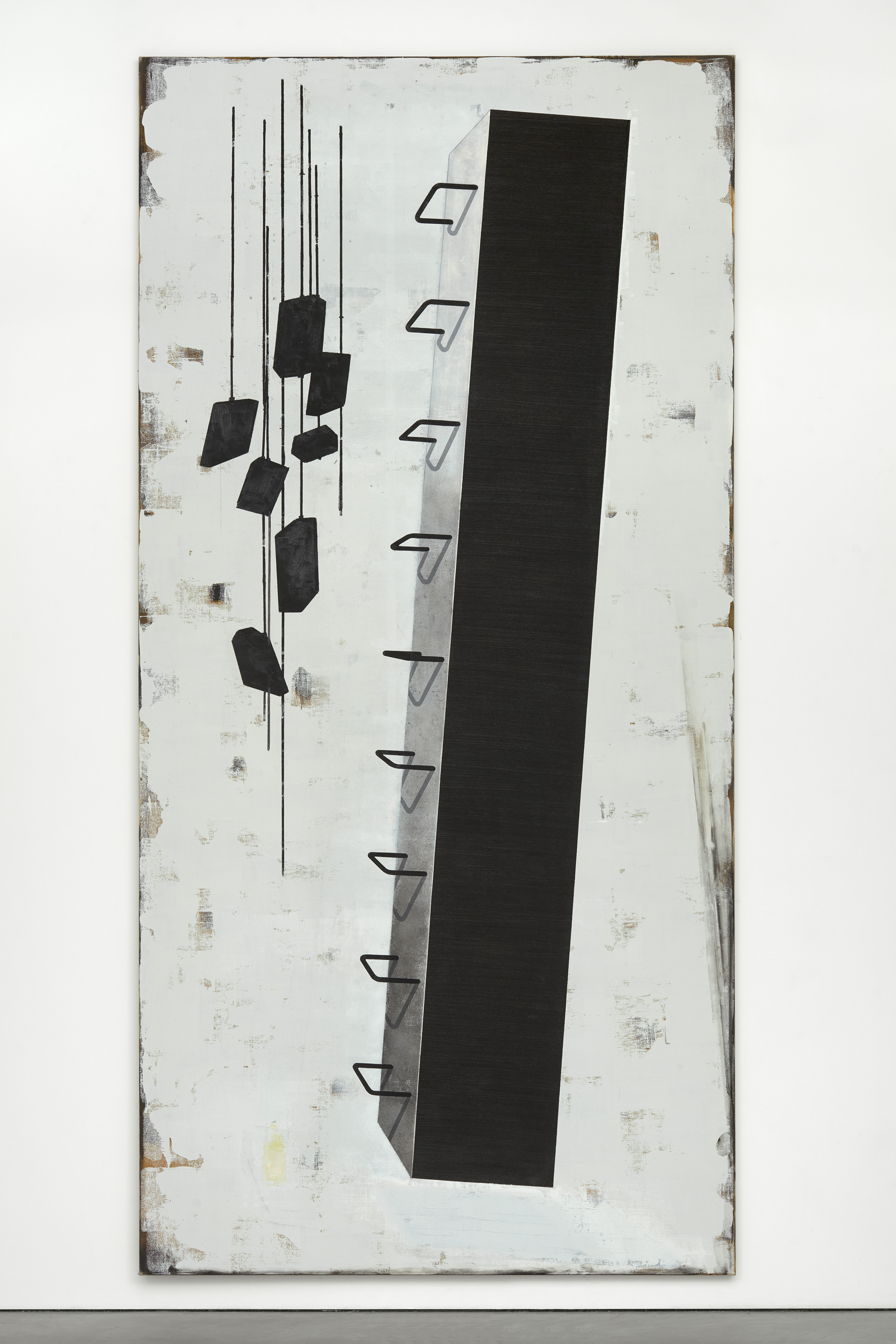
- Reader, 2023, oil on canvas, 382 x 183 cm.
- Born: 1940 (age 85–86); Dorset
- Education: Arts University Bournemouth, Royal College of Art
- Known for: Painter
- Awards: John Moores Painting Prize

Michael Simpson (born 1940) is a British painter. Simpson has had major solo shows at the Serpentine (1985), the Arnolfini (1983, 1996), Spike Island (2016), BlainSouthern (2017) and Modern Art (2024, 2025), and in 2016 won the John Moores Painting Prize for his painting Squint (19).

== Overview ==
Born in Dorset to Anglo-Russian parents, he attended Bournemouth College of Art (1958–60) and the Royal College of Art (1960–63). Simpson is known large-scale paintings, primarily his ongoing series of Benches, Leper Squints, and Confessionals. Simpson's influences include early Flemish painting, and his work is characterised by a minimal palette and formal restraint. He describes his approach to painting as a "deceptive force of the constructed image."

Barry Schwabsky has described Simpson's 'allegiance to a conception more readily associated with abstraction than with painting that employs images'. He goes on to describe the artist's preoccupation with "the idea that painting is not a kind of imaginary opening in the wall through which we get an illusory view of another world, but rather a physical thing that is made, whose flat surface confronts the viewer with a presence that demands engagement."

Simpson has lectured in several British Art Schools and Universities and featured in various documentaries, including "Odyssey of a Painter" (Louisiana Channel Documentary).

"I believe a painting must move beyond its subject, and formal considerations are paramount in my work. I try to 'build' a painting, and by putting its elements together in a certain way, I hope to find those critical relationships which will give the object its brevity and coherence. Like an unpredictable marriage, this challenging process between abstract principles and the subject's subliminal forces remains the essence of the practice". – Michael Simpson, November 2023

He is represented by Modern Art, London.

== Artist Biography ==
Painting almost daily for over six decades, Michael Simpson is renowned for his large-scale paintings that repeatedly work through a limited number of motifs. Influenced by fifteenth century Venetian and early Flemish painting, Simpson’s visual vocabulary returns again and again to a belief in “the infamy of religious history”, in his words. These motifs that potently address faith, existentialism and authority - benches, steps and ladders, pulpits, Islamic minbars, and confessional boxes - are the foundational forms of his precise pared down compositions. These structures are rendered with a forensic level of detail, but in such a way that they also become pure forms: benches levitate on an empty plane; ladders lead to nowhere. Simpson’s paintings are characterised by his potent economy and austerity, as well as a marked depth in spatial perspective; their subjects painted on a flat painted surface. But despite their austerity and simplicity, each of Simpson’s paintings contains an elaborate consideration of a specific history. In his Leper Squint series, for example, what might first appear to be a recurring reference to the black square of Kazimir Malevich, is in fact a poignant depiction of a hagioscope, or a ‘squint’; a small hole positioned in the exterior walls of medieval churches for the purpose of allowing lepers to see and hear the sacraments without contaminating the congregation. In another example, Simpson’s ongoing bench paintings, which he started painting in 1989, are an homage to the Italian Renaissance philosopher Giordano Bruno, who was burnt alive in 1600 for heresy.

Michael Simpson was born in Dorset in 1940 and lives and works in Wiltshire. Simpson has presented solo exhibitions at Modern Art, London (2025; 2024); Holburne Museum, Bath (2023); giant, Bournemouth (2022); Minsheng Museum of Art, Shanghai (2018); Spike Island, Bristol (2016); David Roberts Arts Foundation, London (2014); Arnolfini Gallery, Bristol (1996 and 1983); and Serpentine Gallery, London (1985). He has participated in group exhibitions at Louisiana Museum of Modern Art, Humlebaek (2021); Hayward Gallery, London (2019); Museum Moderner, Künst, Stiftung, Ludwig, Wein, Vienna (2018); Limerick City Gallery of Art (2017); Walker Art Gallery, Liverpool; Contemporary Art Centre, Vilnius, Lithuania (both 2016); Fitzwilliam Museum, Cambridge (1999); and Serpentine Gallery, London (1987). In 2016, he was awarded the John Moores Painting Prize, having first been nominated for the prize in 1991. His works feature in prominent institutional collections including British Council, London; Roberts Institute of Art, London; Long Museum, Shanghai; Louisiana Museum of Modern Art, Humlebaek; Tate, London; and Walker Art Gallery, Liverpool.

== Solo Exhibitions ==
- Drawing towards Painting: Selected Works 1974–2024, American Art Catalogues, New York, NY, USA, 2025
- Drawing towards Painting: Selected Works 1974–2024, Modern Art, London, 2025
- New Paintings, Modern Art, London, 2024
- Drawing Towards Painting, Holburne Museum, Bath, 2023
- Paintings, Arario Gallery, Shanghai, China, 2023
- Paintings, GIANT, Bournemouth, 2022
- Nosbaum Reding, Luxembourg, 2021
- New Paintings, Blain Southern, London, 2019
- Selected Works of Michael Simpson, Minsheng Museum of Art, Shanghai, China, 2018
- Squint, Blain Southern, Berlin, Germany, 2017
- Flat Surface Painting, David Risley Gallery, Copenhagen, Denmark, 2016
- Flat Surface Painting, Spike Island, Bristol, 2016
- Study #6, David Roberts Arts Foundation, London, 2014
- The Leper Squint Paintings, David Risley Gallery, Copenhagen, Denmark, 2013
- Bench Paintings, Recent Work 2005 – 2006, David Risley Gallery, London, 2007
- Hymn . Psalm . Song . Prayer - Bench Paintings, The Tithe Barn and The Old Gasworks, Bradford on Avon, 2005
- Bench Paintings 1992-1995, Arnolfini Gallery, Bristol, travelling to: Oriel 31, Newtown, 1996
- Recent Paintings, Serpentine Gallery, London, 1985
- Paintings 1980-1983, Arnolfini Gallery, Bristol, 1983
- Six large paintings, Bristol Museum & Art Gallery, Bristol, 1973
- Paintings and Drawings, Piccadilly Gallery, London, 1972
- Paintings, University of Sussex, Sussex, 1968
- Michael Simpson, Piccadilly Gallery, London, 1968
- Paintings and Drawings, Piccadilly Gallery, London, 1964

== Selected collections ==
- Arts Council, England
- Arts Council, Northern Ireland
- British Council, London
- Bristol Museum and Art Gallery, Bristol
- Camden Borough Council, London
- Carlisle Art Gallery and Museum, Carlisle
- Control Techniques, The Arup Building
- Det Nye Universitets Hospital, Aarhus, Jutland
- Ekard Collection Wassenaar, Holland
- He Art Museum (HEM), Foshan, China
- Kistefos Museum of Contemporary Art, Norway
- Lim Collection, Hong Kong
- Long Museum, Shanghai, China
- Louisiana Museum of Modern Art, Denmark
- Majerus Collection, Luxembourg
- Roberts Institute of Art, London
- Royal College of Art, London
- Schürmann Collection, Aachen, Germany
- Start Museum, Shanghai, China
- Tate, London
- TiA Collection, NM, USA
- Ulster Museum and Art Gallery, Belfast
- University of Oxford, Oxford
- Walker Art Gallery, Liverpool

== Selected Publications ==
- 101 Drawings: Selected Works 1974–2024, New York, NY: American Art Catalogues/London: Modern Art (2025)
- Michael Simpson, London: Modern Art (2024)
- Burnett, Craig and Fletcher, Jess (eds.), Michael Simpson Paintings and Drawings 1989 — 2019, London: Blain Southern (2019)
- Flat Surface Painting, Bristol: Spike Island (2016)
- Hymn-Psalm-Song-Prayer - Bench Paintings (2005)
- Bench Paintings 1992-1995, Bristol: Arnolfini Gallery and Newtown: Oriel 31 (1993)

== Awards ==
- First Prize, John Moores Prize (2016)
- London Arts Foundation Fellowship in Painting (1999)
- Prize Winner, John Moores 17 (1991)
- First Prize, Tolly Cobbald Open, Cambridge (1977)
- Major Award, Arts Council of Great Britain (1976)
- Major Award, Southern Arts Council (1975)
- Joint First Prize, 1968 Open Painting Exhibition, The Arts Council Gallery, Belfast (1968)
- British Council Scholarship to the USSR (1963)
- First Prize, London Evening Standard Open (1963)
- First Prize, University of London Exhibition (1960)
