= David Leapman =

English painter

David Leapman (born 1959) is an English painter, who won the John Moores Painting Prize in 1995.

== Biography ==
Leapman studied in London at St Martin's School of Art, Goldsmiths College and Chelsea College of Art.

His work often uses unusual materials, as well as strong and vibrant colours.

In 1995 Leapman won the John Moores Painting Prize 19, with his acrylic painting Double-Tongued Knowability, and won a prize at the following exhibition in 1997. He was selected to take part in the Jerwood Drawing Prize exhibition in 2006.

He has paintings and drawings in the permanent collections of the Victoria and Albert Museum, the British Government Art Collection and Walker Art Gallery amongst others.

Leapman moved to Riverside, California in 2007, where he runs a gallery called Contemporary Artist Space (CAS) from his own home.
