= Palazzo Montani Antaldi, Pesaro =

The Palazzo Montani Antaldi is a Neoclassical-style palace located on Via Passeri #72 in the city of Pesaro, region of the Marche, Italy.

== History ==
A palace at the site was begun in the 16th century, but the present layout was mainly established during 1777–1785 by designs by Tommaso Bicciaglia who was working for the Montani family. The palace then passed on to the Antaldi family from 1808 to 1858. Subsequent owners included the families of the Meli (1859), Pompucci (1882), and Santini (1947). By the latter date, the palace had fallen in need of repair, and it would be later purchased by the Cassa di Risparmio di Pesaro, who performed a restoration between 1986 and 1991.

The interior courtyard was adapted to form a large auditorium. The Piano nobile has frescoes (1777–1781) depicting stories of the Aenid by Carlo Paolucci and Placido Lazzarini, followers of Giovanni Andrea Lazzarini. In 2005, the Cassa di Risparmio inaugurated a display of its art and artifact collections, including paintings, maps, and ceramics.
