= Lisa Milroy =

Canadian artist (born 1959)

- Born: Lisa Milroy; 16 January 1959 (age 67); Vancouver, British Columbia
- Education: Paris-Sorbonne University (1977–1978); Saint Martins School of Art (1978–1979); Goldsmiths College, University of London (1979–1982)
- Known for: Painter
- Awards: John Moores Painting Prize (1989); Royal Academician (2005)

Lisa Milroy (born 16 January 1959 in Vancouver, British Columbia) is an Anglo-Canadian artist known for her still life paintings of everyday objects. In the 1980s, Milroy’s paintings featured ordinary objects depicted against an off-white background. Subsequently her imagery expanded, which led to a number of different series including landscapes, buildings and portraits. As her approaches to still life diversified, so did her manner of painting, giving rise to a range of stylistic innovations. Throughout her practice, Milroy has been fascinated by the relation between stillness and movement, and the nature of making and looking at painting.

In 1977, aged 18, Milroy travelled to Paris and studied at the Paris-Sorbonne University. In 1978, she moved to London for a foundation course at Saint Martin's School of Art and gained her BFA at Goldsmiths College, University of London in 1982. Her first solo exhibition in 1984 was based on still life. In 1989, she won the John Moores Painting Prize. Milroy has taught at the Slade School of Fine Art, London since 2009. She gained election to membership of the Royal Academy of Arts in 2005. Milroy was appointed Artist Trustee of Tate from 2013 to 2017 and Liaison Trustee to the National Gallery from 2015 – 2017.

In 2015, Milroy set up Hands On Art Workshops, contributing to Vodafone Foundation and UNHCR’s Instant Network Schools digital learning programme. Hands On Art Workshops engages primary and secondary school students in Kakuma Refugee Camp, Kenya in practical art workshops, which Milroy delivers from London through live interactive video conference sessions. Milroy travels to Kakuma Refugee Camp annually to deliver Hands On Art Workshops, working with UNHCR Kakuma.

== Public collections ==
Public collections including her work include: Walker Art Gallery, Shire Hall, Stafford, Wolverhampton Art Gallery, Swindon Museum and Art Gallery, Royal Academy of Arts, Arts Council Collection, Southampton City Art Gallery, Tate, Portsmouth City Museum and National Trust.
