= Peter McDonald (artist) =

Japanese/English artist (born 1973)

Peter McDonald (born 1973) is a Japanese/English artist who won the 2008 John Moores Painting Prize.

== Life and career ==
McDonald was born in Tokyo, Japan and studied at St. Martins School of Art. He lives and works in London and Tokyo. His brother Roger McDonald is the director of Arts Initiative Tokyo. His father, originally from north London, migrated to Japan in the 50s. His mother is from east Tokyo.

McDonald was awarded the 2008 John Moores Painting Prize for the canvas "Fontana", receiving a prize of £25,000. The painting refers to the work and practice of the Italian painter Lucio Fontana, who was infamous for slashing and puncturing his paintings. McDonald's painting pictures an artist at work at the easel but has real holes in the surface of the painting. The painting was chosen from 3,222 entries, shortlisted to 40 works which were judged by Sacha Craddock, Jake and Dinos Chapman, Paul Morrison and Graham Crowley.

== Exhibitions ==
- 2009 Art on the Underground, public commission for Southwark Station, London Underground
- 2008 Peter McDonald, Gallery Side 2, Tokyo
- 2008 John Moores Contemporary Painting Prize, Walker Art Gallery, Liverpool
- 2008 Imaginary Realities: Constructed Worlds in Abstract and Figurative Painting, Max Wigram Gallery, London
- 2007 Peter McDonald, Kate MacGarry, London
- 2007 Like Color in Pictures, Aspen Art Museum, Colorado
- 2007 Mutineer, Kunsthalle M8, Berlin
- 2006 The Wonderful Fund, Pallant House Gallery, Chichester
- 2006 Group show, Hiroshima Museum of Contemporary Art, Japan
- 2006 Group show, Galleri Charlotte Lund, Stockholm, Sweden
- 2006 Peter McDonald, Gallery Side 2, Tokyo
- 2005 Peter McDonald, Kate MacGarry, London
- 2005 Makeover, Paintings by Seven Pacific Rim Artists,
- 2005 Govett-Brewster Art Gallery, New Plymouth, New Zealand
- 2005 Rough Diamond, Program, London
- 2004 Painting, Kate MacGarry, London
- 2003 Peter McDonald, Keith Talent Gallery, London
- 2003 East International, Norwich Gallery, UK
- 2003 Bad Touch, Keith Talent Gallery
- 2003 Moving Collection, Govett-Brewster Art Gallery, New Zealand
- 2003 Good Bad Taste, Keith Talent Gallery
- 2002 Peter McDonald, Gallery Side 2, Tokyo, Japan
- 2001 Table Manners, Mizuma Gallery, Tokyo
- 2000 Crossed Purposes, Mafuji Gallery, London
