= Jacqui Hallum =

Contemporary artist

Jacqui Hallum (born 1977) is a contemporary artist. She is the 2018 John Moores Painting Prize recipient. She has exhibited throughout the UK but also abroad. Hallum's solo display—entitled The View from the Top of the Pyramid—was exhibited at the Walker Art Gallery in 2019/2020.

== Exhibitions ==
- Kingsgate Workshops (with Leon Kossoff)
- Exeter Phoenix Studio 74
- The View from the Top of the Pyramid, Walker Art Gallery, 12 October 2019 – 26 April 2020. Featuring words and pictures by Col O'Kell, the main attraction was the Moores Painting winning piece.
- Hastings Art Forum
- ESPS
- Lido, St Leonards-on-Sea

== Awards ==
- 2018 John Moores Painting Prize recipient. She received the 30th biennial (£25,000 reward) for her painting King and Queen of Wands, chosen from over 2700 entries. The piece was inspired by the Rider–Waite tarot deck. Since the 30th year marked the prize's 60th anniversary, Hallum was also gifted with a Walker Art Gallery solo display and a 3-month exhibition at the John Moores University.
- The Dundee Visual Artists Award
- The Worshipful Company of Painters and Stainers Bursary Award
- Arts and Humanities Research Board Bursary Award
