= Not Waving but Drowning =

Poem by Stevie Smith

"Not Waving but Drowning" is a poem by the British poet Stevie Smith. It was published in 1957, as part of a collection of the same title. The most famous of Smith's poems, it gives an account of a drowned man, whose distant movements in the water had been mistaken for waving. The poem was accompanied by one of Smith's drawings, as was common in her work.

The poem's personal significance has been the topic of several pieces of literary criticism, because Smith was treated for psychological problems. She contemplated suicide at the age of eight, after what she described as a difficult childhood and her struggle with the fact that her father abandoned her.

== Interpretations ==
Like many of Smith's poems, "Not Waving but Drowning" is short, consisting of only twelve lines. The narrative takes place from a third-person perspective, and describes the circumstances surrounding the "dead man" described in line one. In line five, the poem suggests that the man who has died "always loved larking," which causes his distress signals to be discounted.

The image that Smith attached to the poem shows the form of a girl from the waist up, with her wet hair hanging over her face. Although the image goes with a poem about a man drowning, the girl's expression appears incongruous with the text of the poem, as it forms what Smith scholar Laura Severin describes as a "mysterious smile". Jannice Thaddeus suggests that the speaker of the poem, like other figures in Smith's works, changes from male to female as part of a theme of androgyny that exists in many of the poems found in Selected Poems. Severin suggests that the figure might be Mary, a character in another poem by Smith titled "Cool as a Cucumber". The drawing was used as the accompanying image for the poem "The Frozen Lake" in Selected Poems, a self-edited compilation of Smith's works published in 1962.

Although Ingrid Hotz-Davies suggests that the "drowning man" is Smith herself, she also states that there are problems with reading the poem as a cry for help, due to the humorous tone of the poem, yet at the same time she also notes that the representational form of the poem "may easily be misread as a friendly wave of the hand". The poem's simple diction led Clive James to suggest that Smith attempted to write the poem so that the diction appeared ignorant of poetic convention, yet was carefully crafted to appear more simple than it was. James describes the relationship between Smith and the speaker in "Not Waving but Drowning" by saying, "her poems, if they were pills to cure Melancholy, did not work for [Smith]. The best of them, however, worked like charms for everyone else."
