= Edward Lucie-Smith =

Jamaican-born British writer, poet and art critic (1933–2026)

Edward Lucie-Smith FRSL
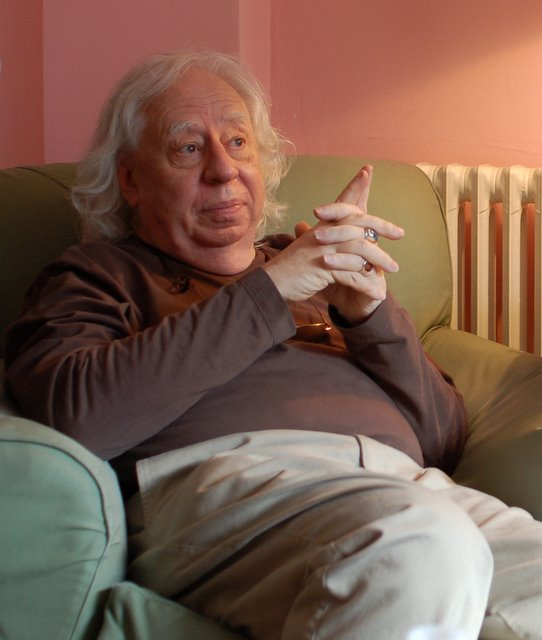
- Lucie-Smith in 2006
- Born: John Edward McKenzie Lucie-Smith; 27 February 1933; Kingston, Colony of Jamaica, British Empire
- Died: 11 July 2026 (aged 93)
- Citizenship: British
- Education: The King's School; Merton College (BA, 1954)
- Occupations: Writer, poet, art critic, curator and broadcaster
- Relatives: Euan Lucie-Smith (uncle)
- National Service
- Allegiance: United Kingdom
- Branch: Royal Air Force
- Rank: Education Officer

John Edward McKenzie Lucie-Smith (27 February 1933 – 11 July 2026) was a British Jamaican writer, poet, art critic, curator and broadcaster. He was highly prolific in these fields, writing or editing over a hundred books, his subjects gradually shifting around the late 1960s from mostly literature to mostly art.

== Life and career ==
John Edward McKenzie Lucie-Smith was born in Kingston, Jamaica, on 27 February 1933, the son of Mary Frances (née Lushington) and John Dudley Lucie-Smith. He moved to the United Kingdom in 1946. He was educated at The King's School, Canterbury, then spent time in Paris. In 1954, he received a Bachelor of Arts from Merton College, Oxford.

After Service serving in the Royal Air Force as an education officer and working as a copywriter, Lucie-Smith became a full-time writer (as well as anthologist and photographer). He succeeded Philip Hobsbaum in organising The Group, a London-centred poets' group.

He was elected a Fellow of the Royal Society of Literature in 1964. With Bernard Stone and George Rapp he was a director of the small press Turret Books, founded in 1965 in London. Wallace Southam set some of his poetry to music for Turret and Jupiter Records.

At the beginning of the 1980s he conducted several series of interviews, Conversations with Artists, for BBC Radio 3. He was a contributor to The London Magazine, in which he wrote art reviews, and wrote regularly for the independent magazine ArtReview from the 1960s until the 2000s. A prolific writer, he penned more than one hundred books in total on a variety of subjects, chiefly art history as well as biographies and poetry.

In addition he curated a number of art exhibitions, including three Peter Moores projects at the Walker Art Gallery in Liverpool, The New British Painting (1988–1990) and two retrospectives at the New Orleans Museum of Art. He was a curator at the Bermondsey Project Space.

During his later years Lucie-Smith promoted drawings attributed to Francis Bacon owned by Italian journalist Cristiano Lovatelli Ravarino. However, Christie's, Sotheby's and the Francis Bacon Estate have not authenticated these works known as the 'Francis Bacon Italian Drawings'. Martin Harrison, the editor of the Francis Bacon: Catalogue Raisonné, does not include 'The Francis Bacon Italian Drawings' and does not see the hand of Bacon in these drawings.

His uncle Euan Lucie-Smith was one of the first mixed-heritage infantry officers in a regular British Army regiment, and the first killed in World War I.

Edward Lucie-Smith died on 11 July 2026, at the age of 93.

== Bibliography ==
=== Poetry and fiction ===
- Lucie-Smith, Edward (1954). J. E. M. Lucie-Smith. The Fantasy Poets; No. 25. Eynsham, Oxford: Fantasy Press.
- A Tropical Childhood and Other Poems (1961)
- Confessions & Histories (1964)
- Penguin Modern Poets 6 (1964; with Jack Clemo and George MacBeth)
- A Game of French and English (1965) poems
- Jazz for the N.U.F. (1965)
- Mystery in the Universe: Notes on An Interview with Allen Ginsberg (1965)
- The Penguin Book of Elizabethan Verse (1965), editor
- A Choice of Browning's Verse (1967)
- Five Great Odes by Paul Claudel (1967), translator
- Borrowed Emblems (1967)
- Jonah: Selected Poems of Jean-Paul de Dadelsen (1967), translator
- Silence (1967), poetry
- The Penguin Book of Satirical Verse (1967), editor
- The Little Press Movement in England and America (1968)
- More Beasts for Guillaume Apollinaire (1968)
- Snow Poem (1968)
- Towards Silence (1968)
- Egyptian Ode (1969)
- Holding Your Eight Hands (1969; science fiction verse anthology), editor
- Six Kinds of Creature (1969)
- Six More Beasts (1970)
- British Poetry since 1945 (1970 anthology), editor
- The Rhino (1971) with Ralph Steadman
- A Garland from the Greek (1971)
- French Poetry Today: a bilingual anthology (1971; co-editor, with Simon Watson Taylor)
- Primer of Experimental Poetry 1, 1870–1922. Volume I (1971) editor
- Two Poems of the Night (1972; with Ralph Steadman)
- The Well-Wishers (1974)
- The Dark Pageant (1977)
- One Man Show (1981), with Beryl Cook
- Private View (1981), with Beryl Cook
- Bertie and the Big Red Ball (1982; with Beryl Cook)
- Beasts with Bad Morals (1984)
- Poems for Clocks (1986)
- The lesson (2001)
- Changing Shape: New and Selected Poems (2002)

=== Non-fiction ===
==== 1960–1979 ====
- Rubens (1961) Edward Lucie-Smith launched his career as an art historian and non-fiction author with this 1961 publication—an introductory volume commissioned by publisher Paul Hamlyn. The book (later reprinted in 1964 and 1965, and extensively revised and expanded in 1966) marked his transition from poetry and advertising into a prolific career in art criticism, during which he went on to publish over 100 books.
- What is a Painting? (1966)
- The Liverpool Scene: Recorded Live Along the Mersey Beat (1967)
- Sergei De Diaghileff (1929) Anthony Howell
- Thinking About Art: Critical Essays
- Movements in Art since 1945 (1969)
- Art in Britain 1969–70 (1970) with Patricia White
- A Concise History of French Painting (1971)
- Eroticism in Western Art (1972; revised as Sexuality in Western Art, 1991)
- Symbolist Art (1972)
- Movements in Modern Art (1973; with Donald Carroll)
- The First London Catalogue (1974)
- Late Modern: The Visual Arts Since 1945 (1975)
- The Invented Eye: Masterpieces of Photography, 1839–1914 (1975)
- The Waking Dream Fantasy and the Surreal in Graphic Art 1450–1900 (1975; with Aline Jacquot)
- The Burnt Child: An Autobiography (1975)
- World of the Makers: Today's Master Craftsmen and Craftswomen (1975)
- How the Rich Lived: The Painter as Witness 1870–1914 (1976; with Celestine Dars)
- Fantin-Latour (1977)
- Art Today: From Abstract Expressionism to Superrealism (1977)
- Joan of Arc (1977)
- Toulouse-Lautrec (1977)
- Work and Struggle: The Painter as Witness, 1870–1914 (1977; with Celestine Dars)
- Outcasts of the Sea: Pirates and Piracy (1978)
- A Concise History of Furniture (1979)
- A Cultural Calendar of the 20th Century (1979)
- Super Realism

==== 1980–1999 ====
- Art in the Seventies (1980)
- The Story of Craft: The Craftsman's Role in Society (Phaidon, Oxford, 1981; ISBN 0714820377)
- The Art of Caricature (1981)
- The Body: Images of the Nude (1981)
- The Sculpture of Helaine Blumenfeld (1982)
- A History of Industrial Design (1983)
- The Thames & Hudson Dictionary of Art Terms (1984)
- Nudes and Flowers: 40 Watercolours by David Hutter (1984)
- Steve Hawley (1984)
- Art of the 1930s: The Age of Anxiety (1985)
- American Art Now (1985)
- Lives of the Great Twentieth Century Artists (1985)
- The Male Nude: A Modern View (1985; with François de Louville)
- Michael Leonard: Paintings (1985; with Lincoln Kirstein)
- American Craft Today: Poetry of the Physical (1986; with Paul J. Smith)
- Sculpture Since 1945 (1987)
- The Self Portrait: A Modern View (1987; with Sean Kelly)
- The New British Painting (1988; with Carolyn Cohen and Judith Higgins)
- The Essential Osbert Lancaster: An Anthology in Brush and Pen (1988) editor
- Impressionist Women (1989)
- Art in the Eighties (1990)
- Art Deco Painting (1990)
- Fletcher Benton (1990; with Paul J. Karlstrom)
- Jean Rustin (1990)
- Harry Holland: The Painter and Reality (1991)
- Keith Vaughan 1912–1977: Drawings of the Young Male (1991)
- Sexuality in Western Art (1991)
- Wendy Taylor (1992)
- Andres Nagel (1992)
- Alexander (1992)
- Art and Civilization (1992)
- The Faber Book of Art Anecdotes (1992), editor
- Luis Caballero: Paintings & Drawings (1992)
- 20th Century Latin American Art (1993)
- Edward Lucie-Smith on Elizabeth Fritsch: Vessels from another World, Metaphysical pots Painted Stoneware, Bellew Publishing, (1993)
- British Art Now – A Personal View (1993; with Zsuzsi Roboz and Max Wykes-Joyce)
- Fritz Scholder, A Survey of Paintings 1970–1993 (1993)
- Race, Sex and Gender in Contemporary Art: The Rise of Minority Culture (1994)
- Elisabeth Frink: A Portrait (1994)
- John Kirby: The Company of Strangers (1994)
- American Realism (1994)
- Art Today (1995)
- Panayiotis Kalorkoti, Reflections of Grizedale (Acrylics, Watercolours, Etchings) (1995)
- Visual Arts in the 20th Century (1996)
- Leonardo Nierman: 1987–1994 Painting/Sculpture/Tapestry (1996)
- Albert Paley (1996)
- Ars Erotica: An Arousing History of Erotic Art (1997)
- Dunbar Mining The Surfaces (1997)
- Glenys Barton (1997; with Adrian Flowers and Robin Gibson)
- Impressionist Women: Reality Observed (1997)
- Adam: The Male Figure in Art (1998)
- Chadwick (1998)
- Zoo: Animals in Art (1998)
- Lives of the Great 20th Century Artists (1999)
- Sean Henry – the Centre of the Universe (1999; with Beatrice F. Buscaroli)
- Women and Art: Contested Territory (1999), with Judy Chicago

==== 2000 to 2026 ====
- Judy Chicago: An American Vision (2000)
- Flesh and Stone (2000)
- Sergio Ceccotti, Editions Lachenal & Ritter, Paris, 2001.
- Art Tomorrow (2002)
- Roberto Marquez (2002)
- David Remfry: Dancers (2002) Hardback ISBN 0-936859-42-3
- Color of Time: The Photographs of Sean Scully (2004) with essays by Arthur C. Danto and Mia Fineman, plus an interview by Edward Lucie-Smith.
- Elias Rivera (2006) with forward by the actor Gene Hackman and essay by Edward Lucie-Smith
- Censoring the Body (2007) ISBN 1905422539
- Byzantium and Beyond: The Paintings of Dave Pearson (2012)
- "Edward Lucie-Smith: Autobiography—A Child of World War I" The London Magazine: 106–18. (2014)
- Amazonia Imagined (2016)
- Pop Expressionism (2016)
- Steven Heffer; A Very British Modernist (2016)
- Painting with Both Hands (2017)
- New Dimensions in Art (2017)
