= BP Portrait Award =

Annual portraiture competition in England

Gallus Gallus with Still Life and Presidents by Stuart Pearson Wright winner in 2001

The BP Portrait Award was an annual portraiture competition held at the National Portrait Gallery in London, England. It is the successor to the John Player Portrait Award. It is the most important portrait prize in the world, and is reputedly one of the most prestigious competitions in contemporary art. Starting in 2024, the National Portrait Gallery's portrait competition resumed under the new sponsorship of international law firm Herbert Smith Freehills.

== History ==
British Petroleum took over sponsorship of the competition in 1989 from John Player & Sons, a tobacco company which had sponsored it from its inception in 1980, and has sponsored it since. The presence of both sponsors has triggered protests, with the group Art Not Oil (part of the international Rising Tide network) being responsible for most of those against BP. In 2016, The Museums Association conducted a formal investigation into BP's sponsorship when Art Not Oil alleged that the company influenced curatorial decisions and used its association with the National Gallery to further its political interests both domestic and international.

The exhibition opens in June each year and runs until September. First prize is typically £30,000. In the early years of the century, the prize went up from £5,000, and its catchment area was gradually extended from residents of the UK and is now unrestricted. Until 2006, the competition has been open to under-40s only. Since 2007, it is open to anyone over the age of 18 and a separate BP Young Artist Award is granted to the best portrait artist between 18 and 30.

In 1993, Tom Hallifax was used to advertise the awards.

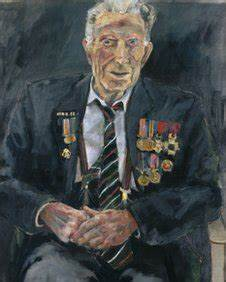
The Last Tommy – by Dan Llywelyn Hall, 2009

In 2009, Dan Llywelyn Hall's portrait of the last living Tommy, Harry Patch widely used for advertising. Patch died during the run of the exhibition.

In 2012 the competition received 2,187 entries from 74 countries (including 1,500 from the UK) of which 55 paintings were selected to be exhibited.

== Winners ==
=== John Player Portrait Award ===
- 1980 – Margaret Foreman
- 1981
- 1982 – Humphrey Ocean
- 1983 – Michael R. Taylor
- 1984 – Rosemary Beaton
- 1985 – Jeff Stultiens
- 1986 – Ivy Smith
- 1987 – Alison Watt
- 1988 – Allan Ramsay
- 1989 – Paula MacArthur & Tai-Shan Schierenberg – joint first prize winners

=== BP Portrait Award ===
- 1990 – Annabel Cullen
- 1991 – Justin Mortimer
- 1992 – Lucy Willis
- 1993 – Philip Harris
- 1994 – Peter Edwards
- 1995 – Ishbel Myerscough
- 1996 – James Hague
- 1997 – James Lloyd
- 1998 – Thomas Watson
- 1999 – Clive Smith
- 2000 – Victoria Russell
- 2001 – Stuart Pearson Wright
- 2002 – Catherine Goodman
- 2003 – Charlotte Harris
- 2004 – Stephen Shankland
- 2005 – Dean Marsh
- 2006 – Andrew Tift
- 2007 – Paul Emsley
- 2008 – Craig Wylie and Praneet Arora
- 2009 – Peter Monkman
- 2010 – Daphne Todd
- 2011 – Wim Heldens
- 2012 – Aleah Chapin
- 2013 – Susanne du Toit
- 2014 – Thomas Ganter
- 2015 – Matan Ben-Cnaan
- 2016 – Clara Drummond
- 2017 – Benjamin Sullivan
- 2018 – Miriam Escofet
- 2019 – Charlie Schaffer
- 2020 – Jiab Prachakul

=== SELF Portrait Prize ===
- 2013 Jan Mikulka

== Selected works ==
It has become a BP Portrait Awards convention that a single work is selected to be used prominently on that year's posters and other publicity materials, and for the cover of the year's exhibition catalogue. Recent "showcase" portraits include:

- 2004 – "Caroline" by James E Crowther
- 2005 – "Portrait of Chantal Menard" by Sean Cheetham
- 2006 – "Matthew" by Ben Jamie
- 2007 – "Winter Portrait" by Ingolv Helland
- 2008 – "Konjit" by Maryam Foroozanfar
- 2009 – "Last Tommy" by Dan Llywelyn Hall / "Georgie" by Mary Jane Ansell / "On Assi Ghat" by Edward Sutcliffe (used by National Gallery Scotland)
- 2010 – "Blue Coco" by Shaun Downey
- 2011 – "Geneva" by Ilaria Rosselli del Turco
- 2012 – "Rosie and Pumpkin" by Vanessa Lubach / "Richie Culver" by Alan Coulson
- 2013 – "Inner Dialogue" by Jamie Routley
- 2014 – "Engels" by Patrik Graham / "Gina and Cristiano" by Isabella Watling (used by National Gallery Scotland)
- 2015 – "Portrait of Esta Sexton, aged 12" by Paul P Smith
- 2016 – "Francesca" by Daniele Vezzani / "Tad (Son Of The Artist)" by John Borowicz (used by National Gallery Scotland)
- 2017 – "Lemn Sissay" by Fiona Graham-Mackay
- 2018 – "Laura" by Shawn McGovern
- 2019 – "Manresa" by Frances Borden

== BP Visitor Choice ==
Each year, the BP Visitor Choice competition offers visitors to the highly popular BP Portrait Award exhibition the opportunity to vote for their favourite portrait in the exhibition.

- 2006 – Vanessa Garwood
- 2007 – Hynek Martinec
- 2008 – José Luis Corella
- 2009 – José Luis Corella
- 2010 – Michal Ožibko
- 2011 – Jan Mikulka
- 2012 – Colin Davidson
- 2013 – Lionel Smit
- 2014 – Yunsung Jang
- 2015 – José Luis Corella
- 2016 – Jean-Paul Tibbles
- 2017 – Rupert Alexander

== BP Travel Award ==
The BP Travel Award is an annual award allowing artists to experience working in a different environment on a project related to portraiture. The successful applicants work is exhibited at the Portrait Gallery the following year. Country of each artists project shown in brackets below.

- 1998 – Stuart Pearson Wright (UK)
- 2000 – Si Sapsford (Iceland)
- 2001 – Alan Parker (UK)
- 2002 – Daisy Richardson & Jessica Wolfson (Russia/China)
- 2003 – Ulyana Gumeniuk (Russia)
- 2004 – Darvish Fakhr (Iran)
- 2005 – Joel Ely (Spain)
- 2006 – Toby Wiggins (UK)
- 2007 – Gareth Reid (Finland)
- 2008 – Emmanouil Bitsakis (China)
- 2009 – Isobel Peachey (Belgium/Switzerland)
- 2010 – Paul Beel (Greece)
- 2011 – Jo Fraser (Peru)
- 2012 – Carl Randall (Japan)
- 2013 – Sophie Ploeg (The Netherlands/UK)
- 2014 – Edward Sutcliffe (US)
- 2015 – Magali Cazo (West Africa)
- 2016 – Laura Guokė (Lithuania)

== See also ==
- List of European art awards
