= John Russell Taylor =

British writer (1935–2025)

- Born: 19 June 1935; Dover, Kent, England
- Died: 18 August 2025 (aged 90)
- Education: Jesus College, Cambridge; Courtauld Institute of Art
- Occupations: Critic, author

John Russell Taylor (19 June 1935 – 18 August 2025) was an English critic and author. He was the author of critical studies of British theatre; of critical biographies of such figures in film as Alfred Hitchcock, Alec Guinness, Orson Welles, Vivien Leigh, and Ingrid Bergman; of Strangers in Paradise: The Hollywood Emigres 1933–1950 (1983); and several books on art.

== Background ==
Taylor was born in Dover, England, on 19 June 1935, the son of Arthur Russell and Kathleen Mary (Picker) Taylor. He attended Dover Grammar School, took a double first in English at Jesus College, Cambridge, and studied Art Nouveau book illustration at the Courtauld Institute of Art. In 2006, he entered a civil partnership with his longtime companion, the artist and photographer Ying Yeung Li. They had homes in London and Wales. Taylor died on 18 August 2025, at the age of 90.

== Career ==
In the 1960s, Taylor wrote on cinema for Sight and Sound and the Monthly Film Bulletin, on the theatre in Plays and Players, on television for The Listener and the Times Educational Supplement, and on the arts for The Times Literary Supplement. From the late 1950s, he began writing anonymously on television and theatre for The Times, and by 1962 he had become the paper's film critic, initially anonymous but later named after the paper abandoned its anonymity rule in January 1967 when William Rees-Mogg became editor.

During this era, Taylor wrote books including Anger and After: A Guide to the New British Drama (1962), titled The Angry Theatre in the USA; revised and expanded and published in paperback (1969); Anatomy of a Television Play (1962), concerning the Armchair Theatre productions Afternoon of a Nymph and The Rose Affair; Cinema Eye, Cinema Ear: Some Key Film-Makers of the Sixties (1964); and The Art Nouveau Book in Britain (1966). Subsequently, he wrote The Penguin Dictionary of the Theatre (1966), The Rise and Fall of the Well-Made Play (1967), The Art Dealers (1969) and The Hollywood Musical (1971), as well as British Council monographs on Harold Pinter, Peter Shaffer and David Storey. He also edited the film criticism of Graham Greene in The Pleasure Dome (1972, called Graham Greene on Film in the USA).

In 1969, Taylor was a member of the jury at the 19th Berlin International Film Festival, and was later frequently on the juries at other festivals, including Delhi, Venice, Kraków, Cork, Istanbul, Troja, Parnu, Rio de Janeiro, Montreal and, several times, the Chicago International Film Festival.

In the early 1970s, Taylor wrote the book The Second Wave: British Drama of the Sixties, a sequel to Anger and After, and several television plays, including a version of Dracula with Denholm Elliott in the title role, which was praised by Kingsley Amis as the best version ever. In 1972, he moved to California, to teach film at the University of Southern California, in Los Angeles, serving as a Professor of Cinema from 1972 to 1978, while continuing to contribute to the London Times, as its American Cultural Correspondent, Sight and Sound, The New York Times, and the Los Angeles Times. During this period, he wrote Directors and Directions: Cinema for the Seventies (1975).

Having developed a friendship with Alfred Hitchcock during the 1970s, he became Hitchcock's authorised biographer. In 1978, after publishing Hitch, Taylor returned to the UK, becoming the art critic for The Times, a post that he held until 2005. His other books since 1978 include Strangers in Paradise: The Hollywood Emigres 1933–1950 (1983), and bio-critical studies of Ingrid Bergman (1983), Alec Guinness (1984), Vivien Leigh (1984), Orson Welles (1986), Elizabeth Taylor (1991), film historian John Kobal (2008) and the artists Edward Wolfe (1986), Peter Samuelson (1987), Robin Tanner (1989), Bernard Meninsky (1990), John Copley (1990), Muriel Pemberton (1993), Ricardo Cinalli (1993), Claude Monet (1995), Bill Jacklin (1997), Cyril Mann (1997), Peter Coker (2002), Zsuzsi Roboz (2005), Peter Prendergast (2006), Panayiotis Kalorkoti (2007), Carl Laubin (2007), Philip Sutton (2008), Kurt Jackson (2010), Philip Hicks (2013) and Paul Day (2016). More general books on art include Impressionist Dreams (1990) and Exactitude: Hyperrealist Art Today (2009).

From 2005, he contributed frequently to The Times on art and film subjects and to Apollo on art, and reviewed drama regularly for Plays International. He was also editor of the magazine Films and Filming from 1983 until its closure in 1990. In 2013, an e-book edition of Hitch with a long introductory chapter giving the history of his relationship with Hitchcock was published, and five of his early books, Anger and After, The Rise and Fall of the Well-Made Play, The Second Wave, Cinema Eye, Cinema Ear and Directors and Directions, were reprinted as part of the Routledge classic critical text series.

== Sources ==
- John Russell Taylor (1969). The Angry Theatre: New British Drama. Hill & Wang. ISBN 978-0-8090-2663-0. (Revised and expanded edition of Anger and After: A Guide to the New British Drama.)
