= Marguerite Kelsey =

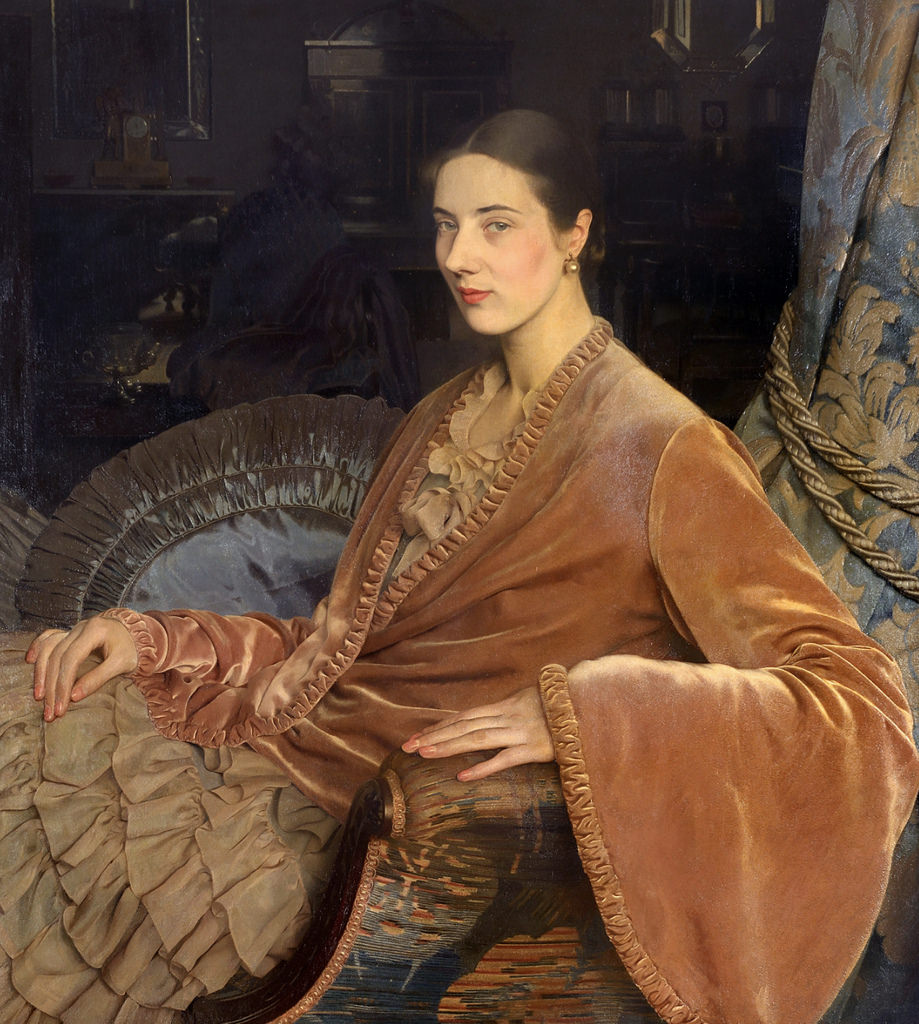
- by Alan Beeton in 1936
- Born: 11 January 1909; London
- Died: 5 March 1995 (aged 86); High Wycombe
- Occupation: artist's model

Marguerite Kelsey (11 January 1909 – 5 March 1995) was a British model for artists. She appears in notable works of art by Meredith Frampton, Dame Laura Knight, and Peter Edwards.

== Life ==
Kelsey was born in 1909 in London and by the age of fifteen she had started her career as an artist's model.

In 1928 she modeled for Meredith Frampton is a dress and shoes supplied by the artist. She was renowned for her ability to hold a pose for a long time and in this case she appeared without a corset in the fashionable style known as "Las Garconne". This painting is now in the Tate museum in London and it has been described as the "epitome of modern classicism".

In 1937 she modeled again for Frampton and as a result he painted her with cards as "A Game of Patience".

She spent two decades in New Zealand and return to the United Kingdom in the early 1980s suffering with arthritis.

In 1993, Peter Edwards exhibited in The Portrait Now show. In 1994 he won the BP Portrait Award with Portrait of an Artist's Model (of Marguerite Kelsey) who was then in her eighties.

Kelsey died in High Wycombe in 1995.

== Personal life ==
She married James Grant in 1935 and in 1961 she married Charles Barry.

== Legacy ==
Kelsey appears in paintings by noted artists including, Sir William Reid Dick, Augustus John, Dame Ethel Walker, Sir John Lavery, and Dame Laura Knight.
