= The Portrait Now =

Art exhibition in London

The Portrait Now was an exhibition of contemporary portraiture held from 1993 to 1994 at the National Portrait Gallery, London. Among many others it included portraits by Michael Andrews, Frank Auerbach, Francis Bacon, Tony Bevan, Chuck Close, Jim Dine, Peter Edwards, Stephen Finer, Lucian Freud, Richard Hamilton, Howard Hodgkin, David Hockney, Panayiotis Kalorkoti, Jeff Koons, Leon Kossoff, Alice Neel, Nam June Paik, David Salle, Julian Schnabel and Andy Warhol. It presented a decade of portraiture focusing on the forms of sculpture and painting, however it also included some video pieces.

A catalogue of the same name by Robin Gibson was published to coincide with the exhibition.

== Subjects ==
Varied subjects included self-portraits: Koons, Neel, Penck, less known figures and some well known names: Joseph Beuys by Warhol, Marlene Dietrich by Finer, President Mitterrand by Organ, Archbishop Desmond Tutu by Marisol, Seamus Heaney by Edwards, and "The Smoking Man" a video portrait by Marty St.James.

== Publication ==
- The Portrait Now. London: National Portrait Gallery, 1993. By Robin Gibson. ISBN 9781855140981.
