= Philip Harris (artist) =

British artist

Philip Harris (born 1965) is a British born artist who won first prize in the National Portrait Gallery's 1993 BP Portrait Award for portrait painting with the painting Two Figures Lying in a Shallow Stream. Harris was commissioned by the National Portrait Gallery to paint Sir Anthony Dowell, the director of The Royal Ballet.

He specialises in realistic figurative painting and portraiture in oils or pencil drawing.

In 2000, Harris's painting Two Figures Lying in a Shallow Stream was chosen by Robin Warwick Gibson, curator of the National Portrait Gallery, 20th century collection to represent the year 1992 as the best example of portraiture to have been made that year. Painting the Century: 101 Portrait Masterpieces 1900–2000 included one portrait painting from each year of the 21st century.

Harris participated in the exhibition "Reality, Modern and Contemporary Painting" in Norwich in 2014 and in Liverpool in 2015. The exhibition presented an overview of what the curators considered the best of modern British figurative painting.

Harris is represented by Beaux Arts, London, UK and held his last solo show "The Poetics of Exactitude" there in 2019.
