= Max Wykes-Joyce =

British literary and art critic (1924–2002)

- Born: 1924; Worcestershire
- Died: 2002 (aged 77–78)
- Citizenship: (United Kingdom) British
- Occupations: art and literary critic

Max Wykes-Joyce (1924 in Worcestershire – 2002) was a British art and literary critic.

== Biography ==
In the Second World War, Wykes-Joyce served in the Royal Air Force. He was a member of the International Association of Art Critics and worked as an art critic for the International Herald Tribune from 1967 to 1987 and contributed to ArtReview, then titled Arts Review in the 1960s. He was also inducted into the Accademia Italia delle Arti and was awarded its Gold medal.

Wykes-Joyce has written several books on the arts.

== Selected works ==
- Triad of Genius. Part I, Edith and Osbert Sitwell. Peter Owen LTD, 1953. ASIN: B003AJBNN6
- 7000 Years of Pottery and Porcelain. Philosophical Library, 1958. ASIN: B0007DXL42
- Cosmetics and adornment: Ancient and contemporary usage. Owen, 1961. ASIN: B0000CL63U
- Art in Israel. With an introduction from Benjamin Tammuz. WH Allen, 1966. ASIN: B000JQQIPQ
- Knut Steen Floating Gravity Recent Sculptures and Graphics. Leinster Fine Art & Leicestershire Museums, 1985. ASIN: B002IFRY0Y
- Basil Alkazzi - New Seasons: Recent works 1989–1993. Izumi, 1993. ISBN 1-898467-00-5
- British Art Now - A Personal View. Together with Edward Lucie-Smith and Zsuzsi Roboz, Art Books International, 1993. ISBN 1-874044-03-1
- Charlotte Kell, 1944–2006: Collages, Art Boxes and Sculpture. Mailer Press, 2007. ISBN 0-9555459-1-9 (originally published in 2002)
