= Stephen Finer =

- Born: 1949
- Education: Dulwich College
- Website: www.stephenfiner.com

Stephen Finer is a London-based artist, active since the 1980s.

== Work ==
Finer participated in "British Art from the Arts Council Collection 1940–80" at the Hayward Gallery, 'Collazione Inglese ll' at the Venice Biennale and was in the touring exhibition, 'Men on Women', 'The Portrait Now' at the National Portrait Gallery and 'Painting the Century: 101 Portrait Masterpieces 1900–2000' held to celebrate the millennium also at the National Portrait Gallery, where his portrait of David Bowie is in the permanent collection. There have been many solo exhibitions.

His paintings are in the public collections of the Arts Council, Atkinson Art Gallery, British Council, Contemporary Art Society, Los Angeles County Museum of Art, Magdalene College, National Portrait Gallery, Pallant House Gallery, Plymouth City Museum and Art Gallery, Towner Gallery, Tullie House, University of Sussex.

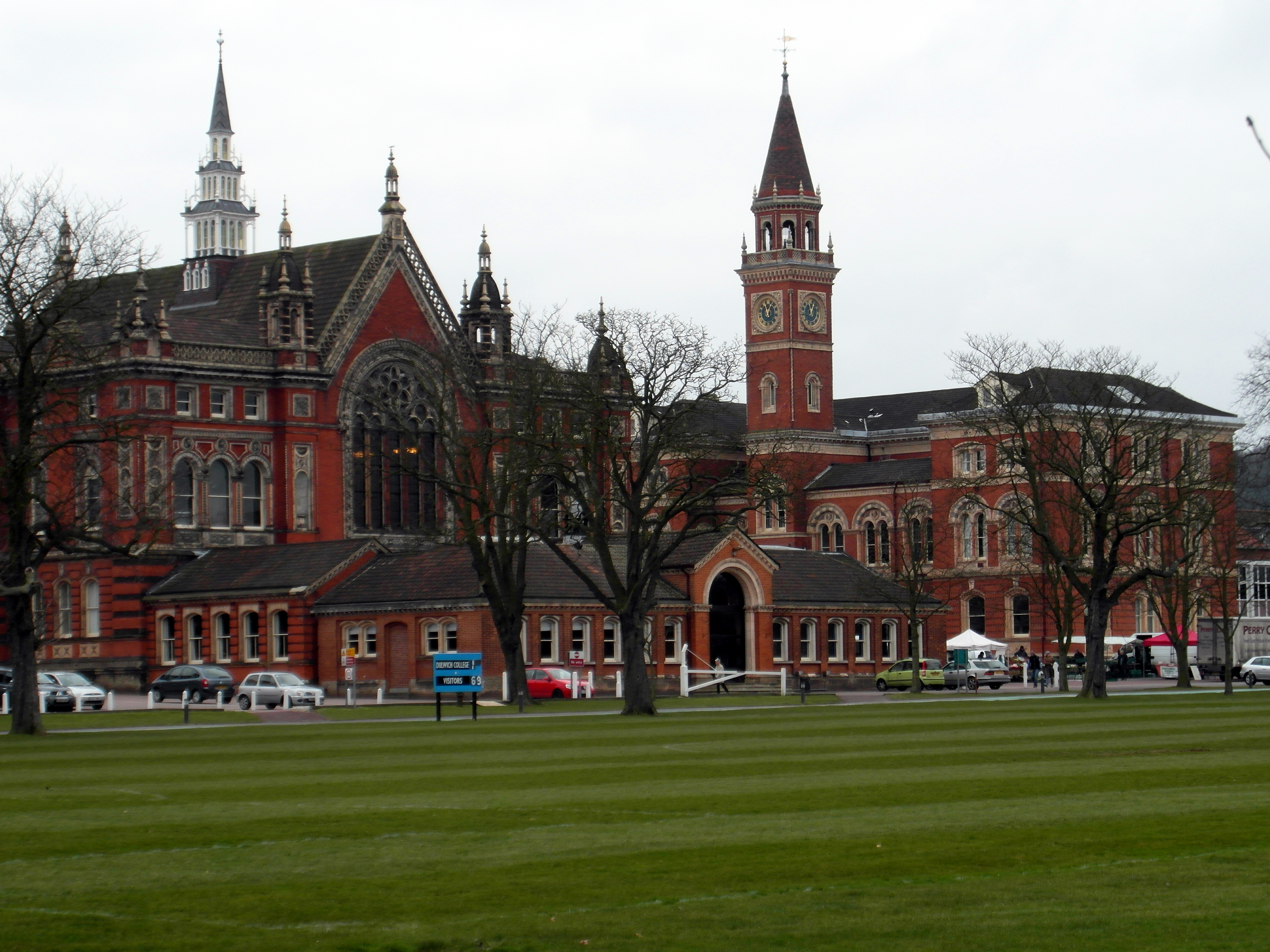
Dulwich College (8667828661)

== Subjects ==
Many of Stephen Finer's heads and figures are not identified but sometimes he has painted the same subjects several times. There are a number of paintings of Gill Bastedo, David Bowie, Iman, Hartley Shawcross, Yehudi Menuhin, Patrick Garland and others, including Marlene Dietrich, whom Finer met in London.

== Bibliography ==
- The Portrait Now published by the National Portrait Gallery ISBN 1-85514-098-5.
- 'Intimacy and Mortality Finer's People' by Robin Gibson, published by the Charleston Trust & later adapted as ISBN 0-9528502-7-3.
- 'Stephen Finer: Presence and Identity', by Martin Golding, Modern Painters Magazine ISSN 0953-6698
