= Tom Hallifax =

Anglo-Irish artist (born 1965)

- Born: 1965 (age 60–61)
- Education: Eton College; St Andrew's University; University of Ulster
- Known for: Gurning self-portraits
- Website: tomswork.com

Tom Hallifax (born 1965) is an Anglo-Irish contemporary artist who came to prominence in 1993 when his gurning self-portraits were used to publicise the National Portrait Gallery's BP Portrait Award Exhibition. Hallifax, who has lived and worked in Belfast, London, and in a remote cottage on an island off Donegal, currently resides in Dorset.

== Early life and education ==
Hallifax grew up in Hampshire, the descendant of three generations of Admirals. He was educated at Eton and St Andrew's University (1984–1988), where he read Art History, before studying Fine Art at the University of Ulster from 1989 to 1992.

== Career ==
In 1994, Hallifax was commissioned by the Prince of Wales to paint Derek Hill and the garden at Highgrove for the Prince's Trust when he completed a portrait of Chris and Lavender Patten on a visit to Hong Kong as Royal Tour Artist.

As a portraitist, his commissions have included The Prince of Wales, the last Governor of Hong Kong (Chris Patten), the Lord Mayor of Belfast (Sammy Wilson), the Chancellor of the University of Ulster (Julia, Baroness Neuberger), Professor Dame Ingrid Allen (Belfast University), John Diamond and Nigella Lawson. Recent work has been mainly figurative, with series including Irish tractors, running chickens and ugly dogs, all painted on a heroic scale. Hallifax continues to paint self-portraits in which he is often "unattractive, or strange, or both".

Hallifax's best-known self-portrait, used to advertise the BP Portrait Award on the London Underground, was bought by the fashion designer Paul Smith and now hangs in his shop in London's Covent Garden.

In 1994 Hallifax was filmed painting a self-portrait for the Ireland Arts Show, BBC Northern Ireland. In 1999, he was filmed painting the journalist and writer John Diamond for the BBC1 profile Tongue-Tied. Diamond was being treated for the throat cancer that eventually killed him and had recently had had his tongue removed. "Let's see then," asked the artist. Diamond obliged.

In 2001 he was profiled in The Times Magazine.

He has taught at the Ulster Museum (2001), in Belmarsh Prison (2008), and The Prince's Drawing School (now the Royal Drawing School), Shoreditch, (2011–2013, Big Drawings).

== Style ==
His work is recognisable for its use of bold, simple, "vibrant" images, often large-scale, set against simple backgrounds – series subjects have been folded hands, running chickens, 1960's tractors, ugly dogs, and portraits. He also paints small landscape sketches and makes large scale charcoal drawings. His pursuit of striking imagery has led to experimental combinations which fuse the snatched, blurred effects of instant photography with the painstaking formality of traditional oil painting. His playful use and subversion of traditional forms has been described as "undermining the heroic and heroising the ordinary".

== Other activities ==
Hallifax has worked as a chef, and food consultant. He has put on one-off food events at restaurants such as Moro (English Tapas, 2009) and the Zetter Townhouse (EatMyWords, a food story, 2011). He started the mobile food business Chorizo Express and is a partner in the East London pizza restaurant and wine shop Sweet Thursday. Also trained as a green oak carpenter, Hallifax has designed and constructed garden buildings and tree-houses. He is a competent sailor, and a keen forager and culinary mycologist.

== Awards ==
- Royal Ulster Academy, President's Prize (1993)
- National Portrait Gallery BP Awards, Commended (1995–96)
- Artist-in-residence, Ulster Museum (2001)

== Public collections ==
Hallifax's work is in several National Collections, including the Arts Council of Northern Ireland; The National Self-Portrait Collection of Ireland, University of Limerick (NSPCI); National Museums Northern Ireland; Belfast City Hall; Queen's University, Belfast; University of Ulster; Northern Ireland Civil Service; the Royal College of Physicians of Ireland; and the Royal College of Surgeons in Ireland.
