= Painting the Century: 101 Portrait Masterpieces 1900–2000 =

Art exhibition at the National Portrait Gallery, London

Painting the Century: 101 Portrait Masterpieces 1900–2000 was an international exhibition held at the National Portrait Gallery in London in 2000–2001 that exhibited a painting representing each year of the 20th century. A book of the same name was published by the National Portrait Gallery by Robin Gibson with an introduction by Professor Norbert Lynton that illustrates all works exhibited.

== Artists and subjects ==
Artists included Frank Auerbach, Francis Bacon, John Beard, Salvador Dalí, Otto Dix, Lucian Freud, Alberto Giacometti, George Grosz, Philip Harris, David Hockney, Howard Hodgkin, R. B. Kitaj, Oskar Kokoschka, Amedeo Modigliani, Pablo Picasso, John Singer Sargent, Egon Schiele, Walter Sickert, Marty St. James.

The subjects included Anna Akhmatova by Kuzma Petrov-Vodkin, Charlie Chaplin by Fernand Léger, Edith Sitwell by Pavel Tchelitchew, Leigh Bowery by Lucian Freud, David Bowie and Iman by Stephen Finer, Vladimir Lenin by Isaak Brodsky, a self-portrait by Edvard Munch, Somerset Maugham by Graham Sutherland, Elvis Presley by Andy Warhol, Andy Warhol by Jean-Michel Basquiat, Boy/Girl – the artists children by Marty St. James.
