= Royal Drawing School =

Educational organisation school in London, England

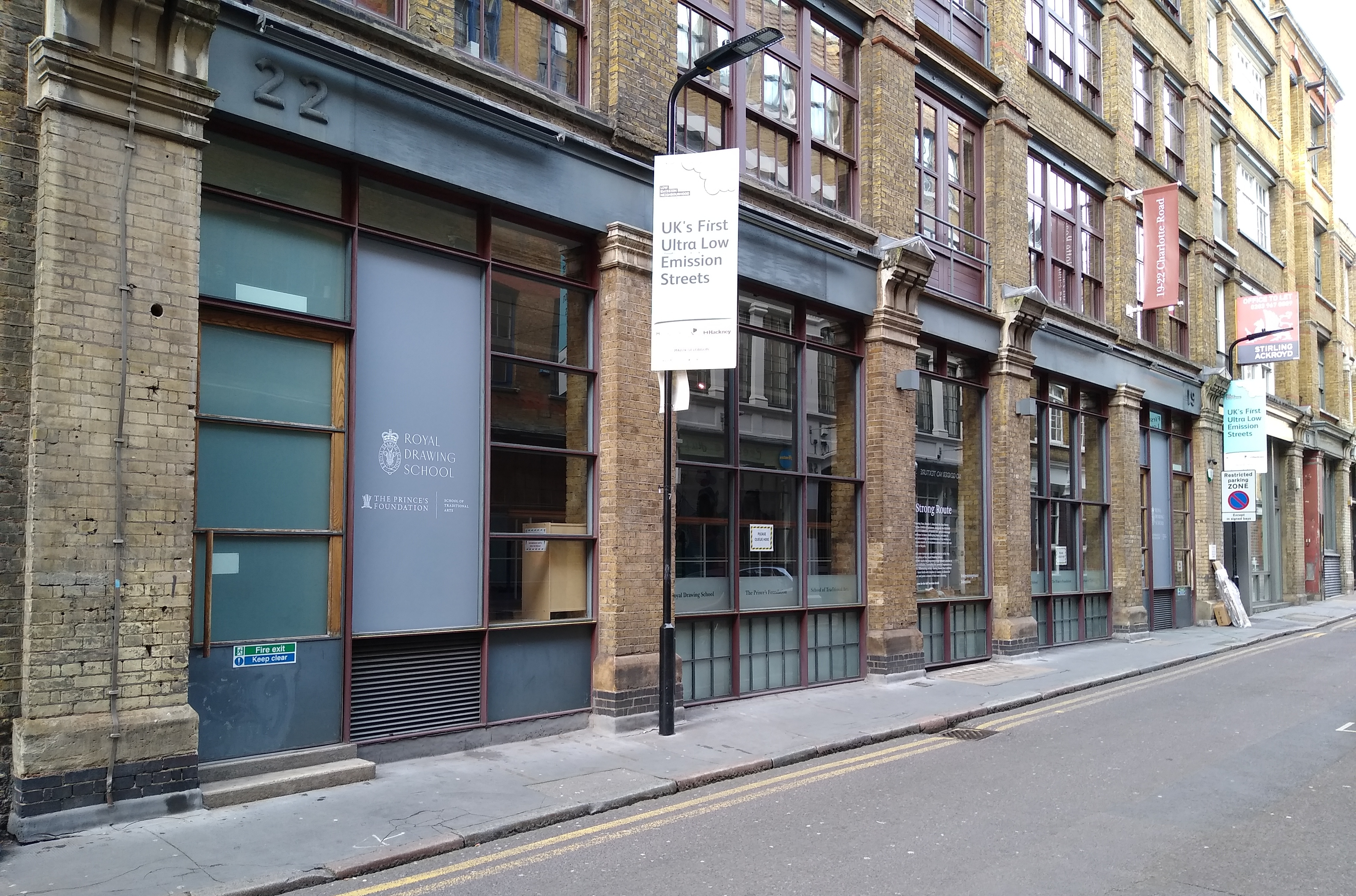
- Royal Drawing School

Location
- Shoreditch, Hackney, London; United Kingdom; 51.5257°N 0.0813°W

Information
- Type: Educational organisation and registered charity
- Established: 2000
- Founders: Charles III; Catherine Goodman
- Information: registered charity (no. 1101538)
- Website: Official website

Royal Drawing School (RDS) is an independent, not‑for‑profit educational organisation and registered charity based in Shoreditch, London. RDS teaches observational drawing at all levels and, by its 25th anniversary, was running more than 350 courses annually, from drop‑in sessions to its postgraduate programme, the Drawing Year.

The School is based at Shoreditch Studios, a converted 19th-century warehouse on Charlotte Road comprising four drawing studios, a basement intaglio print room, the ground-floor Maria Manetti Shrem Gallery Studios, and a digital studio for live-streamed teaching, with step-free access and hearing loops in all teaching spaces.

It was founded in 2000 by HM King Charles III (then Prince of Wales) and artist Catherine Goodman as the Prince’s Drawing School; the school received permission to adopt its current name in 2014.

== History ==
RDS was established in 2000, during a period when the role of traditional draughtsmanship in UK art education was widely debated. In 2025, the school marked its 25th anniversary with The Power of Drawing: Marking 25 Years of the Royal Drawing School, an exhibition at its Shoreditch studios that included works by David Hockney, Antony Gormley, Tracey Emin, Tim Burton and Quentin Blake, alongside a pencil sketch by HM King Charles III.

== Programmes ==
The Royal Drawing School runs short and term‑length public courses for adults, as well as online options. Its postgraduate programme, the Drawing Year, is a fee‑free (full‑scholarship) course that includes studio provision and professional development; places are limited to around 30 students. The school also teaches Young Artists aged 10–18, both in‑studio and online. As part of widening access, the school has expanded online provision and piloted livestreamed classes from museums and galleries.

The Drawing Year is a full-time, postgraduate-level programme for up to 30 students, selected by portfolio and interview. It comprises three taught ten-week terms followed by a self-directed studio term, and ends with a public exhibition. All students receive a full scholarship covering tuition, and a studio space.

The Online Drawing Development Year (ODDY), first run in 2022, is a part-time, unaccredited programme taught at postgraduate level for arts graduates and artists with a developing studio practice. Over three terms, students choose from the school's online courses and take part in mentoring, tutorials and group critiques. Students join from outside London; the 2024 cohort of 39 artists was based across five continents.

Drawing Foundations, launched in September 2026, is a self-paced online course of about 20 hours in four modules, taught by eight tutors of the school. Students receive a certificate of completion.

== Facilities ==
The school is based at Shoreditch Studios, a converted 19th‑century warehouse on Charlotte Road comprising four drawing studios, a basement intaglio print room, the ground‑floor Maria Manetti Shrem Gallery Studios, and a digital studio for live‑streamed teaching, with step‑free access and hearing loops in all teaching spaces.

== Exhibitions and events ==
Alongside student and alumni exhibitions, the school presents public talks and collaborations. Its 25th‑anniversary series and The Power of Drawing exhibition highlighted drawing’s role across creative disciplines and featured figures from art and design, including Hockney, Emin, Gormley and Jony Ive.

== Identity ==
In 2025, Pentagram partner Harry Pearce created a new visual identity for the school, titled "Drawing from the Source", launched during the 25th‑anniversary year.

== Governance and status ==
The Royal Drawing School is a registered charity in England and Wales (no. 1101538). The school’s Royal Founding Patron is HM King Charles III; the Vice President is The Lady Sarah Chatto. The founding artistic director is Catherine Goodman CBE LVO and the principal is Harry Parker.

== Notable alumni ==
- Alicja Biała, artist (Drawing Year alumna 2022)
- Daniel Blumberg, artist, musician, songwriter and composer (Drawing Year alumnus, 2016)
- Somaya Critchlow, painter (Drawing Year alumna, 2017).
- Liza Dimbleby, (Drawing Year alumna, 2005)
- Clara Drummond, artist (Drawing Year alumna 2005); winner of the BP Portrait Award in 2016.
- Jake Grewal, painter (Drawing Year alumnus, 2019).
- Richard Ayodeji Ikhide, artist (Drawing Year alumnus, 2017)
- Claerwen James, painter (Drawing Year alumnus, 2004).
- Olivia Kemp, artist and draughtswoman (Drawing Year alumna, 2004)
- Christina Kimeze, painter (Drawing Year alumna, 2022).
- Jessie Makinson, artist (Drawing Year alumna, 2012); winner of Marmite Prize for Painting.
- Kathryn Maple, painter (Drawing Year alumna, 2013); winner of the John Moores Painting Prize (2021).
- Francesca Mollett, painter (Drawing Year alumna, 2015).
- Louis Pohl Koseda, artist (Drawing Year alumnus, 2023); winner of the inaugural Christie’s Drawing Award.
- Carl Randall, painter; BP Portrait Award Travel Award (2012).
- Alice Shirley, artist and scarf designer for Hermès (Drawing Year alumna 2010)
- Stuart Pearson Wright, portrait artist (Drawing Year alumnus 2003); winner of the BP Portrait Award in 2001.
