= Peter Edwards (artist) =

British painter (born 1955)

Peter Edwards (born 20 November 1955) is a British painter. He won the 1994 BP Portrait Award.

== Early career ==
In 1980, he exhibited a small self-portrait in the Royal Academy Summer Exhibition. The painting was bought by the art collector, Brinsley Ford.

In 1986, his portrait of The Liverpool Poets was purchased by the National Portrait Gallery. His continuing involvement with the gallery and Robin Gibson then 20th Century Curator (later Chief Curator) led to a major one-man exhibition and tour in the Gallery in April 1990 "Contemporary Poets", which consisted of 17 large canvasses of 20 poets, alongside a poem from each poet, numerous studies, and a series of Saturday morning readings from Seamus Heaney, Douglas Dunn, Charles Causley, Wendy Cope, and Craig Raine.

On 30 July 1991, Bobby Moore unveiled Edwards' portrait of Bobby Charlton in the National Portrait Gallery, Sponsored by British Gas plc, it marked the 25th anniversary of England winning the FIFA World Cup. He later painted Ryan Giggs for the National Library of Wales.

In 1993, he exhibited in The Portrait Now show. In 1994 he won the BP Portrait Award with Portrait of an Artist's Model (of Marguerite Kelsey). She had been the model of choice, in the inter-war years, for many leading artists, including Meredith Frampton. This award led to his commission to paint Kazuo Ishiguro, which was unveiled the following summer in the National Portrait Gallery by Ismail Merchant.

== Public collections ==
- National Portrait Gallery, London. 6 works. The portraits are of: Adrian Henri, Roger McGough, Brian Patten, (triple portrait known as) The Liverpool Poets. Seamus Heaney, John Heath-Stubbs, Willy Russell, Bobby Charlton, and Kazuo Ishiguro.
- The Metropolitan Museum of Art, New York of the British Poet Peter Reading, and Armenian poet Vahé Oshagan.
- National Museum Wales, painting of Tyrone O'Sullivan.
- Ulster Museum, Belfast, painting of Michael Longley.
- National Library of Wales, 6 works
- St Andrews University, portrait of Principal Struther Arnott
- Birmingham University
- Warwick University, painting of Christopher Zeeman
- Ferens Gallery, Hull
- National Museums Liverpool portrait of Willy Russell
- Williamson Art Gallery, Birkenhead
- Moma Wales, Kyffyn Williams, Ruth Lambert
- St George's Hospital, London
- Sheffield University Portraits of Peter Middleton and Harry Kroto
- Manchester University portraits of Martin Harris and Alan Gilbert
- University of Gloucestershire portraits of Craig Raine, Kit Wright, Maud Sulter and Vuyelwa Carlin

== Bibliography ==
- The National Portrait Gallery Collection, 1988. Page 203 colour illustration The Liverpool Poets Oil on canvass, 175.9 x 237.5 By Peter Edwards, 1985 (5853) ISBN 0-904017-89-3
- Contemporary Poets, Portraits By Peter Edwards, A National portrait Gallery Exhibition, 1990. "Foreword" by Robin Gibson Curator 20th Century Collection. ISBN 0-85514-031-4. view
- The Portrait Now, National Portrait Gallery, 1993. Page 52. ISBN 1-85514-098-5
- drawings paintings and sculptures, the catalogue. Published by the museums and galleries of Northern Ireland. ISBN 0-900761-38-5. Page 247 Portrait of Michael Longley b.1939 (1989–1990) U4825
- Royal Academy Illustrated 1996, A Souvenir of the 228th Summer Exhibition. Page 10, Peter Edwards Self Portrait Oil 7 × 5 ins.
