= Edward Sutcliffe =

British painter based in London (born 1978)

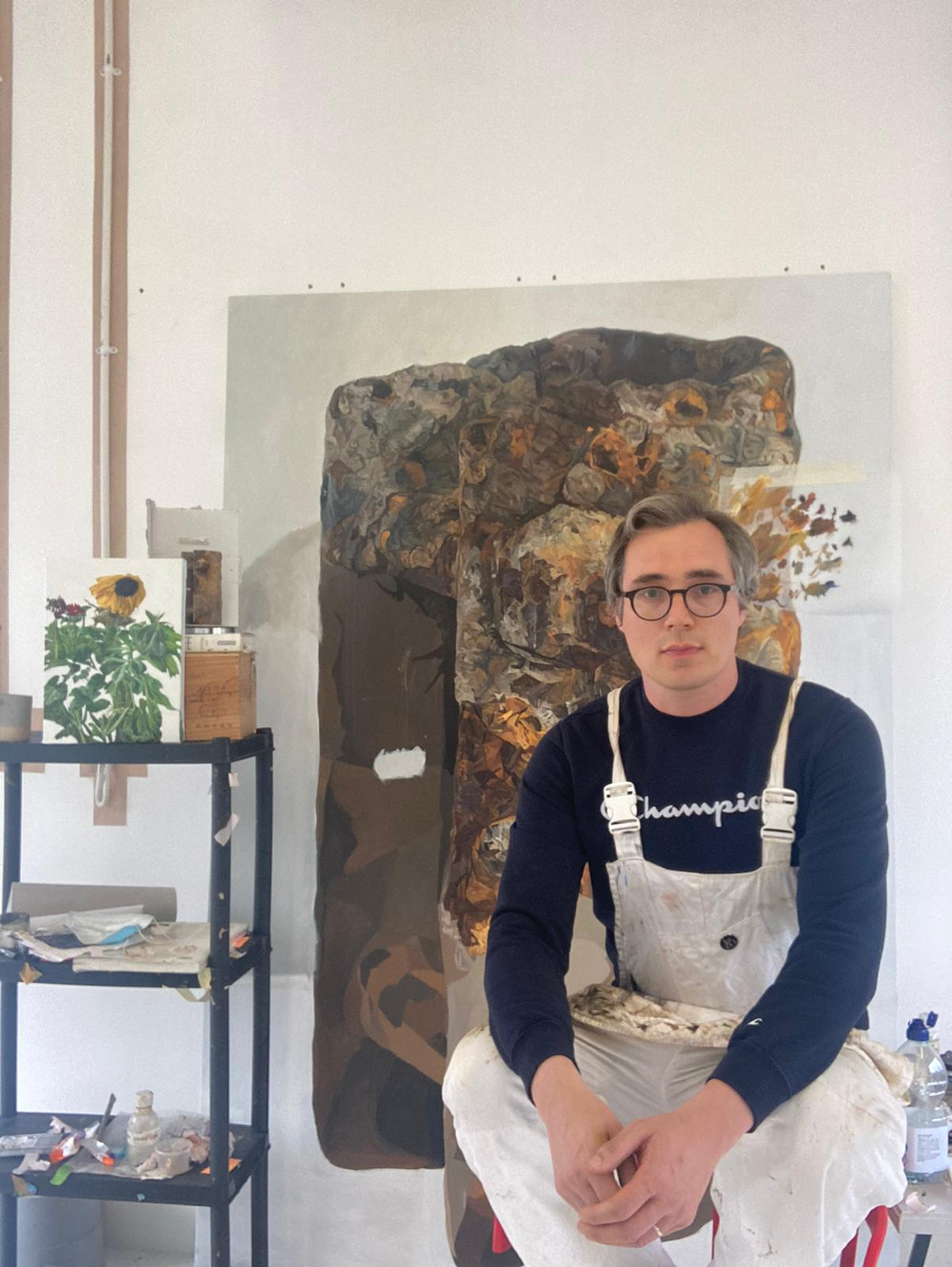
- Artist Edward Sutcliffe
- Born: Peter Edward Sutcliffe; 14 March 1978 (age 48); UK
- Education: Aberystwyth University, Central Saint Martins College of Art and Design.
- Known for: Portraiture
- Notable work: On Assi Ghat, Ricardo, Copycat
- Awards: 2014 BP Travel Award
- Website: www.edwardsutcliffe.co.uk

Edward Sutcliffe (born 1978) is a British painter based in London. He is known for still-life and portraiture, and he has painted prominent figures such as Neil Kinnock and Glenda Jackson.

== Education ==
Sutcliffe was born in Walsall, West Midlands, in 1978 and educated at Aberystwyth University where he studied Art with Art History, and Central Saint Martins College of Art and Design where he took a post-graduate diploma in fine art.

== Style and technique ==
Sutcliffe is primarily a figurative painter known for a hyper-realistic approach to portraiture and still life. His early practice was heavily influenced by the work of Lucian Freud, specifically Freud's detailed, forensic examination of flesh and form. Sutcliffe initially adopted a similarly rigorous, "warts-and-all" approach to his subjects, aiming to capture "every last detail" of the sitter's physical appearance.

However, his style later evolved away from the impasto and heavy layering associated with Freud. He began to favour a flatter, cleaner aesthetic, often isolating subjects against neutral or negative space to focus attention purely on the figure. This shift coincided with a change in medium; while he previously worked with egg tempera—a classical medium known for its durability and matte finish—he transitioned to using acrylics to achieve greater immediacy and clarity in his work.

Conceptually, Sutcliffe often explores themes of mimicry and reproduction. This is most evident in his 2014 project involving art forger John Myatt, where Sutcliffe experimented with the distortion of images and the outsourcing of painting labour to question the nature of authenticity in portraiture. Despite these conceptual experiments, he maintains that his core practice is rooted in "simple observation" and the technical discipline of recording visual reality.

== Notable works ==
Sutcliffe has painted a number of prominent political figures including Glenda Jackson, Sir Paul Stephenson, and the British Labour Party politician Neil Kinnock. His portrait of Neil Kinnock was exhibited at the Royal Society of Portrait Painters Annual Exhibition in 2014, and his portrait of Glenda Jackson was exhibited at the BP Portrait Award in 2011. In 2009, Sutcliffe's work "On Assi Ghat" was selected by the National Gallery Scotland be the featured on the publicity materials promoting that year's show.

== BP Portrait Award ==
In 2014 Sutcliffe won the 2014 BP Travel Award. He travelled to Los Angeles, California to draw and paint the players of the Compton Cricket Club, producing portraits that show a fusion of two very different cultures and how the game of cricket with its ethos of fair play and honestly has been embraced by this community. The resulting paintings and sketches were displayed at the National Portrait Gallery in London, as part of the 2015 BP Portrait Award.

== Exhibitions ==
His works have been exhibited at a number of exhibitions and galleries, including the National Portrait Gallery, London for the BP Portrait Award (2007, 2009, 2010, 2011, 2012, 2014), The Dubai Arts Centre, and The Lynn Painter-Stainers Prize at The Mall Galleries, London.
