= Catherine Goodman =

English artist

Catherine Anne Goodman CBE LVO (born 1961) is an English artist, and co-founder with King Charles III of the Royal Drawing School.

== Biography ==
=== Early life and education ===
Goodman was born in London in 1961. She is a great-granddaughter of Lady Ottoline Morrell. She studied at Camberwell School of Arts and Crafts, London from 1979 to 1984, followed by the Royal Academy Schools, London from 1984 to 1987.

=== Painting ===
Goodman has been represented by Marlborough Fine Art from 2004 and, since 2023, by Hauser & Wirth. She has had numerous solo exhibitions including 'Do you remember me...' at Waddesdon Manor in 2023, 'Portraits from Life' at the National Portrait Gallery in 2014 and the last house in the world at Marlborough Fine Art London in 2016; in 2019 she exhibited at Hauser & Wirth Somerset following five months as Artist in Residence, and at Marlborough Gallery New York with her solo exhibition, 'the light gets in'. In 2021, Goodman exhibited her latest work 'And everything changed' at Marlborough Fine Art.

Her paintings are held in numerous private and public collections including the National Portrait Gallery, which acquired her portrait of film director Stephen Frears for its 20th Century Collection; the Fitzwilliam Museum, Cambridge and the Royal Collection Trust.

=== Roles and invitations ===
Goodman sees her role as an educator as being integral to her artistic identity and in 2000 she co-established the Royal Drawing School with HM King Charles III, an independent charitable art school in London's East End to address the increasing absence of observational drawing in art education and is its Artistic Director. She has a longstanding interest in artists’ development and education, as well as the importance of drawing skills to underpin creative practice, both in fine art disciplines and more broadly in the creative industries.

In 2019, the Prime Minister appointed Goodman the artist trustee of the National Gallery.

=== Recognition ===
Goodman won the Royal Academy Gold Medal in 1987, and the BP Portrait Award at the National Portrait Gallery in 2002.

She was appointed Lieutenant of the Royal Victorian Order (LVO) in the 2014 Birthday Honours for services to the Royal Drawing School and Commander of the Order of the British Empire (CBE) in the 2024 New Year Honours for services to art.

=== Style ===
Goodman's paintings are figurative, in the School of London tradition, showing a strong emphasis on drawing and the physicality of paint. Her subject matter includes portraits, but also interior scenes and city landscapes. Writing on Goodman's winning entry for the 2002 BP Portrait Award at the National Portrait Gallery, a portrait of Father Antony Sutch, Headmaster of Downside School in Somerset, Elizabeth Grice described it as having, 'the quiet authority of an icon'. The portrait took two years to paint, and is typical of Goodman's methodical way of working. In her own words she is a fast painter, she spends 'a very long time on my pictures and I destroy a fair amount.'

As well as working directly from life Goodman will work from photographs, but she is an artist who places a great deal of emphasis on drawing skills. She has described this as an essential part of art, as the means for "recreating from life a three-dimensional reality on a two-dimension space.".

Lines of succession
Preceded by Marina Leigh	Line of succession to the British throne descendant of Princess Mary of Great Britain, daughter of George II	Succeeded by Elizabeth Goodman
