= Alicja Biała =

Artist

Alicja Biała (born 1993, Poznań) is a contemporary Polish visual artist known for her large-scale murals, sculptures, and multimedia works. She is based between Amsterdam, London and Poznań.

Intergenerational storytelling, ecology and the environment, pagan tradition, migration, politics, and the formation of cultural identity are themes that appear frequently in her work. Biała often draws from Slavic and folk symbols, blending the historical past with the political and personal realities of contemporary life.

Biała has gained widespread recognition for her public sculptures and murals.

== Early life and education ==
Biała was born in Poznań, Poland. She is a graduate of The Copenhagen School of Design and Technology in Copenhagen and the Royal Drawing School in London, and she holds an MA from the Royal College of Art in London.

== Murals and public art ==
Biała is perhaps most well-known for her large-scale mural paintings, which are often found in urban spaces. One of her most notable projects is the series of murals she created inside the Concordia Design building in Wrocław, Poland, as part of the building’s renovation and extension by architecture firm MVRDV. Covering 500 square metres, these murals were created around the architecture of the historic building to celebrate local folklore, flora and fauna as well as mythical characters from the region.

Another example of a characteristic mural is Untitled, located in Kassel, Germany. This wall painting was inspired by a photograph by Biała’s great-grandmother. Following the war, her great-grandmother became a teacher for blind children. Some of her students lost their sight as a result of warfare, mine explosions, and bombs, and this mural references this very local history of Kassel.

== Sculptural and multimedia work ==
In addition to painting, Biała has produced a range of sculptures and multimedia installations. Her sculptures often feature a combination of natural materials and industrial elements, aiming to interrogate issues relating to ecology and sustainability.

One of her most renowned works is The Totemy Series. This series of large-scale “totems” represents physical visualisations of statistics and figures related to climate change. These intricate, colourful pieces interrogate the opaque nature of the warnings given to us in numerical forms by bringing disparate statistical elements together in more tangible and relational form. Each physical sculpture is also given a digital counterpart online, where the information that determines the proportions of its form are explained.

Notable examples from this series include Merseyside Totemy, commissioned by Liverpool Biennial in partnership with Liverpool BID Company (2022), which comprised three large-scale totems that stood in Merseyside, Liverpool, until 2024. The work brought together statistics around the local effect of climate change, especially in regards to rising sea levels and flooding, aiming to shift the conversation towards the potential for mitigation and action, rather than prevention.

Other notable examples include the three Totems for Forest of Dean Sculpture Trail (2021), which visualised statistics on decline of UK wildlife, and the six Totems permanently installed beneath MVRDV's Bałtyk tower in Poznań, Poland (2019); each of the six Totemy sculptures is a nine-metre-tall, geometric wooden tower, designed to communicate a statistic about an environmental issue relating to the area. For instance, one totem illustrates what has happened to every piece of plastic produced throughout history, another how much water is used in the production of 1 kcal of different types of food, and another that a forest area comparable to the size of Poland disappears every year.

In a newer series, titled Open Bite (2022-ongoing), the artist visits former mining sites across Europe, which remain heavily contaminated due to the byproducts of the mining process, and uses acidic ponds of water she locates there to etch large-scale “curtains” made of copper and zinc.

== Exhibitions ==
Alicja Biała’s work has been exhibited in galleries and cultural institutions internationally. Exhibitions include:

- Opowieść z DNA Studni, Borowik Foundation, 2024

- Acid Pond, Museum of Contemporary Art Krakow, 2024

- This is indeed a wonderful country, Galerie Hussenot, 2023

- Merseyside Totemy, Liverpool Biennial of Contemporary Art, 2022

== Artistic style ==
Biała’s work is often characterised by its bold use of colour, its graphic style and multilayered symbolism. Her pieces address critical contemporary issues such as climate change, national and cultural identity, and the human impact on the environment.

She often collaborates with scientists and researchers to inform her work.

In her practice, Biała experiments with scale and uses various materials, creating a variety of works; large-scale urban murals, sculptures of various scales, paintings and prints. Her installations often challenge viewers to rethink their relationship with the world around them, incorporating interactive and immersive elements.
