= Miriam Escofet =

Spanish painter (born 1967)

- Born: 1967 (age 58–59); Barcelona
- Occupation: Portrait painter

Miriam Escofet (/ˈɛskəˌfɛt/ ES-kə-fet; born 1967) is a Spanish portrait painter who lives and works in London.

== Early life and education ==
Miriam Escofet was born in 1967 in Barcelona, the daughter of Josep Escofet, and moved to the United Kingdom in 1979. She studied at Epsom School of Art and graduated in 3D Design from Brighton School of Art in 1991 and has been working as an artist ever since. Escofet is fluent in three languages – Spanish, Catalan, and English.

== Career ==
Since 2011 she has taught art and portrait painting at Central Saint Martin's School of Art and Design in London and, since 2010, at Heatherleys School of Fine Art. Her work is dedicated to her influences on the architecture of the classical, Gothic and Renaissance periods. She has become very known for her style of painting. She has exhibited widely in Europe. Her work has been selected for the BP Portrait Award exhibitions in 2009, 2010 and 2012 and for the Royal Society of Portrait Painters annual exhibition.

Her artworks have featured in galleries such as Christopher Wood Gallery, Mallet of Bond Street, Rafael Vals, Duke Street, and the Albemarle Gallery. She has numerous of solo exhibitions as well. She is an associate member at the Royal Society of Portrait Painters. Escofet's artwork become the cover of books, magazines, and flyers. Her artwork Order of Caryatids became the cover of Clavis Journal Volume 3 book. She has published two books with her father, Josep Escofet.

Escofet has done four solo exhibitions. Her first solo was in 2001 at the Albemarle Gallery in London. The others were in 2005 and 2007 at the Galerie Michelle Boulet in Paris, and in 2008, again at the Albemarle Gallery. She has had two exhibitions with her father, Josep Escofet, in 2010 and in 2011 at Villa Beretelli, Italy. Her artwork is commonly found in the Albemarle Gallery. Her debut was in 1999 at the Annual Still Life and Trompe Show. In 2000, she was part of the millennium art show. In 2006, she was in the tenth anniversary show. In 2010, she was in the Art of Charity show. In 2011, her work was featured for the summer collective. As part of the Royal Society of Portrait Painters, her artwork featured in the annual exhibition. She has been featured in four of the annual exhibitions.

She was commissioned by the Foreign and Commonwealth Office to paint a portrait of Queen Elizabeth II, which was unveiled in 2020.

== Awards ==
- BP Portrait Award 2018
- BP Portrait Award 2012, NPG Publications
- BP Portrait Award 2010, NPG Publications
- BP Portrait Award 2009, NPG Publications
- BP Portrait Award 2007, NPG Publications

== Sources ==
- Voynovskaya, Nastia (18 July 2014). "Miriam Escofet's Esoteric Paintings of Idyllic Worlds". Hi-Fructose Magazine.
- BP Portrait Award 2010. National Portrait Gallery. 2010. p. 37. ISBN 978-1-85514-424-8.
- BP Portrait Award 2007. National Portrait Gallery Publications. 2007. p. 33. ISBN 978-1-85514-385-2.
- Brusen, Claus (2009). Imaginaire II. Fantasmus-Art. ISBN 978-87-992147-4-7.
- Fuchs, Reinhard (2012). Women in Art. Vol. 1. Edition Fuchs. ISBN 978-3-9503574-1-7.
- Clavis: A Journal of Occult Arts, Letters, and Experience. Vol. 3. Clavis. 2014. ISBN 978-3-9503574-1-7.
- Cashdan, Marina (7 December 2010). "Photorealist Painting vs. Painterly Photography". The Huffington Post.
