= Donald Carroll =

American poet

Donald Carroll (12 December 1940 – 30 December 2010) was an American author, editor, poet, columnist and humourist.

== Early life ==
Born in Dallas, Texas, in 1940, he was educated at the University of Texas, where he founded the poetry quarterly Quagga – which published the work of Richard Wilbur, e.e. cummings, Lawrence Ferlinghetti and Robert Creeley, among others – and at Trinity College Dublin, where he founded The Dubliner, a literary magazine, and edited the anthology, New Poets of Ireland. While at Trinity his own poems were widely published and earned an invitation from T.S. Eliot to visit him in London.

== Editor and publisher ==
Carroll moved to London in 1964 and after a brief spell as a literary agent, during which he met Quentin Crisp and worked closely with him in producing The Naked Civil Servant, he set up his own publishing house in 1966. The firm's first two books, The Liverpool Scene, which introduced the "Liverpool poets", and The Wife of Martin Guerre, made an immediate impact. By the end of the company's first year, its list of authors included Robert Bly, Brigid Brophy, Dick Clement and Ian La Frenais, James Dickey, Adrian Henri, Michael Levey, Edward Lucie-Smith, Roger McGough, Charles Osborne, Brian Patten and Ralph Steadman. The London Evening Standard declared Carroll to be, at 26, "one of the British publishing world's most important and successful figures".

== Columnist and humourist ==
After a disagreement over editorial policy with his firm's German backer, he left publishing in 1968 to become a columnist, producing four national newspaper and magazine columns in addition to his own newsletter, The Fifth Column. In 1972 he returned to the US, living first in Los Angeles and then in New York, where he continued his columns for the London Evening News and Books and Bookmen. Over the next few years he also conducted a series of highly acclaimed interviews (with Prime Minister Harold Wilson, Kenneth Tynan, Malcolm Muggeridge, Henry Moore among others) for the Xerox Education Group, which were collected in a book, The Donald Carroll Interviews. In addition he wrote several humorous books, including Doing It with Style, in which he revived his collaboration with Quentin Crisp.

== Recent years ==
In 1984 he returned briefly to England, before moving to Greece and then settling in Turkey, where he built a house at the tip of the Bodrum peninsula. Here he wrote the first of his travel books, the award-winning Insider's Guide to Turkey, as well as numerous articles for publications in England and America. It was also here that he became fascinated with the excavations at Ephesus, an interest that led eventually to his book Mary’s House, which established his reputation as the world's leading expert on the history and discovery of the House of the Virgin Mary at Ephesus.

== Death ==
From 1997 he lived in Southwest France, where he died on 30 December 2010.

== Selected bibliography ==
- New Poets of Ireland (1963), editor
- Art of the Romantic Era by Marcel Brion (1966), translator
- The Donald Carroll Interviews (1973), ISBN 0-900735-15-5
- Four's Company (1973) interviews; ISBN 0-900735-17-1
- Movements in Modern Art (1973), with Edward Lucie-Smith ISBN 0-8180-0122-4
- Dear Sir, Drop Dead!: Hate Mail Through the Ages (1979), editor, ISBN 0-02-040360-7
- Why Didn't I Say That?: The Art of Verbal Self-Defence (1980), ISBN 0-531-09923-7
- Doing It with Style (1981), with Quentin Crisp ISBN 0-531-09852-4
- The Best Excuse (1983), ISBN 0-698-11219-9
- The Insider's Guide to Turkey (1990), ISBN 0-86190-283-1
- The Insider's Guide to Florida (1991), ISBN 0-86190-257-2
- The Insider's Guide to Eastern Canada (1993), ISBN 0-86190-395-1
- The Insider's Guide to Western Canada (1994), ISBN 0-86190-396-X
- Resident Alien: The New York Diaries by Quentin Crisp (1996), editor, ISBN 0-00-255649-9
- Mary's House: The Extraordinary Story Behind the Discovery of the House Where the Virgin Mary Lived and Died (2000), ISBN 0-9538188-0-2
- Surprised by France (2005), ISBN 1-901130-44-4
