= Censoring the Body =

2007 book by Edward Lucie-Smith

- Author: Edward Lucie-Smith
- Language: English
- Publisher: Seagull Books
- Publication date: 2007
- ISBN: 9781905422531

Censoring the Body is a 2007 book by Edward Lucie-Smith published by Seagull Books.

== Content ==
Lucie-Smith's work explores the representation of the human body in art history and the way in which those representations show us changing attitudes to nakedness and sexuality. In the earliest extant artworks of humanity (works from the Paleolithic era) the focus is chiefly upon fertility—a focus that mutates at various points in history, particularly with the rise of Christianity and its associated ideas of Original Sin and the Fall of mankind. He also explores techniques that have been used to limit the depiction of the human body on the one hand (such as the depiction of naked men hidden behind objects such as large taps) or, alternatively, to delight in it (such as the tradition of using classical mythology as a mechanism to create representations of naked femininity).

Lucie-Smith also explores the contemporary world of aesthetics and related ethics, discussing the way that photography has altered our perceptions of artworks relating to the body, and led to a general anxiety over photographs of juvenile bodies in ways that similar painted portraits would not have struck people in the Renaissance as being problematic. His final conclusion in the book is that contemporary political correctness is in reality a euphemism for de facto censorship.
