= Aleah Chapin =

American painter

- Born: March 11, 1986 (age 40); Seattle, Washington
- Education: New York Academy of Art Cornish College of the Arts
- Known for: Painting
- Notable work: "Aunties" series
- Awards: BP Portrait Award 2012
- Website: www.aleahchapin.com

Aleah Chapin (born March 11, 1986) is an American painter whose direct portrayals of the human form have expanded the conversation around western culture’s representations of the body in art. Described by Eric Fischl as “the best and most disturbing painter of flesh alive today,” Chapin’s work has explored aging, gender and beauty, influenced in part by her upbringing on Whidbey Island.

Chapin holds a BFA from Cornish College of the Arts and an MFA from the New York Academy of Art. She has attended residencies at the Leipzig International Art Program (Germany) and MacDowell (United States). Chapin has exhibited both nationally and internationally at places such as Flowers Gallery (New York, London, Hong Kong), The Belvedere Museum (Austria), and the National Portrait Gallery (London). She has been a recipient of the Promising Young Painters Award from the American Academy of Arts and Letters (New York), the Elizabeth Greenshields Foundation Grant (Canada), a Postgraduate Fellowship from the New York Academy of Art, and won the 2012 BP Portrait Award at the National Portrait Gallery (London). Her work has been published extensively in print and online, and she is a subject in the BBC documentary titled “Portrait of an Artist”. Aleah Chapin lives and works in Seattle, WA.

== Biography ==
Born in Seattle, Washington, Chapin grew up on Whidbey Island, Washington. She studied at the Cornish College of the Arts, before studying for her Masters at the New York Academy of Art (NYAA). She was a postgraduate fellow of the Academy.

While still completing her postgraduate course, Chapin entered the London National Portrait Gallery's 2012 BP Portrait Award exhibition. She beat 2,100 international entries to win first prize for her work Auntie, a painting of a naked middle-aged woman. The prize included £25,000 and a £4000 painting commission to be added to the National Gallery's collection. She was the first female American artist to win the award.

Chapin has painted a series of nude portraits, of women from her home area, whom she describes as "aunties". She paints in oils, using photographs of the subjects as a source. She describes her award winning painting, Auntie, as "a map of her journey through life" with a "personification of strength through an unguarded and accepting presence". Chapin says this work "examines my personal history through the people who have shaped it. On our bodies is left a map of our journey through life. The process of painting these women allowed me a glimpse of that journey and brought me into the present moment of our shared history."

Steps (2012), oil on canvas, 74"x61"

Her first solo exhibition, Aunties Project, at the Flowers Gallery, New York, ran from January to February 2013. Daniel Maidman, reviewing the exhibition for the Huffington Post described her paintings as technically proficient, recognisably NYAA schooled, but marked out by Chapin's vision as she painted "badass naked older women" whose "age and wounds... tell a story". He described Steps, her 2012 painting of a group of 'aunties' as "probably Chapin's most ambitious painting to date", expressing a cartoonish self-confidence similar to the paintings of Rubens. At least one critic has not received Chapin's works well, Brian Sewell called her piece which won the 2012 BP Award a "repellent…a grotesque medical record".

Chapin describes her work as "examin[ing] my personal history through the people who have shaped it. On our bodies is left a map of our journey through life. The process of painting these women allowed me a glimpse of that journey and brought me into the present moment of our shared history."
