= Lionel Smit =

South African artist (born 1982)

Lionel Smit (born 22 October 1982, Pretoria, South Africa) is a South African artist, known for his contemporary portraiture executed through large canvases and sculptures.

Smit lives and works in Cape Town, South Africa, but is also represented internationally in London. His work has been exhibited at the National Portrait Gallery in London where it received the Viewer's Choice Award, He received a Ministerial Award from the South African Department of Culture in 2013 for Visual Art.

== History ==
Born in 1982 in Pretoria, South Africa, Smit was exposed to sculpture through his father Anton Smit, who worked from his studio adjacent to the family home. This studio played a central role in Lionel's upbringing. By age twelve, Smit was already working in clay and considered himself primarily as a sculptor. At sixteen his parents separated, after which Lionel, a student at Pretoria's Pro Arte School of Arts at the time, began to use the empty studio space his father occupied for painting.

== Work and subject matter ==
Lionel Smit's art is defined by a relationship between sculpture and painting.

Smit is based in Strand, South Africa. He has achieved international success including sell-out exhibitions in London and Hong Kong.

== Local acclaim ==
Lionel Smit has also enjoyed success in his home country of South Africa, where his work has featured in local publications such as Elle South Africa and Elle Decoration.

== Qualifications and awards ==
- 2013 Visitors' Choice Award, BP Portrait Award, National Portrait Gallery, London
- 2013 Ministerial Award from Department of Culture for Visual Art, Western Cape Government
- 2009 Merit Award, Vuleka, Sanlam Art Competition, Cape Town
- 2008 Achievement Award, Pro Arte School of Arts
- 2000 First prize in the MTN Art Colours Awards of Gauteng
- 1999/2000 Best painting student, Pro Arte School of Arts

== Selected exhibitions ==
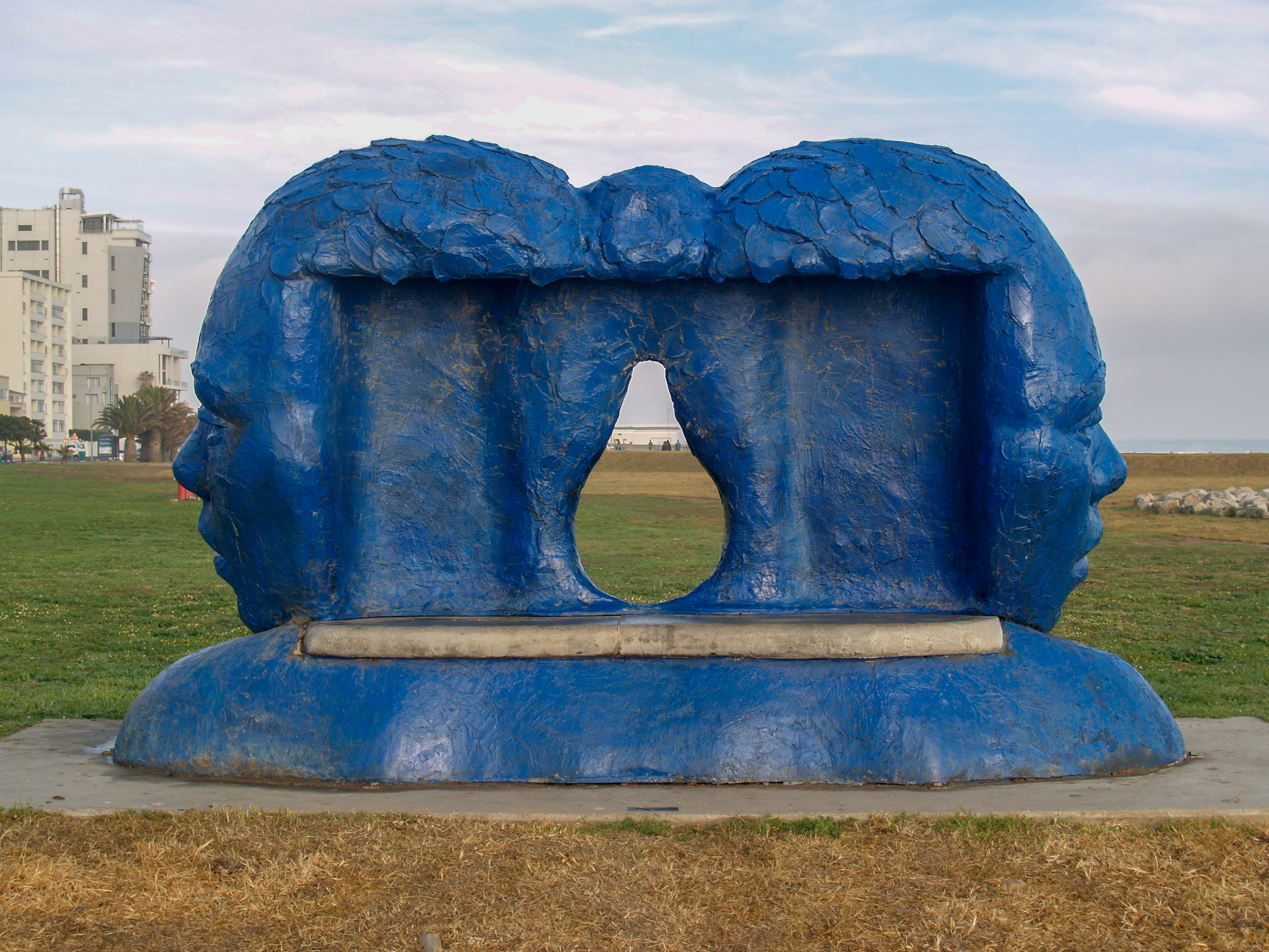
Morphous

2015

- Close/Perspective, solo exhibition, Everard Read, Johannesburg
- Origins, solo exhibition, Rook & Raven, London
- Obscura, solo exhibition, Everard Read, Cape Town
- Art Central Art Fair, featured artist, Rook & Raven Gallery, Hong Kong
- Accumulation of Disorder, installation, Independent Art Projects, MASS MoCA Campus, USA

2014

- Art Taipei, The Cat Street Gallery, Taiwan
- Contronym, solo exhibition, The Cat Street Gallery, Hong Kong
- Morphous, solo exhibition and installation, Circa, Johannesburg
- Cumulus, solo exhibition, Rook & Raven, London
- Fugitive Identity, group exhibition, Cynthia Reeves, USA

2013

- Art Miami Fair, featured artist, Cynthia Reeves, Miami
- IS Sculpture, solo exhibition, IsArt, Tokara, Stellenbosch
- Strarta Art Fair, Saatchi Gallery, Rook & Raven, London
- Fragmented, solo exhibition, Rook & Raven, London
- Accumulation, solo exhibition, Everard Read, Johannesburg
- BP Portrait Award Exhibition, Viewers' Choice Award, National Portrait Gallery, London
- Wonder Works Exhibition, The Cat Street Gallery, Hong Kong
- Metal Work Public sculpture, Stellenbosch

2012

- Compendium, solo exhibition, 34FineArt, Cape Town
- Accumulation of Disorder, installation, University of Stellenbosch Gallery, Stellenbosch
- Strata, solo exhibition, Rook and Raven, London
- Robert Bowman Gallery, India Art Fair, India
- Jhb Art Fair, Everard Read

2011

- Surface, solo exhibition, Artspace, Johannesburg
- 34FineArt, ArtMonaco ‘11, Monaco

2010

- Out of the Office, group exhibition, Kunstmuseum Bochum, Germany
- Cynthia Reeves Projects, Art Miami, USA
- We are not Witches, Saatchi Gallery, London
- Submerge, solo exhibition, 34FineArt, Cape Town

2009

- F.A.C.E.T., Charity Auction, Christie's, London
- Relate, solo exhibition, Grande Provence, Franschhoek

== Catalogues ==
- Cumulus LIONEL SMIT, Rook & Raven, London 2014
- Formulation LIONEL SMIT, Tokara, Stellenbosch 2013
- Accumulation LIONEL SMIT, Everard Read, Johannesburg 2013
- Strata LIONEL SMIT, Rook & Raven, London, 2012
- Surface LIONEL SMIT, Artspace, Johannesburg 2011
- We are not Witches, Saatchi Gallery, London 2011
- Submerge LIONEL SMIT, 34FineArt, October 2010
- Christie's, F.A.C.E.T (catalogue cover), October 2009
- Residue, Grande Provence Gallery, October 2009
- Group therapy, Sandton Civic Gallery, 2005
- Pretoria, Everard Read Gallery, November 2004

== Selected collections ==
- Ellerman Contemporary
- Standard Chartered Bank
- Laurence Graff
- Rand Merchant Bank
- European Investment Bank
- Johannesburg City Council
- Saronsberg Wine Estate
- Grainvest Futures
- Delaire Graff Wine Estate
- South African Embassy, Nigeria
- Parkdev
- Jonathan Jabulani Museum
