= Victoria Russell =

British artist

Victoria Kate Russell (born 1962) is the winner of the National Portrait Gallery's 2000 BP Portrait Award for portrait painting.

Her commissioned portraits have included the Archbishop of Canterbury, Rowan Williams, Dame Shirley Williams, and the Queen of Denmark, HM Margrethe II.
