= Allan Ramsay (portrait painter, born 1959) =

Allan Ramsay (born 1959, Edinburgh) is a painter. He was the winner of the 1988 John Player Portrait Award, subsequently known as the BP Portrait Award.

== Career ==
Allan Ramsay attended figure drawing classes at Edinburgh College of Art between 1978 and 1982, then studied at the Glasgow School of Art from 1982 until 1986. He has also studied at the Art Students League in New York.

In 1988 he was awarded first prize in the John Player Portrait Award / BP Portrait Award at the National Portrait Gallery (London).

As part of this prize he was commissioned to paint the portrait of the English playwright Sir Alan Ayckbourn for the National Portrait Gallery (London), permanent collection,(NPG 6074).
