= Ingolv Helland =

Norwegian portraitist (born 1974)

Ingolv Helland (born 1974) is a Norwegian portraitist who has developed an international reputation.

In the 2007 exhibition for the prestigious BP Portrait Award at the National Portrait Gallery (United Kingdom), Helland's self-portrait was one of only 60 artists selected to participate – out of 1870 entries – and his work was chosen to illustrate both the exhibition's poster and its catalogue.

Helland has an unusual background for a Norwegian portraitist. He prepared for university at St. Mark's School in Southborough, Massachusetts, then took a degree at Amherst College, also in the United States. Following his studies he worked as a bond analyst in New York, while studying drawing at the Art Students League of New York in the evenings and privately with Michael Aviano on the weekends.

In 1997 Helland quit finance to focus on his art. He returned to his native Oslo in 2006.
