= Garrick/Milne Prize =

The Garrick/Milne Prize was a biennial art prize which served to revive the art of theatrical painting and portraiture. The prize was set up by the Garrick Club in memory of A. A. Milne, a past member.

Originally £20,000, the prize was last held in 2005 and has since been replaced by direct commissions.

== 2001 ==
Winner

- Yolanda Sonnabend

Shortlist

- Rob Piercy
- Stuart Pearson Wright (placed 3rd)

== 2003 ==
Winner

- Anna Hyunsook Paik – Anna Hyunsook Paik, Rehearsal at RADA

Shortlist

- Emma Kennaway – Timothy West as King Lear
- Anna Hyunsook Paik – Anna Hyunsook Paik, Rehearsal at RADA
- June Crisfield Chapman – I am not Bid for Love (Henry Goodman as Shylock)
- Helen F. Wilson – Scottish Ballet 11am
- Luke Martineau – Do I Stand There? (placed 2nd)

== 2005 ==
Winner

- Stuart Pearson Wright – Michael Gambon

Shortlist

- Peter Mullan
- Tony Beaver - Tommy Cooper

== See also ==
- List of European art awards
