= Erik Sommer =

American artist

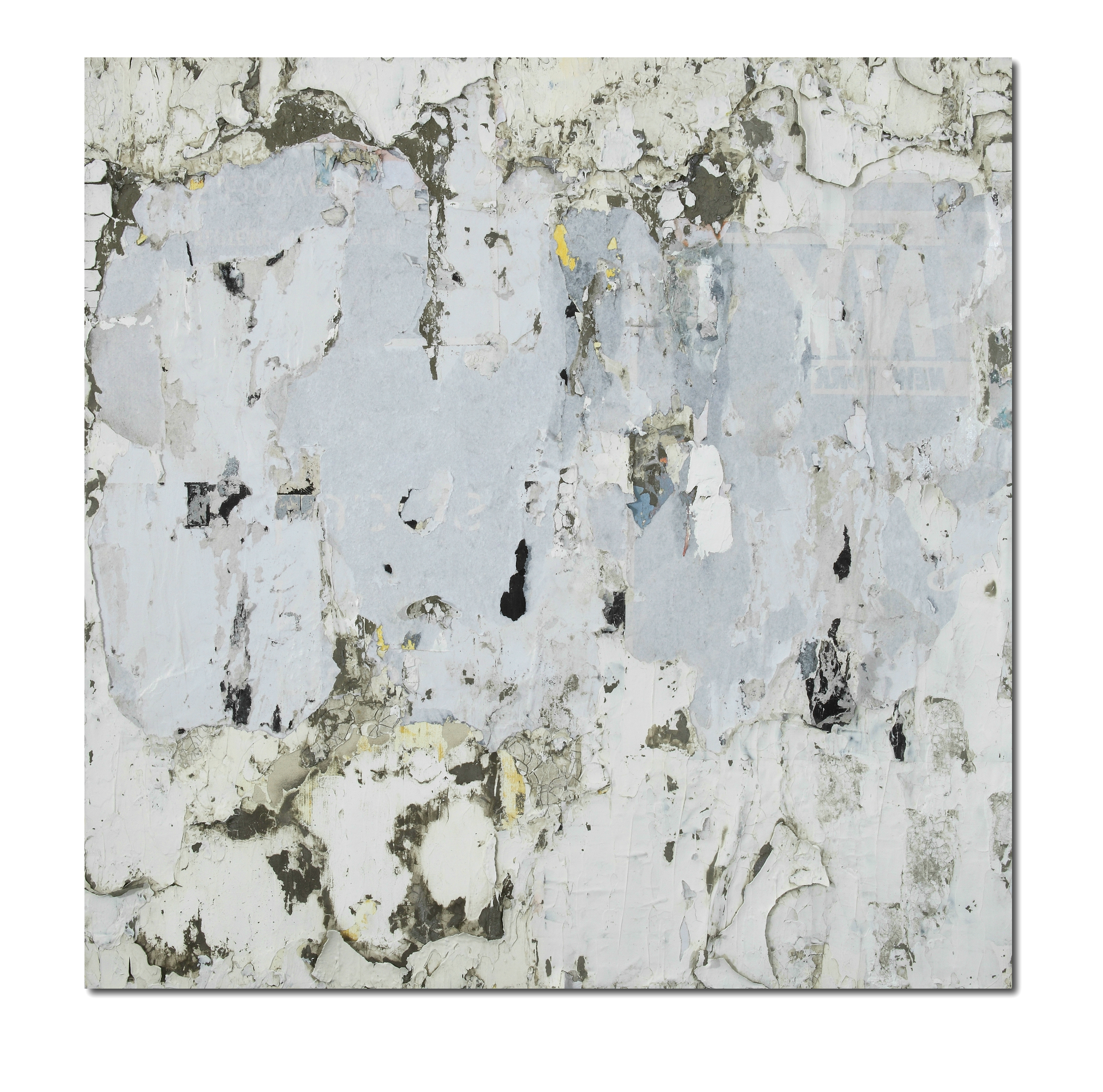
- Paper (2016)
- Born: February 25, 1978 (age 48); Duluth, Minnesota
- Known for: Contemporary Art, Painting, Sculpture

Erik Sommer (born February 25, 1978) is an American contemporary artist and curator based in New York City. Best known for his weathered paintings and cement installations, his work is often compared to abandoned buildings, eroding stone or forgotten structures. The layers of his paintings peel off the supports, while his cement installations recreate scenes that feel to have been recently abandoned.

== Career ==
Sommer has been exhibiting in both solo and group shows since 2010. Pray To Fallen Skies, His first solo UK show, opened at Rook & Raven in London in November 2012. Consisting of large all-white canvases, the work was exhibited in separate viewing rooms; access to these rooms was limited so that viewers could privately immerse themselves with the work.

And Riding Clouds, which opened in New York City in April 2013, featured Sommer's first cement installation. Apt. 4B consisted of found objects collected throughout the city, which were then cemented and arranged to recreate the living room of a New York City apartment. The show was reviewed favorably by Robert C. Morgan in World Sculpture News.

Painting, Interior, a cement installation of a room being painted, was shown in New York in October 2015. In July 2016 Sommer created and exhibited Die Chemische Reining, a cement installation of a dry cleaner, in Berlin. KALTBLUT Magazine, one of Berlin's leading art and fashion magazines, reviewed the show along with an in-depth interview with Sommer.

Sommer's cement installation of a car, Volvo 240, was displayed in Red Hook during the summer of 2017 before being part of the Occupy Mana exhibition at Mana Contemporary.

In May 2018 Sommer first displayed his street poster and drywall paintings at a group show in Bushwick. In September 2018 he presented his newest cement installation, a cemented recreation of a dentist office titled 1 Hour Tooth Whitening, at Deli Grocery in Brooklyn.

In 2019 Sommer founded Mott Projects, a contemporary art project space.

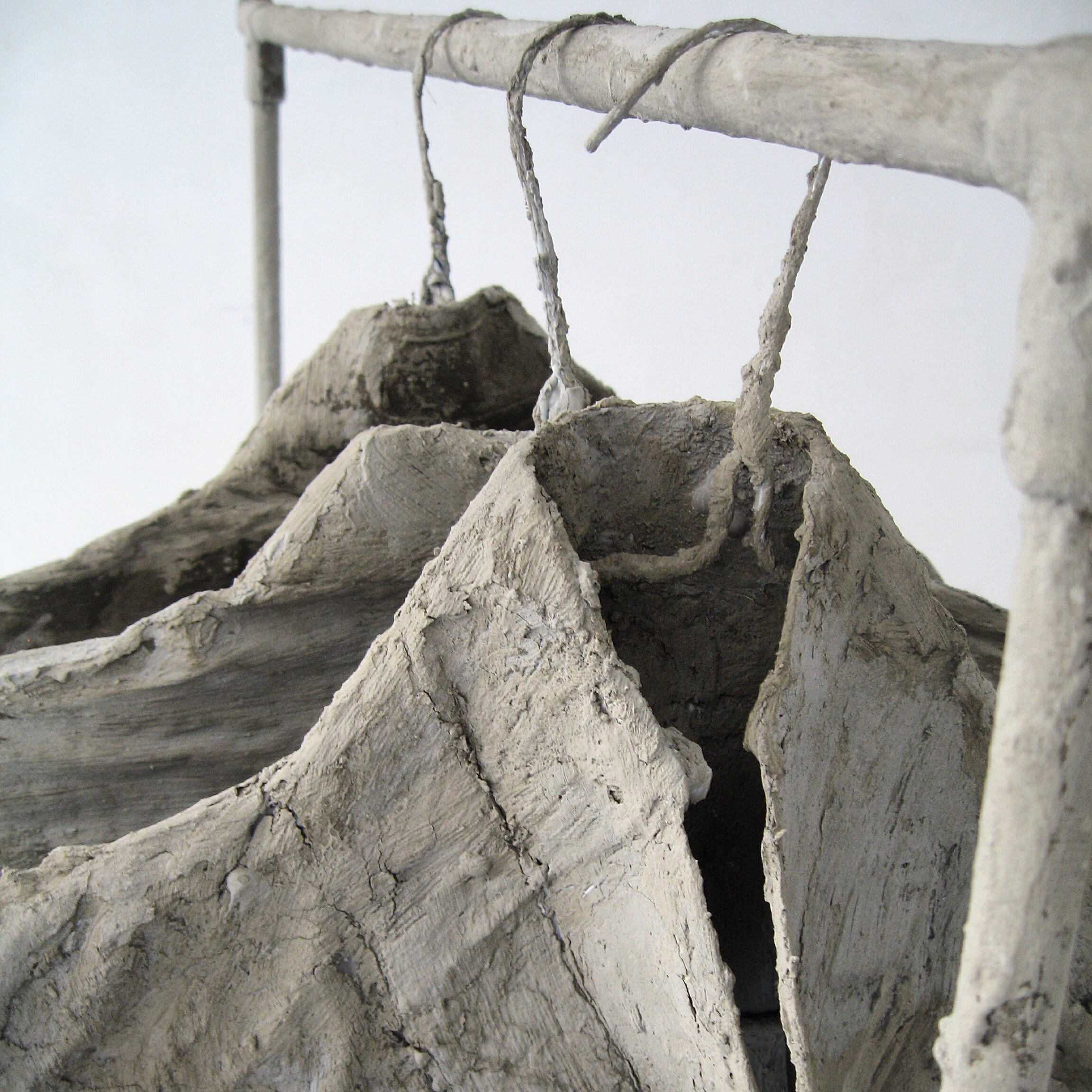
Installation view of Die Chemische Reinigung, (Berlin 2016)
