= Charlotte Harris =

English portrait artist

Charlotte Harris (born 1981 in Ashford, Kent) is a portrait artist who currently works from her studio in Folkestone.

== Biography ==
Untitled by Charlotte Harris, winner of BP Portrait Award in 2003

Harris studied at Leeds Metropolitan University, during which time she worked as a studio assistant for the artist Tom Wood, whose work is featured in the collection of the National Portrait Gallery, London. At the age of 21, she won the BP Portrait Award in 2003 with a painting of her grandmother, described by Director, Sandy Nairne as "extraordinary and telling". She turned professional later that year after graduating with a 1st class Honours degree in Fine Art. The following year she exhibited in the Hunting Art Prize and at the Hart Gallery in Islington, London. The award-winning painting was purchased by Leeds Metropolitan University and is on display in the university buildings.

Harris's first commission was that of Vernon Scannell, writer and poet, who died in November 2007. Recent commissions have included a portrait of Hans Rausing, publisher, anthropologist and philanthropist and founder of the Sigrid Rausing Trust. Harris's portrait of the Rt. Rev. Richard Harries, Bishop of Oxford, was unveiled in April 2006 following a special service to mark the Bishop's retirement. Commissioned to portray the artistic director of the Bavarian State Theatre, Harris's painting of Sir Peter Jonas was unveiled in July 2006 at a ceremony in Munich.

As part of the BP Prize, Harris was commissioned to portray Dame Vivien Duffield and this piece is now part of the National Portrait Gallery's collection.

In 2007 Harris completed two further commissions for the Leeds Metropolitan University – Portrait of Emma Beith outside Carnegie Hall and Portrait of Leanne Creighton, Louise Sweeney and Anne-Marie Watkinson. Both portraits feature outgoing sabbatical officers from the Student Union at the university and were commissioned as part of the celebrations marking the university's centenary year. Harris's most recent commission features Frank Brake, joint-founder of the wholesale food company Brake Bros Ltd.
