= Francesca Mollett =

British abstract painter (born 1991)

- Born: 1991 (age 34–35); Bristol, England
- Education: Wimbledon College of Arts (BA, 2014); Royal Drawing School (2015); Royal College of Art (MA, 2020)
- Known for: Abstract painting
- Movement: Abstract art

Francesca Mollett (born 1991) is a British abstract painter known for her richly layered canvases exploring light, surface, and liminal space. She lives and works in London.

== Early life and education ==
Mollett was born in 1991 in Bristol. She graduated from Wimbledon College of Arts in 2014 with a Bachelor of Arts in Painting. She then studied at the Royal Drawing School in London in 2015, where she developed a sustained interest in abstraction. In 2020, she received her MA in Painting from the Royal College of Art, London. That same year she was awarded the Aidan Threlfall Award for Young Painters.

== Practice ==
Mollett makes abstract paintings that react to space and context. Working primarily in oil on calico canvas and linen, her compositions evolve through a process of extracting and transforming observations, as she analyses the "shifting passages of paint" and the "tension between luminosity and solidity". Her technique ranges from impasto accumulations applied with a palette knife to thinned paint smeared and rubbed across the surface, and large sweeping strokes of colour; preparatory drawings in charcoal, graphite, and watercolour inform her compositions.

Her work is often inspired by sites where light behaves in unusual ways — ancient wells, grottoes, tunnels — as well as by biological phenomena such as phosphorescent moss and the movement of moths. Literature is another persistent influence: emotional events within fiction mediate Mollett's perception of the physical world, particularly when a character's encounter deconstructs their expected reality and expands their sense of connection to their surroundings.

Mollett has described her aim as creating "an image of looking — elements can appear almost recognisable and then dissolve." Critics have noted her work's entanglement of iridescent colour with expressive impasto, and its quality of holding the viewer at a threshold between the legible and the abstract. The Art Newspaper wrote in 2024 that her paintings seem to possess a singular "it factor", marking her as one of the more compelling figures in contemporary British abstraction.

== Career ==
After graduating from the Royal College of Art, Mollett exhibited in the group show London Grads Now at the Saatchi Gallery, London, in 2020. Her first solo exhibition, Wild Shade, was held at Informality Gallery, London, in 2021. A series of international solo exhibitions followed in rapid succession: The Moth in the Moss at Taymour Grahne Projects, London (2022); Spiral Walking at Baert Gallery, Los Angeles (2022); Low Sun at Micki Meng, San Francisco (2023); Halves at GRIMM, Amsterdam (2023); Noon at Pond Society, Shanghai (2023); Corso at GRIMM, New York (2024); Elsewhere at The Warehouse, Dallas (2025); and Annual Honesty at Modern Art, London (2025).

She has also featured in significant group exhibitions, including The Kingfisher's Wing curated by Tom Morton at GRIMM, New York (2022); Considering Female Abstractions at the Green Family Art Foundation, Dallas (2023); New British Abstraction at CICA, Vancouver (2023); and A Room Hung With Thoughts: British Painting Now, curated by Tom Morton, at the Green Family Art Foundation, Dallas (2025).

In 2022 she was represented by GRIMM Gallery (with spaces in Amsterdam, London, and New York), and by Micki Meng in San Francisco. In 2025, she joined Modern Art, the London gallery run by Stuart Shave.

== Collections ==
Mollett's work is held in a number of public and institutional collections, including:

- Dallas Museum of Art
- Green Family Art Foundation, Dallas, TX
- He Art Museum, Foshan, China
- Institute of Contemporary Art, Miami, Miami, FL
- K11 Art Foundation, Hong Kong
- Kröller-Müller Museum, The Netherlands
- Kunstmuseum, The Hague
- Pond Society, Shanghai
- Rachofsky Collection, Dallas, TX
- The Roberts Institute of Art, London
- University of Oxford, St Hilda's College Art Collection

== Selected solo exhibitions ==
Year	Title	Venue
2021	Wild Shade	Informality Gallery, London
2022	The Moth in the Moss	Taymour Grahne Projects, London
2022	Spiral Walking	Baert Gallery, Los Angeles
2023	Low Sun	Micki Meng, San Francisco
2023	Halves	GRIMM, Amsterdam
2023	Noon	Pond Society, Shanghai
2024	Corso	GRIMM, New York
2025	Elsewhere	The Warehouse, Dallas
2025	Annual Honesty	Modern Art, London

== Awards ==
- Aidan Threlfall Award for Young Painters, 2020

== Publications ==
- The Kingfisher's Wing. Essay by Tom Morton. Amsterdam: GRIMM. 2022. ISBN 978-90-831888-7-4.
- Corso. Amsterdam/London/New York: GRIMM. 2024. ISBN 978-90-83328-73-7.
- The Anomie Review of Contemporary British Painting 3. London: Anomie. 2024. ISBN 978-1-910221-59-4.
