= James Lloyd (portrait artist) =

James Lloyd (born 1971) is the 1997 winner of the National Portrait Gallery's BP Portrait Award for portrait painting. Three of his portraits exhibited at the National Portrait Gallery, are:

- Maggie Smith
- David Alec Gwyn Simon, Baron Simon of Highbury
- Sir Paul Smith

He also held the Paul Smith scholarship at the Slade School of Art (1994–96).

References:

1. "James Lloyd - National Portrait Gallery". www.npg.org.uk.
