= Rook & Raven =

Art gallery (2011-2017)

Coordinates: 51°31′0.5″N 0°7′59.3″W

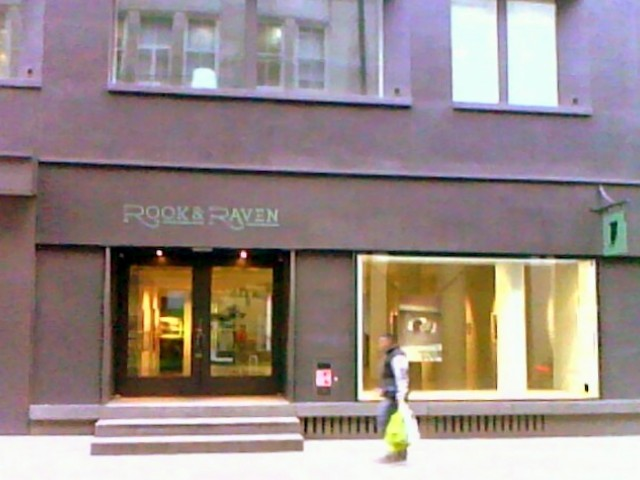
Rook & Raven gallery, London, W1 in 2013

Rook & Raven was a contemporary art gallery based in Fitzrovia, London. It was co-owned by Richard Grindy & Rachelle Lunnon. Opening in 2011, it closed in 2017.

== Artists ==
Artists previously shown at Rook & Raven:

- Noma Bar
- Alexis Dahan
- Sarm Derbois
- Camilla Emson
- Corinne Felgate
- Vanessa Garwood
- Manuel Larralde
- Dale Vn Marshall
- Rupert Newman
- Laurence Owen
- William Roper-Curzon
- Lionel Smit
- Erik Sommer
- Bill Wyman (photographs re-worked by artists)
- Vivien Zhang
