= Dan Llywelyn Hall =

Contemporary artist

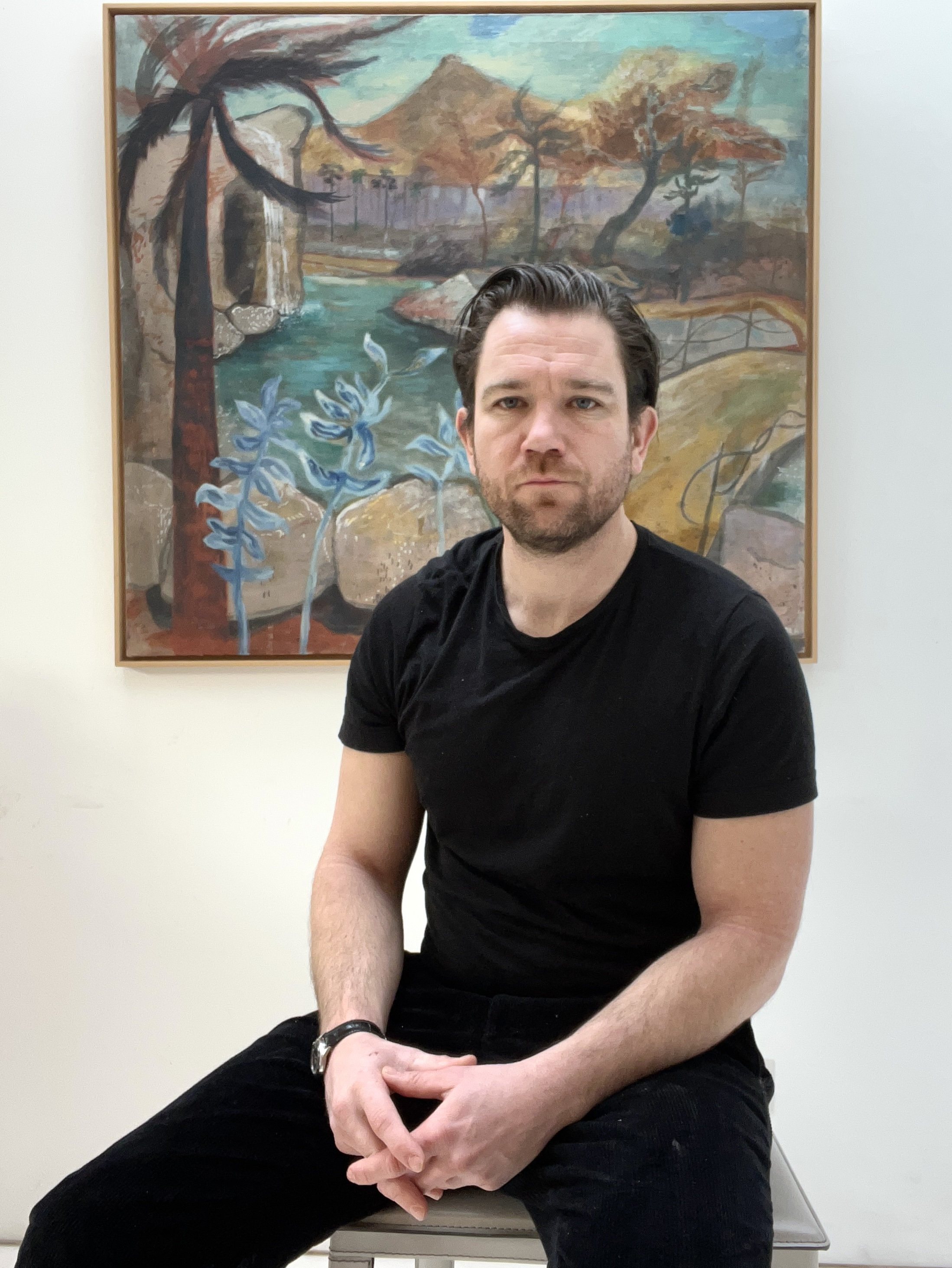
Hall in 2023

Dan Llywelyn Hall (born 1980) is a Welsh artist. who grew up in Barry, South Wales. Known for his landscapes and portrait paintings, Hall has exhibited throughout the UK in public galleries such as the National Portrait Gallery with his portrait The Last Tommy. In 2013 he was commissioned by the WRU to paint a portrait of Queen Elizabeth II, becoming the 133rd artist to sit portray her.

== Early life and education ==
Dan Llywelyn Hall was born in 1980 and grew up in Barry, South Wales.

== Career ==
Hall is known for both his landscapes and portrait paintings, and his work has been exhibited widely across the UK.

In 2009 the artist had a sitting in Bath and made a portrait of the last surviving 'Tommy' veteran of WW1, Harry Patch. This portrait, titled The Last Tommy, was exhibited at the National Portrait Gallery in London.

Dan Llywelyn Hall became the 133rd artist to officially paint a portrait of Queen Elizabeth II, titled Icon and commissioned by the Welsh Rugby Union.

In 2014, Hall's portrait of Prince William was unveiled in the Wales Office by the Secretary of State for Wales, David Jones.

For the 75th anniversary of the Dambusters Raid in 2018, he made 133 portraits of all the men who participated in the mission.

In 2022, Hall attended the Queen's funeral procession and depicted it in the Queen's Procession in Real Time. In 2024, his exhibition called The Reign featured portraits of Richard III, Mary I, Henry VI, Æthelstan, Llywelyn ab Iorwerth, Prince Harry (depicted as Bonnie Prince Charlie), and Meghan, Duchess of Sussex (depicted as Elizabeth Woodville).

In 2016 he painted a portrait of Barbara Windsor, titled An East End Girl. Windsor unveiled it at L'Escargot, London.

Hall also made a portrait of pop singer Marc Almond, which Almond unveiled in 2019.

In 2021, Hall completed an exhibition and book Walking with Offa / Cerdded gydag Offa - a collaboration with poets including Gillian Clarke, Menna Elfyn, Owen Sheers and Ifor ap Glyn.

In September 2023 a portrait of Owain Glyndwr was unveiled at Sycharth - the family home of the Welsh prince.

== Recognition and awards ==
In 2009 Hall was one of 51 exhibitors in the 2009 BP Portrait Award with The Last Tommy.

In 2015, Hall became the first artist-in-residence at the Cannes Film Festival.

== Campaigning ==
In 2017, Hall led a campaign to save Sheffield Street Trees in which he depicted some of the trees under threat.

In 2018, Hall was invited to support the anti-HS2 campaign which threatened Euston Square Gardens.

In 2021, Hall was involved in a campaign to save parts of Offa's Dyke.

In 2023, he prominently supported a campaign to save the ancestral home of Welsh leader Owain Glyndŵr, a castle named Sycharth in Montgomeryshire. Owain was the last holder of the title Prince of Wales to be born in Wales.

== Public collections ==
The Royal Collection with The Last Tommy (Harry Patch), and The Last Volunteer (Henry Allingham), both veterans of WW1.

MoMA Wales acquired Fan-Hir for its permanent collection in 2005.

The National Library of Wales has 25 items by or related to Hall.

The Contemporary Art Society for Wales has an oil painting by Hall, The Wreckage of Carnedd Llewellyn.

The National Museum of Wales has a drawing of Harry Patch entitled ‘The Last Tommy - Study for Harry Patch’ by Hall
