= Anthony Howell =

Anthony Howell may refer to:

- Anthony Howell (actor) (born 1971), English actor
- Anthony Howell (footballer) (born 1986), English footballer
- Anthony Howell (performance artist) (born 1945), English poet, novelist and performance artist.
- Anthony Howell (admiral) (born 1947), South African Navy officer

== See also ==
- Anthony Howells (1832–1915), American businessman and politician
- Toney Howell, involved in the 1912 Racial Conflict of Forsyth County, Georgia
