= Wim Heldens =

Dutch realist painter (born 1954)

- Born: 29 March 1954 (age 72); Sittard, Netherlands
- Website: http://www.wimheldens.com/

Wim Heldens (born March 29, 1954) is a prominent Dutch contemporary realist painter known for his highly detailed, psychologically complex figurative paintings and portraits. Born in Sittard, Netherlands, he has spent much of his career based in Amsterdam, with significant periods spent working in the USA.

Heldens occupies a space in the contemporary art world by blending Renaissance techniques and 17th-century Dutch treatment of light (inspired by Vermeer, Ter Borch and Metsu ) with modern, everyday imagery.

== Biography ==
=== Early life ===
Wim Heldens was born in Sittard in the catholic south of the Netherlands. Heldens grew up in a household where from a young age he was artistically influenced by his parents and surrounded by paintings, books on art and music. His parents were not comfortable with the idea of their own son pursuing an artistic career. The friendship with the son of a local artist, Alphons Winters, brought Heldens in contact with the local artistic community. Winters and his family lived in a large house filled with paintings, sculptures and art objects from artists like Charles Eyck, Hans Truijen and Jan Sluyters, many of whom would pay visits on a regular basis. This artistic environment had a great influence on the young artist. It was the painter Tine Wesseling (the wife of poet Bertus Aafjes) who first recognized his talent, her encouragement (and an oil-paint-kit his parents gave him for his 17th birthday) definitively set him on his course to become a painter. He experimented in oil paint with every possible painting style he had been exposed to, discovering around the age of 18 that painting the human figure in a realistic way was his true calling.

=== Amsterdam ===
In 1972, at the age of 18, Wim Heldens moved to Amsterdam. In the following years he applied to various art academies in the Netherlands, but was never accepted. He tried once more at the academy in Frankfurt where he was immediately accepted, but he decided to go his own way. In the following years he concentrated intensely on painting, locking himself up in his studio, working in isolation on improving his skills. Various trips to Italy were a great stimulation; the greatest impression from these years was the psychologically dramatic work of Caravaggio. Making a living from portrait commissions, Heldens developed this genre as a means to explore the human condition. While around him the modernist revolution was gradually being accepted as a general norm, Heldens explored renaissance techniques and three- and two-dimensional form, including abstract structural patterns. Also, the treatment of light by masters of Dutch 17C painting like Johannes Vermeer, Gerard Ter Borch and Nicolaes Maes held his fascination.

=== USA ===
By 1990, Heldens started feeling restricted in the small Dutch art community and at the end of that year he went to New York City where he found a different artistic climate with a more positive appreciation for his work, in contrast to the general feedback he received in the Netherlands, where only appreciation for his painting skills came his way. In contrast, Americans were genuinely intrigued by the psychological and the narrative qualities of Heldens’ work.

New York City became his major focus and he tried to spend as much time there as he possibly could, blending in the American artistic community, where he met American artists like Jack Beal and Charles Bell. He painted various portraits in commission, among others for the collector Raymond Saroff, who possesses an impressive collection of American native art.

From 2004 to 2019 Wim Heldens divided his time between Amsterdam and the United States where he kept a studio with his American partner who has been the leading character in most of his narrative paintings since 2004. He started experimenting to integrate narrative elements in portraits, finding creative ways to paint portraits in commission, while avoiding the stifling restrictions that traditional portraiture can present.

=== Amsterdam, London and Barcelona ===
Heldens had never seriously considered his legal status as a visitor in the USA and in July 1995, when he was returning once more to NYC, he was arrested at JFK Airport for having violated the visa waiver program of U.S. Immigration and he was forced back to Amsterdam.

On returning to Amsterdam, Heldens began to focus on London and in 1998 his painting “Blue Hair & Braces” was selected for the annual exhibition of The Royal Society of Portrait Painters at The Mall Galleries in London, winning the Menena Joy Schwab Award; that summer the painting was on show in The National Portrait Gallery. The painting was later purchased by the Arnot Art Museum in Elmira NY for their permanent collection. Around that time he decided to move away from portrait commissions to be able to concentrate upon a more versatile expression of human drama in contemporary life and began to submit his paintings successfully to various art competitions in London, Spain and Italy. His paintings began to find their way into private collections in the Netherlands, United Kingdom, Germany Turkey, Taiwan and the United States, and into collections of the Academic Hospital and, the Bank Nederlandse Gemeenten in The Hague , The municipal theater in Haarlem NL and the City Council in Sittard.

=== Focus on the Human Condition ===
Heldens is primarily fascinated by human drama and the "underdog." His work frequently captures ordinary people, youth culture, and marginalized individuals in quiet, ambiguous, or socially charged settings. He uses the genre to explore psychological states, isolation, and empathy.

A central element of Heldens' recent work is his collaboration with his frequent model and muse, Musanje, a gay refugee from Uganda.

Musanje has served as the central model for many of Heldens' paintings since that period. His work with Musanje explores themes of identity and presence, often placing the model in symbolic settings that address contemporary human vulnerability.

== Awards and exhibitions ==
- In 1983 he had his first solo-exhibition in Museum Het Kritzraedthuis in his hometown Sittard. Later that year he got a solo-exhibition in Museum Aemstelle in Amstelveen. In 1986 he participated in the exhibition Contemporary Portraiture in the Netherlands in The Singer Museum in Laren. Later, he painted portraits of Egbert van Paridon (founder of the theater company Centrum) and Dutch actors Nelly Frijda and Antonie KamerlingHans Cornelissen, Nelly Frijda, Antonie Kamerling, and human rights activist Sylvana Simons.
- In 1990, he saw his first painting on show in the Henoch Gallery in SoHo, a self-portrait.
- In 1995 Heldens participated in the exhibition ‘Representation Represented’ in the Arnot Art Museum in Elmira (NY) together with Janet Fish, Gregory Gillespie, Paul Cadmus, Claudio Bravo and Michael Leonard, where Heldens’ contribution drew much attention.
- Heldens won the Menena Joy Schwabe Award, held in The Mall Galleries in London in 1998.
- Though initially rejected by Dutch art academies early in his career for pursuing realism during the height of the modernist movement, Heldens went on to exhibit and win awards internationally.
- He won the BP Portrait Award at the National Portrait Gallery, London for his painting Distracted, which led to a commission to paint British philanthropists Sir Harry and Lady Carol Djanogly.
- He won the first prize in the ModPortrait competition in Barcelona, Spain, for his painting ''Jajja'' (Grandmother), which is now housed in the permanent collection of the Museu Europeu d'Art Modern (MEAM).
- His work has been exhibited numorous times in The Figurativas Exhibition MEAM Barcelona and The ModPortrait competition in Spain.
- The Male Muse, exhibition Gallery MooiMan Groningen NL 2026.
- The Refugee as Muse, exhibition in WG Gallery in Dordrecht NL 2020.
- Exhibition Pulchri Studios The Hague NL 2024
- Love Stories from The National Portrait Gallery London, Amsterdam NL, Worcester Massachusetts USA, Naples Florida USA 2023
- The Harmony Of Vision Exhibition curated by ArteLibre, Taipei Taiwan, Hong Kong China, Zaragosa Spain, 2026

== Sources ==
- Wim Heldens' site
- GoFigurative site of Heldens
- Gibbons, E. (2011). 100 Artists of the Male Figure: A Contemporary Anthology of Painting, Drawing, and Sculpture. Shiffer Publishing, Atglen, PA. 244 pages. ISBN 9780764336935
- De Wereld Draait Door episode about Wim Heldens (Dutch)
- Seesle account of Heldens
- WG Gallery – Wim Heldens
- Gallery MooiMan – Wim Heldens
- Fikva Art – Meet Artist Wim Heldens
- Grand Masters Fine Art – Wim Heldens
- Wim Heldens – YouTube
- Wim Heldens: Heroes – Vrolijk
- Wim Heldens – YouTube
- Kunstenaar Magazine – Wim Heldens
- BP Portrait Award 2011 – National Portrait Gallery
- Wim Heldens – YouTube
- RTV Dordrecht – Wim Heldens video
- Love Stories Exhibition – Baker Museum Naples
