= Stuart Pearson Wright =

English portrait artist

Stuart Pearson Wright (born 1975) is an English artist, known principally for his portraits, Wright also works in sculpture, film and printmaking. He is first prize winner of the 2001 BP Portrait Award.

== Early life and education ==
Stuart Pearson Wright was born in 1975, and went to school in Eastbourne, Sussex. He studied at the Slade School of Fine Art from 1995 to 1999.

== Career ==
When Wright was 25 the National Portrait Gallery acquired his painting of the actor John Hurt. The NPG also holds a pencil drawing of actress Parminder Nagra created by him in 2004, as well as a number of other British actors including Jeremy Irons, Timothy Spall, Daniel Radcliffe, Nonso Anozie and Alan Rickman.

An exhibition of his work entitled Halfboy was on show at The Heong Gallery of Downing College, Cambridge from 2 November 2018 to 6 February 2019.

He was the featured artist in the first episode of the second series of the BBC TV series Extraordinary Portraits, where he painted a portrait of fundraiser and cancer survivor Harriet Middleton. He subsequently donated the painting to Shetland Museum.

Wright was commissioned in 2021 by then HRH The Prince of Wales to paint the portrait of Ruzena Levy for the Seven Portraits: Surviving the Holocaust series unveiled in 2022 at the Queen's Gallery in Buckingham Palace.

Wright is currently represented by Flowers Gallery London and had a solo exhibition there in November 2023 called Miscellanalects.

== Awards ==
Wright won the BP Travel Prize in 1998.

In 2001 he won the BP Portrait Award with his painting of six presidents of the National Academy. It was described as "astounding", showing the men surrounding a dead chicken. As part of his prize he was commissioned to paint author J. K. Rowling, and that painting is part of the National Collection.

Wright won the Garrick/Milne Prize in 2005.

== Personal life ==
Wright was conceived by artificial insemination, and grew up not knowing his father. However in 2019, following a DNA test, Wright discovered the identity of his Father, made contact and was received warmly. He has now been fully assimilated into his paternal family.

He is divorced and has a son and a daughter.

He is the cousin of the novelist Gavin William Wright
