= Norbert Lynton =

British art historian

Norbert Casper Lynton OBE (Berlin, Germany, 22 September 1927 – 30 October 2007, Brighton, England) was Professor of the History of Art at the University of Sussex. From 1998 to 2006 he was Chairman of the Charleston Trust.

He published on architecture and on modern artists including Paul Klee, Ben Nicholson and William Scott. With Erika Langmuir he co-authored the Yale Dictionary of Modern Art. Among his significant works are The Story of Modern Art, published by Phaidon Press, and the introduction for the book that accompanied the major international exhibition "Painting the Century: 101 Portrait Masterpieces 1900–2000" held at the National Portrait Gallery in London to celebrate the millennium.

Lynton finished a book about the Russian painter and architect Vladimir Tatlin shortly before his death. A further publication on the work of Bernard Cohen appeared posthumously in 2009. He left four sons: Jeremy, Oliver, Thomas and Peter.
