= Christina Kimeze =

Visual Artist

Christina Kimeze (born 1986) is a British artist who lives and works in London.

== Education ==
Kimeze graduated from The Royal Drawing School in London in 2022. Prior to this, Kimeze completed an undergraduate degree in Biological Sciences from the University of Oxford, UK.

== Work ==
Kimeze has said of her work: ‘I return to the idea of this intimate inner life and how we spend most of our lives just with ourselves and with our own thoughts.’ Her work has been described as focused on lone female subjects, and the "joys of solitude".

In 2025 Kimeze had her first institutional solo exhibition at South London Gallery, UK where she brought together a new series of paintings and works on paper. Originally inspired by the resurgence of roller skating in Black communities, the works explored ideas of freedom, flight and escape, particularly from a female perspective.

In 2024, her work was included in the Soulscapes show at the Dulwich Picture Gallery, London.

In 2026, Kimeze was included in the British Art Show 10 curated by Ekow Eshun, that started in Coventry, touring venues in Swansea, Bristol, Sheffield and Newcastle until 2028.

=== Solo Exhibitions ===
- 2025 Hauser & Wirth, "Christina Kimeze. Long loops", Los Angeles CA
- 2025 South London Gallery, "Christina Kimeze. Between Wood and Wheel", London, UK
- 2023 White Cube, "Something other than the world might know'" Paris, France

== Awards ==
In 2022 Kimeze was awarded the Sir Denis Mahon Award.

== Publications ==
- Eshun, Ekow, Nairne, Eleanor, 'Christina Kimeze', London: South London Gallery, 2025, ill. (exh. cat.)
- Royal Drawing School (ed.), 'The Power of Drawing', London: Royal Drawing School, 2025, pp. 70–71, ill. (exh. cat.)
- Anderson, Lisa, 'Soulscapes', London: Dulwich Picture Gallery, 2024, p. 108, ill. (exh. cat.)
