= Ben Jamie =

British painter based in London (born 1978)

Benjamin Jamie (born 1978) is a British painter based in London. He was educated at the University of Gloucestershire and the Ecole Cantonale D'Art Du Valais in Sierre, Switzerland. He completed 2 years on the Turps Banana Painting Programme in London.

He was one of the five Prizewinners for the John Moores Painting Prize 2016.
