= Robin Warwick Gibson =

Canadian historian and academic

Robin Warwick Gibson OBE (3 May 1944 – 9 August 2010) was a British gallery curator and art historian best known for his work at the National Portrait Gallery in London between 1968 and 2001, including eight years as Chief Curator. He was responsible for many innovations in the management of the gallery and published a number of significant academic works on the gallery's collections during his career.

== Life ==
Gibson was born in 1944 near Hereford and educated at Wychcrest Preparatory School and at New College Choir School Oxford, the Royal Masonic School before reading Modern Languages and a second degree in Fine Arts at Magdalene College, Cambridge. After a brief period at the Manchester City Art Gallery, Gibson joined the National Portrait Gallery as an assistant curator in 1968 and was almost immediately involved in the establishment of the photographic department, the role of which he would significantly develop and expand during his career. In 1975 he was involved in the establishment of Montacute House as an outstation of the Gallery.

In 1983, Gibson became curator of twentieth century collections and reinvigorated the collections by expanding the use of photography, contemporary sculpture and film in the gallery's collections and redesigning many of the galleries. He also began the practice of commissioning paintings of living figures by contemporary artists, stating that "Representational painting is not so central any more to current artistic concerns: there is not the same social structure, nor the patrons to encourage the artists. We are much more interested in the psychological aspect of portraiture now." This occasionally led him into controversy, such as when the gallery's board of trustees rejected a portrait of Alan Bennett by Tom Wood in 1992 to the embarrassment of all concerned.

In 1994, Gibson was made Chief Curator and remained in post until 2001. In 2000 he curated 'Painting the Century: 101 Portrait Masterpieces 1900–2000', writing the book, with an introduction by Norbert Lynton that accompanied the exhibition. He published numerous reference works on art history, including examinations of animals in portraiture and several studies of painting in the twentieth century, and contributed to the Dictionary of National Biography, Folio, The Independent, Modern Painters & the Museums Journal. Gibson settled in Hempstead, Essex and became involved with the Fry Art Gallery. He was a keen gardener, cook and amateur composer, pianist and organist. He was predeceased by his partner of over 40 years, Tom Gligoroff, repetiteur and pianist. Gibson was survived by his sister Hilary Gibson and his second recent partner, Hitesh Mistry.

== Books and catalogues ==
- Catalogue of exhibition of paintings from the Collection of Dr. D. M. McDonald, foreword by Roy Strong, 1970
- British Portrait Painters, by Robin Gibson and Keith Roberts , 1971
- The Masque of beauty, National Portrait Gallery, 1972
- Flower Painting, 1976
- The Clarendon Collection, Paul Mellon Centre, 1977
- 20th Century Portraits, 1978
- Glyn Philpot, 1984
- William Roberts, an artist and his family, 1984
- John Bellany : new portraits, the Maxi/Hudson Collection, National Portrait Gallery, London, 1986
- Glyn Philpot, 1884–1937: Edwardian Aesthete to Thirties Modernist, National Portrait Gallery, London 1986
- Paolozzi portraits, with an essay by Robin Spencer, National Portrait Gallery, 1988
- Lewis Morley photographer of the sixties, foreword by Robin Gibson, with essays by Terence Pepper and David Mellor, National Portrait Gallery, 1989
- Contemporary Poets, Portraits By Peter Edwards, A National portrait Gallery Exhibition, 1990. Foreword by Robin Gibson Curator 20th Century Collection. The ISBN printed in the document (0855140314) is invalid, causing a checksum error.
- Madame Yevonde : Colour, fantasy and myth, by Robin Gibson and Pam Roberts, 1990
- John Bratby Portraits, 1991
- The Portrait Now, 1993
- The Sitwells, 1994
- Glenys Barton by Adrian Flowers, Robin Gibson, Edward Lucie-Smith; foreword by Charles Saumarez Smith; introduction by Robert Heller, 1997
- Michael Taylor by Robin Gibson, 1997
- Panayiotis Kalorkoti : heads, faces and figures, catalogue essay by Robin Gibson, 1998. ISBN 0-905974-71-9
- The Face in the Corner, 1998; new edition: Pets in Portraits, introduction by Chris Packham, 2015
- Painting the Century: 101 Portrait Masterpieces 1900–2000, 2000
- Stephen Finer : paintings, 2004
