= Marty St. James =

Marty St. James (born 1954) is a British performance artist and professor of fine art in the School Art and Design at the University of Hertfordshire. He is perhaps best known for his portrait of Olympic swimmer Duncan Goodhew: The Swimmer – commissioned in 1990 by the National Portrait Gallery – and recently migrated to new digital formats. He studied at the Bournville College of Art.

HTV Television recorded and presented his graduation piece 'Mr and Mrs' (1976) with his then wife Mary, the piece and his early life also feature in The Guardian article 'Mr and Mrs Avant Garde: art's real-life couples'.

The Swimmer is a seminal moment in video. Its use of time and fragmentation employing the analogue methodologies and equipment, which were the only ones available in 1990, and the site sensitive sculptural qualities of its installation predicting contemporary developments in video installation. In a process the artist describes as ‘sculpture in time’ his multi–channel video installations capture his subjects in a ‘sliver of time’ – moving yet frozen for all eternity, self-consciously entrapped by the technological paraphernalia, which a video work requires to deliver its message.

St. James is a member of the 'Centre for Research in Electronic Art and Communication' part of the 'Fine Art Practices Group'. In 1984 he contributed to Video Art: the early years with a performance for the British/Canadian Video Exchange, A Space / ARC, Toronto.

In 2007 his multi-monitor video art installation, The Swimmer (sitter: Olympian Duncan Goodhew) was added to the primary collection of the UK's National Portrait Gallery, the video portraits of works Julie Walters and Sally Burgess are in the gallery's reference collection.

St. James was a judge in the art category for the UK-Japan Art Design Film Award in 2010. UK-Japan Art Design Film Award 2010.

In 2012 he had his second exhibition in China at the Iron Curtain Gallery.
