= Zsuzsi Roboz =

Hungarian artist (1929–2012)

- Self portrait
- Born: August 15, 1929; Budapest, Hungary
- Died: July 9, 2012 (aged 82); London, United Kingdom
- Known for: Painting

Zsuzsi Roboz (15 August 1929 – 9 July 2012) was a London-based Hungarian painter known for her portraiture paintings and paintings of the arts. Her work is in public galleries including the Tate Britain and The National Portrait Gallery.

== Early life ==
Zsuzsi Roboz was born in Budapest. Her father, Imre Roboz, was the manager of the Comedy Theatre of Budapest (Vígszínház theatre), which specialised in operettas. Her mother, Edith Roboz, was a society hostess.

As an only child, Roboz was raised largely by governesses and saw little of her parents. The Sunday morning walks with her parents were reportedly a happy memory for Roboz as they were among the few times she could talk to her parents, especially her father.

During the 1930s, Roboz felt a change in Hungary as right-wing ideas became more prominent, especially with Nazi Germany invading Hungary's former sister state Austria in 1938. Eventually, the liberal arts fell out of favour and Roboz's father, Imre, was deprived of his job which resulted in him handing it over to a friend, writer Harsanyi Zsolt. It was soon necessary for Imre to go into hiding, shortly followed by Roboz and her mother being moved to a separate accommodation. They heard very little of Imre and was eventually declared dead, although his body was never found.

According to The Times, after the occupation of Hungary Imre was eventually forced to a concentration camp where he had been reported dead. However, different articles state different causes of Imre’s death, no one is certain of how he actually passed. Zsuzsi and her mother were hidden by a neighbour and eventually crossed the Danube where they were rescued by the Americans.

After the war, the pair moved to France as her mother had remarried a Frenchman, but Zsuzsi found life in France difficult and left for secretarial school in London at the age of seventeen. After arriving in London in 1947, she worked for an old friend of her fathers, Alexander Korda, an active and well-known figure in cinema, as a typist and occasional dinner guest with celebrities such as John Garfield.

It was during this time that Roboz attended art classes at the Royal Academy Schools under the supervision of Peter Greenham, and would later catch the eye of Pietro Annigoni. She later left to study in Italy as Annigoni’s pupil and upon returning to London after the year was up, she was considered a “brilliant draughtsman.” Roboz married the commercial artist Ley Kenyon in 1953, but the relationship was short-lived.

== Career ==
Best known for her portraits of dancers, musicians and writers Roboz regarded herself as "a painter who sometimes painted portraits, rather than a specialist in the genre.” Her other interests included series on music and the ballet. In 1972 she was commissioned to do a series of portraits for the 10th anniversary of Chichester Festival Theatre in 1972, where her second husband, Alfred T. (Teddy) Smith was employed.

After her second independent show, she caught the attention of Jacques O’Hana, an art dealer from Mayfair who took her on as a recurring artist. Although by then she had become relatively well known in the art world, she still wanted to further her artistic skills and travelled thoroughly, from places like the Dalmatian Coast to Hong Kong.

By the mid-1990s, she had developed a symbolist style which can be seen in her series Spirit of Nature, and also in her final series, Face to Face (2011), a portraiture series of British and Irish writers that went beyond realism. The series was dedicated to not only showcasing these writers but capturing their creative aura to celebrate their works that made them who they are.

Among her other stylistic choices, Messum’s describes her work as ranging from “sensual drawings to oils which hint at the surreal absurdity of life’s experiences.”

=== Exhibition highlights ===
1956 Commissions from Sir Alexander Korda of Claire Bloom and Mary Ure, the beginning of a series of portraits of his contract artists.

1958 Solo exhibition at the Walker Galleries, London.

1960 Solo exhibition at the André Weil Gallery, Paris.

1963 Solo exhibition at the Upper Grosvenor Gallery, London.

1963 Commissioned to paint Barnwell Manor, the home of the Duke and Duchess of Gloucester, as a gift to the late Prince William of Gloucester, establishing a long-standing association with the family.

1964 Invited by Sheila Van Damm, owner of the Windmill Theatre, to work backstage to capture its “last days”.

1965 Exhibition of the Windmill drawings at the Upper Grosvenor Gallery, London.

1967 Solo exhibition at the O’Hana Gallery, London.

1968 Solo exhibition at the André Weil Gallery, Paris.

1970 Solo exhibition at the O’Hana Gallery, London, in conjunction with the publication of her first book, Women and Men’s Daughters.

1973 Solo exhibition at the O’Hana Gallery, London.

1975 Publication of “Chichester 10, Portrait of a Decade”.

1976 Solo exhibition at the Hong Kong Arts Festival. Began sketching backstage at the ballet.

1977 Solo exhibition of lithographs at the Curwen Gallery, London.

1978 “Revuedeville” exhibition at the Victoria & Albert Museum, London, of the Windmill sketches and lithographs, now in the Museum’s permanent collection.

1979 Commissioned by the Theatre Museum of the Victoria & Albert Museum to do a theatre card of ballet movements. Solo exhibition of large drawings of the ballet at the Hamilton Gallery, London.

1980 Solo exhibition of paintings at l’Horizon Gallery, Brussels. Publication of “British Ballet Today”. “Moments of Life” exhibition at the Patrick Seale Gallery, London.

1981 Solo exhibition at the Piccadilly Festival of Arts, London. Commissioned by H.R.H. Princess Alice, Duchess of Gloucester, to draw her portrait on the occasion of her 80th birthday.

1982 Portrait of Dame Ninette de Valois enters the permanent collection of the National Portrait Gallery, London. Portraits of Sir Frederick Ashton and Lord Olivier enter the permanent collection of the Victoria & Albert’s Theatre Museum, London.

1983 “Drawn to Ballet” solo exhibition at the Royal Festival Hall, London.

1984 Invited by Hungary’s Minister of Culture to be a guest of honour at the Spring Festival in Budapest. Three life-size drawings of the ballet purchased for the permanent collection at the Royal Festival Hall. Solo exhibition at Quinton Green Fine Art, Cork Street, London. Exhibited at the Bath Festival of Contemporary Art.

1985 Solo exhibition during the Spring Festival at the Hungarian State Opera’s Erkel Theatre, Budapest. Painting of Antal Doràti is presented by the Royal Philharmonic Orchestra for permanent display at the Royal Festival Hall.

1987 Exhibition at the Dyansen Gallery, Los Angeles. “Music Makers” solo exhibition at the Royal Festival Hall, London.

1988 Solo exhibition during the Spring Festival at the Vigado Gallery, Budapest.

1989 Solo exhibition at the Lincoln Center, New York.

1991 Exhibited at ICAF, London.

1992 Portrait of Lucian Freud exhibited at the Royal Academy, London.

1993 Solo exhibition at Art 93 at the Business Design Centre in conjunction with the publication of her book, “British Art Now”, text by Edward Lucie-Smith and published by Art Books International.

1993 Solo exhibition at The Mall Galleries.

1994 Solo exhibition at The Roy Miles Gallery.

1995 Spirit of Nature Exhibition – solo exhibition at The David Messum Gallery, Cork Street, London W1.

1997 Solo exhibition at The David Messum Gallery, Cork Street, London W1.

1999 20th Century Illusions – solo exhibition at The David Messum Gallery, Cork Street, London W1.

2000 Solo exhibition at Messum’s, Cork Street, London W1.

2002 Solo exhibition at Messum’s, Cork Street, London W1.

2005 Solo exhibition at Messum’s, Cork Street, London W1.

2008 Solo exhibition at Messum’s, Cork Street, London W1.

2011 Solo exhibition at Messum's, Cork Street, London W1.

== Death and legacy ==
Roboz died at the age of 82 on 9 July 2012.

Her legacy lives on via the academic and art world through museums such as the Tate Britain, The National Portrait Gallery in London, Messum’s Fine Art, The Theatre Museum, and the Royal Festival Hall. Her legacy also continues in education through the Zsuzsi Roboz scholarship at Morley College in London. The scholarship is a registered charity that is dedicated to preserving and restoring Roboz’s work and organizing public viewings across England and Wales.
