= Panayiotis Kalorkoti =

British artist

- Born: 11 April 1957 (age 69); Ayios Amvrossios, Cyprus
- Education: Newcastle upon Tyne University (1976–80); Royal College of Art, London (1982–85)
- Known for: Painting, printmaking
- Website: www.kalorkoti.com

Panayiotis Kalorkoti (born 11 April 1957, Cyprus) is a British artist. He works primarily in acrylics and watercolour, and has also produced drawings, etchings, screenprints, lithographs and monotypes. His work is figurative and features bright colour, economic use of line and makes use of collage, whilst referring to conceptualism, abstraction and modernism.

== Early life ==
Kalorkoti was born in Cyprus in 1957. He was raised in a poor family and moved to the United Kingdom in 1966. He became a British citizen in 1974. He studied at Newcastle upon Tyne University (1976–80) and the Royal College of Art, London (1982–85).

== Career ==
Kalorkoti's work has been shown at the Imperial War Museum, London, National Portrait Gallery, London, and National Garden Festival, Gateshead. He has worked on major public projects, such as a residency at Grizedale Forest, Cumbria and has been artist in residence for the Leeds Playhouse and has won fellowships, scholarships and commissions. He was appointed the official war artist for the Falklands War.

Kalorkoti has been a part-time visiting lecturer at a number of art schools and won a Netherlands Government Scholarship (1986–87). He was appointed a Bartlett Fellow in the Visual Arts at Newcastle University in 1988 and was artist in residence at Cleveland County in 1992.
