= Richard Fitzwilliams =

British public relations consultant and commentator

- Born: Richard Brathwaite Lloyd Fitzwilliams; 14 October 1949 (age 77)
- Occupations: Public relations consultant, commentator, film critic
- Years active: 1972–present
- Known for: Editing The International Who's Who, royal commentary, film reviews
- Notable work: The International Who's Who
- Website: www.richardfitzwilliams.com

Richard Fitzwilliams (born 14 October 1949) is a British public relations consultant and commentator. He is known for his work promoting figurative art exhibitions, including those held at the Royal Society of Portrait Painters and the Threadneedle Prize at the Mall Galleries. From 1975 to 2001, he served as the editor of The International Who's Who.

== Professional career ==
=== Publishing ===
From 1972 to 1975, Fitzwilliams was the assistant editor of Africa South of the Sahara (Europa Publications). He then became the editor of Europa's International Who's Who, founded in 1935. His editing focused on cinema, theatre, art, history, especially royal matters, and politics.

Fitzwilliams also writes and lectures about Who's Who publications. He has discussed the reference book in radio interviews, including on BBC Radio 4's Today programme in 2009.

=== Public relations ===
Since 2002, Fitzwilliams has worked as a press consultant for the Royal Society of Portrait Painters, managing publicity for their annual exhibitions at the Mall Galleries, their self-portraits exhibition in 2007, and the permanent collection at Girton College, Cambridge.

Since 2008, he has also been a press consultant for the Threadneedle Prize, an exhibition of figurative painting and sculpture at the Mall Galleries. Since 2009, he has contributed to the Lynn Painter-Stainers Prize.

=== Royal commentator ===
In March 2021, a fictional news company that YouTuber pranksters Josh Pieters and Archie Manners created tricked him into giving his reaction to the Prince Harry and Meghan Markle interview with Oprah Winfrey two days before it aired.

He comments on matters related to the British royal family for various news outlets, including CNN, BBC News Channel, and Sky News. He has also lectured on the British honours system.

=== Newspapers and magazines ===
Fitzwilliams has contributed to The London and UK Datebook since 1997. writing the Artscene column. He reviews art events in London, Royal Ascot, and charity events for the "Going Places" section.
