= The Elizabeth Greenshields Foundation =

Canadian charity

The Elizabeth Greenshields Foundation (formerly The Elizabeth T. Greenshields Memorial Foundation) is a private Canadian charity that provides grants to young artists working in representational painting, sculpture, drawing and/or printmaking. Recipients must be studying or in the early stage of their career.

== History ==
It was established in 1955 by the Montreal lawyer Charles Glass Greenshields, Q.C. (1883–1974), in memory of his mother, Elizabeth T. Glass, to help young artists train in traditional artistic methods. It was endowed by Mr. Greenshields and does not solicit or receive external funding. By the terms of its endowment, it is precluded from funding the pursuit of abstract or non-objective art.

It received the Excellence in Fine Art Education Award from the Portrait Society of America in 2016 and the Gari Melchers Memorial Medal from the Artists' Fellowship in 2021.

In 2025, The Elizabeth Greenshields Foundation awarded close to C$1.6M in grants to 93 artists and art students. Since its inception, it has granted some C$33M to over 2000 students and artists in more than 80 countries.

== Notable grantees ==
- Jack Chambers (1955)
- John Fox (1955/1956)
- Stanley Lewis (1956/1957/1958)
- Timothy Whidborne (1956/1957)
- Guy Bardone (1957)
- Gaston Sébire (1957)
- Nelson Shanks (1960/1961)
- John Sherrill Houser (1962)
- Daniel Greene (1963)
- Jonathan Kenworthy (1969)
- Richard Whitney (1969/1970/1972)
- Robert Neffson (1974)
- Evan Penny (1975)
- Sharon Sprung (1976)
- Crawfurd Adamson (1976)
- D. Jeffrey Mims (1976)
- Hunt Slonem (1976)
- Mary Beth McKenzie (1977)
- Richard Sorrell (1977)
- Cherryl Fountain (1977)
- Rudolf Stussi (1978/1986)
- Paul Béliveau (1979)
- Chris Cran (1979)
- Martin Yeoman (1979)
- Steven Assael (1979/1990)
- Peter Kuhfeld (1980)
- Lorraine Simms (1981)
- Ken Currie (1982)
- Kate Downie (1983/1986)
- Louise Belcourt (1984/1985)
- Gwyneth Leech (1985)
- Melissa Scott-Miller (1985)
- Peter Edwards (1986/1992)
- Wendy Coburn (1987)
- G. Scott MacLeod (1988)
- Allison Watt (1989)
- Anne Desmet (1989/1996/2007)
- Nicolas Granger-Taylor (1990/1999)
- Clive Head (1990)
- Christian Furr (1991)
- Krzysztof Tomalski (1991)
- Chantal Joffe (1993)
- Justin Mortimer (1993)
- Jenny Saville (1993/1996)
- Conor Walton (1994)
- Beata Bigaj (1994)
- James Lloyd (1994/1996/1999)
- Nahem Shoa (1994/2000)
- Ann Gale (1997)
- Patricia Watwood (1997)
- Sophie Jodoin (1999)
- Michael Grimaldi (1999/2002)
- Teresa Dunn (2000/2007/2012)
- Stuart Pearson Wright (2000)
- Nathlie Provosty (2001/2003)
- Natalie Frank (2001/2005)
- Benjamin Sullivan (2003)
- Alyssa Monks (2003/2004/2006)
- Ellen Eagle (2003/2006/2011)
- Claire Sherman (2004)
- Jo Fraser (2010/2012/2014)
- Doron Langberg (2011)
- Aleah Chapin (2012/2014/2018)
- Alonsa Guevara (2013)
- Flora Yukhnovich (2013/2016)
- Anna Weyant (2013/2019)
- Mandy Payne (2015)
- Danica Lundy (2015/2017/2019)
- Gabrielle L'Hirondelle Hill (2016/2019)
- Angela Fraleigh (2017)
- David Kassan (2017)
- Meleko Mokgosi (2017)
- Arcmanoro Niles (2017/2019)
- Joani Tremblay (2018/2020)
- Narbi Price (2019)
- Julia Medyńska (2020/2021/2023)
- Louise Giovanelli (2021)
