= Norman Maurice Kadish =

British artist

- Born: October 31, 1916; London, United Kingdom
- Died: 28 October 1988 (aged 71); Edgware, Middlesex
- Known for: Artist
- Notable work: The Lambeth Walk

Norman Maurice Kadish (born 1916) was a British Artist and teacher, known for figurative art, especially portraits. His output was extremely diverse in terms of both subject matter and media, with his best-known paintings titled The Lambeth Walk and Britain by the Sea. He also painted a series of Biblical paintings based on stories in the Old Testament.

Although his career coincided with the flourishing of Modern Art, his oeuvre did not fit neatly into any of its dominant streams. He was a fine draughtsman, academically trained, who specialised in portraiture and figurative work at a time when Abstraction dominated the art world. His traditional style, subject matter and high colour put Norman Kadish outside the British artistic mainstream during his lifetime.

== Biography ==
Kadish was born in Hackney, London, of Lithuanian Jewish background.

In 1951 Kadish married Renée Shapiro (1928–2019) and moved from Hendon (where his family had bought a house during the war) to Edgware, Middlesex. During the 1950s, the couple had three daughters: Helen, Diane and Sharman Kadish.

== Principal works ==
Kadish regarded himself primarily as a portrait painter. Some of his best pictures were intimate portraits of his own family, such as the one of his five-year-old oldest daughter, Helen, that was praised as "enchanting" by the Guardian newspaper on 8 April 1960. He also undertook private commissions. Amongst his most important figurative group works were two large, peopled canvases: The Lambeth Walk (1939–1949) and Britain by the Sea (1961). These set-piece compositions expressed a quintessential Englishness. There was also a strongly nostalgic thread running through Kadish's work, especially for the fictional public school of Greyfriars and its hero Billy Bunter, created by the prolific children's author Frank Richards. He was commissioned to paint a number of portraits of Frank Richards[ and illustrations of Greyfriars School and its characters A detail of his painting of "Billy Bunter and the Famous Five" (1975) was published as the front cover of the "Howard Baker Summer Omnibus 1977".

In later years, the artist's subject matter continued to draw upon contemporary life, the environment where he lived or holidayed, such as shopping, railway stations, and beach scenes in Eastbourne or Jersey, often including boats. He preferred to paint from life: people, nudes, and sometimes still life. Although principally an oil painter, Kadish also drew in pencil, pen and ink, crayon, pastels, chalk, and charcoal, but he used watercolour only rarely. He also enjoyed crafts, especially bookbinding. He nearly always signed and dated his work. He invented a monogram: the "cake dish", a play on the anglicised pronunciation of his Hebrew-derived surname.

In the 1960s, Kadish began a Biblical Cycle of five paintings, based on stories in the Hebrew Bible:

- Jacob and the Angel (1964)
- Belshazzar's Feast (1965)
- Samson (1967)
- The Fall of Jericho (1969)
- Samson with the Jawbone of an Ass (1971)

Drawing exclusively on the Old Testament for his subject matter reflected his Jewish background. This is especially obvious in Jacob and the Angel (1964) where the angel is depicted as an incorporeal golden mist, much more in keeping with the non-representational Jewish religious tradition than the winged men of Renaissance Art.

== Exhibitions ==
Kadish exhibited regularly and sold work steadily throughout his artistic career. He was a member of several art societies affiliated to the Federation of British Artists: the Royal Society of Marine Artists, United Artists, and the Hesketh Hubbard, whose Edward Halliday Prize he won in 1969 for “best portrait” of his middle daughter Diane at 10.
