= Nicolas Taylor =

Nicolas Taylor may refer to:

- Nick Taylor (footballer), American football (soccer) player
- Nicolas Taylor (racing driver), Canadian racing driver

== See also ==
- Nicholas Taylor (disambiguation)
- Nicolas Granger-Taylor, artist
