= Richard FitzWilliam =

Richard FitzWilliam may refer to:

- Richard FitzWilliam, 7th Viscount FitzWilliam (1745–1816), Irish Viscount, benefactor and musical antiquarian
- Richard FitzWilliam, 6th Viscount FitzWilliam (1711–1776), Irish peer and property developer
- Richard FitzWilliam, 5th Viscount FitzWilliam (c. 1677–1743), Irish nobleman and MP

== See also ==
- Richard Fitzwilliams, PR consultant
