= Ana Schmidt =

German architect and a painter

Ana Schmidt is a German architect and a painter, winner of the Threadneedle Prize in 2018. She focuses her work on urban landscapes.

== Biography and career ==
Born in Bochum, Germany, Schmidt moved with her family to Asia and lived in Vietnam and Thailand.

Years later, she moved to Spain to study at the Polytechnic University of Barcelona, where she received a Master of Science in Architecture. Schmidt also received an ARC Living Master from the Art Renewal Center.

In 2018 she won the Columbia Threadneedle Prize, a major art prize for contemporary figurative art.

She currently lives and works as an artist and urban planning architect in Bilbao, Spain.

== Work ==
=== Selected solo exhibitions ===
- Mall Galleries, London, 2019
- Cervantes Gallery, Oviedo, Spain, 2015
- L'Occhio Gallery of Art, Venice, Italy, 2013
- Torrene Aretoa Exhibition Space in Getxo, Spain, 2012
- Basque Architectural Association in Bilbao, Spain, 2010

=== Selected catalogs ===
- The Columbia Threadneedle Prize, Figurative Art Today. Mall Galleries, Federation of British Artists - January 2018. Pages: 2–4, 10
- 13th International Art Renewal Center Salon, International Realism. Art Renewal Center - 2018. Pages: 183–189 and back cover - ISBN 9781851499175
- Leonardo, Guía de arte y artistas. Galería Arte Libre - 2016. Page: 33 - ISBN 9788460884040
- International Art Exhibition, NordArt, 06/06 - 04/10 2015. Kunstwerk Carlshütte - 2015. Pages: 148 - ISBN 9783981375183
- International 2014/2015 Art Renewal Center Salon. Art Renewal Center - 2015. Pages: 14–18, 153, 159
- Acrylicworks 2, Radical Breakthroughs. North Light Books - 2015. Pages: 32–33 - ISBN 97814403 34702
- NordArt 2012, 02.06 -30.09.2012. Kunstwerk Carlshütte - 2012. Pages: 121 - ISBN 9783981375145

=== Media ===
- Easel Words / Ana Schmidt, Nov/Dec. 2019 - Editor: The Jackdaw Magazine, London, UK
- Beauty amidst the ruins, Anise Stevens, Winter, 2016 - Editor: Acrylic Artist Magazine, US. Pages: 42–51

== Awards ==
- ARC Salon Award (landscape category), 2020
- Columbia Threadneedle Prize for her painting, Dead End, 2018
- ARC Salon Award (landscape category), 2018
- ARC Salon Award (landscape category), 2015
- AixeGetxo Award 2013
- Ora Prize Award 2012 - 2013
