= Cylinder (gallery) =

South Korean gallery

Cylinder (stylized as "C Y L I N D E R") is a gallery in the Gwanak District of Seoul, South Korea. Founded in November 2020, it is known for its "forward-looking" curation, as well as performance programs and installation exhibitions. Frieze called it "one of Seoul’s most noteworthy emerging galleries," and The Korea Times called it "one of the most distinctive and rapidly rising tastemakers in Seoul’s gallery scene."

== History ==
Ro founded Cylinder in 2020. Beforehand, he was an artist. The space was a "former chicken shop" that he initially wanted to use as a studio but then pivoted to opening a gallery after his friend, Wonwoo Lee, wished to host an exhibition there.

Although Ro didn't have much "confidence about running a gallery at first," he felt that its relatively secluded location compared to other art centers in Seoul meant that he could curate however he'd like: "C1 is a good platform for challenging projects–such as transforming the gallery into a techno club or supporting young artists."

In 2023, Ro opened Cylinder Two in the Yongsan District; unlike Cylinder One, its more popular location is intended "for more established artists or a big project." In the same year, Cylinder was awarded one of two Focus Asia Stand Prizes by Frieze, specifically for presenting Sinae Yoo's installation work.

In 2024, Cylinder debuted at Liste. In 2026, it debuted at Art Basel Hong Kong.
