= Lynn Painter-Stainers Prize =

Annual art award

The Lynn Painter-Stainers Prize is an annual art award, intended to encourage creative representational painting and draughtsmanship. It gives out prizes totalling £25,000. The prize originated in London in 2005, with a collaboration between the Worshipful Company of Painter-Stainers and the Lynn Foundation. The final exhibition has been held at the Mall Galleries, London, since 2012.

== Winners ==
The Independent reviewed the 2009 exhibition favourably, saying "The means are relatively traditional – oil on board, oil on canvas, acrylic on canvas, etc. The range is, at first glance, familiar: landscape, ruminative portraiture, still life... What we look for in any show such as this one is the way in which the painter has engaged with his or her subject, the particular angle of attack... This does not necessarily mean being wildly experimental so that the world as we know it disappears altogether. There is none of that here. And yet abstraction does play a part, and often quite a subtle one."

Selector Steve Pill, shared his thoughts on the selection of the exhibition: "I was keen to try and view each work from the perspective of a wider audience. The two stated aims of the Lynn Painter-Stainers Prize are to encourage creative representational painting and promote the skill of draughtsmanship, so I often asked myself: would we be fulfilling that promise by including this work? Would a visitor expecting these qualities be truly satisfied by every painting we chose? I hope you’ll agree that we have stayed true to those principles and selected a collection of work that really celebrates the vitality, diversity and skill of contemporary representational painting in the UK today."

The 2012 prize was won by Anthony Williams for a still life painting of an electric fan. 98 paintings were selected for the final exhibition.

In 2013 the prize winner was artist Ruth Stage, for her tempera painting The Isabella Plantation. Stage received £15,000 and a gold medal. There were five judges; artist Nina Murdoch, former winner Antony Williams, art critic Andrew Lambirth and Tate fellow Andrew Wilton who picked the winners from 72 finalists. A young artist prize was also awarded (worth £2,500) and there were five runners-up spots.

The 2014 prize was won by Edinburgh-based artist Catharine Davison for her 'mesmerising' en plain air painting Craggs at Dawn (Calton Hill). During a private award ceremony, 17 March 2014, Davidson was presented with the £15,000 prize in addition to an engraved gold medal. The Young Artist Award of £2,500 was awarded to University of Brighton student, Charlie Schaffer, for his work, Antonio. Five runner-up prizes of £1,500 each were awarded to; Peter Archer for Causeway; Wylie Craig for MD (Pierced); Anabel Cullen for Untitled (Adrian Gillian); Benjamin Hope for Self portrait in leftover paint; and David Tebbs for Catwalk No.1. The 2014 exhibition comprised 85 works by 78 artists selected by a prestigious panel of judges; Peter Clossick, Artist; Ken Howard OBE RA NEAC, Artist; Paul Newland, Artist; Steve Pill, Editor Artists and Illustrators magazine; and Andrew Wilton, visiting research fellow at Tate Britain. 2014.

=== First Prize winners ===
- 2005 Michael Bilton for Early Morning Mist
- 2006 John Lessor for Vincent, Timothy and Samuel
- 2007 Benjamin Sullivan for New Life
- 2008 Melissa Scott-Miller for Islington Kids
- 2009 Toby Wiggins for Suspended Animation
- 2010 Rachel Levitas for Urban Fox III
- 2011 No award?
- 2012 Anthony Williams for Still Life with Electric Fan
- 2013 Ruth Stage for The Isabella Plantation
- 2014 Catharine Davidson for The Craggs at Dawn (from Calton Hill)

== See also ==
- List of European art awards
