= Ellen Eagle =

American painter

- Education: Art Students League of New York; California College of Arts and Crafts
- Known for: pastel figure drawing

Ellen Eagle is an American artist, best known for her figure drawings and portraits in pastel. At an intimate scale, Eagle's subjects are friends, fellow artists, and professional models drawn from life in natural light. Her work is characterized by restraint of color, self-containment, and the depiction of her subjects' emotional states. She is known for her reflective self-portraits, which can at times appear whimsical, are a study in the trials and tribulations of the life of an artist.

== Education ==
Eagle's first formal training in art was at ten years old at the Art Students League of New York. She credits this experience in helping her to discover what type of artist she wanted to become. She became fascinated with painting the faces of friends in their natural setting. Eagle holds a BFA in drawing from the California College of Arts and Crafts, and studied with Daniel Greene and Harvey Dinnerstein.

== Exhibitions ==
Eagle has exhibited at the New Jersey State Museum in Trenton, New Jersey, Frye Art Museum in Seattle, Washington, the Albright-Knox Art Gallery, National Academy of Design Museum in New York, Butler Institute of American Art in Youngstown, Ohio, and has had solo exhibitions at the Lyme Academy College of Fine Arts, Concordia College in Bronxville, New York, and the Tomasulo Gallery at Union County College in Cranford, New Jersey. She is represented by Forum Gallery.

== Recognition ==
Her work was the cover feature in the Pastel Journal of June, 2006, and has been included in American Artist Magazine and several publications on drawing. Eagle has received fellowships at the Vermont Studio Center, and twice earned grants from the Elizabeth Greenshields Foundation. Eagle teaches at the Art Students League of New York and at the National Academy School of Fine Arts, New York.

== Style ==
Eagle values honesty in art above all else. She has an aversion to flamboyancy in her models and prefers modesty in appearance as well as demeanor. Eagle describes her pastel portraits as undeniable extensions of herself, and representative of her temperament. Eagle is quoted saying "I'm looking for the simplest possible expression. Simplicity feels right for me."

Eagle describes her painting preference as delving more deeply than surface appearance to offer a glimpse of an inner life. In two of her paintings, Self-portrait, and Blue, she pictures a moment in which she steps back from the easel, removes her glasses, and looks again literally and figuratively. She wants to make sure what she sees is how it actually appears. Eagle wants her paintings to say "here I am, as I really am."

One of Eagle's more famous paintings was of Miss Leonard. Eagle admired her elegance and demeanor. Eagle was painting a friend, Lisa but was forced to stop as Lisa became deathly ill. Her passion and emotions stemming from thinking about her ill friend guided her in her painting of Miss Leonard.
