= Benjamin Sullivan =

Benjamin or Ben Sullivan may refer to:

- Ben Sullivan (Scrubs), a character in the TV series Scrubs
- Benjamin Sullivan (artist) (born 1977), British visual artist
- Ben Sullivan (basketball) (born 1984), American basketball coach and former player
