= Ruth Stage =

British artist

Ruth Stage is a British artist who uses the ancient egg tempera painting technique in her work, and is known for her landscapes. Born in Hartlepool, Stage studied at the Royal Academy Schools, graduating in 1995. In 1999 she was elected to the New English Art Club.

On 18 February 2013 she won the £15,000 Lynn Painter-Stainers art prize for her work The Isabella Plantation, with a presentation at the Mall Galleries, London.

Her painting Champagne Pools, Queensland is in the Imperial College Healthcare Charity Art Collection, while her tempera painting London to Leeds is owned by Durham University. she attended blakeston comprehensive in Stockton on Tees, and grew up in the same road as former Manchester United and England defender Gary pallister.
