= Julia Medyńska =

Polish-American painter

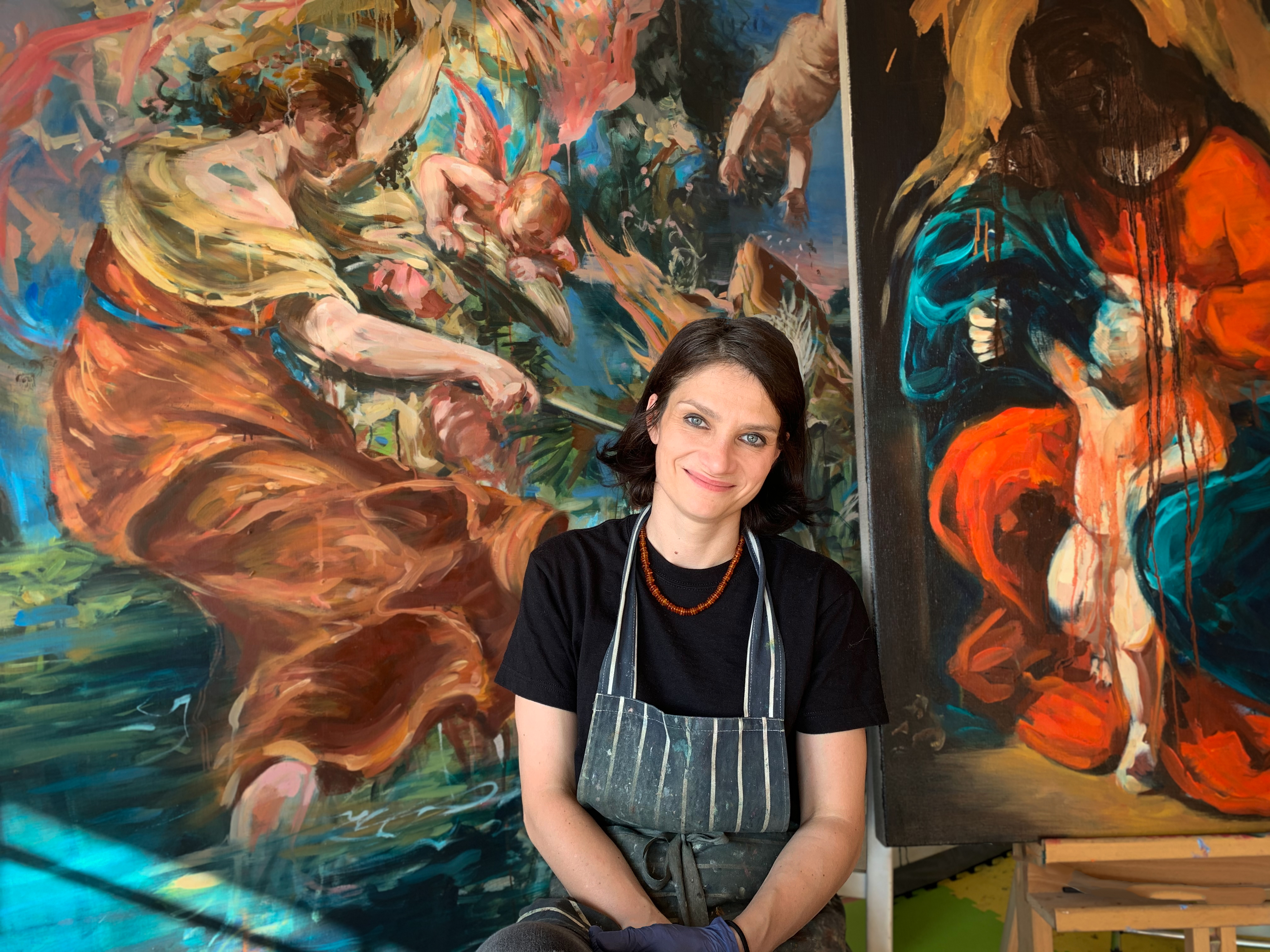
- Born: 1981 (age 44–45); Gdańsk, Poland
- Education: Columbia University
- Known for: Painting
- Style: Figurative Art
- Website: juliamedynska.com

Julia Medyńska (born 1981 in Gdańsk, Poland) is a Polish-American figurative painter, recognized for her paintings exploring Dystopian Romanticism.

== Early life and education ==
Medyńska was born in Gdańsk, Poland, in 1981. In 1985, her family escaped Poland and moved to West Berlin. After finishing high school, she moved to New York City, where she received her BA from Columbia University in 2013. Subsequently, in 2017, she earned her MFA in Visual Arts from the Columbia University School of the Arts.

== Awards ==
Medyńska was three times awarded The Elizabeth Greenshields Foundation Grant (2020, 2021, and 2023).

== Publications ==
- Elle Decoration, style and design magazine
- Well.pl, lifestyle portal featuring Art & Culture
- Weranda, home design and interior decorating magazine
- Wysokie Obcasy, weekly lifestyle magazine of Gazeta Wyborcza
- Hygge, online art magazine
- New American Paintings, MFA printed Edition
- Contemporary LYNX, international and independent publication for art, design, collecting and photography on visual culture
- Rynek i Sztuka, online art magazine
- Jackson's Art, artist interviews, Jackson's Painting Prize 2020

== Exhibitions ==
=== Notable solo exhibitions ===
- Double Entendre at NADA Villa Warsaw, Office Space Gallery, Warsaw, Poland, 2025
- SALIGIA, Galeria Art, Warsaw, Poland, 2024
- Stills at NADA Villa Warsaw, Yulia Topchiy NYC, Warsaw, Poland, 2024
- Nächtliche Streifzüge, Jedlitschka Gallery, Zurich, Switzerland, 2023
- What We Left Behind, Galria ATC, Tenerife, Spain, 2022
- AGAIN., Krakauer Haus, Nürnberg, Germany (duo show with Małgorzata Markiewicz), 2022
- lost & found, Modulgallerie, Nürnberg, Germany (duo show with Małgorzata Markiewicz), 2022
- Queen's Paradise, Pilipczuk Gallery, Copenhagen, Denmark, 2022
- Aurora, Muzeum Lubuskie, Gorzów, Poland, 2022
- Dancing by the Lake, Galeria Art, Warsaw, Poland, 2021
- Skin as White as Snow, School Gallery, London, UK, 2021
- Maskarada, Muzeum Ziemi Międzyrzeckiej, Międzyrzecz, Poland, 2021

=== Notable group exhibitions ===
- ZOOOM, Galeria Miejska Arsenał, Poznań, Poland, 2025
- My i psy, psy i my, Państwowa Galeria Sztuki, Sopot, Poland (curator Bogusław Deptuła), 2021
