= Melissa Scott (disambiguation) =

Melissa Scott is a science fiction and fantasy author.

Melissa Scott may also refer to:

- Melissa Scott (pastor), widow and successor of pastor Gene Scott
- Melissa Scott, character in Exiles (Malibu Comics)

== See also ==
- Melissa Scott-Hayward, cricketer
- Melissa Scott-Miller, artist
