= Sharman Kadish =

British historian

Sharman Kadish (born 1959) is a contemporary scholar, author, historian and preservationist.

== Biography ==
Kadish was born in London, England, of Russian-Jewish descent. Her father was the artist Norman Maurice Kadish. She was educated at University College London, and St Antony's College, Oxford, where she received her doctorate in modern history. From 1986 to 1987 she was a Scheinbrun Visiting Post-doctoral Research Fellow at the Hebrew University of Jerusalem. Her first book, based on her DPhil, Bolsheviks and British Jews was winner of a Choice Outstanding Academic Book award in 1993. From 1992 to 1993 she was Camperdown House Research Fellow at Royal Holloway College, University of London, during which time she researched and wrote A Good Jew and a Good Englishman, a centenary, but critical, history of the youth movement the Jewish Lads' and Girls' Brigade. Between 1994 and 1997 she returned to the Hebrew University where she worked at the Center for Jewish Art, helping to develop the Architecture Section of the Index of Jewish Art, whilst pursuing her interest in Anglo-Jewish architecture and its preservation.

In 1991, following a conference in London that she organised, Kadish founded the Working Party on Jewish Monuments in the UK & Ireland, a pressure group campaigning for the protection of historic synagogues, cemeteries and other sites of Jewish interest in the country. This was the precursor to Jewish Heritage UK, a preservation charity, that she founded and directed between 2004 and 2016.

In 1997, she returned to Britain to embark on a national survey of the Jewish built heritage in the UK and Ireland, a project made possible principally by the Heritage Lottery Fund. Her pioneering guidebook Jewish Heritage in England was first published by English Heritage in 2006 and a second edition, expanded, revised and updated, was published under the new title of Jewish Heritage in Britain and Ireland in 2015. A companion architectural guidebook, Jewish Heritage in Gibraltar, appeared in 2007. Her monograph,The Synagogues of Britain and Ireland: An Architectural and Social History (Yale University Press 2011), was shortlisted for the American Society of Historians of British Art Prize in 2013.

As well as teaching undergraduate and postgraduate courses on Modern Jewish History and Jewish Art and Architecture at the Universities of London and Manchester, Kadish has worked in the heritage sector since 1987, both in the voluntary sector and in private practice.

== Selected publications ==
- Bolsheviks and British Jews. London & Portland, OR: Frank Cass, 1992. ISBN 0-7146-3371-2
- A Good Jew & a Good Englishman: The Jewish Lads' & Girls' Brigade, 1895–1995. London: Vallentine Mitchell, 1995
- Building Jerusalem: Jewish Architecture in Britain. London: Vallentine Mitchell, 1996
- Synagogues in Places of Worship Series [for children]. Oxford: Heinemann Library, 1998
- Bevis Marks Synagogue 1701–2001. Swindon: English Heritage, 2001
- Jewish Heritage in England; An Architectural Guide. Swindon: English Heritage, 2006
- Jewish Heritage in Gibraltar, An Architectural Guide. Reading: Spire Books, 2007
- The Synagogues of Britain and Ireland: An Architectural and Social History. New Haven and London: Yale University Press, 2011
- Jewish Heritage in Britain and Ireland: An Architectural Guide. Swindon: Historic England, 2015

Kadish has also written numerous articles published in academic and popular journals and the press.
