= Crawfurd Adamson =

Scottish artist

Crawfurd Adamson (1953 – 11 November 2024) was a noted figurative artist from Edinburgh, although he spent much of his career in the south of England. He has exhibited widely and has paintings in major collections around the world, including the Metropolitan Museum of Art in New York, and the National Fleming Collection in London. He came to note in the 1980s and 90s, with extensive international shows including Monaco, Hong Kong and Spain. His work fell out of fashion during the late 90s, as the art market took a preference to conceptual works, rather than traditional media such as oil painting or pastels.

== Career ==
Adamson graduated from the Duncan of Jordanstone College of Art and Design in Dundee in 1976. During the course of his degree, he won the Scottish Education Department's Travelling Scholarship. He won another scholarship immediately after his graduation. In 1977, he was granted a scholarship to work in France by the Elizabeth Greenshields Foundation, of Canada. Having exhibited with street art specialists, the Signal Gallery, as well as having an audience within the nightclub scene in London, he has transcended his original Scottish colourist roots in terms or market, and found favour with a younger audience. He won both the Schmincke Pastel prize from the Pastel Society in 2012, as well as first prize within the non-member category, and continues to exhibit internationally.

== Collections ==
Adamson's works are part of the collections of museums the world over. Some notable locations of his works include the Metropolitan Museum of Art, New York, The Fleming Collection, London, Standard Chartered Bank, CSO Valuation, Gartmore Investment Co. Ltd., Prudential Insurance and the Wiltshire Education Department. His works are in several private collections.
