= Portrait of Ms Ruby May, Standing =

2012 painting by Leena McCall

- Artist: Leena McCall
- Year: 2012
- Medium: Oil on canvas

Portrait of Ms Ruby May, Standing is an oil on canvas painting made in 2012 by the British visual artist Leena McCall, portraying her friend Ruby May.

== Description ==
The painting depicts May, a tattooed black-haired woman, smoking a pipe. May is coolly scrutinizing the viewer, her other hand on her hip, with her trousers unbuttoned such that her pubic hair is visible. McCall's intention in painting May was to explore "how women choose to express their sexual identity beyond the male gaze".

== Reception ==
The painting received public attention after the Mall Galleries removed it from the Society of Women Artists's annual exhibition in 2014, after which it was replaced with another nude portrait. According to a statement by the Galleries, this was done because of "a number of complaints regarding the depiction of the subject and taking account of its location en route for children to our learning centre", and, according to McCall, because the painting had been deemed "disgusting" and "pornographic". Writing in The Guardian, Rowan Pelling interpreted this reaction as implying that "the minute a woman is alive and free to move, an active agent of her own sexuality, she is a menace to society", whereas Mall Galleries viewers appeared to feel more comfortable with a nude woman who is a "more passive and unthreatening recipient of the wandering viewer's gaze". In response to the removal of the work, McCall started a Twitter campaign with the hashtag #eroticcensorship.
