= Worshipful Company of Painter-Stainers =

Livery company of the City of London

Coordinates: 51.5116443°N 0.0950956°W

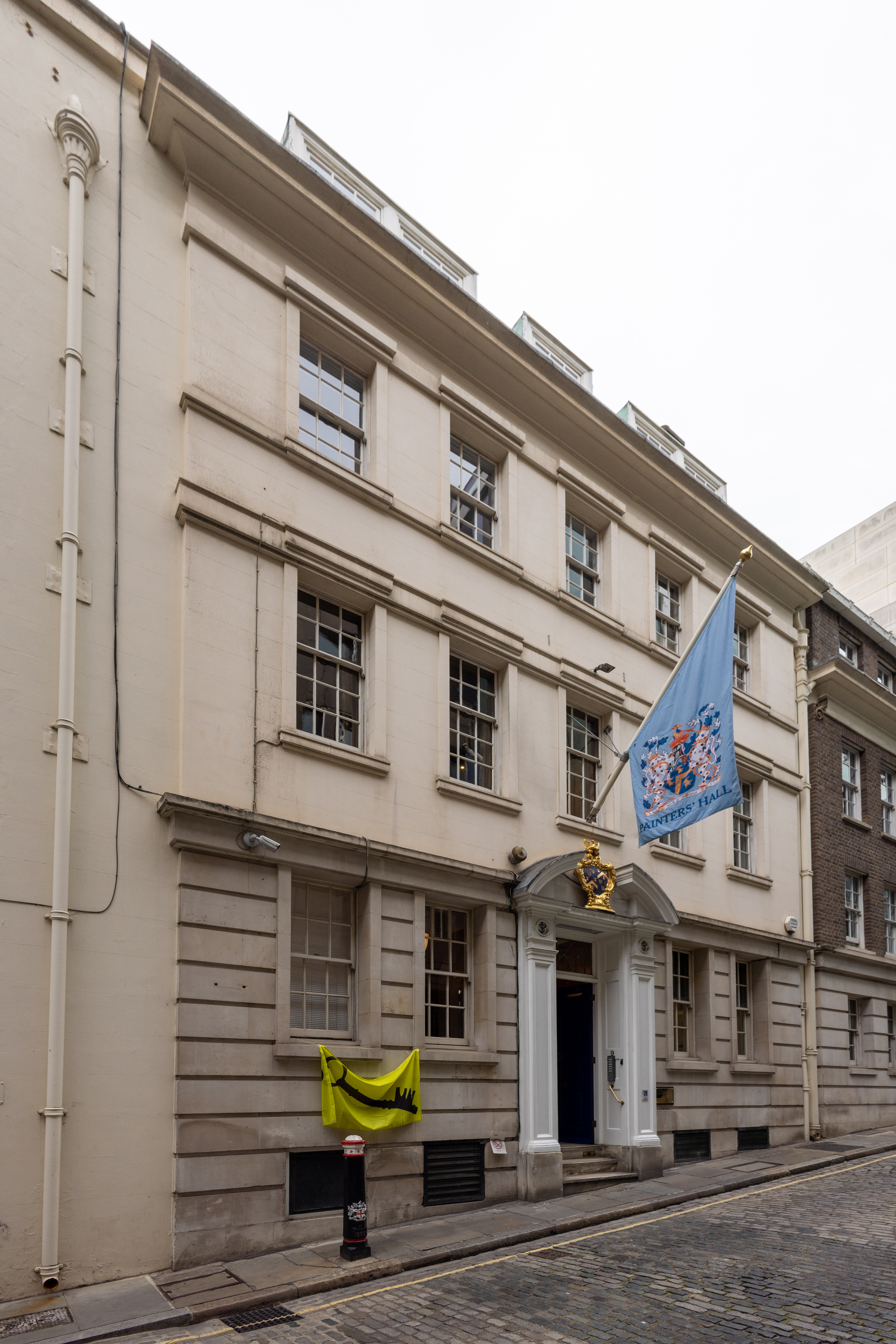
Painters' Hall

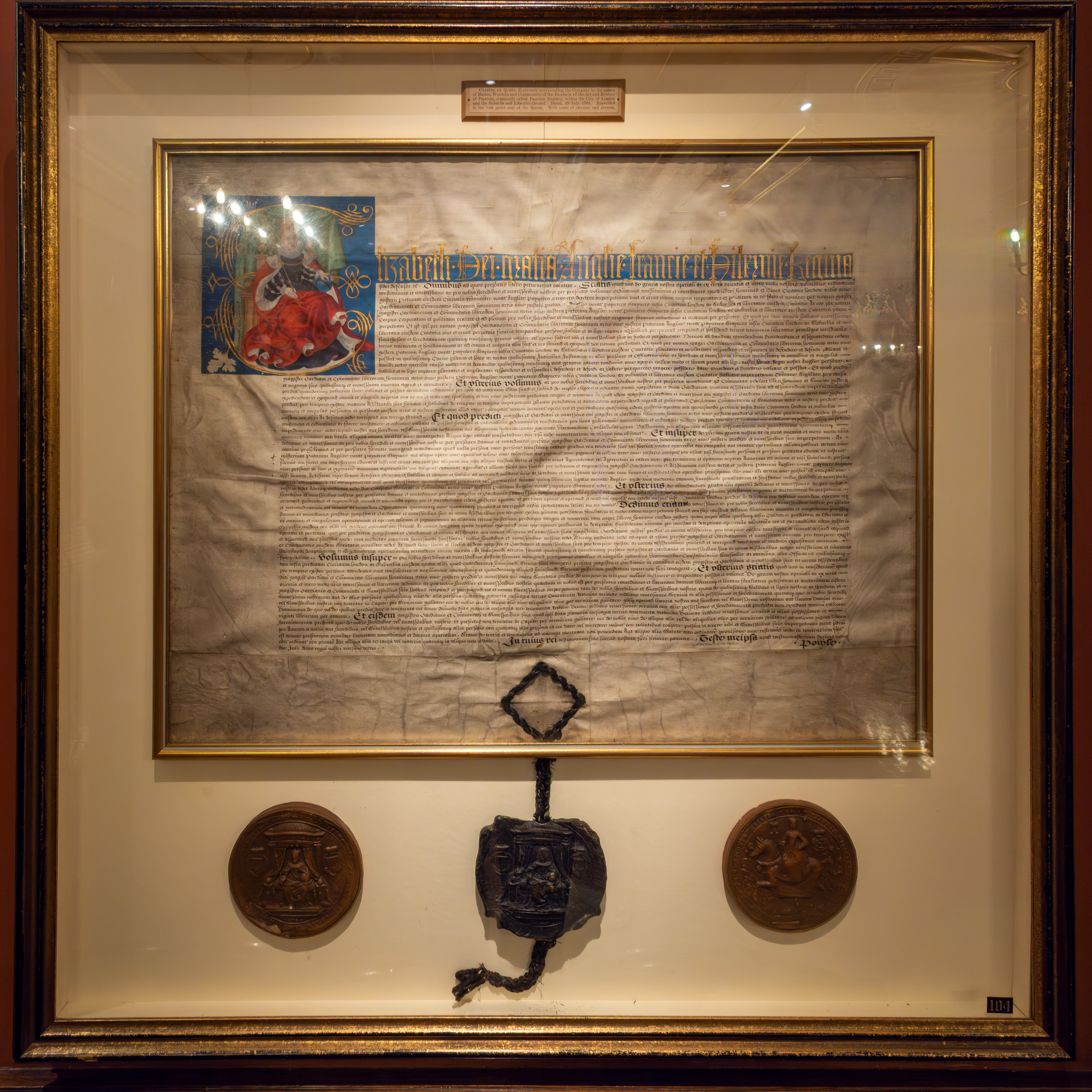
1581 charter of the company from Queen Elizabeth I

The Worshipful Company of Painter-Stainers is one of the livery companies of the City of London. An organisation of painters of metals and wood is known to have existed as early as 1283. A similar organisation of stainers, who generally worked on staining cloth for decorative wall hangings, existed as early as 1400. The two bodies merged in 1502; the new organisation was incorporated under a Royal Charter in 1581.

Today, the company is less an association of painters and more a charitable company, with the promotion of education in the fine and decorative arts and crafts as its main theme. The Painters' Company Scholarship Scheme was established in 2012 to support undergraduates every year at London Art Colleges. Each student receives £5,000 annually from the beginning of their second year until they complete their studies, and they are known as a Painters' Company Scholar. The students are selected entirely on merit, and this is the most meritocratically awarded scholarship for art students in London today.

The Painters Company also co-sponsors one of the largest UK open art competitions: the Lynn Painter-Stainers Prize was created in 2005 by the Worshipful Company of Painter-Stainers and the Lynn Foundation to encourage the very best creative representational painting and promote the skill of draftsmanship. It awards prize money of £30,000.

Twelve Liverymen have held the office of Lord mayor of London since 1922.

The Company ranks twenty-eighth in the order of precedence of livery companies. The company's motto is Amor Queat Obedientiam, Latin for Love Can Compel Obedience.

The livery company's hall is situated between Huggin Hill and Little Trinity Lane, in the ward of Queenhithe.

== Annual prizes ==
=== Lynn Painter-Stainers Prize ===
The Lynn Painter-Stainers Prize was created in 2005 by the Worshipful Company of Painter-Stainers and the Lynn Foundation for representational painting and draughtsmanship.

==== Winner and Second Prize Winner ====
The Winner receives £15,000. A Second Prize Winner is awarded £4,000.

==== People's Prize ====
An award of £2,000.

==== The Young Artist Award ====
An award of £4,000.

==== Brian Botting Prize for Figurative Drawing ====
This Prize was established in 2015 with a bequest following the death of Brian Botting. A prize of £5,000 is awarded annually to a young artist who is 30 years of age or under. Originally a stand-alone Worshipful Company of Painter-Stainers prize, brought under the umbrella of the Lynn Painter-Stainers Prize in 2017.

=== New English Art Club Prize ===
This Prize of £200 is awarded to an exhibitor at the Annual Exhibition of the New English Art Club.

In 2015 the winner was Michael Whittlesea.

=== Armed Forces Art Society Prize ===
This Prize of £100 is awarded at the Society's Annual Exhibition held at the Mall Galleries.

In 2015 the winner was Caroline De Peyrecave.

=== Photography Prize ===
This Prize of £1,000 is awarded to a final year student at the annual Royal College of Art Degree Show. Possibly no longer awarded.

In 2014 the winner was Helen McGhie.

=== Gordon Luton Award for Fine Art ===
This Prize of £2,000 is awarded to a Graduate or Postgraduate student in the fine art of painting to assist the winner to become commercially viable. The winner is selected from candidates exhibiting at the final year shows of the Royal College of Art, the Slade School of Fine Art and the Royal Academy Schools. There are also two Runners-up Prizes of £500. Possibly no longer awarded.

In 2014 the winner was Marlene Steyne from the Royal College of Art and the Runners-up Prizes were awarded to Alex Clarke from Royal Academy Schools, and Chao Lu of the Royal College of Art.

== Distinguished members ==
Through the centuries many distinguished artists have been members of the company, including:

- Robert Aggas
- Joshua Reynolds P.R.A.
- Godfrey Kneller
- Peter Lely
- James Thornhill
- William Dobson
- Peter Monamy
- Lord Leighton P.R.A.
- John Millais P.R.A.
- Juliet Pannett
- Edward Poynter P.R.A.
- Alfred Munnings P.R.A.
- Walter Thomas Monnington
- Frank Dicksee P.R.A.
- Gerald Kelly P.R.A.
- Charles Wheeler P.R.A.
- Roger de Grey P.R.A.
- Theo Ramos
- Ken Howard OBE RA
- Daphne Todd OBE PPRP

Other distinguished members have included:

- Edwin Lutyens P.R.A.
- 7th Duke of Wellington
- Field Marshal Lord Alexander
- Marshal of the Royal Air Force Lord Tedder
- Gerald Templer
- Colin Cole
- Charles Guthrie, Baron Guthrie of Craigiebank
- Roger Wheeler
- Hugh Casson R.A.
- Denis Rooke
- Denis Thatcher
- Carl Aarvold
- Philip Dowson P.R.A.

== Company Chaplains and Church ==
- Reverend Tim Handley
- St James Garlickhythe
- Guild of Saint Luke

== Coat of arms ==
Coat of arms of Worshipful Company of Painter-Stainers
Crest On a wreath Or and gules, a phoenix proper. Mantled azure, doubled ermine. Escutcheon Quarterly first and fourth azure, three escutcheons, two and one, argent; second and third, azure a chevron between three phoenix heads erased Or beaked gules. Supporters On either side a panther argent spotted with various colours, ducally crowned, collared and chained Or. Motto 'Amor queat obedientiam'
