= Robert Aggas =

English painter

Robert Aggas, sometimes known as Robert Augus or Angus, was an English landscape and scene painter, who was employed by Charles II. A landscape by him is preserved in the Painter-Stainers' Hall. He died in 1679, aged about 60.

Bainbrigge Buckridge in his Art of Painting described him as "a good English landskip Painter, both in oil and distemper. He was also skilful in architecture, in which kind he painted many scenes for the play-house in Covent-Garden", adding that he "became eminent, not so much by his labour and industry, as through the bend of his natural genius".
