= Robert Neffson =

American painter (born 1949)

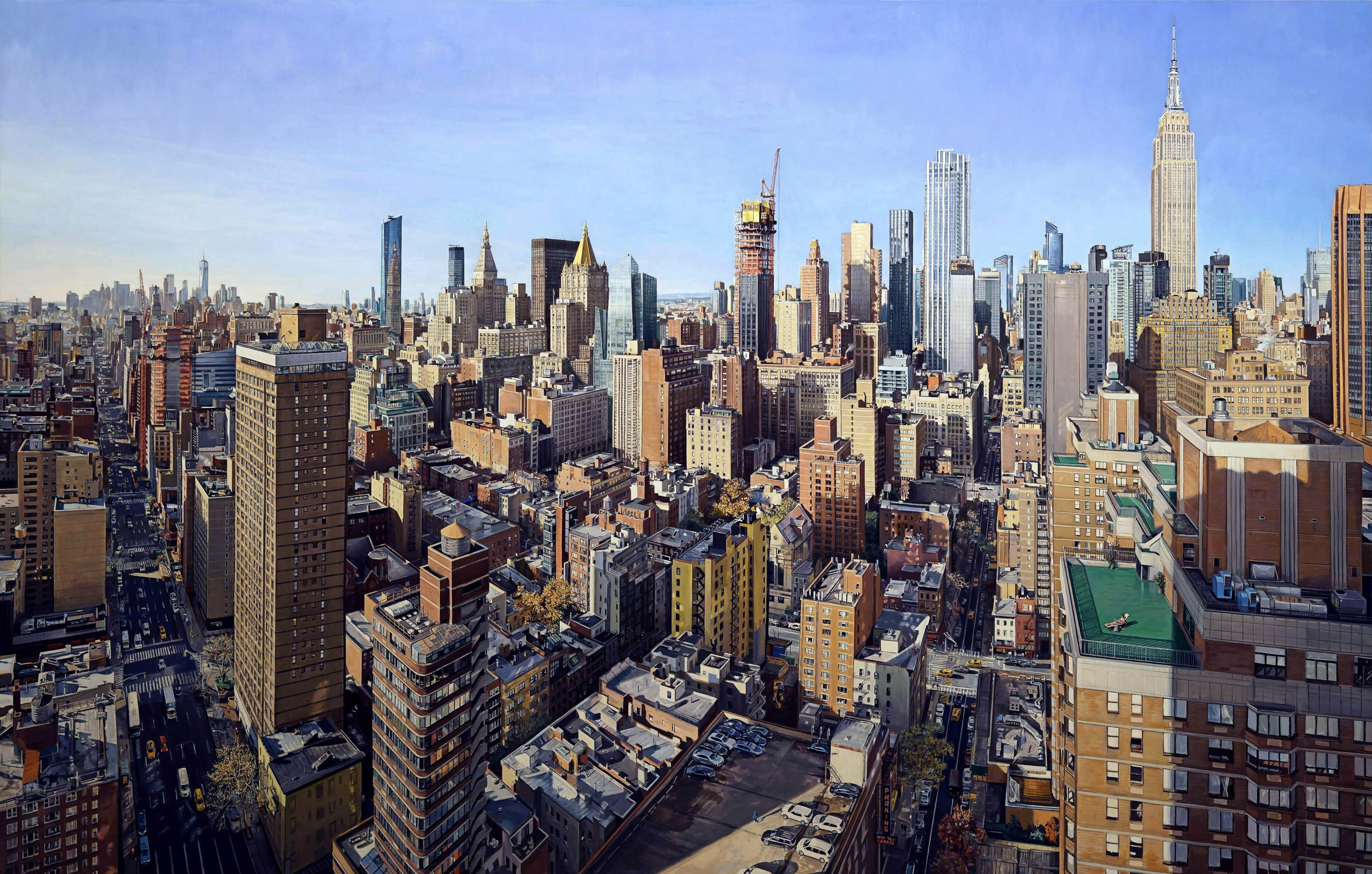
Robert Neffson "EMPIRE" 50X79" oil 2020

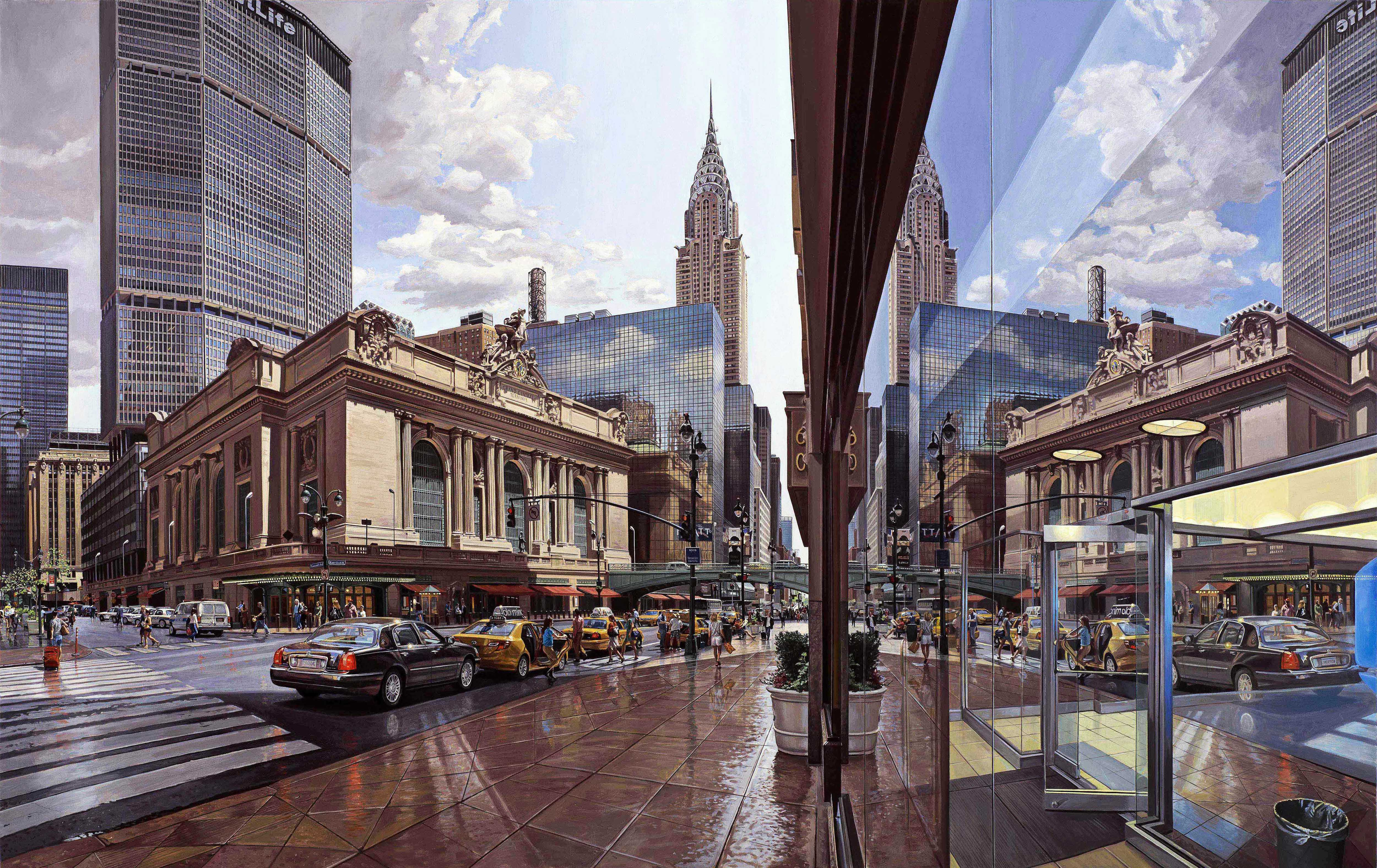
Robert Neffson "Grand Central Window" 62x98" oil 2012

Robert Neffson (born December 28, 1949) is an American painter known for his photorealistic street scenes of various cities around the world, museum interiors and for early still lifes and figure paintings.

== Early life and education ==
Neffson was born in New York City and grew up in Little Neck, New York. He was raised by a single father, after his mother, an artist, died when he was seven. He began attending classes at the Art Students League of New York in 1961, under the instruction of artists such as Lennart Anderson and Edwin Dickinson. As a student he copied old masters at the Metropolitan Museum of Art in New York and the Boston Museum of Fine Arts. His study of, among others, the painters Jan Vermeer, Thomas Eakins, Camille Corot, and Canaletto, developed his skills further. While attending the Boston University College of Fine Arts, from which he graduated cum laude in 1971, Neffson's work attracted the attention of his professors, including James Weeks and the abstract expressionist painter, Philip Guston.

He also studied at the Skowhegan School of Painting and Sculpture in Maine and the Tanglewood Institute in Lenox, Massachusetts, both on full scholarship. Achieving his master's degree in Fine Arts for Painting in 1973, again from Boston University, Neffson taught briefly at the DeCordova Museum in Lincoln, Massachusetts, and Fisher College in Boston. He received the Massachusetts Arts and Humanities Foundation and the Elizabeth T. Greenshields Memorial Foundation Grants in support of his work.

== Artistic career ==
In 1976, Neffson's life and work were significantly changed when he was awarded the Fulbright-Hayes Fellowship for Painting in Rome. During his stay in Italy, he met William Bailey at the American Academy in Rome, who had a strong influence on his still life paintings at the time. Upon his return in 1977, Neffson was given a year long Artist-in-Residence Grant by the Roswell Museum and Art Center in New Mexico, followed by teaching positions at Arizona State University in Tempe and Pennsylvania State University. At that time he received a Pennsylvania Council on the Arts Visual Artist Grant in 1983. He has also taught at Pratt Institute in Brooklyn, New York and has continued to teach Painting from Life for many years at the Art Students League of New York.

Neffson was a member of the First Street Gallery in New York from 1978 to 1985, during which time he had numerous solo exhibitions, as well as group shows with such fellow artists as Catherine Murphy. While represented from 1985 to 1998 by Gallery Henoch in New York City, he was inspired by Richard Estes and Chuck Close and was among a group of second-generation Photorealist painters that were exhibiting in SoHo galleries such as O. K. Harris Works of Art and Louis Meisel Gallery.

In 2004, Neffson was commissioned to create a painting of the near-completed new 7 World Trade Center building, which was presented to developer Larry Silverstein of Silverstein Properties in a ceremony presided over by New York State Governor George Pataki and New York City Mayor Michael Bloomberg.

In 2007, Neffson authored the catalog to the British painter Clive Head's exhibition at Marlborough Fine Arts, London. The text consists of an introduction and letters between the two artists centered on their discussion of the creative process.

Robert Neffson joined Hammer Galleries in 1998, the New York institution. He has also exhibited at London's Plus One Gallery since 2005. In 2009 he was invited to join the Bernarducci.Meisel Gallery in New York City. The director of the gallery, Louis K. Meisel, originated the phrase Photorealism in 1968, which was first used in a Whitney Museum catalog in 1970. Neffson also began exhibiting with the Albemarle Gallery in London during the same year. He continues to produce works that are exhibited and collected internationally.

== Exhibitions ==
- 2025 “Photorealism in Focus” Rose Art Museum, Brandeis University, Waltham, MA
- 2025 “Real, Surreal, and Photoreal” Nassau County Museum of Art, Roslyn Harbor, NY
- 2025 "PHOTOREALISM IN 2025" Louis K. Meisel Gallery, New York, NY
- 2025 "Robert Neffson: A Survey", Louis K. Meisel Gallery, New York, NY
- 2024 "Scaled--Down" Louis K. Meisel Gallery, New York, NY
- 2024 "Visualizing Schubert" Louis K. Meisel Gallery, New York, NY
- 2023 "Art Miami" Louis K. Meisel Gallery, Miami, Florida, USA
- 2023-24 “Beyond the Lens, Photorealist Perspectives on Looking, Seeing, and Painting” AshevilleArtMuseum, NC.
- 2023 "Fall Selections" Louis K. Meisel Gallery, New York, NY
- 2023 "Spring Selections" Louis K. Meisel Gallery, New York, NY
- 2022 "Art Miami" Louis K. Meisel Gallery, Miami, Florida, USA
- 2022 "Recent Acquisitions" Louis K. Meisel Gallery, New York, NY
- 2022 "Primavera" Louis K. Meisel Gallery, New York, NY
- 2021 "Art Miami" Louis K. Meisel Gallery, Miami, Florida, USA
- 2020 “High Fidelity: Anthony Brunelli and the Digital Age Photorealists” Arnot Art Museum, Elmira, NY
- 2019 "Selected Photorealism" Louis K. Meisel Gallery, New York, NY
- 2019 "Food for Thought" A Selection of Small Works Curated by Susan Meisel, Louis K. Meisel Gallery, New York, NY
- 2019 "Panoramic Views" Louis K. Meisel Gallery, New York, NY
- 2018 "Museum Insider" SOLO show, Louis K. Meisel Gallery, New York, NY
- 2017 "From Lens to Eye to Hand " Parrish Art Museum, Water Mill, NY
- 2017 "Photorealism: 50 Years of Hyperrealistic Painting", Tampa Museum of Art, Tampa, FL
- 2016 "An Historical Overview of Photorealist Cityscapes Robert Bechtle, Richard Estes, John Salt and others" Bernarducci.Meisel Gallery, New York, NY
- 2016 Bernarducci.Meisel Gallery, SOLO show, New York, New York
- 2015 Bernarducci.Meisel Gallery "Cityscape Paintings: Looking From the Outside In, A Group Exhibition" New York, New York
- 2013-2014 "Hyperrealism 1967-2012" Museo Thyssen-Bornemisza Madrid, Spain; Kunstmuseum Thun, Switzerland; Birmingham Museum & Art Gallery, UK; Gemeentemuseum Den Haag, Netherlands; World Cultural Heritage Völklinger Hütte, Germany
- 2013 "The Louis & Susan Meisel Collection" Butler Institute of American Art Youngstown, OH, USA
- 2013 "Photorealism Revisited", Oklahoma City Museum of Art, Oklahoma, USA
- 2012 "Photorealism Painting with a Camera" Kunsthalle Tübingen, Tübingen, Germany
- 2012 Bernarducci.Meisel Gallery, SOLO show, New York, New York
- Robert Neffson is based in New York City, where he lives with his wife, Karin Choy and their dog, Bagel.

Neffson sees the geometry of the city foremost—the parallel lines of the architecture, the grids of the streets and windows, the angular shadows the sun casts between skyscrapers. One of Neffson's fortes is sorting out messy networks of objects, shadows, and reflections in store windows, which he does by systematically breaking down each component into a series of perfect planes.

— ARTNews, November 2004.
