= Valeriy Gridnev =

Valeriy Borissovich Gridnev (Russian: Валерий Борисович Гриднев; born 1956) is a Russian painter based in Saint Petersburg and London, known for portraits of aristocracy.

== Biography ==
Gridnev was born in 1956 in the Urals, Soviet Union, the son of Boris Gridnev. He was educated at Sverdlovsk and St Petersburg Academy of Arts. Gridnev worked from 1990 until 1994 at St. Petersburg Academy of Art's postgraduate studio. Gridnev became noted after his oil painting The Early Years won the Gold Medal of the USSR Academy of Art. He was elected a member of the Russian Artist's Federation, 1991.

In 1999, Gridnev and his family moved to Hampshire, England where he began working as a portrait artist at Highclere Castle. He was hosted and commissioned by Henry Herbert, 7th Earl of Carnarvon, along with his son Lord Porchester at Highclere. His painting of a scene at Del Mar Thoroughbred Club was used as cover artwork for the 2021 Breeders Cup official program. He was initially based in and had showings in Russia, at Saint Petersburg and Moscow most notably, but Gridnev also began exhibiting abroad in America, Germany and Spain. His showings in Britain included Alberti Gallery, Mall Galleries, Cricket Fine Art, Arndean Gallery and Drake Gallery.

In 2003, Gridnev became a member of the Pastel society, and in 2006, a member of the Royal Institute of Oil Painters, and finally in 2011, he became a member of Royal Society of Portrait Painters. He is married to Katya Gridneva, also an artist.
