= Robin-Lee Hall =

British painter (born 1962)

Robin-Lee Hall PPRP
- Born: 1962 (age 63–64)
- Education: BA Hons Fine Art; Saint Martin's School of Art, Kingston Polytechnic
- Notable work: The Late Lord Weatherill; Sir Patrick Moore; Lord Stevenson OBE; Harry Gould
- Style: Fine Art; Egg Tempera; Oil; Drawing
- Awards: The Gold Medal and Ondaatje Prize for Portraiture
- Elected: Past President of The Royal Society of Portrait Painters
- Website: robinleehall.co.uk

Robin-Lee Hall (born 1962) is a Surrey-based English fine artist and former President of the Royal Society of Portrait Painters.

== Biography ==
Born in 1962 in London, Hall attended the Central Saint Martins School of Art and Design and Kingston Polytechnic gaining a BA Honours degree in Fine Art.

=== Career ===
Since 2004 she has painted extensively in the very ancient medium of egg tempera.

In 2008 she was elected a member of the Royal Society of Portrait Painters, having regularly exhibited in their annual exhibition since the mid 1990s.

In 2010 she won the Ondaatje Prize for Portraiture and Gold Medal at the Royal Society of Portrait Painters Annual Exhibition. The winning portrait, ‘Joy’, is now on permanent display at Girton College, Cambridge, as part of ‘The People’s Portraits’ collection.

Hall has exhibited in the BP Portrait Award at the National Portrait Gallery and the Royal Academy Summer Exhibition.

Her portrait of astronomer, Sir Patrick Moore, is in the BBC’s collection and her painting of past Speaker of the House of Commons, Sir Bernard Weatherill, hangs in Portcullis House, Westminster.

In 2009, Hall participated in Antony Gormley’s ‘One and Other’ project, where she painted for one hour on top of the fourth plinth in Trafalgar Square, London.

Hall is a freelance lecturer at the National Gallery and National Portrait Gallery, London.

=== Awards ===
- Ondaatje Prize for Portraiture and Gold Medal at the Royal Society of Portrait Painters Annual Exhibition 2010.
