= Arcmanoro Niles =

American contemporary visual artist

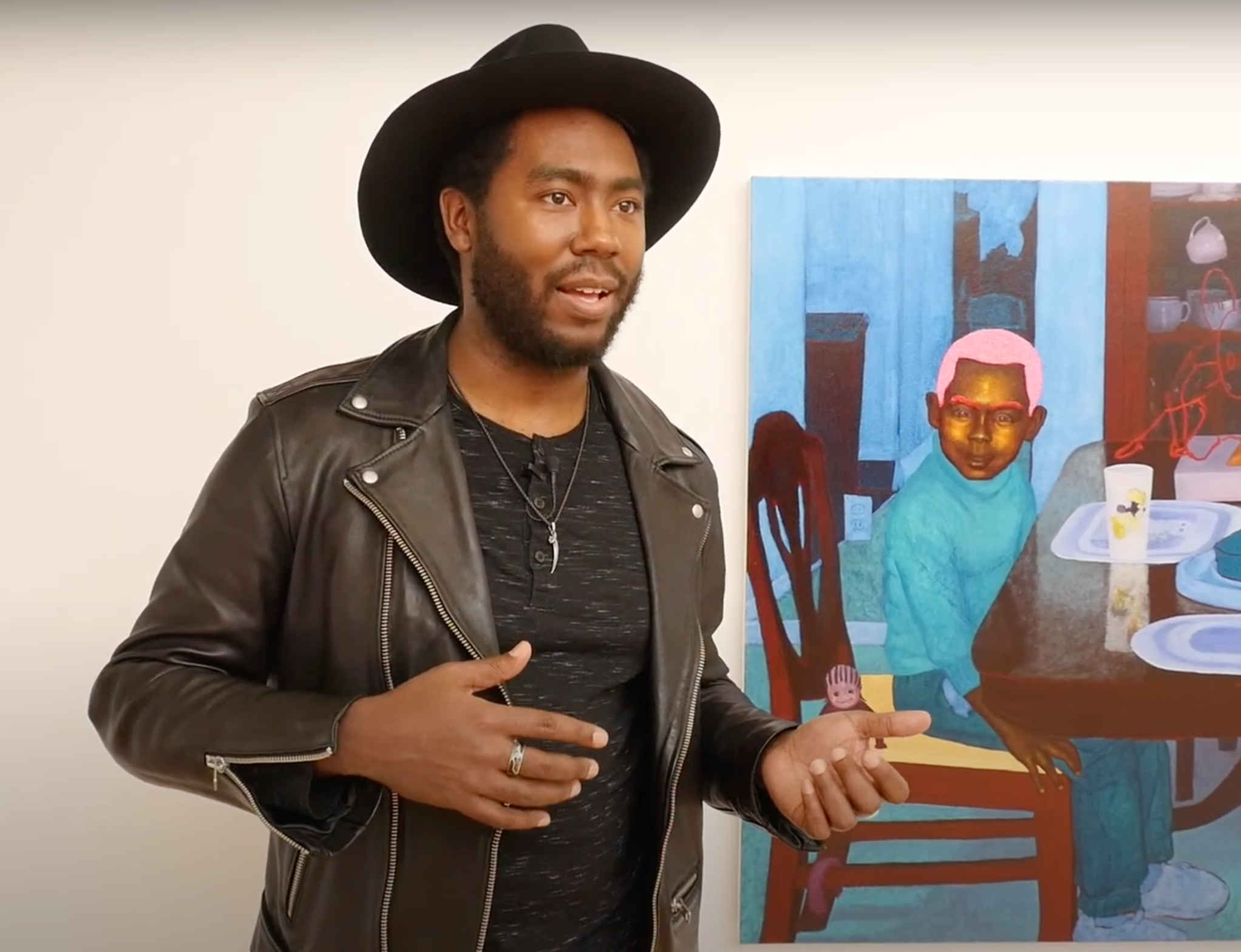
- Arcmanoro Niles in his exhibition at Rachel Uffner Gallery
- Born: 1989 (age 36–37); Washington, D.C.
- Education: Skowhegan School of Painting and Sculpture; New York Academy of Art; Pennsylvania Academy of Fine Arts; School of Art and Design at Montgomery Community College; Washington Studio School; Duke Ellington School of the Arts;
- Style: Figurative painting
- Website: http://www.arcmanoro.com/

Arcmanoro Niles (born 1989 Washington, D.C.) is an American visual artist working in painting. Niles is known for his life-sized portraits in gem-toned hues that focus on African-American contemporary narratives, often depicting individuals in states of psychological negotiation. Niles was born in Washington, D.C., in 1989, and currently lives and works in Brooklyn, New York. He graduated high school from Duke Ellington School of the Arts in 2008, while also attending night classes at Washington Studio School. He later graduated from the School of Art and Design at Montgomery Community College, Silver Spring (2010), Pennsylvania Academy of Fine Arts, Philadelphia (BFA, 2013), and the New York Academy of Art, New York (MFA, 2015). Niles was also an artist in residence at the Skowhegan School of Painting and Sculpture in 2018.

== Biography ==
Niles is known for his life-sized portraits in gem-toned hues that focus on African-American contemporary narratives. His paintings explore everyday events that appear banal, but in fact represent introspective moments in which the subjects are undergoing a shift in consciousness, or significant life changes. Niles explains, "at the end of the day, I am a painter who is interested in color and stories that talk about who we are. Little moments that give us a glimpse into what life feels like." He uses family photographs, as well as his own photographs and memories as references. Friends, family members, and the artist himself often appear in Niles’ paintings.

Niles is a traditionally trained painter. In his works, he references classical portraits while also calling the history of painting into question by using highly saturated color palettes over orange and blue grounds. This creates his distinctive saturated palette which demonstrates complex and luminous, gold-like skin tones. His interest in creating vividly-colored was "a response to his frustration at not being able to achieve the depth of tonality he saw in the skin tones of his family and friends." Niles explains, “I was always interested in color... always trying to pull together all these colors that I saw, or thought I saw, in my darker flesh: bright reds, deep purples and golden tones.” His use of glitter, often on the body hair of his subjects, emphasizes the complexity of color and the identities of the subjects. Niles removed neutral colors from his artistic palette, including blacks, whites, and browns around 2013, which gave way to his interest in a more colorful palette.

In his portraits, Niles often includes what he calls “seekers”, which are small amorphous figures or stick figures that appear along the edges of the paintings. Niles developed the idea of the seekers after visiting the Brooklyn Museum in 2015 and drawing an Egyptian fertility sculpture from the collection. He began including this image in his paintings, which eventually morphed into an inclusion of entities in the form of seekers. These seekers represent the external and internal forces that influence his subjects. They are often depicted using violent, self-destructive, and sexual gestures, that counter the stillness and contemplative nature of the main subjects. “Seekers,” says Niles, “are more impulsive, chasing whatever they think will make them happy in that moment, with no fear of consequence, while the human subjects are more vulnerable and open with their feelings.” The seekers disrupt the compositions, creating otherworldly elements to the painting.

== Solo exhibitions ==
- 2021: Hey Tomorrow, Do You Have Some Room For Me: Failure Is A Part Of Being Alive, Lehmann Maupin, New York (catalogue)
- 2020: I Guess By Now I'm Supposed To Be A Man: I'm Just Trying To Leave Behind Yesterday, UTA Artist Space, Los Angeles (catalogue)
- 2019: My Heart is Like Paper: Let the Old Ways Die, Rachel Uffner Gallery, New York
- 2018: Revisiting the Area, Rachel Uffner Gallery, New York
- 2017: The Arena, Long Gallery, New York (catalogue)
- 2016: AIR Works, Guild Hall, East Hampton
- 2016: Life Was A Party To be Thrown, Beez & Honey, New York

== Public collections ==
- Bronx Museum of the Arts, Bronx, New York
- Dallas Museum of Art, Dallas, Texas
- David C. Driskell Center at the University of Maryland, College Park, Maryland
- Hammer Museum, Los Angeles, California
- Institute of Contemporary Art, Boston, Massachusetts
- Institute of Contemporary Art, Miami, Florida
- The Marieluise Hessel Foundation, Jackson, Wyoming
- Pennsylvania Academy of the Fine Arts, Philadelphia, Pennsylvania
- Petrucci Family Foundation Collection of African American Art, Asbury, New Jersey
- Pérez Art Museum Miami, Miami, Florida
- Phoenix Art Museum, Phoenix, Arizona
- Pond Society, Shanghai, China
- The Studio Museum in Harlem, New York, New York
- Yuz Museum Shanghai, Shanghai, China

== Awards ==
- 2019: Louis Comfort Tiffany Foundation Grant
- 2018: Elizabeth Greenshields Foundation Grant
- 2017: Joan Mitchell Foundation Painters & Sculptors Grant
- 2017: Elizabeth Greenshields Foundation Grant
- 2016: Scott & Patricia PGTA Award, New York Academy of Art
- 2013: The Lance Roy Lauffer Memorial Prize, Pennsylvania Academy of Fine Arts
- 2013: Benjamin West Clinedinst Memorial Medal, Artists’ Fellowship, Inc.
- 2012: The Fred and Naomi Hazel Memorial Art Award for Fine Arts, Pennsylvania Academy of the Fine Arts
- 2012: The Cecilia Beaux Memorial Prize, Pennsylvania Academy of the Fine Arts
- 2010: The American Artists Professional League’s American Artists Fund Award

== Publications ==
- Biswas, Allie, and Anna Stothart. Arcmanoro Niles: Hey Tomorrow, Do You Have Some Room For Me: Failure Is A Part Of Being Alive. Edited by Alejandro Jassan. New York: Lehmann Maupin, 2021.
- Sargent, Antwaun, Thomas Lax, Jamillah James, Jessica Brown, Graham Boettcher, Connie H. Choi, Anthony Graham, et al. Young, Gifted and Black: A New Generation of Artists: The Lumpkin-Boccuzzi Family Collection of Contemporary Art. Edited by Antwaun Sargent. New York: D.A.P., 2020.
- UTA Artist Space. I Guess By Now I'm Supposed To Be A Man: I'm Just Trying To Leave Behind Yesterday. Los Angeles: UTA Artist Space, 2019.
- Mitchell, Frank, Berrisford Boothe, Claudia Highbaugh, and Kristin Hass. Afrocosmologies: American Reflections. Hartford: Wadsworth Atheneum Museum of Art, The Amistad Center for Art & Culture, 2019.
- Cooper Cafritz, Peggy. Fired Up! Ready to Go!: Finding Beauty, Demanding Equity: An African American Life in Art. The Collections of Peggy Cooper Cafritz. New York: Rizzoli International Publications, 2018.
- McGee, Julie L. Portraits of Who We Are. College Park: David C. Driskell Center at the University of Maryland, 2018.
- Long Gallery Harlem. The Arena: Arcmanoro Niles. New York: Long Gallery Harlem, 2017.
