= Andrew Festing =

British artist (born 1941)

- Born: Andrew Festing; 30 November 1941 (age 84); Northumberland, United Kingdom
- Known for: Painting

Andrew Thomas Festing MBE PPRP (born 30 November 1941) is a British portrait painter, and fellow and former president of the Royal Society of Portrait Painters.

== Life ==
Andrew Festing was born on 30 November 1941, the third son of four boys of Field Marshal Sir Francis Festing and Mary Cecilia Riddell. He was brought up in Northumberland, and educated at Ampleforth College and Royal Military Academy Sandhurst. He was commissioned into The Rifle Brigade (Prince Consort's Own), part of The Royal Green Jackets from 1966, in 1961 where he served until 1969. In 1968 he married Virginia Fyffe, and has one daughter – Charlotte – and two grandchildren.

Festing worked at Sotheby's in 1969 and was head of the British Pictures Department from 1977–1981, where he became Sotheby’s chief expert for British Pictures, with specialist knowledge of portrait painting over the last 400 years. He painted many portraits whilst in the army and at Sotheby's, and took up full-time portrait painting in 1981.

Festing became a member of the Royal Society of Portrait Painters (RP) in 1989, and was President (PRP) from 2002–2008. In 2008, he was made a Member of the Order of the British Empire (MBE) for services to the arts. In 2010 he was also awarded an Honorary Doctorate of Letters from Northumbria University.

Notable commissions include Queen Elizabeth II and other members of the British royal family on a number of occasions; official portraits of the House of Commons of the United Kingdom and the House of Lords in session; official portraits of Speakers Boothroyd and Martin; four group portraits of English cricket players in the last 40 years for Lord's; six group portraits of the staff at Holkham Hall in Norfolk. Festing has painted some 750 portraits in the last 30 years.

His portraits can be found in the Royal Collections, the National Portrait Gallery, the National Gallery of Ireland, The Palace of Westminster and many of the major private and public collections in Britain. He exhibited annually at the Royal Society of Portrait Painters.

Festing also paints landscapes, still lifes and watercolours. He has studios in central London and in Northumberland.

== Sources ==
- Hiskey, Christine (2016). Holkham: the social, architectural and landscape history of a great English country house. Norwich: Unicorn Press. ISBN 978-1-910-06598-3.
- Pery, Jenny (2015). Andrew Festing : Face Value. Third Millennium Publishing. ISBN 9781908990518.
