= Liste Art Fair Basel =

Annual art festival in Basel, Switzerland

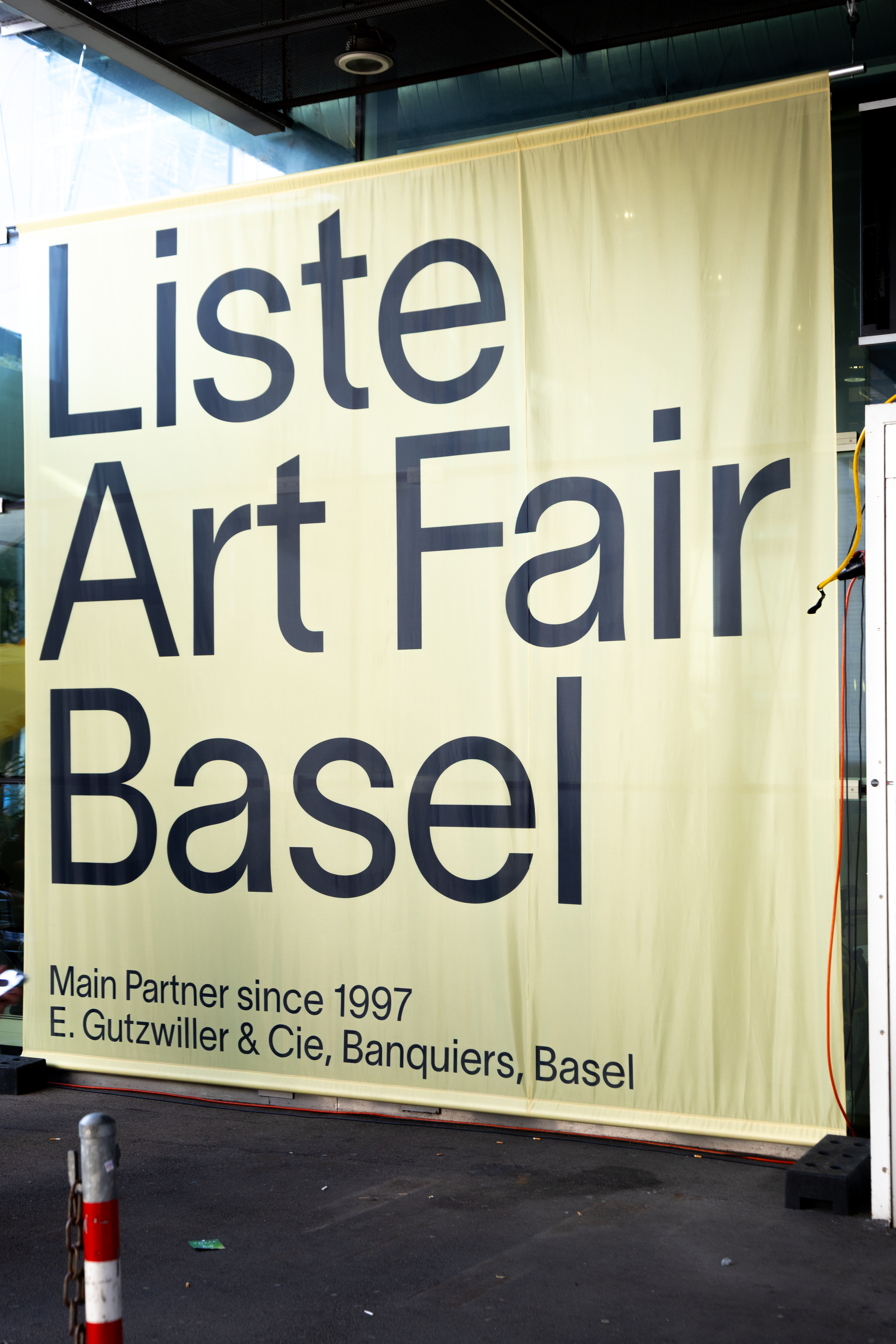
- Banner outside of Messe Basel
- Industry: Art
- Founded: 1996; 30 years ago in Basel, Switzerland
- Founders: Peter Bläuer; Eva Presenhuber
- Products: Art fairs

The Liste Art Fair Basel is an annual art festival taking place in Basel, Switzerland. Run by the Liste Foundation Basel and the Friends of Liste every year, it brings together nearly a hundred galleries, from dozens of countries, with many of them making their debut showing there and/or leaning toward "experimental artwork." It generally coincides with Art Basel week, in June.

The art festival has been written about and anticipated each year by publications like Artsy, Artnet, FAD Magazine, Contemporary Lynx, e-flux, and others.

== Programming ==
In addition to hosting galleries from across the world and in many different disciplines, the Liste Art Fair Basel also includes a wide range of events including performances, panels, readings, workshops, children's activities, and guided tours.

The Friends of Liste organization also financially supports a select few galleries every year.

== History ==
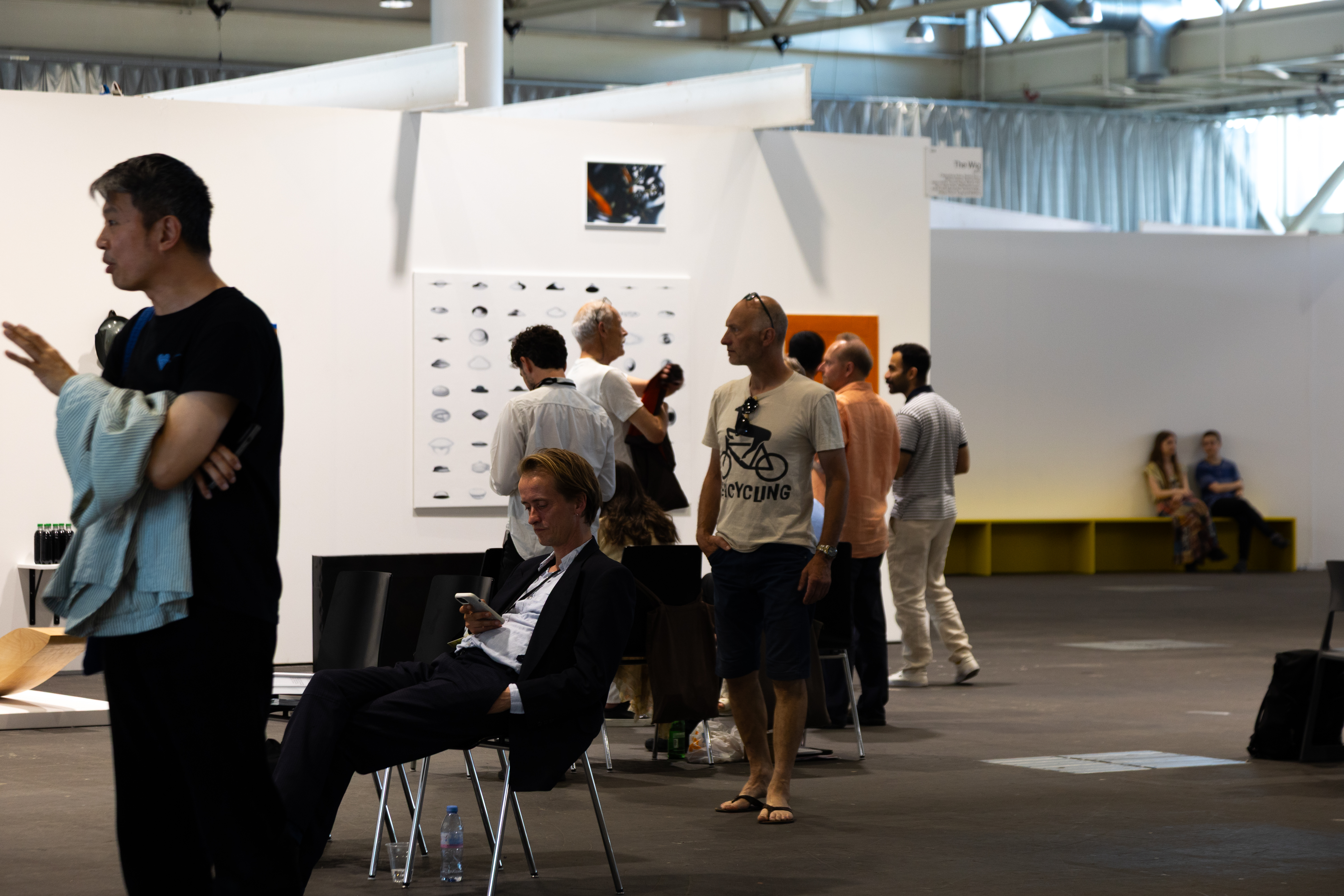
The art festival in 2025.

The art festival was founded in 1996, by Peter Bläuer and Eva Presenhuber, to showcase "new and self-assured generation of gallerists and artists." It initially drew controversy for prohibiting artists over the age of 40 from participating. Emerging talent it platformed early on includes the David Zwirner Gallery, as well as artists like Elizabeth Peyton and Carol Bove.

In 2020, the Liste Foundation Basel launched Liste Showtime Online, a digital exhibition space for galleries to present in.

In 2020, the art festival was canceled due to the COVID-19 pandemic. In 2021, the art festival moved from the Warteck Brewery to its current location, Messe Basel in the Messeplatz, as an accommodation for pandemic circumstances. Since then, it has continued to run in the Messeplatz. In 2025, it celebrated its thirtieth anniversary with the tagline, "The Art Fair for Galleries of a New Generation."

Liste's current director is Nikola Dietrich. Taking over from Joanna Kamm, she began heading the art festival as of September 1, 2024, in anticipation of its thirtieth anniversary.
