= Hita von Mende =

- Born: Germany
- Occupation: Artist

Hita von Mende is an American painter born in Germany and grew up in Minnesota. She is known for exploring themes of the American West and the landscapes of the Pacific Northwest, blending traditional and modern artistic styles as well as contributions to theater and ballet set design. Von Mende's work is in many public collections including the Clymer Museum and has been featured in the TV series Longmire.

== Early life and education ==
Hita von Mende was born in Germany but spent much of her childhood in Minnesota, where she received a BA in Art at the University of Minnesota. She eventually settled in Washington state, where she has lived on Vashon Island since 1975. Her family life and raising foals, has further shaped her connection to rural and dynamic landscapes.

== Career ==
Her transatlantic upbringing influenced her artistic perspective, imbuing her works with a fusion of European artistic traditions and the expansive energy of the American West. Von Mende’s oil paintings predominantly focus on the themes of the American West. Her subjects include cowboys, cowgirls, ranchers, horses, cattle, and the vast, mythic landscapes that define the region. Her work is distinguished by its expressive use of color and dynamic compositions, drawing comparisons to German Expressionism and Cubism. Many of her paintings, such as "Pickup Men" and "Showdown", capture the kinetic energy of rodeos and the rugged beauty of rural life. Von Mende’s work also extends to urban landscapes, as seen in pieces like "Barge on the River" and "Urban Hideaway: Boat Houses", which reflect her fascination with industrial and maritime themes in the Puget Sound.

Related to her career in painting, von Mende has a background in set design. She has contributed to productions such as "Oklahoma!", "The Music Man", and "Fiddler on the Roof" with Drama Dock on Vashon Island. She has also designed sets for ballet productions, including "The Nutcracker" and "Peter and the Wolf" for Olympic Ballet Theatre.

She has also collaborated on exhibitions with other artists, including two years with artist John Podrebarac, workshops with David Leffel, Daniel Greene, Wm. F. Reese, and Ray Vinella. Her latest collaboration "Air & Water" at the VALISE gallery in 2023, where she displayed works alongside her son, Jesse Johnson.

Hita von Mende continues to live and work on Vashon Island, where she draws inspiration from the natural scenery of Puget Sound and the traditions of the American West.

== Selected public collections ==
Von Mende’s paintings have been widely exhibited and are held in private and corporate collections. Highlights include:

- Clymer Museum, Ellensburg, WA
- Due West Gallery, Santa Fe, NM

== Awards and honors ==
- 1st Place Puget Sound Energy Purchase Award, 2006
- Ellensburg National Rodeo Poster Award, 2004
- Featured Poster Artist: National Western Art Show, 2014
- Artist of The Month: DueWest Gallery in Santa Fe, 2013
- Vashon Allied Arts Commission, Vashon
