= Anastasia Pollard =

American-born English painter

Anastasia Pollard is an American-born English painter.

== Life and career ==
Pollard was raised in Virginia and educated at the Pennsylvania Academy of Fine Arts. She then attended the Florence Academy of Art before apprenticing from 1993 to 1995. Pollard has lived in London since 2006.

Pollard won the Ondaatje Prize for Portraiture at the Royal Society of Portrait Painters Annual Exhibition for 2009.

Pollard is a member of the Royal Society of Portrait Painters, a founder of the London Atelier for Representational Art (LARA).

== Awards ==
- Ondaatje Prize for Portraiture at the Royal Society of Portrait Painters Annual Exhibition (2009)
- The Artist's House Gallery Award (2000)
- Gross McCleaf Gallery Prize (2000)
- Earl T. Donelson Figure Painting Award (2000)
- Hobson Pittman Memorial Prize, Special Notice (2000)
- The William Emlen Cresson Scholarship (1999)
- Linda Lee Alter Award (1999)
- Celia Beaux Memorial Prize (1999)
- Melvin Paul and Pearl Miller Carpel Award
- Lucille Sorgenti Scholarship (1999)
- Silvia S. and Miron M. Walley Memorial Scholarship (1999)
- Benjamin West Prize (1999)
