= Melissa Scott-Miller =

Melissa Scott-Miller (born 1959, in London) is an English artist.

== Biography ==
Scott-Miller studied art at the Slade School of Fine Art. Scott-Miller has exhibited at the Mark Jason Gallery and the New English Art Club, Hunting/Observer Art Prizes, The Mall Galleries; A T Kearney; BP Portrait Award; The London Group, in the National Collection and on 17 occasions at the Royal Academy Summer Exhibition.

In 1999, Scott-Miller was elected a member of the Royal Society of Portrait Painters. She has won several awards, including the 2008 Lynn Painter-Stainers Prize, worth £15,000. She also won a prize at The South Bank Picture Show and won The Lucy Morrison Award, Royal Overseas League and the Elizabeth Greenshields Foundation Scholarship.

She is a teacher at Heatherley’s School of Fine Art, London.
