= Hugh De Twenebrokes Glazebrook =

British portrait painter

Hugh De Twenebrokes Glazebrook (1855–1937) was a British portrait painter renowned for his elegant depictions of women and notable public figures.

== Early life ==
Glazebrook was born in Hampstead, London, in 1855 and received his early education at Dulwich College. He had formal art training at the South Kensington Art School, studying under Edward Poynter, and later continued his studies in Paris with the portraitist Léon Bonnat. His time in Paris, as well as his visits to art centres across Europe, greatly influenced his approach to portraiture.

== Career ==
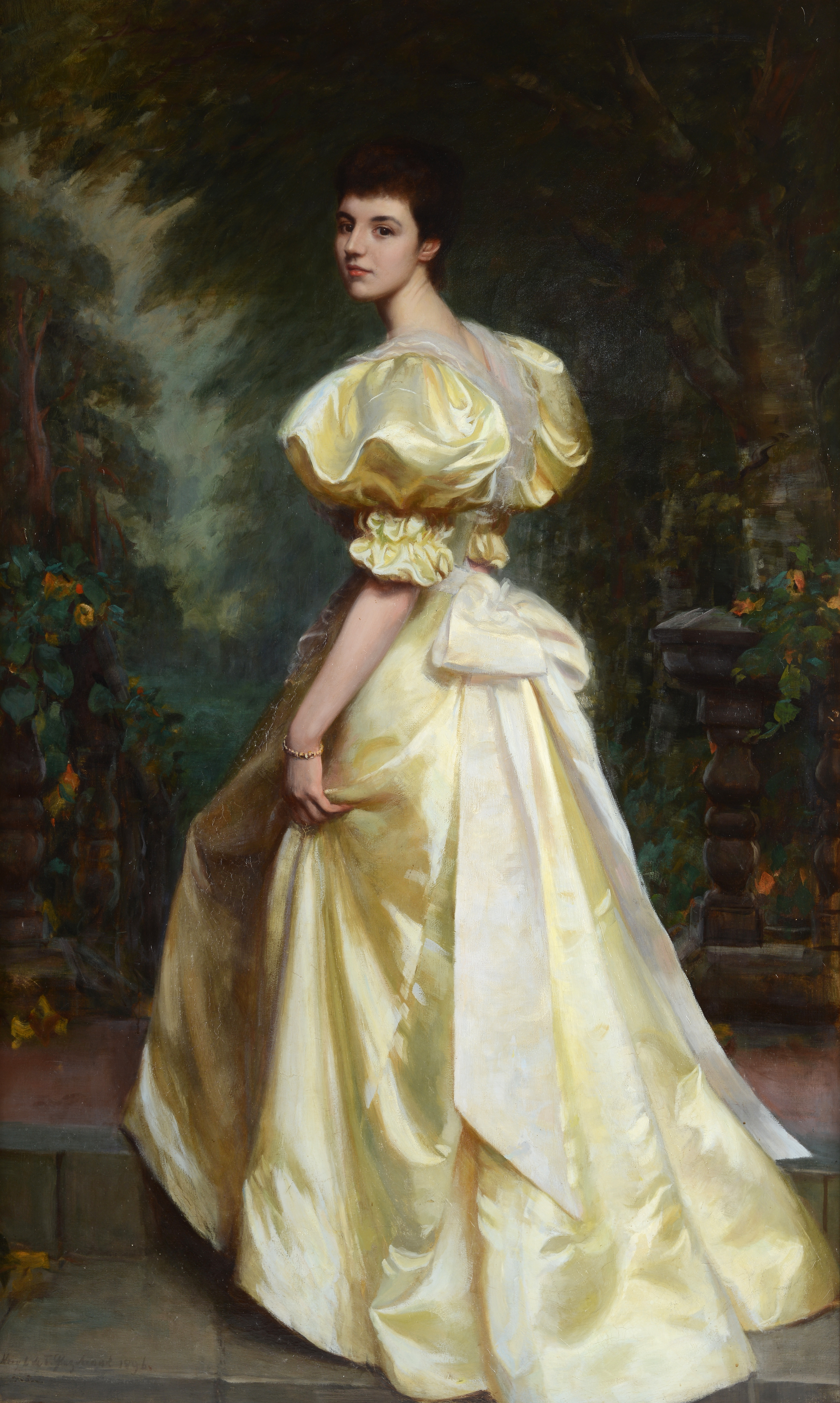
Hugh De Twenebrokes Glazebrook, Portrait of a Lady, 1896

Primarily recognized for his portraits, Glazebrook occasionally produced genre scenes. His portraits of women became particularly well-regarded, and he gained significant attention in the British art scene. He exhibited four times at the Grosvenor Gallery and regularly showed his works at the Royal Academy from 1885 to 1904.

In 1891, Glazebrook was elected to the Royal Society of Portrait Painters, further solidifying his status as one of Britain's leading portrait artists of the time. One of his standout works, C'est l'Empereur (1890), was exhibited at both the Royal Academy and the Société des Artistes Français, where it garnered international acclaim, earning a medal at the Paris International Exhibition of 1900.

== Notable works and exhibitions ==
Glazebrook's career achievements included having his portraits housed in several notable collections. His painting of Alfred Milner is in the collection of the National Portrait Gallery in London. He is also represented in the Privy Council Chamber and the National Gallery of Canada in Ottawa.

Glazebrook was active in exhibiting between 1885 and 1928, showing at the Royal Academy, Royal Society of Portrait Painters, Grosvenor Gallery, Fine Arts Society, London Salon and New Gallery in London, as well as at the Royal Society of Artists in Birmingham, Glasgow Institute of the Fine Arts, Royal Hibernian Academy, Walker Art Gallery in Liverpool and Manchester City Art Gallery. In 1891 he was elected a member of the Royal Society of Portrait Painters.

== Personal life and legacy ==
Glazebrook's success as an artist allowed him to enjoy a lavish lifestyle. He spent his later years in Alassio, Italy, a fashionable resort town, where he continued his artistic pursuits. He appears in the publication Prominent Men of London (1907–1909). (Note: Prominent men of London: A collection of portraits of men who by their genius, learning and ability have attained distinction in the premier city of the world – London. London: Shaftesbury Press, 1907–1909. OCLC 820417469.)

In 1891, Glazebrook married Florence Singleton Wilson, with whom he lived in Kensington before eventually settling in Italy. She died in 1931, and Glazebrook remained in Italy until his own death in 1937. Some speculate that Florence may have been the mysterious sitter in some of Glazebrook's works, adding an emotional depth to his artistic legacy.
