= Teresa Dunn =

Mexican-American painter (born 1976)

- Born: 1976 (age 49–50)
- Occupation: Painter
- Website: https://teresa-dunn.com/

"The Ballad of Ameenah Shareef Asante (Ode to my Ancestors)," 2021, oil on linen.

Teresa Dunn (born 1976) is a Mexican-American painter and educator known for her colorful paintings of people. Raised in rural southern Illinois, her work is often influenced by her racial and cultural heritage. Dunn's work has been exhibited around the United States and is in the permanent collections of institutions including the Dennos Museum Center and the Zillman Art Museum at the University of Maine.

Dunn studied at Indiana University Bloomington, where she earned a Master of Fine Arts in 2002. She is a three-time recipient of the Elizabeth Greenshields Foundation Fellowship. In addition to creating and exhibiting artwork, she conducts visiting artist lectures. Dunn has taught as Associate Professor of Painting and Drawing at Michigan State University since 2006.

== Work ==
Dunn has spoken on navigating the intersection of multiple cultures. In a 2021 interview, she said, "In the last few years, I accept that a large part of who I am and what I make has been about disconnect, absurdity, non sequitur, and relationships the misalign. ... Instead of focusing solely on my personal struggle, I am painting the stories of other people with complex racial and cultural identities, too."
