= Jo Fraser =

Scottish artist (born 1986)

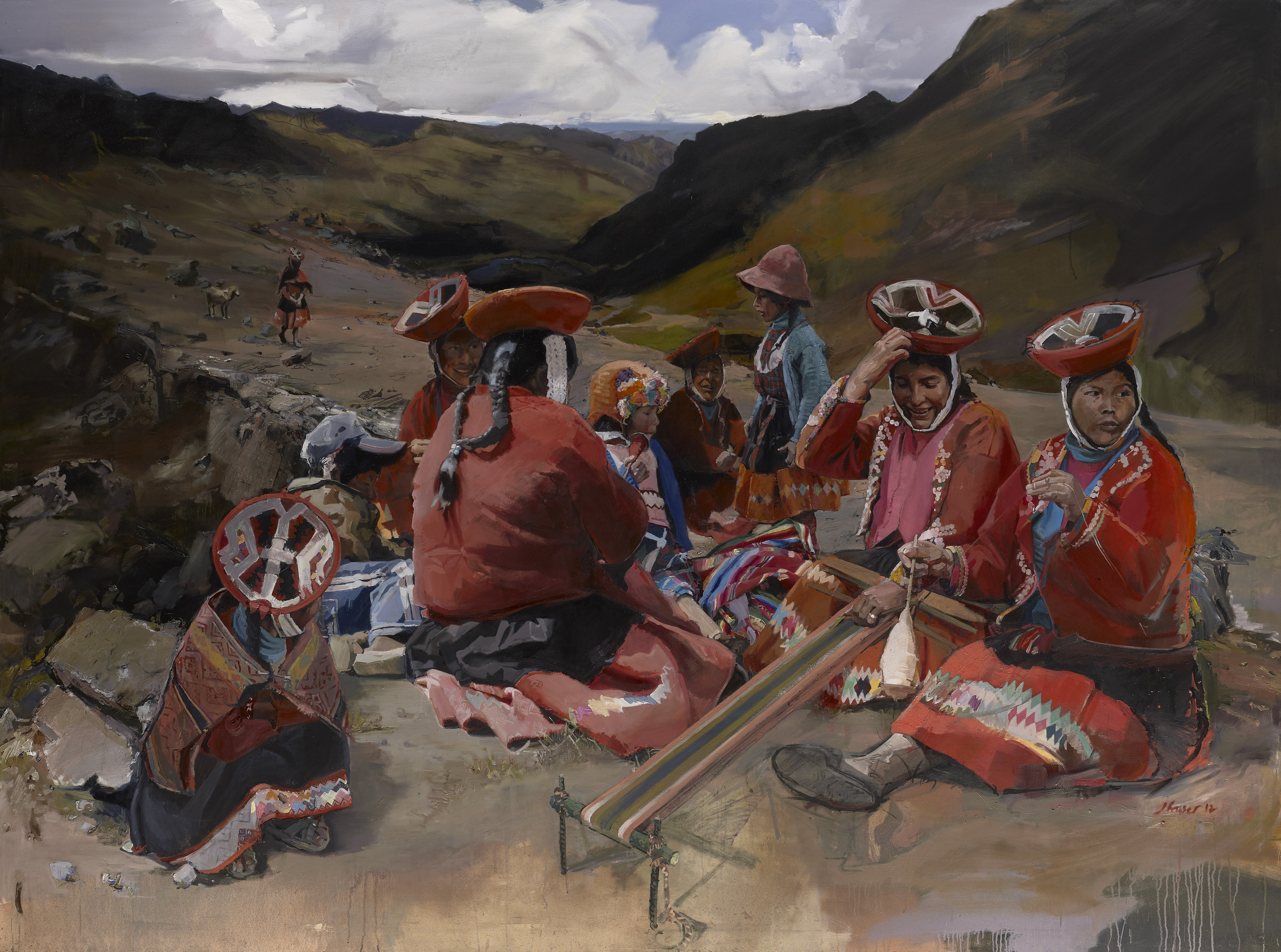
- 'The Weavers', BP Portrait Travel Award 2012
- Born: 12 December 1986 (age 39); Edinburgh, Scotland
- Education: Duncan of Jordanstone College of Art and Design
- Known for: Painting
- Notable work: "The Weavers" series
- Awards: BP Portrait Award Travel Award 2011
- Website: www.jofraser.co.uk

Jo Fraser (born 12 December 1986) is a Scottish painter. She won the BP Portrait Award Travel Award 2011 in London.

== Biography ==
Jo Fraser is a Scottish portrait painter, most notably winning the BP Portrait Travel Award at The BP Portrait Award exhibition 2011 in London. Following her BP Travel Award win, Fraser spent two months in Peru, within an indigenous community of Quechua weavers in the small, mountainous village of Patacancha. Her work from this time was exhibited in London at The BP Portrait Award exhibition 2012.

Fraser was educated at George Watson's College and later received a first class Honours degree in BA Fine Art from Duncan of Jordanstone College of Art and Design.

In 2011, Fraser was commissioned by Harvey Nichols for The Elephant Family charity to design and paint a sculpture for The exhibition Edinburgh Jungle City, which was displayed above the front canopy of the Edinburgh Harvey Nichols Store. She designed and executed a Faberge egg for The Big Faberge Egg Hunt 2014 in NYC, which was exhibited in Bryant Park.

== Awards, bursaries and television appearances ==
- 2014 Elizabeth Greenshields Foundation Award
- 2012 Elizabeth Greenshields Foundation Award
- 2011 BP Portrait Travel Award Winner
- 2011 BP Portrait Award Exhibitor, National Portrait Gallery, London
- 2011 Artist In Residence, Edinburgh Academy, Edinburgh
- 2010 Elizabeth Greenshields Foundation Award 2010
- 2008 Ian Eadie Award, Duncan of Jordanstone College of Art and Design
- 2008 Short-listed for The Boundary Gallery Figurative Art Prize
- 2006 ITV Scotland, 'A Brush With Fame: The search for Britain's best portrait painter'
- 2004 Senior Bursary Award in The Creative Arts, Edinburgh
- 2004 The Robert Paterson Prize, GWC
- 2003 The John Gray Memorial Prize, GWC
- 2002 The London Watsonian Club Prize, GWC
- 2001 The Robert Merson Prize, GWC
