= Heinemann Library =

Heinemann Library is an imprint of American book publishing company Capstone Publishers. It used to be a part of the educational publishing branch of the British book publishing company Heinemann.
