= Threadneedle Prize =

Art prize

The Columbia Threadneedle Prize (formerly The Threadneedle Prize) is a major art prize, which showcases contemporary figurative art. It was launched by the Mall Galleries in 2008. The prize is open to any artist, eighteen or over, who is living or working in the UK or Continental Europe. The prize is named after the asset management firm, Columbia Threadneedle Investments.

== Background ==
The Threadneedle Prize was launched in 2008 to support the popular interest in figurative art. It was organised by the Federation of British Artists and offered a prize of £25,000. The new competition coincided with a move by the rival Turner Prize away from painting and sculpture and, in some eyes, becoming "trivial and dull". Art critic Brian Sewell welcomed the new prize, though complained that the majority of entries were disappointing, concluding that the "new prize is capable of achieving a greater good than any other, but it must, without becoming quite as predictable as the Turner Prize... achieve next year a far higher level of distinction."

In 2009, almost half of the 80 final exhibits at the Mall Galleries were portrait paintings in a wide variety of styles.

By 2013, the number of exhibits had increased to 111, chosen from over 3,500 entries.

== Prizes ==
In the first year of the competition, there was a single prize of £25,000. In 2010 the Visitors’ Choice Prize, worth £10,000, was introduced. The two major prizes available are the Threadneedle Prize and the Visitor’ Choice Prize. In 2012 the Threadneedle Prize was increased from £25,000 to £30,000 making it the largest prize for single work of art in the UK. For the Threadneedle Prize, a panel of selectors shortlist six works and then choose the winner of the £30,000 prize. Two finalists for the Visitors' Choice Prize are awarded £500. Each of the five finalists for the Threadneedle Prize receives £1,000. In 2013, there were eight prizes totalling £46,000.

Selectors have included artists, critics and curators Peter Randall-Page, Ed Vaizey, Michael Sandle, Jock McFadyen, Daphne Todd, Richard Cork and Desmond Shawe-Taylor.

In 2016, the £20,000 winner - Salt in Tea by Lewis Hazelwood-Horner - was also named the winner of the £10,000 Visitors' Choice Award.

Following the 2016 exhibition at Mall Galleries, London, selected works from the Prize toured to Palazzo Strozzi in Florence, Italy.

== Prize winners ==
2018

Winner - Ana Schmidt, Dead End
Visitors' Choice - Emily Allchurch, Babel Britain

2016

Winner - Lewis Hazelwood-Horner, Salt in Tea
Visitors' Choice - Lewis Hazelwood-Horner, Salt in Tea

2014

Winner - Tina Jenkins, Bed Head
Visitors' Choice - Ben Johnson, Room of the Revolutionary

2013

Joint winner - Clare McCormack, Dead Labour/Dead Labourer
Joint winner - Lisa Wright, The Guilty's Gaze on the Innocent
Visitors' Choice - Conrad Engelhardt, Aung San Suu Kyi

2012

Winner - Ben Greener, My Feet
Visitors' Choice - Robert Truscott, Defeat

2011

Winner - Henrietta Simson, Bad Government
Visitors' Choice - Nicholas McLeod, Drained

2010

Winner - Patricia Cain, Building the Riverside Museum
Visitors' Choice - Fionnuala Boyd and Les Evans, Clee Hill 2009

2009

Winner - Sheila Wallis
Emerging Artist Prize - Aishan Yu

2008

Winner - Nina Murdoch, Untitled
Selectors' Choice - Tim Shaw, Tank on Fire

== Selectors ==
2018

Pipa Stockdale, Jennifer McRae, Helen Pheby, Lewis McNaught

2016

Emma Crichton-Miller, David Dawson, Dr Arturo Galansino, Dr Tim Knox

2014

John Martin, Kevin Francis Gray, Nancy Durrant, Whitney Hintz

2013

Tim Shaw, Barnaby Wright, Paul Benney, Laura Gascoigne

2012

Nicholas Usherwood, Peter Randall-Page, Christopher Riopelle

2011

Julie Lomax, Lisa Milroy, Godfrey Worsdale

2010

Dr Xavier Bray, David Rayson, Michael Sandle RA

2009

Jock McFadyen, Cathy Lomax, Michael Leonard, Desmond Shawe-Taylor, Daphne Todd OBE, Nine Murdoch

2008

Richard Cork, Angela Flowers, Hew Locke, William Packer, Brian Sewell

== See also ==
- List of European art awards
