= Hesketh Hubbard Art Society =

Life drawing society based in London

The Hesketh Hubbard Art Society is the largest life drawing society in London. It was founded in 1930 and has been meeting regularly since then.

== History and activities ==
The Hesketh Hubbard Art Society has been holding weekly life drawing classes since its foundation in 1930. It was originally a club within the Royal Society of British Arts. It is one of the 9 member societies that form the Federation of British Artists and holds its meetings in the federation's Mall Galleries, next to Trafalgar Square.

There are 50 meetings annually with three life models and one portrait model in poses of varying duration. The sessions are untutored and open to amateurs and professionals alike. Prospective members are asked to show a selection of work.

An early member was Grace Golden (1904 – 1993), author, illustrator and artist, an extensive collection of whose work is in the Museum of London. The society awarded a first prize to Leonard Bennetts (1933 – 2005), a New Zealand artist who settled in London and described himself as "the original retrogressionist (the way forwards is backwards)". Colin McMillan (born 1923) has been a president of the society and a member for 20 years. He began painting in the Royal Navy and his work is in the Imperial War Museum. Ray Denton, a winner of the Charles Pears prize at the Royal Society of Marine Artists was a member of the society, till leaving London in 1996.

The current president of the society is Simon Whittle, and the vice-president, David Cottingham.

== See also ==
- Federation of British Artists
