= Nina Murdoch (artist) =

British painter

Nina Murdoch (born 1970) is a British painter, winner of the first Threadneedle Prize in 2008.

Murdoch graduated from the Slade School of Fine Art followed by a postgraduate diploma at the Royal Academy of Arts in London.

Murdoch paints on large canvases using egg tempera on gesso, with a subject matter normally drawn from visits to the streets of South London. Each painting can be made of up to 100 layers of medium, added then scraped back, which restricts her output to between 8 and 10 paintings per year.

In 2008 Murdoch was winner of the inaugural Threadneedle Prize for figurative art, winning £25,000 for her Untitled painting of light on a pavement.

In 2010 Murdoch joined the list of artists represented by Marlborough Fine Art, London. She has had three shows with Marlborough, Shedding Light in 2011, Enlightenment in 2014, and Collecting Colour in 2018.

In November 2019, Murdoch won the ING Discerning Eye prize.
