= Nicolas Granger-Taylor =

Nicolas Granger-Taylor (born 1963) is a contemporary artist whose work primarily comprises portraits, female nudes, and still lifes, painted in oil on canvas. His work has been exhibited at the Royal Academy, London, and the Metropolitan Museum of Art, New York.

== Education ==
Nicolas Granger-Taylor was educated at Latymer Upper School, Hammersmith. He began his art training at Kingston Polytechnic (1981–82), followed by a three-year degree course in Fine Art at Bristol Polytechnic (1982–85). He took a Postgraduate Diploma in Painting the Royal Academy Schools, London (1987–90).

== Critical reception ==
Nicholas Usherwood in the RA Magazine wrote: "He is obsessed by light and power of light, as it reveals objects both animate and inanimate, to create a disturbing sense, in de Chirico's memorable phrase, 'of still lifes come alive or figures become still'." Mary Rose Beaumont wrote in the Art Review: "A fine draughtsman with a firm grasp of composition, Granger-Taylor combines sensuous handling of the paint with a sensitive feeling for his subject."

== Solo exhibitions ==
- 1988 Cadogan Contemporary, London
- 1991 Waterman Fine Art, London
- 1993 Waterman Fine Art, London
- 1999 Offer Waterman & Co, London
- 2003 Offer Waterman & Co, London
- 2011 Jonathan Cooper, Park Walk Gallery, London
- 2013 Jonathan Cooper, Park Walk Gallery, London

== Group exhibitions ==
- 1986 The South Bank Picture Show, Royal Festival Hall, London
- 1987 John Player Portrait Award, National Portrait Gallery, London
- 1987 Summer Exhibition, Royal Academy of Arts, London
- 1987 The South Bank Picture Show, Royal Festival Hall, London
- 1988 The South Bank Picture Show, Royal Festival Hall, London
- 1989 Summer Exhibition, Royal Academy of Arts, London
- 1990 B.P. Portrait Award, National Portrait Gallery, London
- 1991 The NatWest 90’s Prize for Art, NatWest Tower, London
- 1992 Summer Exhibition, Royal Academy of Arts, London
- 1992 The Discerning Eye, Mall Galleries, London
- 1995 B.P. Portrait Award, National Portrait Gallery, London
- 1995 Ten British Artists, Waterman Fine Art, London
- 1996 Small Interiors, Metropolitan Museum of Art, New York
- 1997 Modern British Art, Offer Waterman & Co, London
- 1998 Modern British Art, Offer Waterman & Co., London
- 2005 Christmas Show, Browse and Darby, London
- 2006 Summer Exhibition, Royal Academy of Arts, London

== Awards ==
- 1987 John Player Portrait Award, Special Commendation
- 1990 Elizabeth Greenshields Foundation Award
- 1990 Richard Ford Award
- 1999 Elizabeth Greenshields Foundation Award

== Bibliography ==
- Nicholas Usherwood, “Preview”, RA Magazine, Number 33, Winter 1991, p. 19
- Giles Auty, “Ample figures”, The Spectator, 9 November 1991, pp. 63–64
- Mary Rose Beaumont, “Nicolas Granger-Taylor”, Arts Review, 15 November 1991, p. 580
- Rory Snookes, “Nicolas Granger-Taylor”, Apollo, February 1992, p. 128
- Felicity Owen, “Brushes with youthful talent”, Country Life, 4 February 1993, pp. 30–33
- Mary Rose Beaumont, “Nicolas Granger-Taylor”, Art Review, May 1993, p. 86
- Giles Auty, “Do I see lemons?” The Spectator, 15 May 1993, p. 46
- Julian Halsby, “In Conversation”, The Artist, May 1993, pp. 10–12
- Helen Gould, “Back to Life”, Artists and Illustrators, November 1997, pp. 30–33
- Andrew Devonshire, Accidents of Fortune, Michael Russell Ltd, 2004, p. 115 & colour plate
