= Royal Society of Portrait Painters =

Art society promoting the appreciation and practice of painted portraiture

Coordinates: 51°30′23.35″N 0°7′49.66″W

The Royal Society of Portrait Painters

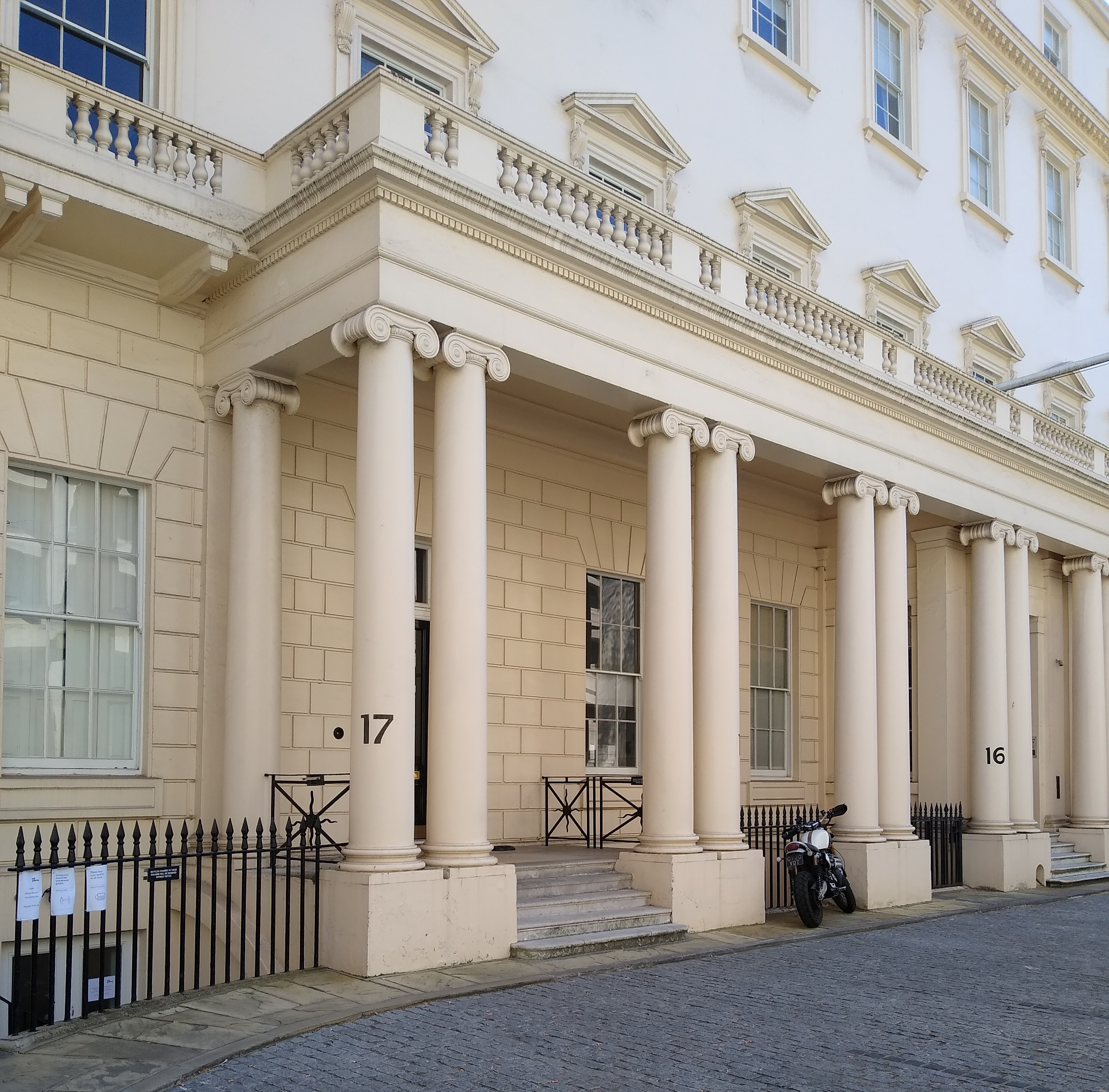
- Established: 1891; 135 years ago
- Type: Arts Society
- Legal status: Registered charity
- Location(s): London, SW1; United Kingdom
- Key people: Queen Elizabeth II (Late Patron); Richard Foster PRP (President); Simon Davis VPRP (Vice President)
- Website: therp.co.uk

The Royal Society of Portrait Painters is a charity based at Carlton House Terrace, SW1, London that promotes the practice and appreciation of portraiture art.

Its Annual Exhibition of portraiture is held at Mall Galleries, and it runs a commissions service to help those wanting a portrait throughout the year. Activities include artist Prizes, Awards, demonstrations, workshops, debates and talks.

The Society is a member of the Federation of British Artists.

== History ==
The Royal Society of Portrait Painters was founded in 1891 by the leading portrait painters of the day. Being dissatisfied with the selection policies of the Royal Academy for its annual exhibition in London, they formed a new body to be concerned solely with portrait painting.

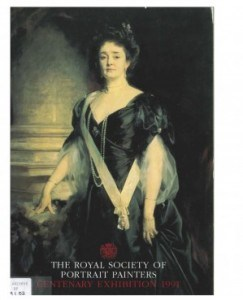
Centenary Catalogue Cover – The Royal Society of Portrait Painters

The first exhibition of the society was held in 1891. The catalogue of that exhibition shows that its committee then consisted of Archibald Stuart-Wortley (Chairman), Hon. John Collier, Arthur Hacker, George Percy Jacomb-Hood, S.J. Solomon, James Jebusa Shannon and Hubert Vos. The other members listed were Percy Bigland, C. A. Furse, Glazebrook, John McLure Hamilton, Heywood Hardy, Hubert von Herkomer, Henry J. Hudson, Louise Jopling, T. B. Kennington, W. Llewellyn, W. M. Loudan, Arthur Melville, Anna Lea Merritt, F. M. Skipworth, Mrs Annie Swynnerton, W. R. Symonds, Mary Waller, Edwin A. Ward, Leslie Ward (better known as "Spy"), and T. Blake Wirgman.

Other early members included Sir John Everett Millais, George Frederick Watts, John Singer Sargent, Augustus John and James McNeill Whistler. Women were eligible for membership from the start.

At the Coronation Exhibition of 1911, which marked its 20th anniversary, it was announced that King George V had conferred on the society the status of a Royal Society, and it has been known as the Royal Society of Portrait Painters since then.

The Times said on 22 April 2006:

Of the country's two major annual portrait exhibitions, the one at the National Portrait Gallery in June might be better known, but the one at the Royal Society is surely the more glittering, as it is to the society that many of the country's powerful institutions go to commission portraits of their leaders.

== Activities ==
=== Portrait Commissions Service ===
To encourage the genre of portrait painting, they offer a portrait commissions service.

=== Annual Exhibition ===
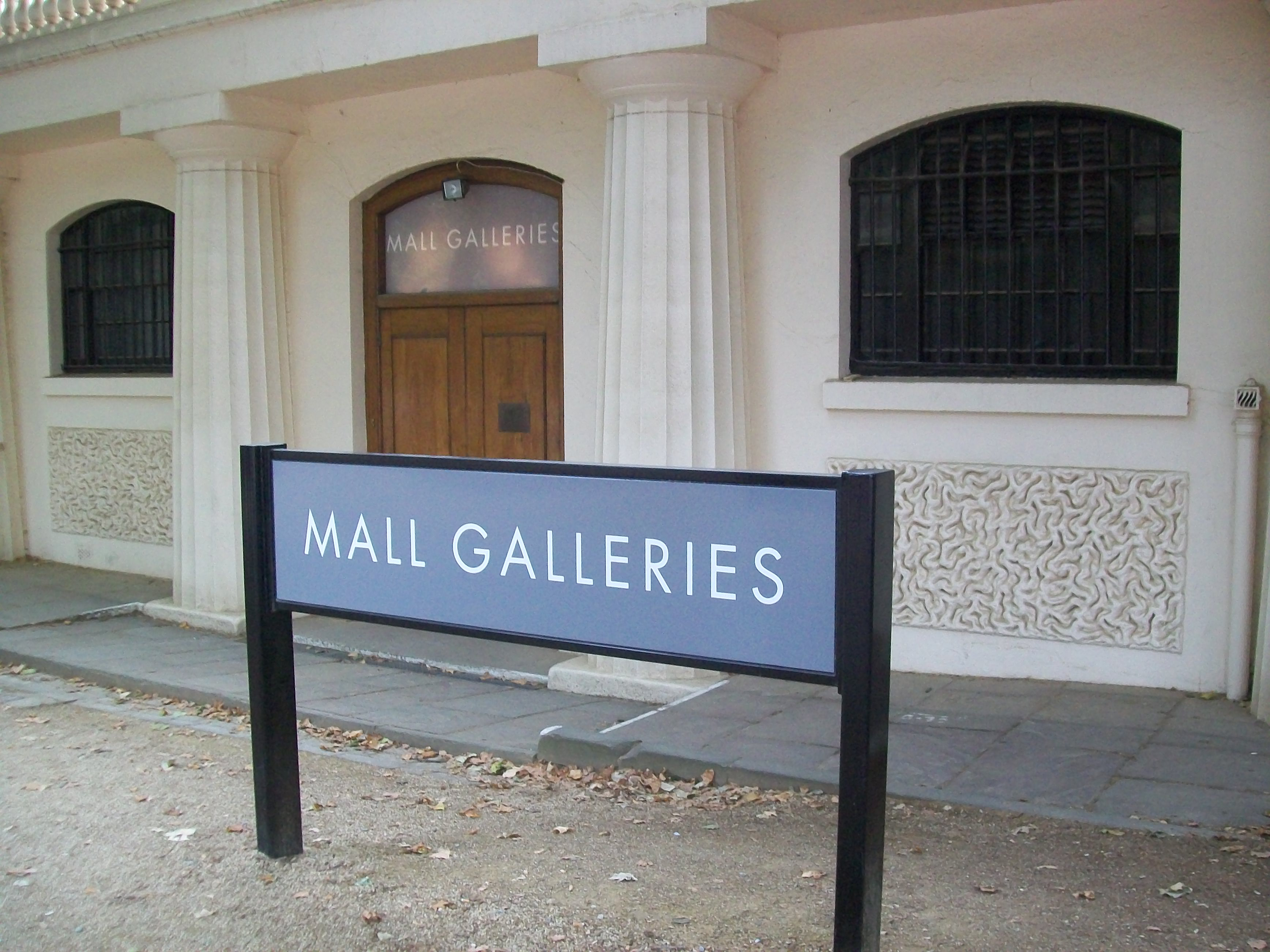
Entrance to Mall Galleries

The Society holds an Annual Exhibition, which takes place every year at the Mall Galleries, The Mall, by Trafalgar Square, London.

A major showcase for some 200 recent portraits it is the largest contemporary portrait exhibition in the UK. It is formed by a cohort of work by distinguished members alongside works by non-member artists who have successfully competed to be included in the show. Unlike other shows, the works are entirely selected by portrait painters. The exhibition aims to include the best of a wide variety of styles in painted and drawn media.

==== Prizes and awards ====
Many prizes are awarded via the Annual Exhibition. These include The William Lock Portrait Prize worth £20,000, the Ondaatje Prize for Portraiture, the Prince of Wales Award for Portrait Drawing, the Burke's Peerage Foundation Prize and the de Laszlo Foundation Prize, and the Smallwood Architects Prize.

=== Learning ===
The Society also holds portrait demonstrations, workshops, talks and tours.

== Collections ==
=== The People's Portrait Collection ===
The People's Portraits Collection owned by the society was founded in 2000 as a millennial exhibition. The idea was to represent ordinary people from all walks of life, and thereby offer a picture of the United Kingdom as it moved from the 20th century into the 21st. Each portrait is donated by a Member and Members continue to add to this collection.

The Collection has been housed at Girton College (one of the 31 constituent colleges of the University of Cambridge) since 2002 as a long-term loan, and is open to the public every day.

== Membership ==
=== Members ===
- Alastair Adams PPRP (Hon Archivist, Treasurer)
- Frances Bell RP
- Jane Bond RP NEAC
- Jason Bowyer RP PPNEAC
- Paul Brason RP
- Keith Breeden RP
- Peter Brown RP NEAC PS ROI Hon. RBA
- George Bruce (Past President)
- David Caldwell RP
- Tom Coates RP PPNEAC PPPS RWS
- David Cobley RP NEAC RWA
- Anthony Connolly RP (President)
- Frank Cadogan Cowper RA RP RWS
- Saied Dai RP NEAC
- Sam Dalby RP
- Simon Davis VPRP RBSA (Hon Secretary)
- Frederick Deane RP
- Andrew Festing PPRP MBE
- Richard Foster PRP (Past President)
- David Graham RP
- Valeriy Gridnev RP PS ROI
- Herbert James Gunn RA RP (Past President)
- Robin-Lee Hall (Past President)
- James Hague RP
- Geoffrey Hayzer RP
- Emma Hopkins RP
- Sheldon Hutchinson RP
- Andrew James RP
- Brendan Kelly RP
- Peter Kuhfeld RP NEAC
- June Mendoza AO OBE RP ROI Hon. SWA
- Anthony Morris RP NEAC
- Tom Phillips RA Hon. RP
- Anastasia Pollard RP
- David Poole PPRP ARCA
- Mark Roscoe RP
- Susan Ryder RP NEAC
- Tai-Shan Schierenberg Hon. RP
- Melissa Scott-Miller RP NEAC
- Stephen Shankland RP
- Jeff Stultiens RP
- Benjamin Sullivan RP NEAC
- Jason Sullivan RP
- Michael Taylor RP
- Daphne Todd OBE PPRP NEAC
- Jason Walker RP
- John Walton RP
- Emma Wesley RP
- Toby Wiggins RP
- Antony Williams RP PS NEAC
- John Wonnacott Hon. RP CBE
- Neale Worley RP NEAC
- Robbie Wraith RP
- Martin Yeoman RP NEAC
