= Contemporary Lynx =

Art magazine

Contemporary Lynx Magazine
- Editor: Sylwia Krason
- Categories: Art, Design, Photography, Collecting
- Frequency: Biannual
- Publisher: Contemporary Lynx Ltd.
- Founder: Sylwia Krason and Dobromila Blaszczyk
- Founded: 2013
- First issue: 2015
- Country: United Kingdom
- Based in: London
- Language: English
- Website: www.contemporarylynx.co.uk
- ISSN: 2058-7465

Contemporary Lynx Magazine is an international art magazine founded in 2013. It focuses on the art industry and visual culture of Central and Eastern Europe through essays, interviews and specially commissioned artworks. It appeared twice a year in print (2015–2023) and digital versions (ongoing) . It collaborated with the Polish e-commerce platform Allegro on the Allegro Prize, an international competition for emerging visual artists between 2020–2022.
