= Benjamin Sullivan (artist) =

English artist

- Born: 10 May 1977 (age 49); Grimsby, North East Lincolnshire, England
- Education: Edinburgh College of Art
- Known for: Painting

Benjamin Sullivan (born 1977 in Grimsby) is an English artist best known for portraiture. He lives and works in Suffolk.

== Life and work ==
Benjamin Sullivan studied painting and drawing at Edinburgh College of Art, graduating in 2000. He was elected a member of the New English Art Club and the Royal Society of Portrait Painters in 2001 and 2003 respectively, becoming the youngest person to be elected to those institutions.

In 2007 he won the Lynn Painter-Stainers Prize. His work is to be found in numerous public and private collections, including the National Portrait Gallery, London.

In 2009 he became artist in residence at All Souls College, Oxford, where he undertook a large commission depicting College staff. The resulting work, The All Souls Triptych, was displayed at the Ashmolean Museum in 2012 and now sits in one of Nicholas Hawksmoor's twin towers at All Souls College. In 2014 Sullivan was appointed artist in residence at the Reform Club. .

In 2017, Sullivan won first place in the BP Portrait awards for "Breech!", a portrait of his wife breast-feeding their infant daughter.
