= Daniel Greene (artist) =

American artist (1934–2020)

Daniel E. Greene PSA, NA, AWS (February 26, 1934 – April 5, 2020) was an American artist who worked in the media of pastels and oil painting. The Encyclopædia Britannica considered Mr. Greene the foremost pastelist in the United States. His paintings and pastels are in over 700 public and private collections in the United States and abroad. Highly regarded as a portrait artist, his subjects have included leaders of Government, Banking, Education and Industry. Some of his sitters include First Lady Eleanor Roosevelt, Ayn Rand, Astronaut Walter Schirra, William Randolph Hearst, “Wendy’s” founder Dave Thomas, Commentator Rush Limbaugh, Composer Alan Menken, Bryant Gumbel and Bob Schieffer of CBS TV. Governmental Portraits include Secretary of Agriculture Ann Veneman, Governor Paul Laxalt of Nevada, Governor Gerald Baliles of Virginia, Governor Benjamin Cayetano of Hawaii, and Governor Fob James of Alabama. Business sitters include the chairmen of the boards of Honeywell, Coca-Cola Company, Dupont Corporation, Endo Pharmaceuticals, American Express, The New York Stock Exchange and IBM. Mr. Greene has also painted the Deans, Presidents and Benefactors of Hobart & William Smith Colleges, Tufts, Duke, Columbia, North Carolina, West Point, Delaware, Penn State, New York, Princeton, Rutgers, Yale and Harvard Universities.

On May 26, 1994, in a special White House ceremony, Mr. Greene presented to First Lady Hillary Clinton a pastel portrait of Eleanor Roosevelt. In 2011, The Butler Institute of American Art acquired Mr. Greene’s pastel diptych “Man Flying Kite”.

== Biography ==
Daniel Greene was born in 1934 in Cincinnati, Ohio, and died on April 5, 2020, in North Salem, New York. He was 86 years old. He studied at the Art Academy of Cincinnati 1944-46, and the Art Students League of New York 1953-55. He is the author of the book “Pastel” that was in print for 25 years and “The Art of Pastel”, which were published in English, French, Spanish, Italian and Chinese. He also has produced six instructional videos in the subjects of portrait drawing, color method, pastel and oil painting.

Greene lived and worked in New York State. His popular workshops were held each summer in his studio in North Salem, NY. He was married to Wende Caporale, who is also a portrait artist and illustrator and works in pastel and oil painting. In the past, he worked as an instructor of painting at the National Academy of Design and the Art Students League of New York. Greene has taught over 10,000 students in the United States and abroad, including the painter Hita von Mende.

== Career ==
=== Museum and other collections ===
Among other places, his work can be found at the Smithsonian; the Metropolitan Museum of Art, New York, NY; the Cincinnati Museum of Fine Arts, Cincinnati, Ohio; Columbus Museum of Art, Columbus, Georgia; Butler Institute of American Art, Youngstown, Ohio and the House of Representatives, Washington, DC.

== Bibliography ==
- Pastel - A Comprehensive Guide to Pastel Painting (1985)
