= Federation of British Artists =

Group of British art societies

Coordinates: 51°30′23.55″N 0°7′47.89″W

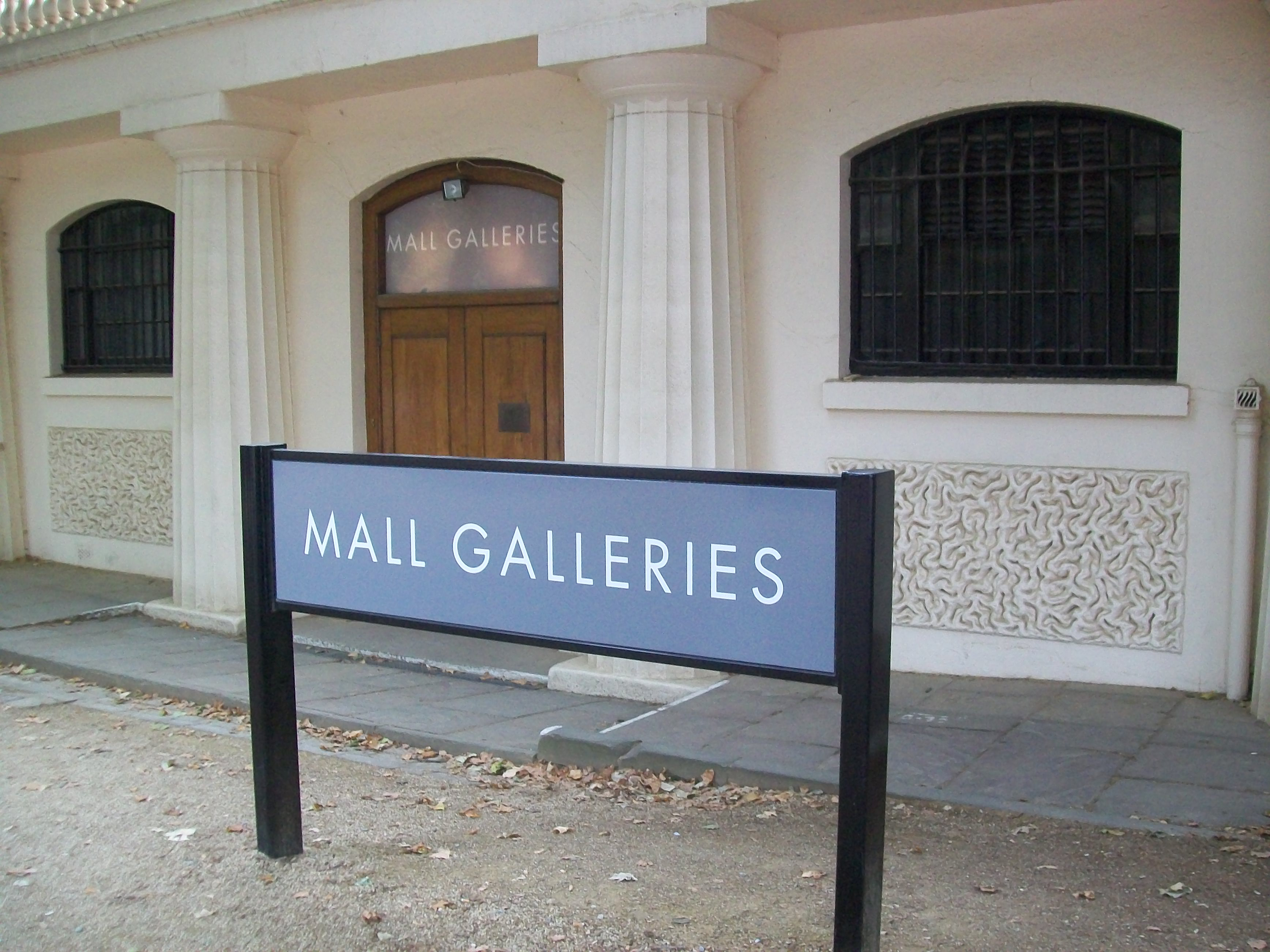
The Mall Galleries building

The Federation of British Artists (FBA) consists of nine art societies, and is based at Mall Galleries in London where the societies' Annual Exhibitions are held. The societies represent living artists working in the United Kingdom who create contemporary figurative art. Mall Galleries aim to 'promote, inspire and educate audiences about the visual arts.'

Although a variety of training events, talks and meetings are held, and public representations and lobbying may occur, the focus of all the societies except the Hesketh Hubbard Art Society (which concentrates on offering life classes) is selling exhibitions, held at least once a year.

== Description ==
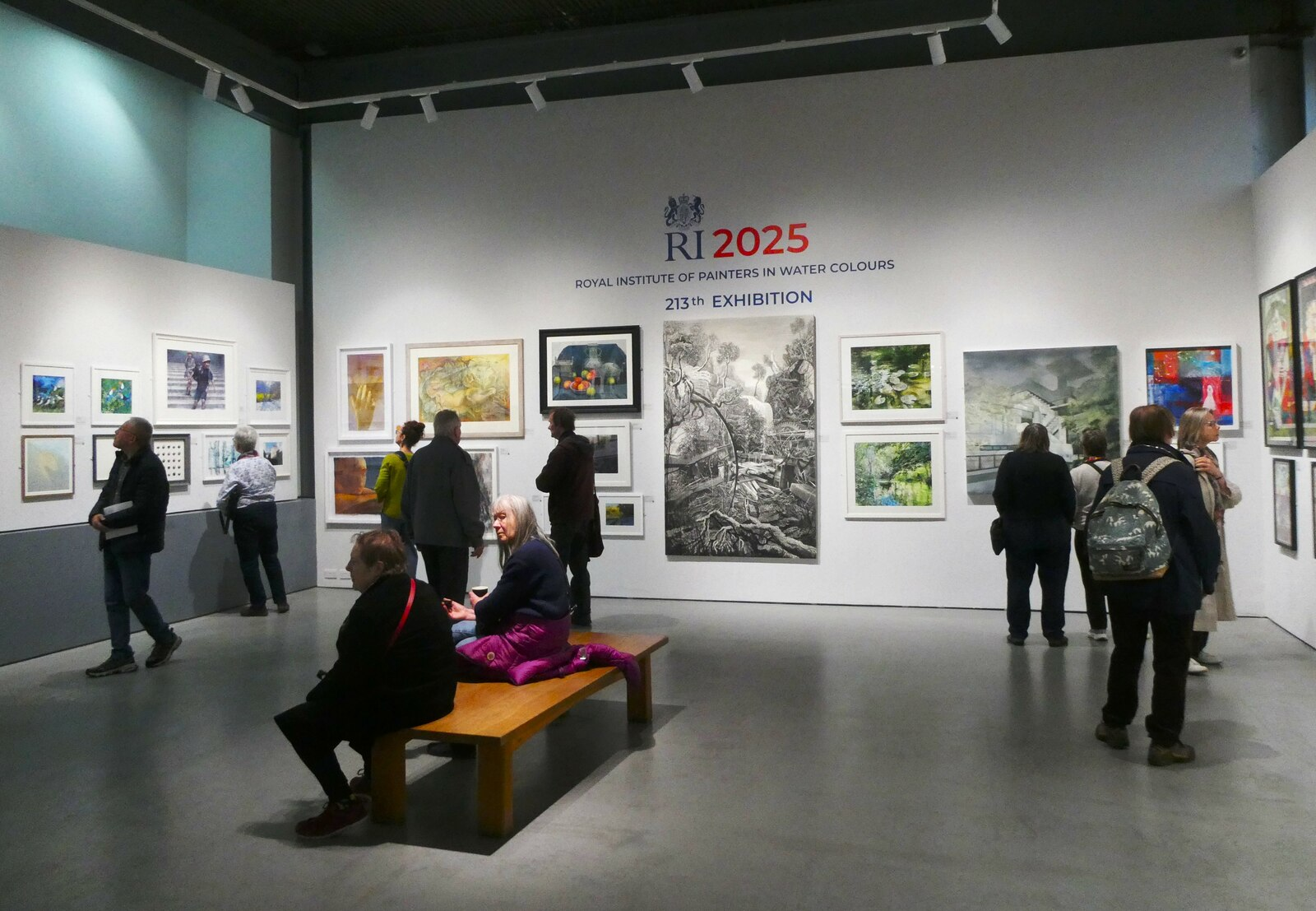
Mall Galleries Royal Institute of Painters in Water Colours exhibition, 2025

The FBA has over 500 artist-members, who regularly exhibit their work and also accept open submissions from the public. In addition to the member societies, other societies and individual artists also stage shows at Mall Galleries. Over 100 prizes and awards are administered each year by the societies.

The gallery also has a commissions department and Friends organisation. The galleries' education department runs a Schools Programme, which includes gallery based workshops for Primary and Secondary school students.

Gallery projects include a drawing school and summer courses run by the New English Art Club, as well as The Hesketh Hubbard Art Society, the largest life drawing society in London, who meet to draw from life models.

The FBA is a registered charity, number 200048, and was established in 1961.

In February 2011 the Mall Galleries mounted an exhibition, "Pure Gold: 50 Years of the Federation of British Artists", curated by Anthony J Lester, Hon.RMS, FRBA, FRSA. An illustrated, 100-page catalogue (ISBN 978-0-9560219-3-9) was published to accompany the show.

Mall Galleries received public attention when they removed oil painting Portrait of Ms Ruby May, Standing. According to the artist, Leena McCall, the painting was deemed "disgusting" and "pornographic".

== Societies in the FBA ==
- Royal Institute of Painters in Water Colours
- Royal Society of British Artists
- Royal Society of Marine Artists
- Royal Society of Portrait Painters
- Royal Institute of Oil Painters
- New English Art Club
- The Pastel Society
- Society of Wildlife Artists
- Hesketh Hubbard Art Society

== Other exhibiting societies ==
Societies that have exhibited at Mall Galleries include:

- Armed Forces Art Society
- East Anglian Group of Marine Artists
- Free Painters and Sculptors
- The Guild of Aviation Artists
- The Royal Society of Miniature Painters, Sculptors and Gravers
- Society of Equestrian Artists
- The Society of Women Artists
- The Society for Art of Imagination
- The Wapping Group of Artists

== Prizes ==
Prizes which are awarded at Mall Galleries include:

- The Columbia Threadneedle Prize for painting and sculpture
- The Sunday Times Water Colour competition
- ING Discerning Eye

== See also ==
- Ken Howard
- William Bowyer
- Charles Williams
