= Helen Lessore =

English painter (1907–1994)

Helen Lessore OBE
- Born: Helen Brook; 31 October 1907; London, England
- Died: 6 May 1994 (aged 86); London, England
- Education: Slade School of Fine Art
- Known for: Painter
- Notable work: Gallerist
- Awards: Order of the British Empire

Helen Lessore, Symposium I, 1974–1977, oil on canvas, Tate

Helen Lessore OBE (31 October 1907 – 6 May 1994) was a British gallerist and the director of the Beaux Arts Gallery in London, England. She was also a painter.

== Early life ==
She was born Helen Brook on 31 October 1907 in London, England. Her father, Abraham Brook (c.1876–1944), had come to London from Lithuania. Her mother, Edith Berliner (1881–1935), was English, from a Frankfurt family of Spanish descent.

Brook studied at the Slade School of Fine Art from 1924 to 1928.

She married the sculptor and gallerist Frederick Lessore in 1934. They had two sons, Henry Lessore, a writer, born 1937, and John Lessore, an artist, born 1939.

== Career ==
=== Beaux Arts Gallery ===
In 1931, she began to work as a secretary at the Beaux Arts Gallery, which was founded by the sculptor Frederick Lessore, on Bruton Place in London. Increasingly involved in the running of the gallery and the management of artists, she published the first of many articles on the painter Walter Sickert in 1932. In the years following World War II, the Beaux Arts Gallery became noted for championing figurative painting.

When Frederick died in 1951, Helen took over full directorship of the gallery. Under her leadership, the Beaux Arts Gallery became specifically known for exhibiting artists from the Kitchen Sink School. In particular, four artists from the Kitchen Sink School became known as the Beaux Arts Quartet: John Bratby, Derrick Greaves, Jack Smith and Edward Middleditch. It is especially noteworthy that each of these artists was chosen before they achieved widespread recognition at the 1956 Venice Biennial.

Lessore was also key in championing young, unknown artists. For instance, Francis Bacon had a solo exhibition at the Beaux Arts Gallery in 1953. Frank Auerbach and Leon Kossoff held their first solo exhibitions at the gallery in 1956 and 1957, respectively.

Lessore ran the gallery until its closure in 1965. The gallery's final exhibition was a show of her son’s work, the artist John Lessore.

=== Artist ===
A full retrospective of Lessore's paintings was exhibited at the Fine Art Society in London in 1987. Her paintings can be found in public collections around Great Britain, including the Tate Britain. and the Royal Academy of Arts.

== Recognition ==
In the 1958 Birthday Honours, Lessore was appointed an Officer of the Order of the British Empire (OBE) for her services to the arts.
