= Beaux Arts Gallery =

Coordinates: 51.5110°N 0.1439°W

Beaux Arts Gallery was a gallery at 1 Bruton Place, London, England. It was known as a preeminent center for promoting avant-garde art until its closure in 1965.

Founded and operated by portrait sculptor Frederick Lessore in 1923, the gallery was run by his wife Helen Lessore, a painter, until it closed following her death. Prominent exhibitions at the gallery included the first solo exhibition by Christopher Wood; one of the first exhibitions by Barbara Hepworth and her husband John Skeaping, and the first solo exhibitions by Sheila Fell, Frank Auerbach and Leon Kossoff. Solo exhibitions of Reginald Fairfax Wells sculpture and pottery.

Beaux Arts Gallery also became associated with the Kitchen Sink School (and later the School of London) and its prominent members; John Bratby, Derrick Greaves, Edward Middleditch and Jack Smith.

The Lessore's son, John (born 1939), an artist in his own right, exhibited at the gallery whilst it was open. He has subsequently been appointed a trustee of the National Gallery.
