= Ruth Borchard =

British writer (1910–2000)

- Born: 1910
- Died: 2000 (aged 89–90)
- Occupations: Writer, biographer
- Writing career
- Notable work: John Stuart Mill: the Man

Ruth Borchard (1910–2000) was a British writer who created a collection of self-portraits made by 100 modern British artists, the Ruth Borchard Collection.

A notable work of Borchard's was John Stuart Mill: the Man.

== Early and personal life ==
Borchard was a cousin of the mother of Deborah Layton, survivor and author of Seductive Poison: A Jonestown Survivor's Story of Life and Death in the Peoples Temple.

== Career ==
She assisted Friedrich Hayek on John Stuart Mill and Harriet Taylor and later wrote John Stuart Mill: the Man, published in 1957, which was considered by R.J. Halliday to be "an amusing and perceptive account of Mill's life and personality." She wrote of his romantic interest, Harriet Taylor, her intellectual influence, and his conversion to Benthamism.

== Borchard Collection ==
Borchard collected 100 self-portraits of British artists. She started out offering 10–15 guineas and then 21 guineas for artists to provide their self-portraits. Jean Cooke responded to the request saying "Dear Miss Borchard, I am not a feminist but to have only three women painters out of 91 makes rather poor odds so 21 gns it is. Are you going to come and pick up the painting?" The commission was half her usual rate. Of the total 100 self-portraits, there were only five women. In response to Borchar's request, Michael Ayrton wrote: "I will accept the 21gns and I much admire anyone who can obtain so many works for no more than that figure."

Borchard began collecting works in 1958 and by 1971 had 100 self-portraits. The British or British-based artists made self-portraits in oil, gouaches, watercolours and one was a bas relief. She wrote that "One of the greatest satisfactions of my collection: about one in three of the self-portraits were done because of my request. They would not exist but for that it makes me feel creative at one remove." The collection was shown at the 2003 British Art Fair at the Commonwealth Institute in London.

She collected works of:

- Michael Ayrton
- Horace Brodzky
- Jean Cooke
- Raymond Coxon
- Alfred Daniels
- Henryk Gotlib
- Brita Granström
- William Hale
- Patrick Hayman
- Lucinda Mackay
- Anne Redpath
- David Tindle
- Euan Uglow
- Keith Vaughan
- Carel Weight

Thomas Newbolt, a 62-year-old artist from Cambridge, won the 2013 Ruth Borchard Self-Portrait Competition Award which included a £10,000 prize. Joanna Brenden, Ruth Borchard's granddaughter presented the award to Newbolt. Celia Paul won first prize in 2011.

== Published works ==
=== Books ===
- Four Dialogues of Plato: Including the "Apology of Socrates". Watts. 1946.
- Donkeys for Rogador. New York: Dial Press. 1967.
- John Stuart Mill: The Man. Watts. 1957.
- Oh My Own Rose: The History and Symbolism of the Rose. The Author. 1986.
- The Ashtray Murderer. Book Guild. 1997. ISBN 978-1-85776-270-9.
- The Children of the Old House. Lutterworth Press. 1961.
- The Jewish Pilgrim. East-West Publications. 1 June 1996. ISBN 978-0-85692-046-2.
- Upright Man A Way to Spontaneous Living Man's Presumptrous Brain. 1967.
- We Are Strangers Here: An 'Enemy Alien' in Prison in 1940. Vallentine Mitchell. 11 March 2008. ISBN 978-0-85303-753-8.
- Your First Baby. Faber & Faber. 1946.

=== Articles ===
- "A way to spontaneous living (about Frederick Matthias Alexander)". The Humanist. June 1963.
