= Out of the Silence =

Out of the Silence may refer to:

- Out of the Silence (Cox novel), a 1919 novel by Erle Cox
- Out of the Silence (James novel), a 2005 novel by Wendy James
- Out of the Silence (album), a 1988 album by Dare

== See also ==
- Out of the Silent Planet (disambiguation)
