= Serge Strosberg =

Belgian artist

Serge Strosberg (born 1966) is a Belgian-American artist known for his oil-on-canvas portraits and cityscapes.

== Early life and education ==
Strosberg was born in Antwerp, Belgium. He studied graphic design at the Académie Julian in Paris and morphology at the École Nationale Supérieure des Beaux-Arts, graduating from the Académie Julian in 1993. Before becoming a full-time painter, he authored the book In the Kingdom of Dragons (1999).

== Art style ==
Strosberg primarily paints oil-on-canvas portraits and cityscapes. His early works were influenced by German Expressionism and the School of London painters. Since moving to New York City in 2008, Strosberg's work has focused on the city's nightlife and fashion models. He has also painted portraits of Palm Beach residents, including a portrait of Henry Flagler.

== Exhibitions and collections ==
In 2001, Strosberg received the Jan Cockx Prize, which was presented by Flor Bex, then-director of M HKA (Museum of Contemporary Art of Antwerp).

His work has been exhibited at venues including the Ann Norton Sculpture Gardens in West Palm Beach (2009), the Palm Beach 3 Contemporary Art Fair (2009), and Art Basel Miami Beach (2008). In 2023, his work was shown at the Cultural Council for Palm Beach County in Lake Worth Beach, FL.
