= Women's Political Association of Victoria =

Women's Political Association
- Women's Political Association of Victoria
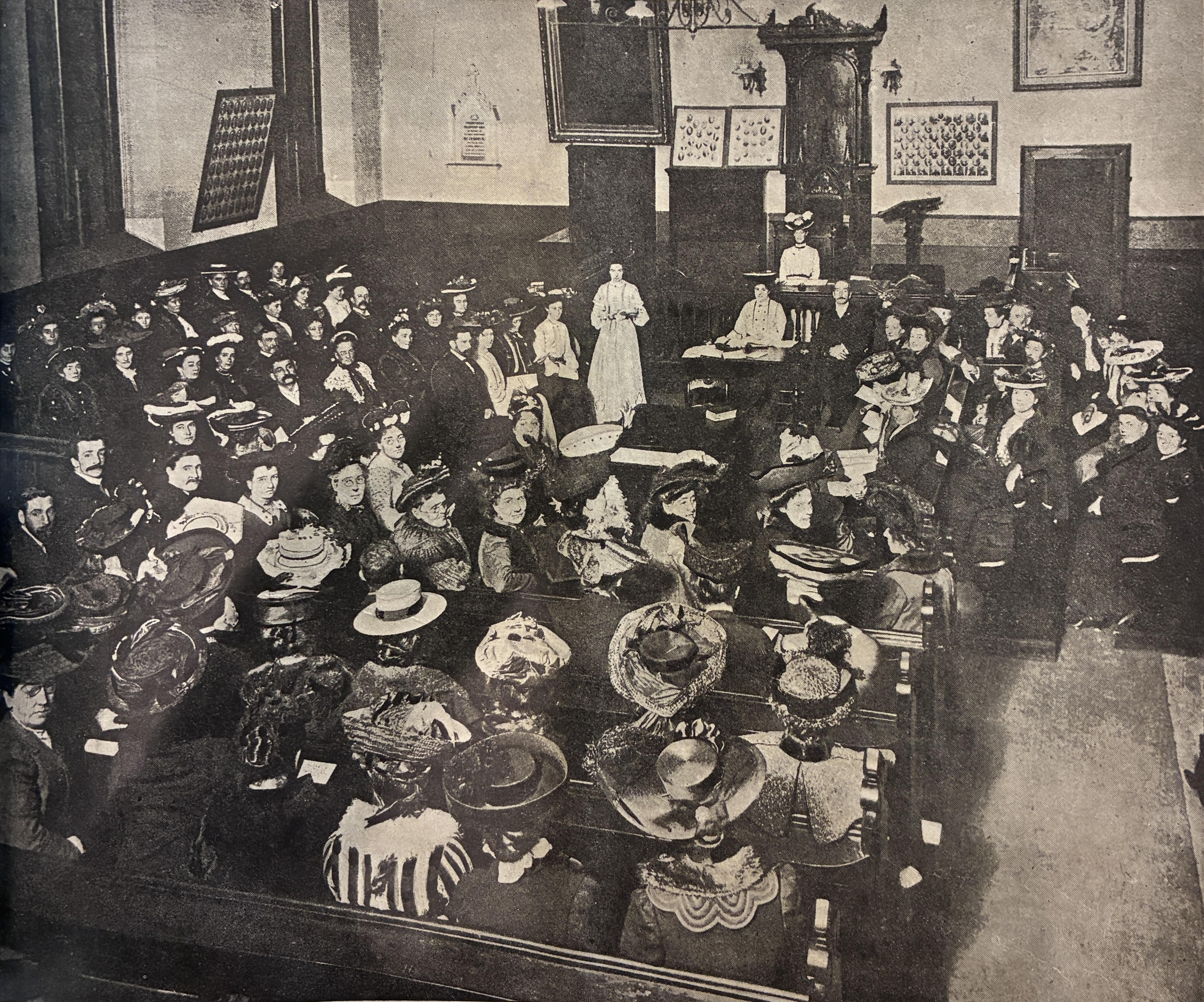
- WPA's women's parliament, 10 June 1904
- Abbreviation: WPA
- Formation: 13 June 1903
- Dissolved: 1919
- Type: Non-Party political organisation
- Purpose: To educate women about politics
- Members: 3000 (August 1903)
- Founder and president: Vida Goldstein
- Main organ: The Woman Voter
- Affiliations: Women's Peace Army
- Formerly called: Women's Federal Political Association

The Women's Political Association of Victoria (WPA), also known as Women's Political Association and Women's Federal Political Association, was founded in State of Victoria, Australia, in 1903 by Vida Goldstein and its purpose was to educate women in political matters. Non-indigenous women had gained the federal vote in and the association initially focussed educating the newly enfranchised women on politics, elections and the running of parliament with meetings, pamphlets, mock elections, and a women's parliament. However it quickly turned to political campaigning for Goldstein's run for Federal Parliament. It supported her through five elections, including three runs for the Senate in 1903, 1910, 1917, and two runs for the lower house seat of Kooyong in 1913 and 1914. In 1904 it joined the fight for women's suffrage in Victoria. And in 1909 it launched its monthly publication the Woman Voter. In 1919 the association was disbanded, and the publication ceased when Goldstein decided to resign.

== Background ==
=== Formation ===
The WPA was a non-party political organisation formed by Vida Goldstein in 1903, and was originally called the Women's Federal Political Association. Goldstein wished to challenge the party system as she felt that women would be forced to compromise women's issues for party politics. There were differing views within the organisation about party politics, Lilian Locke, the first secretary was a devoted member of the Labor party.

It was loosely based on the Melbourne Women's Progressive League, which had recently been renamed Melbourne Women's Political Association. Goldstein wished to educate women on politics in anticipation of the upcoming federal election in December 1903, when the newly enfranchised, non-indigenous women of Australia would be able to vote for the first time.

There was a subcommittee meeting of ten people to draw up the constitution, chaired by Arthur Robinson. After a debate they decided that men and women could be members. On 13 June, another meeting was held, the constitution was accepted and Goldstein was elected president. Annie Lowe and Clara Weekes were elected as two of the four vice-presidents, and Lilian Locke was elected as secretary.

=== Purpose ===
The provisional platform included the following planks:

- Social– Equal marriage and divorce laws, Equal parent rights over children, Federal food adulteration act, Federal old age pensions, liquor traffic in Federal capital to be determined initially by local option poll, and thereafter by triennial polls, reform of liquor traffic in Federal territories.
- Industrial– Equal pay for equal work, Federal factories act, Federal conciliation and arbitration act; Federal patents, copyrights, and inventions act.
- Financial– Federalising railways, Federalising State debts, Federal life assurance department.
- Defence– Citizen soldiery for defence purposes.

However, Goldstein stated the purpose of the organisation was primarily to educate women about politics. She said while she hoped women would vote for liberal principles, the more important imperative was that women would vote in large numbers. Therefore, she hoped women would join the association even if they disagreed with aspects of their platform. She did not expect to double up on the work of other women's organisations such as the National Council of Women of Victoria, and the Victorian Women's Federation as their work was not politically focussed.

By August 1903, there were auxiliary suburban and country branches of the WPA, and it had three thousand members.

== Political education ==
It produced literature and held meetings to educate women about politics. They held mock elections with women acting as candidates and giving speeches, as well as ballot boxes for people to cast votes, complete with returning officers, and scrutineers, so that newly enfranchised women could practice and become familiar with the processes.

From 1904, they began a women's parliament, with a premier and Cabinet Members. They would introduce bills, usually related to improving conditions for women and children, debate them, and vote on them. The first was held in the Assembly Hall on Collins Street in Melbourne with Goldstein as the Speaker, and Mrs C. B Moore as the Premier. Moore moved the second reading of the Liquor Traffic Bill, which would contract and nationalise liquor traffic. After debate the motion was passed 30 to 15.

== Women running for parliament ==
The WPA was divided within a few months of its formation. On 3 August 1903, the WPA's council voted unanimously to request that Goldstein run for parliament. Goldstein knew that this would be a divisive issue within the organisation. A prominent anti-suffrage argument had run on a slippery-slope argument, that if women won the vote, they would then want to run for Parliament next. The Women's Christian Temperance Union of Victoria were concerned that women running for parliament would affect the chances of the women finally gaining the vote in the state of Victoria and stated: "However logical and even desirable this may be, it is not wise to force the matter before the time is ripe." Goldstein told the WPA council that she was flattered by the request, but that it should go to a vote in the wider membership of the association. A meeting was held on 14 August, where a letter from Goldstein was read that stated she would accept the request if the association approve or if they rejected the motion, she never forget the honour. The motion for her to run was accepted 29 to 8.

By nominating for parliament, Goldstein became the first woman to run for a national parliament in the British empire. The media viewed her decision as radical, claiming women's suffrage was granted to women as a small reluctant concession, and now was being used to claim 'the whole animal'. They reminded readers that women said they would not try to run for parliament with one editorial adding:

"it has long been an established judgement that women is in our hours of ease uncertain, coy, and hard to please, and variable as the shade by the light quivering aspen made. Therefore, we need not be at all surprised that she has changed her mind, and determined to exercise the full political power conferred upon her by men in their hours of political ease and light-heartedness."

Prominent suffragists supported her run, such as Henrietta Dugdale, and Rose Scott. Catherine Spence were less positive about her chances of success stating: "I am not at all sure that Vida Goldstein is wise in standing for the Senate. Women do not vote as women for women."

Goldstein's candidature divided the WPA on other grounds. The secretary, Lilian Locke, resigned from the association and with her the Labor women. She was concerned that Goldstein would take votes from the Labor party.

== Election Campaigns ==
The WPA supported campaigns for Goldstein to run as an independent candidate for the Federal Senate for the Victorian electorate in 1903, 1910, and 1917, and for the House of Representatives for the seat of Kooyong in 1913, and 1914.

Election	House	Electorate	Candidate	Outcome	Total votes	Percentage
1903	Senate	Victoria	Vida Goldstein	Unsuccessful	51,497	16.8%
1910	Senate	Victoria	Vida Goldstein	Unsuccessful	53,583	12.0%
1913	House of Representatives	Kooyong, Victoria	Vida Goldstein	Unsuccessful	11,540	38.1%
1914	House of Representatives	Kooyong, Victoria	Vida Goldstein	Unsuccessful	10,264	32.9%
1917	Senate	Victoria	Vida Goldstein	Unsuccessful	7,768	01.2%

== Women's suffrage in Victoria ==
In 1904 Women's suffrage in Victoria still had not gained the vote for the state. Thomas Bent, a known opponent of women's suffrage became the premier of Victoria, and began a campaign of blocking the suffrage movement. Bent and his Liberal and Conservative supporters feared that women would vote for the Victorian Labor Party. He blamed the newly enfranchised Australian women for the Australian Labor Party’s victory in the 1903 Federal Election. In November of 1904, Bent refused to receive a deputation from the United Council for State Suffrage stating he had no time for them.

Goldstein became frustrated with the organisations, and while the WPA was formed primarily to educate women about politics and processes she decided to change its focus to campaign for suffrage. In January 1905, in her suffrage journal, the Woman's Sphere, she declared:

"The Council accomplished nothing last year; there is no evidence that there is likely to be any vitality this year, and I for one am not willing to let this policy of drift continue. The U.C.S.S. having been given every opportunity to lead the suffrage army, has failed. I think, therefore, that the Women's Political Association is now justified in entering the field and assuming control of the suffrage forces throughout Victoria."

The Women's Political Association became an important suffrage organisation within the state's movement from this time, however, rather than becoming the spearhead, it worked in collaboration with the other organisations, including the UCSS which from this time was primarily represented by the president Annie Lowe. Bent actively focused on blocking the lobbying of the movement. He and his government would continue to block suffrage legislation, until 1908.

== The Woman Voter ==
In 1909 the WPA launched the Woman Voter, which was their monthly publication. It cost one penny, and the first issue was August 1909. As well as updating readers on the WPA, it covered the activities of Australian and International women's issues, and reviewed feminist books and plays. It had 800 subscribers by 1911.

== Disbanding ==
Goldstein and Cecilia John represented the WPA, and the Women's Peace Army at the Women's Peace Conference organized by the Women's International League for Peace and Freedom, held in Zurich on 15 May 1919. After the conference, Goldstein decided not to return to Australia immediately. The WPA and her publication the Woman Voter were disbanded. She later wrote "In 1919 I felt I could no longer work in the political field because the people did not seem willing to tread this path" and in her notes a further line that people "preferred party politics and questions of principle were sacrificed" was crossed out.

== Associated people ==
- Doris Blackburn (1889–1970), a political activist and legislator. Blackburn worked with the WPA as Goldstein's campaign manager in 1913.
- Adela Pankhurst (1885–1961) British suffragette, and political activist. After arriving in Australia in 1914, Pankhurst worked for the WPA as an organiser, and speaker.
- Angela Elizabeth Booth (1869–1954) Eugenicist. Booth joined the WPA and gave speeches on the importance of women's involvement in politics.
- Bella Guerin (1858–1923) Feminist, political activist, and teacher. Guerin was vice-president of the WPA from 1912 to 1914.
- Sarah Jane Baines (1866–1951) British Suffragette who escaped England with her family due to her activist activities. After arriving in Australia she began working with the WPA, assisting with Goldstein's election campaign, in January 1914
- May Brodney (1894–1973) A labor activist. Brodney joined the WPA, and in 1914 with other members, founded the Women's Industrial and Social Union.
