= Horace Brodzky =

Australian-born American-British artist and writer

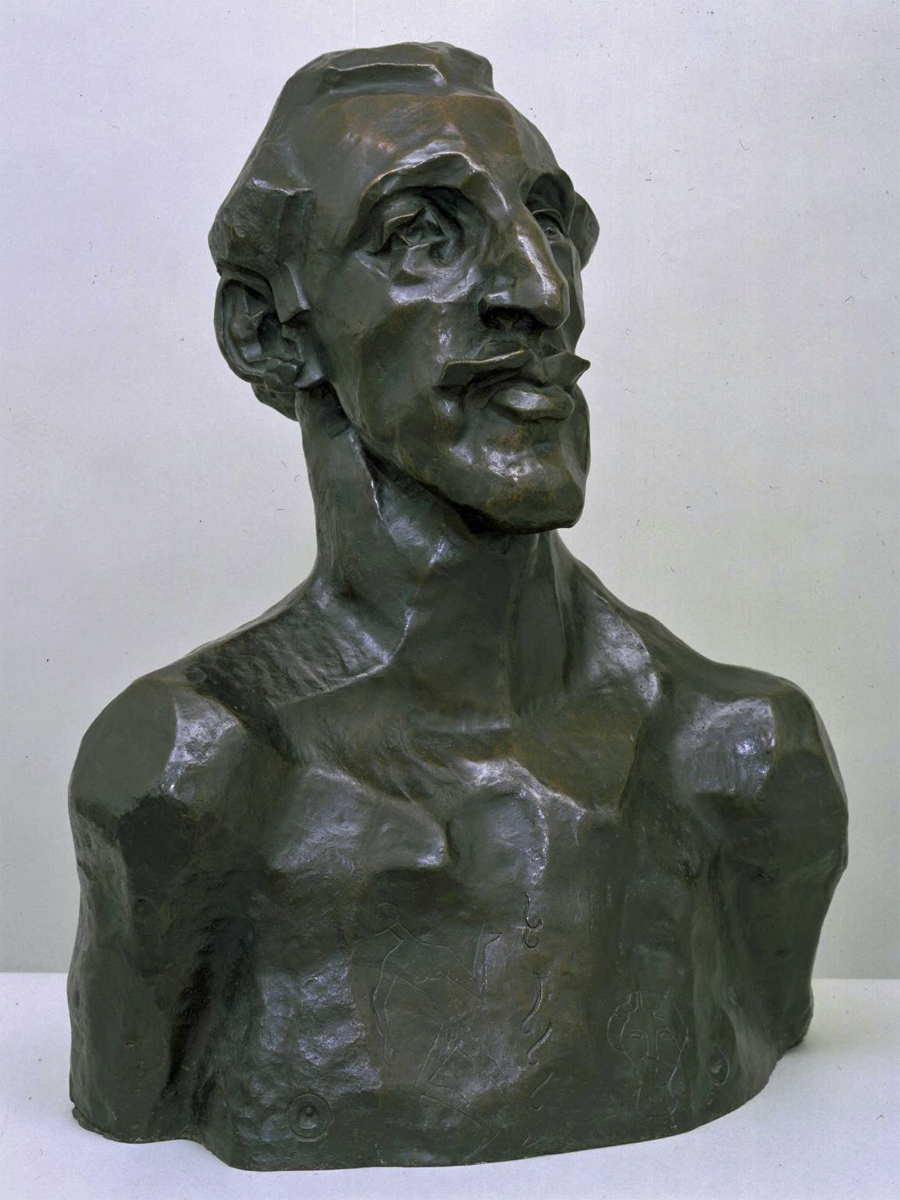
Portrait bust of Horace Brodzky by Henri Gaudier-Brzeska, 1913 (Tate Gallery)

Horace Ascher Brodzky (30 January 1885 – 11 February 1969) was an Australian-born artist and writer most of whose work was created in London and New York. His work included paintings, drawings and linocuts, of which he was an early pioneer. An associate in his early career of many leading artists working in the Britain of his period, including Henri Gaudier-Brzeska, Mark Gertler, and members of the Vorticism movement, he ended his life relatively neglected.

== Early life ==
Brodzky was born in 1885, in Kew, Melbourne, to the Australian journalist Maurice Brodzky, a Jewish immigrant to Australia from Poland, and his wife Flora, née Leon. His brother was Alfred Tennyson Brodney who married the activist May Brodney. In his youth he assisted with the production of his father's magazine, Table Talk.

Brodzky studied initially at the National Gallery School in Melbourne. In 1904, his father was bankrupted after losing a libel case arising from an attempt to expose alleged corruption, and Horace moved with his family to San Francisco.

== London ==
In 1908, Brodzky went to London where he studied during 1911 at the City and Guilds South London Technical Art School. He became an acquaintance and follower of Walter Sickert. Amongst his friends was Henri Gaudier-Brzeska, who created in 1913 a portrait bust of Brodzky (now in the Tate Gallery, London), and whose biography he wrote in 1933. Brodzky is said to have been so engrossed in talk when he visited Gaudier-Brzeska's studio in the King's Road, that he missed the last bus to Herne Hill where he lived.

Brodzky travelled to Italy with the poet John Gould Fletcher, which led to his first London exhibition, "Paintings and Sketches of Italian and Sicilian Scenes" (c. 1911), of which one painting was selected for the 1912 Venice Biennale., so becoming the first Australian to be exhibited at the Biennale. In 1914, his work was exhibited along with that of other Jewish artists, including Mark Gertler and David Bomberg, in the Whitechapel Gallery. Brodzky became a member of The London Group. During that period he was a pioneer of the technique of linocut, in which medium he has been said to have "excelled". His early oils reveal the influence of both Gertler and Bomberg. Among his works of the period are portraits of Jacob Epstein and Jacob Kramer.

== New York ==
In 1915, Brodzky moved to New York, with an introduction to the art patron John Quinn. There he worked as a poster artist and an arts journalist, and, in 1917, helped Quinn organize a New York exhibition of Vorticist artists. In 1919, he married Bertha Greenfield, with whom he was to have three sons. In 1920, Egmont Arens published a collection of 21 of Brodzky's linoprints in New York. Brodzky also designed book jackets for writers including Eugene O'Neill and Theodore Dreiser, and painted a portrait of O'Neill.

== Back to England ==
Returning to London in 1923, he became a professional artist. His work featured in the first-ever exhibition of linocuts, organized by Claude Flight at the Redfern Gallery in 1929. However, his initial success withered in the 1930s, during which time his marriage broke up, and from then on he lived in financial straits. In 1935, James Laver published a study Forty Drawings by Horace Brodzky. Laver described Brodzky's drawing technique as follows:

Brodzky prefers the ordinary 'dip-in' steel nib, for this enables the hand, by varying its pressure on the paper, to broaden the line at will, or rather in obedience to the obscure subconscious or half-conscious promptings which guide the hand to its task. He makes no preliminary studies, draws no pencil outline, carefully rubbed out afterwards to give a false impression of spontaneity. There are no erasures or alterations. Each drawing is made 'au premier coup'. It is made very quickly, as a unity, and when finished the artist cannot remember at what point it was started. The drawing has been thrown on the paper, as it were, with a single gesture.

In 1946, Brodzky published his own study of the French-Romanian-Jewish artist Jules Pascin. He lived for most of the rest of his life in the Kilburn and Willesden areas, continuing to produce paintings, drawings and linocuts. He supported himself by teaching and painting stage decor and, from 1948 to 1962, he was art-editor of the Antique Dealer and Collector's Guide, founded by his brother Vivian.

== Final years ==
In 1963, Brodzky wrote to the collector Ruth Borchard, who had just purchased from him a self-portrait for the sum of 12 guineas (£12.60):

Since 1911 I have been connected with the London art world & have exhibited at all important exhibitions…and have worked for modern art... For a long time I have sold none of my work & have had to rely on selling items by other artists that I have collected ... This letter is not an angry complaint but just the plain facts that I thought you might like to know.

In 1965, 80th anniversary exhibitions were organised for Brodzky at the Ben Uri Gallery and the Oxford Union Cellars. In 1967, some of his early linocuts were reissued in London in a signed edition of 60 prints. Brodzky died in Kilburn in 1969, and his estate was valued for probate at £7977. Exhibitions of Brodzky's work were held in the Jewish Museum of Australia (1988) and at the Boundary Gallery, London (1989).
