= Angela Elizabeth Booth =

Australian eugenicist (1869–1954)

- Born: Elizabeth Plover; 27 October 1869; Liverpool, England
- Died: 5 September 1954 (aged 84); Sandringham, Victoria
- Occupations: Councillor; Politician; Justice of the peace
- Organization: Racial Hygiene Association of New South Wales
- Known for: Promoting eugenics, and founding the Eugenics Society of Victoria
- Movement: Eugenics

Angela Elizabeth Josephine Booth (born Elizabeth Plover, 27 October 1869 – 5 September 1954) was an English-born Australian eugenicist, politician, and social activist. She was a founder and vice president of the Eugenics Society of Victoria. She was involved with the Racial Hygiene Association of New South Wales and advocated for the sterilisation of the "mentally unfit". From 1926 to 1933 she was a councillor for Doncaster & Templestowe's Warrandyte riding. She was appointed a justice of the peace in 1927.

== Early life in England ==
Elizabeth Plover was born on 27 October 1869 in Liverpool, England, to Eliza (née Hall) and Thomas Plover. She styled herself Angela Elizabeth Josephine and migrated to Australia in 1896.

== Politics and social activism in Australia ==
She married the medical practitioner James Booth in Sydney in 1897. In 1901, they moved to Broken Hill where she joined the Liberal Education Society and the Women's Political Association. They moved to North Melbourne sometime prior to 1914. Booth left the Women's Political Association in 1915 because she opposed their pacifist response to World War I.

Booth was a eugenicist and she supported the elimination of prostitution and sexually transmitted infections. She also opposed the distribution of condoms to soldiers. She founded the Association to Combat the Social Evil and spoke about prostitution in a speech at a Workers' Educational Association conference in Sydney.

Booth was a member of the Women's Citizen Movement and the Australian Women's National League. From 1926 until 1933 she was a councillor for Doncaster & Templestowe's Warrandyte riding. Her husband was president of the Australian Literature Society. She was appointed justice of the peace in 1927. She made an unsuccessful bid for Brighton's seat in the Legislative Assembly in 1929.

== Support for eugenics ==
The Great Depression eroded Booth's belief in liberal reform. She came to believe that crime and unemployment were caused by the proliferation of so-called "mental defectives". Since the late 1920s, she and her husband supported legislation that would provide for the "sterilisation of the unfit". They met people who shared their beliefs through the Racial Hygiene Association of New South Wales and helped to found the Eugenics Society of Victoria in 1936. She served as vice president of the organisation and alongside president Wilfred Eade Agar, she advocated for sterilisation. Her 1938 lecture "Voluntary Sterilization for Human Betterment" was published by the society.

== Later life and death ==
After the death of her husband in 1944, Booth's involvement in social activism diminished. She moved to Melbourne in 1950 and died on 5 September 1954 in Sandringham, Victoria.
