= Self-Portrait (book) =

2019 book by Celia Paul

- Author: Celia Paul
- Language: English
- Publisher: Jonathan Cape
- Publication date: November 7, 2019
- Pages: 224
- ISBN: 978-1-78733-184-6

Self-Portrait is a 2019 memoir by artist Celia Paul. It includes multiple color reproductions of her paintings. It devotes substantial space to her relationship with Lucian Freud.
