= Jake Auerbach =

British film maker (born 1958)

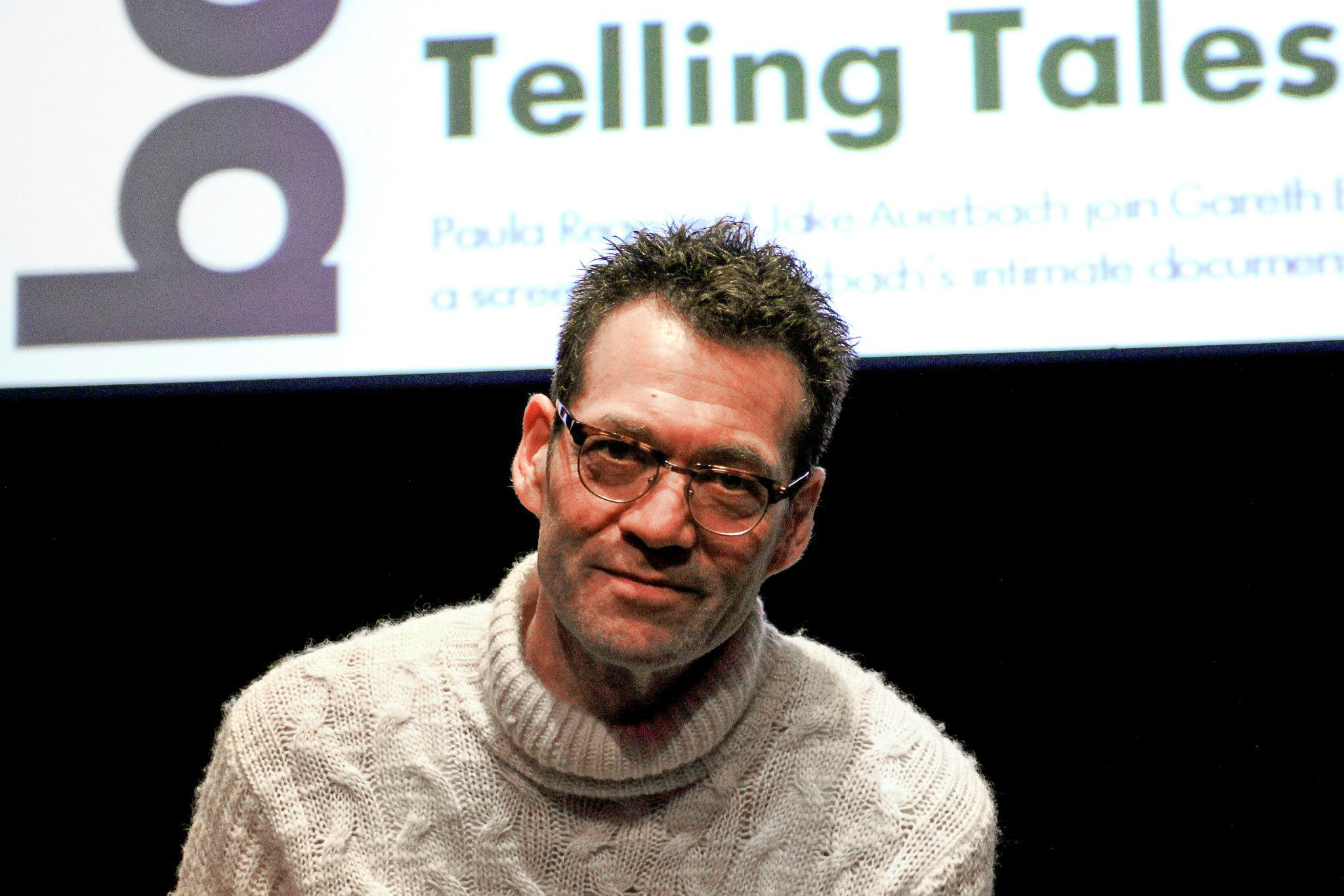

Jake Auerbach (born 1958) is a British film maker specialising in documentary subjects. Though his films have ranged across the cultural spectrum he is best known for his portraits of artists both contemporary and historical.

== Career ==
Jake Auerbach was born in Sheffield, Yorkshire to Frank Auerbach and Julia Wolstenholme. He was educated at King Alfred School in North London (1963–76) and then joined the Economist newspaper, in the distribution department. After two years, he left to join the Henson Organisation, working on The Muppet Show and The Dark Crystal.

Auerbach then worked on the TV film Haunted, in the USA before returning to the UK and the editing department of the BBC. After a year in the cutting rooms working on strands such as Arena, Omnibus and Horizon, he began to direct items on the arts magazine programme Review. There followed films on rock music, photography, Voodoo, football and major documentaries about London, the art market and filmed portraits of artists. In 1992, he left the BBC to become an independent Producer/Director. Auerbach now runs his own company, Jake Auerbach Films Ltd.

The Metropolitan Museum of Art, The Tate Gallery, The Royal Academy and the National Gallery have presented Auerbach’s films and seasons of his work have been shown at Abbot Hall, Kendal (Cumbria), Pallant House, Chichester (West Sussex) and most notably The National Portrait Gallery in London.

"I tell people that I don't make art films, I make people films... portraits rather than profiles" says Auerbach. "It's really satisfying then to have these films screened at the National Portrait Gallery, it feels right."

== Films ==
20 Sites n Years (44) Prod/Director Jake Auerbach Films 2016
Each spring artist Tom Phillips walks a nine-mile circle taking photographs in 20 specific places. These photographs are taken from the same spot in the same direction with the same framing. The project was begun in 1973 and the photographs when seen together reveal the quirky and sometimes inexplicable effect of human beings on their surroundings. The result is an eternal, evolving portrait of Phillips’ neighbourhood in South London.

FRANK (56) Prod/Director Jake Auerbach Films 2015 (also known as Frank by Jake)
Frank Auerbach rarely leaves his small corner of North London. When an exhibition of his work opened in the Kunstmuseum Bonn before travelling to Tate Britain, film maker Jake Auerbach decided to go and film the show so that his father could see how it looked… they set up a projector and filmed his responses to seeing the work after a break of anything up to 60 years. The result is a film that unfolds an obsessive painter’s personal manifesto (citing references as diverse as Morecambe & Wise, Gauguin and Shakespeare) which is woven into the relationship between father and son.

The Last Art Film (95) Prod/Director JAFilms 2012
Contemporary artists Michael Landy, Tracey Emin, Gary Hume, Grayson Perry, Celia Paul, Jake Tilson, Michael Craig-Martin, Allen Jones, Tom Phillips, Paula Rego, Frank Auerbach, Joe Tilson and scores more from the last 2000 years voiced by Jim Broadbent, Ian Holm, Lizzy McInnerny and Tim McInnerny discuss the real business of making art.

Paula Rego: telling tales (50) Prod/Director JAFilms 2009
An intimate portrait of the artist Paula Rego.

Allen Jones: Women and Men (59) Prod/Director JAFilms 2007
A portrait of the artist Allen Jones

Rodin: the sculptors' view (53) Prod/Director JAFilms 2006
Rodin as seen through the eyes of contemporary sculptors Rachel Whiteread, Sir Anthony Caro, Barry Flanagan, Marc Quinn, Tony Cragg, Richard Deacon and Antony Gormley

John Virtue’s London (50) Prod/Director JAFilms 2005
A film about the painter John Virtue

Lucian Freud: Portraits (68) Prod/Director JAFilms/BBC 2004
Lucian Freud as seen through the eyes of those who model for him including David Hockney, the Dowager Duchess of Devonshire and Andrew Parker Bowles

Restoration (14 short films) Prod/Director Endemol/BBC 2003
A series of short films made with Jonathan Foyle

Titian (50) Prod/Director National Gallery 2003
with John Berger

Frank Auerbach... to the studio (53) Producer HRJAFilms/BBC 2002

A Portrait of Majesty (20) Prod/Director BBC 2001

Orange Juice (short drama) Producer Various 2000/1

Private View Project Chairman L Ashley Found. ‘96-9

Patrick Hughes (20) Director Various 1996
A portrait of Britain's leading surrealist artist Patrick Hughes

Kitaj; In the Picture (50) Director HRJAFilms/BBC 1995
A unique interview with the artist R. B. Kitaj.

Sickert’s London (50) Director HRJAFilms/BBC 1994
A film about the forgotten hero of British art Walter Sickert. Voiced by Alan Bennett and with music by Jools Holland.

Missing Pictures series (20s) Director HRJAFilms/BBC 1993

The Nation (60) Prod/Director BBC 1991/2

Nevin: Picture Hunt (40) Director BBC 1991
With footballer Pat Nevin

Phillips: Artists Eye (40) Prod/Director BBC 1990
A portrait of artist Tom Phillips

Rego: Artists Eye (40) Prod/Director BBC 1990
A portrait of Paula Rego.

Sickert in Liverpool (20) Director BBC 1989

Bandes Designee (15) Director BBC 1989

Cindy Palmano (20) Director BBC 1989

Lucian Freud (50) Prod/Director BBC 1988
A unique interview with the painter Lucian Freud.

Jeffrey Bernard (20) Director BBC 1988
Jeffrey Bernard reviews the Ideal Home Exhibition.

Freud (20) Prod/Director BBC 1988

Frank Zappa (20) Director BBC 1988
An interview with Frank Zappa

History Painting (20 minutes) Director BBC 1987

== Sources ==
- http://www.imdb.com/name/nm1589649/ Internet Movie Database page
- https://web.archive.org/web/20110717001837/http://www.moviemail-online.co.uk/directors/3023/Jake-Auerbach/ MovieMail page
- http://shootingpeople.org/cards/Jake Shooting People page
- The Independent Independent review of Paula Rego: telling tales
- https://www.amazon.co.uk/s/?url=search-alias%3Ddvd&field-keywords=jake+auerbach&Go.x=13&Go.y=10&Go=Go Amazon page
- http://www.npg.org.uk/about/press/jake-auerbach.php?searched=jake+auerbach&highlight=searchHighlight+searchHighlight1+searchHighlight2 National Portrait Gallery Season page
- https://web.archive.org/web/20100207033753/http://www.canadianart.ca/microsites/film/2006/ Canadian Art Film Series 2006
- https://web.archive.org/web/20100919002907/http://www.thisislondon.co.uk/lifestyle/article-23728979-inside-paula-regos-madhouse.do Evening Standard review of Paula Rego: telling tales
- http://www.royalacademy.org.uk/ra-magazine/autumn2006/autumn2006features/life-force,21,RAMA.html Royal Academy of Arts Rodin: the sculptors’ view page
- http://www.tomphillips.co.uk/works/portraits/item/5440-brian-eno Tom Phillips page
- http://www.artfifa.com/fr/index.php?option=com_film&task=view&id=689&year=25&Itemid=289&lang=en 25th International Festival of Films on Art Montreal - Rodin page
- https://web.archive.org/web/20110707164521/http://artfifa.com/index.php?option=com_film&task=view&id=2142&Itemid=482 28th International Festival of Films on Art Montreal - Paula Rego: telling tales page
- https://web.archive.org/web/20110707165408/http://www.artfifa.com/index.php?option=com_film&task=view&id=114&year=23&Itemid=402 23rd International Festival of Films on Art Montreal - Lucian Freud: Portraits page
- https://www.spectator.co.uk/search/search.thtml?search=jake+auerbach Spectator Magazine book reviews by Jake Auerbach
- The Independent Auerbach’s Picasso article
- https://www.theguardian.com/media/2004/jun/10/tvandradio.television1 Guardian Freud review
