= John Bratby =

English painter (1928–1992)

- Born: 19 July 1928; Wimbledon, London, England
- Died: 20 July 1992 (aged 64); Hastings, Sussex, England
- Known for: Painting
- Movement: Kitchen sink realism
- Spouse(s): Jean Cooke (1954–1977); Patricia Rosenburg (until his death)
- Children: David Bratby b. 1955

John Randall Bratby RA (19 July 1928 – 20 July 1992) was an English painter who founded the kitchen sink realism style of art that was influential in the late 1950s. He made portraits of his family and celebrities. His works were seen in television and film. Bratby was also a writer.

== Early life and education ==
John Bratby was born on 19 July 1928 in Wimbledon, south-west London. Between 1949 and 1950, he studied art at Kingston College of Art. He then began attending the Royal College of Art, completing his studies in 1954. He painted landscapes, still lifes, portraits and figure compositions, and had his first solo exhibition that year at London's Beaux Arts Gallery.

He was given the opportunity to travel to Italy when he was awarded a bursary during his college years. However, the experience left him uninspired artistically, and uninterested in travelling.

== Career ==
=== Artist ===
Bratby is considered the founder of kitchen sink realism, a movement in which artists use everyday objects as their subjects, such as rubbish bins and beer bottles. Paintings in this style are often thickly-laden. It began in the early 1950s and has been considered an aspect of John Osborne's "Angry Young Men" movement. (Note: The term later became applied in Great Britain to a form of quarrelsome domestic drama epitomised by John Osborne's play Look Back in Anger. In America, the term was associated with Paddy Chayefsky and other dramatists who created gritty plays for live television during the 1950s.) Artists Derrick Greaves, Edward Middleditch and Jack Smith were also active in the movement's development. Bratby often painted with bright colours, capturing his middle-class family's daily lives. The faces of his subjects often appeared desperate and unsightly. Bratby painted several kitchen subjects, often turning practical utensils such as sieves and spoons into semi-abstract shapes. He also painted bathrooms, and made three paintings of toilets. Initially there was some critical interest, but English critics later disregarded the movement's importance.

In 1958, Bratby created works for the fictional artist Gulley Jimson in the Alec Guinness film The Horse's Mouth. A portion of Bratby's painting Four Lambrettas and Three Portraits of Janet Churchman (1958) is featured on the cover of Mark Knopfler's 2007 album Kill to Get Crimson.

As he matured, Bratby's works became "lighter and more exuberant". He made the mural Golgotha for Lancaster's St Martin's Chapel in 1965. During his career, Bratby promoted himself on television and the radio and was one of his generation's best-known artists. He mingled with celebrities to earn portrait commissions in the late 1960s. By the 1970s he had painted a series of portraits including of Billie Whitelaw.

Bratby was elected to the Royal Academy of Arts in 1971.

In the 1980s he travelled and made paintings of the cities he visited. He made intimately-posed portraits of his wife and self-portraits. He continued to paint with bright colours, but had developed "an economy of line". His paintings are shown in the 1984 television mini-series adaptation of Judith Krantz's novel Mistral's Daughter, about an artist.

Bratby's work fell out of favour with the emergence of Pop art, but his paintings have increased in value and critical support over recent years. Paul McCartney has been a collector of his works. McCartney had given Bratby two hours in Bratby's studio in 1967. Three portraits resulted from the sitting.

=== Writer ===
Bratby wrote the novels Breakdown (1960), Breakfast and Elevenses (published by Hutchinson; 1961), and Brake Pedal Down (1962). He also wrote a book about Stanley Spencer in 1970.

== Personal life and domestic abuse ==
Bratby was married first to the painter Jean Cooke. Afraid that Cooke might leave him, he locked her in his room once during their courtship. After their marriage in 1953, he was upset by the recognition her paintings achieved. He often painted over or "slashed" her works and restricted her painting time to three morning hours.

Bratby and Cooke's relationship experienced cycles of violence throughout their marriage. Jean left their home in fear, but would return based on the advice of their mentor and family friend, Carel Weight. She began signing her works with her maiden name at Bratby's insistence. (Note: John Bratby, "distinguished a painter as he was,... the reversion was entirely at his insistence. He feared and resented the competition she offered to his reputation as the one and only painting Bratby.") The couple had one daughter, Wendy, and three sons, Dayan, David and Jason. Their relationship was over by the 1970s, and they divorced in 1977.

Bratby died on 20 July 1992 in Hastings, Sussex, of a heart attack, leaving his widow, second wife Patti Rosenburg.

== Works ==
- Baby in pram in garden, oil on hardboard, 122 × 144.1 cm, 1956, Walker Art Gallery.
- Three Self Portraits with a White Wall, oil on hardboard, 241.9 × 196.9 cm, 1957, Walker Art Gallery. First prize winner of John Moores Liverpool Exhibition, Junior Section.
- The Rebel (1961 film). A satire: Bratby, William Green, and Alistair Grant's styles are lampooned.

== See also ==
- List of artists who created paintings and drawings for use in films
- The Bratby Bar at University of Birmingham is named after him and displays a number of his works that were donated to the University after his death.
