= Henryk Gotlib =

British painter (1890–1966)

- Self-portrait, 1957, oil on canvas 61x51,5 cm
- Born: 10 January 1890; Kraków, Austrian Poland
- Died: 30 December 1966 (aged 76); Godstone, England
- Education: Jan Matejko Academy of Fine Arts
- Movement: Expressionism

Henryk Gotlib (10 January 1890 – 30 December 1966) was a Polish painter, draughtsman, printmaker, and writer, who settled in England during World War II and made a significant contribution to modern British art. He was profoundly influenced by Rembrandt, and the European Expressionist painters. Gotlib was a leading member of the Polish avant-garde 'Formist' movement in the interwar Poland.

== Life ==
Gotlib was born into a middle-class Jewish family in Kraków, where he gained his earliest artistic training at the Academy of Fine Arts in Krakow from 1908 to 1910. Due to pressure from his parents, he also read law at the university in Krakow during this period, although it was clear from an early age that he had a profound passion for art. His earliest portraits of his mother, in which he experimented with a variety of styles including that of Vuillard and late Cubism, date back to when he was just 16 years old.

He continued his artistic training at the Kunstgewerbeschule in Vienna (1911–13) and later at the Munich Academy of Fine Art under Angelo Jank (1913–14). It was during this period that he was exposed to European Expressionist masters, falling under the influence of expressionists like Max Beckmann and Egon Schiele.

During his lifetime, Gotlib exhibited extensively throughout Europe with much success. His first one-man show – in Warsaw in 1918 – was organised by the Society of Polish Artists whom he joined at the end of World War I. The following year, Gotlib returned to Krakow and became a leading member of the Polish avant-garde 'Formist' movement, exhibiting in Berlin, Amsterdam and Paris. In 1922, the Van Gogh Gallery in Amsterdam held a one-man exhibition of his work.

There was never any doubt of Gotlib's stature in the mainstream of 20th Century European painting.

— C. M. Kauffmann, Director, Courtauld Institute of Art.

He lived in France, mainly in Paris, during the years 1923 through 1929, when he participated in exhibitions at the Salon d'Automne and the Salon des Indépendants. In 1930, he joined the Group of Ten after returning to Poland, where he remained until 1933. He went travelling once more from 1933, spending long periods in Italy, Greece and Spain, and met his Scottish wife, Janet Blanche Mareham, in 1938 during a visit to London. With the outbreak of World War II shortly after this, Gotlib settled in England, where he remained until his death. During his first year in England, Gotlib was invited to join the London Group, which had no foreign members at that time. This was a great honour, indeed an indication of his prolific talent as a painter.

Gotlib was also a talented writer. During his years in Paris he was art correspondent to the Warsaw Times, and his book Polish Painting was published in 1942. It tells us of his contemporary Polish artists and Polish artists through the ages. Polish Painting also provides some information of the 'Formist' movement, and includes a detail of his painting Warsaw, September 1939 that he was moved to paint after the German army attacked Warsaw. In the same year that this book was published, Gotlib participated in several important exhibitions in Britain, including 'Exhibition of Works of Polish and Czechoslovak Artists', at Oxford's Ashmolean Museum. He exhibited extensively in Britain from 1940 onwards and examples of his work can be found in many public collections (see heading 'public collections' below).

== Formism ==
Gotlib was a leading member of the Formist movement; an avant-garde art movement in Poland which originated around 1917–18 and lasted until around 1923–24. The movement was started by a group of energetic young artists, writers and poets who essentially pursued a passion for anti-naturalism. According to Gotlib, Formism "proclaimed an absolute break with the past and the rebirth of art [in Poland]." Polish art at the time was traditionally concerned with history painting and anecdote, emphasising the importance of narrative in art. With the deformation of nature, subordination of forms, abolishment of a single viewpoint and crude colouring, "the formist storm" attacked academicism and established a front against naturalism and the imitation of nature.

== Later years ==
As a figurative artist, he was largely neglected after the rise in popularity of abstract expressionism in the 1950s, and his final years were shadowed by depression, which is reflected in the sombre canvases from this period:

"Typically one thinks of oil paintings of nudes, dark in tone, grainy, with impasto, in texture, broad and bold in treatment...in the tradition of German expressionism".

In 1964, he was included in the exhibition 'Fifty years of British Art' at the Tate Gallery. Indeed, his contribution to British art is well known. In The Burlington Magazine in 1942, Tancred Borenius wrote: "A highly personal sense of colour in a lovely, luminous totality gives the keynote to his art"; Michel Strauss commented on the "strength and sensitivity" of his work in the same Journal in 1961.

Gotlib died in Godstone, Surrey, England, at the age of 76. After his death he was acknowledged with an important Arts Council retrospective exhibition at the Scottish National Gallery of Modern Art, Edinburgh, in July and August 1970, curated by Douglas Hall. This major exhibition toured to the Southampton Art Gallery, September 1970; and the National Museum of Wales, Cardiff, October–November 1970. Another major retrospective of his work took place in 1980 at the National Museum, Warsaw, Poland.

== Public collections ==
- His "powerful" painting Rembrandt in Heaven is in the collection of the Tate Gallery, London. "Altogether I do not learn more from anybody, except Rembrandt", wrote Gotlib in a letter to John Nowell, January 1964.
- A painted plaster self-portrait entitled Henryk Gotlib is in the collection of the National Portrait Gallery, London, and is on display in Room 31.
- Also in the collection of the National Portrait Gallery are 64 pencil drawings of international writers, scientists, diplomats and politicians, sketched by the artist at the international conference of scientists held in 1941 by the British Association.
- The Arts Council acquired the painting The Boat in 1961.
- Standing Nude is in the collection of the National Museum of Wales, Cardiff
- The Courtauld Gallery owns a small collection of paintings by Gotlib.

== The Ruth Borchard Collection ==
A 1955/6 self-portrait by Gotlib is in the Ruth Borchard Collection – an important collection of 100 British self-portraits. They were collected by Ruth Borchard – who famously would not pay more than 21 guineas for any one picture, irrespective of the artist's fame – during the 1950s and 1960s. Alongside Gotlib, the collection includes some of the most prominent figures of twentieth-century British art. Face to Face: British Self-Portraits in the Twentieth Century by Philip Vann, published in 2004, is a detailed examination of this remarkable collection.

== Writings by Gotlib ==
- Polish Painting, London: Minerva, 1942.
- Travels of a Painter, commissioned by a Warsaw publisher but interrupted by the outbreak of World War II. Written in 1938/39.

== See also ==
- Maurycy Gottlieb (1856–1879), Polish-Jewish realist painter of the Romantic period.

== Notes and references ==
- Tate Collection, description of Gotlib's Rembrandt in Heaven
- Gotlib in the National Portrait Gallery, London
- Gotlib in the University of Warwick Art Collection
- A selection of paintings by Henryk Gotlib at the Boundary Gallery, London
- Gotlib's works in Central Jewish Library
- 3 artworks by Henryk Gotlib at the Ben Uri site
