= Vida Goldstein =

Australian suffragist and social reformer (1869–1949)

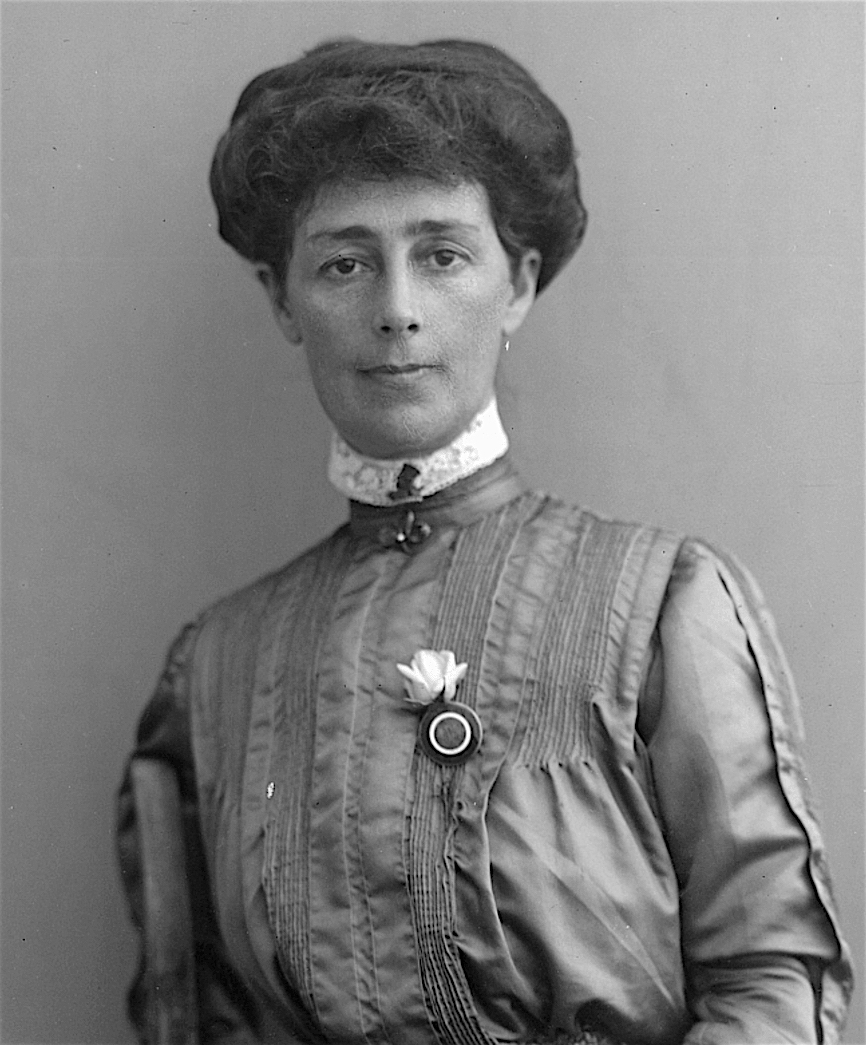
- Born: 13 April 1869; Portland, Victoria, Australia
- Died: 15 August 1949 (aged 80); South Yarra, Victoria, Australia
- Education: Presbyterian Ladies' College, Melbourne
- Occupations: Suffragist; Social reformer Magazine editor
- Known for: One of the first four Australian women to stand for parliament
- Relatives: Isabella Goldstein (mother)

Vida Jane Mary Goldstein (pron. /ˈvaɪdəˈɡoʊldstaɪn/) (13 April 1869 – 15 August 1949) was an Australian suffragist and social reformer. She was one of four female candidates at the 1903 federal election, the first at which women were eligible to stand. Goldstein was known both for her public speaking and as an editor of pro-suffrage publications. Despite her efforts campaigning for women's suffrage in Victoria, it was the last Australian state to implement equal voting rights, with women not granted the right to vote until 1908.

In 1903, Goldstein unsuccessfully contested the Senate as an independent, winning 16.8 percent of the vote. (Note: Each elector cast four votes (one for each vacancy), with the four most popular candidates being elected. The figure given is the proportion of the electorate who cast one of their votes for Goldstein.) She was one of the first four women to stand for federal parliament, along with Selina Anderson, Nellie Martel, and Mary Moore-Bentley. Goldstein ran for parliament a further four times, and despite never winning an election won back her deposit on all but one occasion. She stood on left-wing platforms, and some of her more radical views alienated both the general public and some of her associates in the women's movement.

After women's suffrage was achieved, Goldstein remained prominent as a campaigner for women's rights and various other social reforms. She was an ardent pacifist during World War I, and helped found the Women's Peace Army, an anti-war organisation. Goldstein maintained a lower profile in later life, devoting most of her time to the Christian Science movement. Her death passed largely unnoticed, and it was not until the late 20th century that her contributions were brought to the attention of the general public.

== Early life ==
Goldstein was born Vida Jane Mary Goldstein in Portland, Victoria, on 13 April 1869 to parents Isabella Goldstein (née Hawkins), who was a suffragist, dedicated to temperance and social reform, and Jacob Goldstein a commissioned lieutenant in the Victorian Garrison Artillery who rose to the rank of colonel. Jacob was born in Cork, Ireland, in 1839, his father was Jewish from Poland, his mother was Irish and Dutch. He arrived in Victoria in 1858 and settled initially at Portland. Isabella was born in Australia in 1849 to Scottish parents, and grew up in the south western Victoria. Isabella and Jacob were married on 3 June 1868. Both parents were devout Christians with strong social consciences. They had four more children – three daughters (Lina, Elsie and Aileen) and a son (Selwyn). With Isabella's marriage settlement, and Jacob's income the family were economically comfortable and were able to employ domestic staff.

Goldstein spent her early life in Portland and Warrnambool, until 1877 when the family moved to Melbourne. The family were heavily involved in charitable and social welfare causes, working closely with the Melbourne Charity Organisation Society, the Women's Hospital Committee, the Cheltenham Men's Home and the labour colony at Leongatha. Although an anti-suffragist Jacob believed strongly in education and self-reliance. He engaged a private governess to educate his four daughters and Goldstein was sent to Presbyterian Ladies' College in 1884, matriculating in 1886. When the family income was affected by the depression in Melbourne during the 1890s, Goldstein and her sisters, Aileen and Elsie, ran a co-educational preparatory school in St Kilda. Opening in 1892, the 'Ingleton' school would run out of the family home on Alma Road for the next six years.

== Career ==
=== Women's rights and suffrage ===
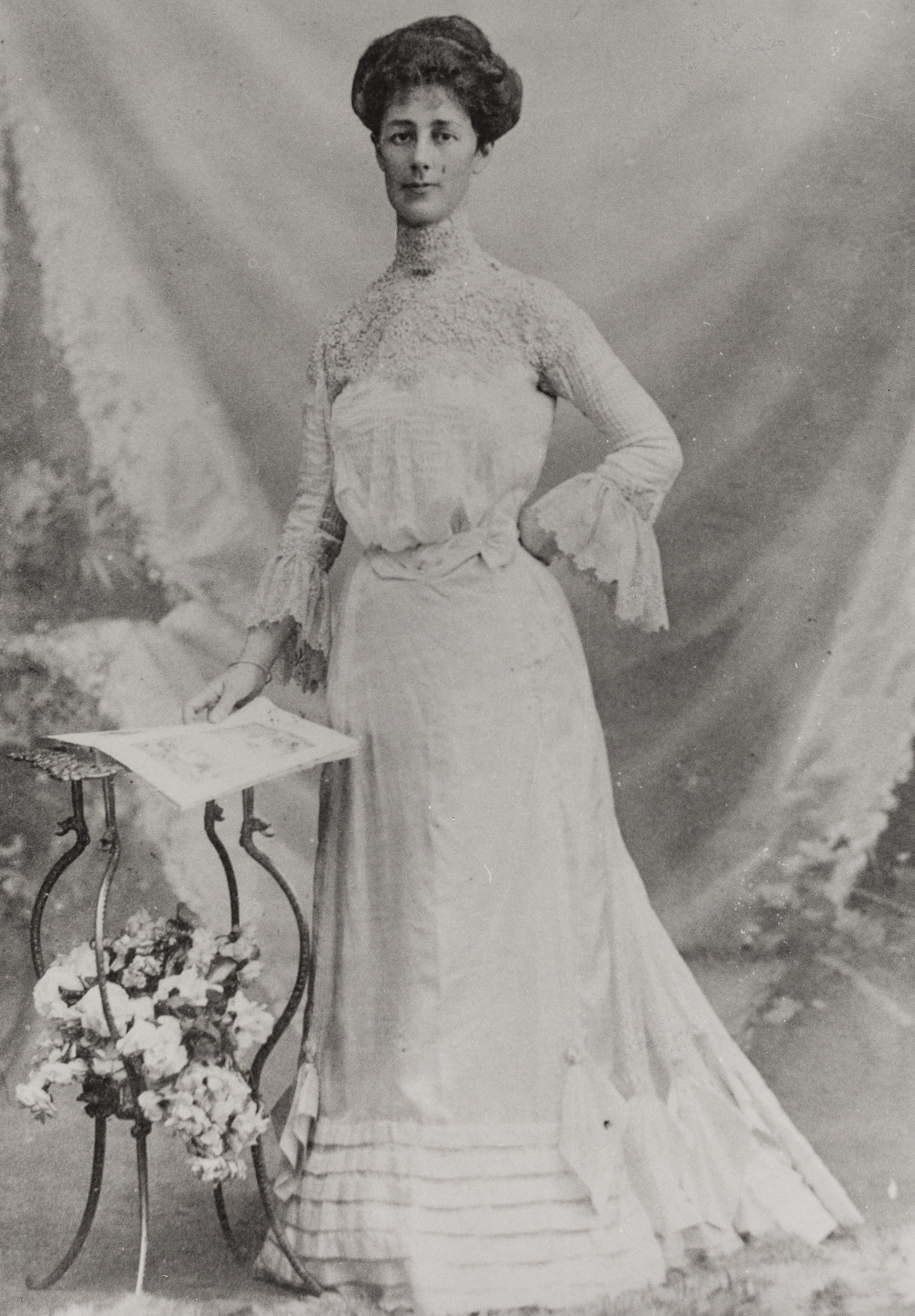
Goldstein in 1903

In her early 20s, Goldstein was enlisted to assist in social causes, particularity those related to women's rights, by her mother Isabella. In 1891 they collected signatures for the Victorian Women's Suffrage Petition. Such causes ultimately became Goldstein's life's work. She would stay on the periphery of the women's movement through the 1890s, but her primary interest during this period was with her school and urban social causes – particularly the National Anti-Sweating League and the Criminology Society. This work gave her first-hand experience of women's social and economic disadvantages, which she would come to believe were a product of their political inequality.

Through this work, she became friends with Annette Bear-Crawford, with whom she jointly campaigned for social issues including women's franchise and in organising an appeal for the Queen Victoria Hospital for women. After the death of Bear-Crawford in 1899, Goldstein took on a much greater organising and lobbying role for suffrage and became secretary for the United Council for Woman Suffrage. She became a popular public speaker on women's issues, orating before packed halls around Australia and eventually Europe and the United States. In 1902 she travelled to the United States, speaking at the International Women Suffrage Conference (where she was elected secretary), gave evidence in favour of female suffrage before a committee of the United States Congress, and attended the International Council of Women Conference.

From the 1890s until 1920, Goldstein actively supported women's rights and emancipation in a variety of fora, including the National Council of Women, the Victorian Women's Public Servants' Association and the Women Writers' Club. She actively lobbied parliament on issues such as equality of property rights, birth control, equal naturalisation laws, the creation of a system of children's courts and raising the age of marriage consent.

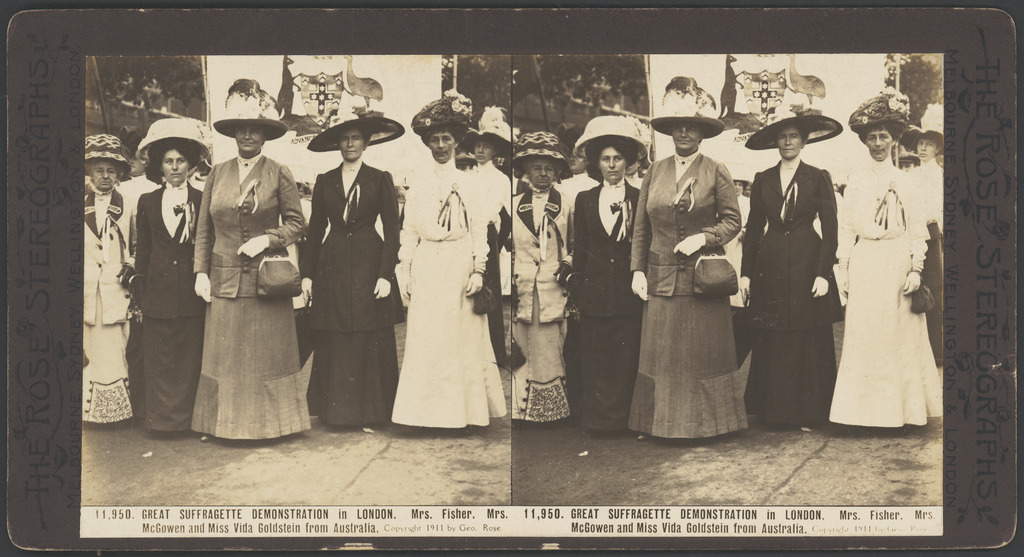
Goldstein pictured with other suffragettes at a demonstration in London during her visit to the UK

==== Tour of England 1911 ====
In early 1911, Goldstein visited England at the behest of the Women's Social and Political Union. Her speeches around the country drew huge crowds and her tour was touted as "the biggest thing that has happened in the women movement for some time in England". She included visits to Holiday Campaigns in the Lake District for Liverpool WPSU organiser Alice Davies, along with fellow activist and writer Beatrice Harraden.

Eagle House, near Bath, Somerset, had become an important refuge for British suffragettes who had been released from prison. Mary Blathwayt's parents were the hosts and they planted trees there between April 1909 and July 1911 to commemorate the achievements of suffragettes, including Emmeline Pankhurst and Christabel Pankhurst as well as Annie Kenney, Charlotte Despard, Millicent Fawcett and Constance Lytton. The trees were known as "Annie's Arboreatum" after Annie Kenney. There was also a "Pankhurst Pond" within the grounds.

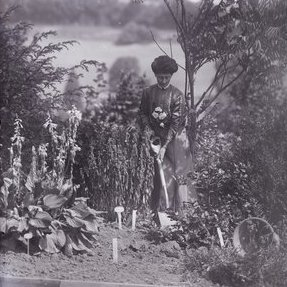
Goldstein at Eagle House in 1910

Goldstein was invited to Eagle House whilst she was in England. She planted a holly tree, and a plaque would have been made. A photograph of her planting the tree was taken by the owner, Colonel Linley Blathwayt.

Her trip in England concluded with the foundation of the Australia and New Zealand Women Voters Association, an organisation dedicated to ensuring that the British Parliament would not undermine suffrage laws in the antipodean colonies. Goldstein invited suffragette Louie Cullen to speak of her experiences in the London movement.

At that time, Goldstein was quoted as saying that woman represents "the mercury in the thermometer of the race. Her status shows to what degree it has risen out of barbarism". Australian feminist historian Patricia Grimshaw, has noted that Goldstein, like other white women of her day, considered "barbarism" to characterise Australian Aboriginal society and culture and, therefore, Indigenous women in Australia were not believed to be eligible for citizenship or the vote.

=== Running for political office ===
In 1902, Australian women won the right to vote in federal elections, so in 1903, Goldstein ran for parliament as an independent with the support of the newly formed Women's Federal Political Association, she was a candidate for the Australian Senate, becoming one of the first women in the British Empire to stand for election to a national parliament. She received 51,497 votes, winning 16.8 percent of the vote (nearly 5% of the total ballots) but failed to secure a Senate seat. The loss prompted her to concentrate on female education and political organisation, which she did through the Women's Political Association (WPA) and her monthly journal the Australian Women's Sphere. She stood for parliament again in 1910, 1913 and 1914; her fifth and last bid was in 1917 for a Senate seat on the principle of international peace, a position which lost her votes. She always campaigned on fiercely independent and strongly left-wing platforms which made it difficult for her to attract high support at the ballot. Her campaign secretary in 1913 was Doris Blackburn, later elected to the Australian House of Representatives.

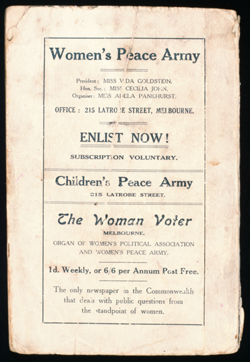
Women Peace Army advert

=== Publishing magazines ===
Goldstein's writings appeared in various periodicals and papers of the time were influential in the social life of Australia during the first twenty years of the 20th century. She also published magazines related to suffrage and politics. The first was the Australian Women's Sphere, which she described as the "organ of communication amongst the, at one time few, but now many, still scattered, supporters of the cause".

In 1909, having closed the Sphere in 1905 to dedicate herself more fully to the campaign for female suffrage in Victoria, she founded a second newspaper – Woman Voter. It became a supporting mouthpiece for her later political campaigns.

=== Anti-war campaigning ===
Throughout the First World War, Goldstein was an ardent pacifist. She became chairman of the Peace Alliance and formed the Women's Peace Army in 1915, and recruited Adela Pankhurst, recently arrived from England as an organiser.

== Later life ==
In 1919, she accepted an invitation to represent Australian women at a Women's Peace Conference in Zurich. In her ensuing three-year absence abroad, her public involvement with Australian feminism gradually ended. The Women's Political Association dissolved and her publications ceased printing. She continued to campaign for several public causes and continued to believe fervently in the unique and unharnessed contributions of women in society. Her writings in later decades became decidedly more sympathetic to socialist and labour politics.

In the last decades of her life, Goldstein's focus turned more intently to her faith and spirituality as a solution to the world's problems. She became increasingly involved with the Christian Science movement – whose Melbourne church she helped found. For the next two decades, she would work as a reader, practitioner and healer of the church. Despite many suitors, she never married and she lived in her last years with her two sisters, Aileen (who also never wed) and Elsie (the widow of Henry Hyde Champion). Goldstein died of cancer at her home in South Yarra, Victoria on 15 August 1949, aged 80. She was cremated and her ashes scattered.

== Posthumous ==
Although her death passed largely unnoticed at the time, Goldstein would later come to be recognised as a pioneer suffragist and important figure in Australian social history, and a source of inspiration for many later female generations. Second Wave Feminism led to a revival of interest in Goldstein and the publication of new biographies and journal articles.

In 1978, a street in the Canberra suburb of Chisholm was named Goldstein Crescent, honouring her work as a social reformer.

In 1984, the Division of Goldstein, a federal electorate in Melbourne was named after her. Seats in her honour have been installed in the Parliament House Gardens in Melbourne, and in Portland, Victoria.

She was inducted onto the Victorian Honour Roll of Women in 2001.

The Women's Electoral Lobby in Victoria named an award after her. In 2008, the centenary of women's suffrage in Victoria, Goldstein's contribution was remembered.

== In popular culture ==
Goldstein is one of the six Australians whose war experiences are presented in The War That Changed Us, a four-part television documentary series about Australia's involvement in World War I.

Goldstein appears as a major character in the Wendy James novel, Out of the Silence, which examined the case of Maggie Heffernan, a young Victorian woman who was convicted of drowning her infant son in Melbourne, in 1900.
