= Jean Cooke =

British artist and educator (1927–2008)

Jean Cooke (also Jean Bratby)
- Born: Jean Esme Oregon Cooke; 18 February 1927; South London, England
- Died: 6 August 2008 (aged 81); Birling Gap, East Sussex, England
- Education: Central School of Arts and Crafts, Camberwell College of Arts, Goldsmiths College, Royal College of Art
- Known for: Painting
- Spouse: John Bratby
- Patrons: Bethel Solomons, Brinsley Ford

Jean Esme Oregon Cooke RA (18 February 1927 – 6 August 2008) was an English painter of still lifes, landscapes, portraits and figures. She was a lecturer at the Royal Academy and regularly exhibited her works, including the summer Royal Academy exhibitions. She was commissioned to make portraits by Lincoln College and St Hilda's College, Oxford. Her works are in the National Gallery, Tate and the Royal Academy collections. In the early years of her marriage, she signed her works Jean Bratby.

== Early life ==
Jean Esme Oregon Cooke was born on 18 February 1927 in South London to Arthur Oregon Cooke and his wife. Arthur owned a shop in Blackheath, London (Note: The Daily Telegraph says that her father's grocery shop was in Lewisham.) where he sold hardware supplies and groceries. Until she was about 6 1/2 years old, Cooke spent a lot of time in her father's shop. Her mother saw little value in education and kept her out of school until then. Her mother had an artistic spirit, creating "beautiful colours to decorate the walls by subtly mixing odd touches of paint." As a young girl she drew, painted and modeled figures and heads in plasticine. She attended Blackheath High School.

== Early adulthood ==
Cooke began her art studies in 1943 at the Central School of Arts and Crafts. She studied life drawing under Bernard Meninsky, textile design, and illustration at the Central School until 1945. Cooke then studied sculpture at Goldsmiths College and pottery at Camberwell College of Arts. Interested in becoming a teacher, she enrolled in the teacher education course at Goldsmiths, which she completed in 1950.

Initially, Cooke was most interested in pursuing sculpture, partly because oils were expensive and clay was free at the college. One of her works won a prize, but after suffering a biking accident where she had dislocated her thumb, she worked in pottery. In 1950 she established a pottery workshop in Sussex.

John Bratby, a Royal College of Art painter, and Cooke began a tempestuous dating relationship. Bratby, afraid that she might leave him, locked her in his room once during their courtship. In April 1953 they were married and she took his last name. Later that year she entered the Royal College's post graduate program. Cooke's interest in painting grew under the tutelage of Ruskin Spear, Rodrigo Moynihan, and Carel Weight.

In 1964 she had her first solo exhibition at Leicester Galleries. She developed a following, including Bethel Solomons and Brinsley Ford who collected her regularly exhibited works. Bratby did not achieve the recognition that his wife received and he was upset by it, which made their relationship increasingly difficult. He often painted over or "slashed" her works and restricted her painting time to three morning hours. Bratby had affairs and was physically abusive and cruel. He was said, though, to have had an "enlivening, inspiring effect" on her artistically.

== Career ==
In 1964 she began teaching students to paint at the Royal College. The following year the Royal Academy made her an associate member and in 1972 she was made a full member. She lectured at the college until 1974. During the summers she exhibited her works at the Royal Academy exhibition. The seascape at her cottage (Note: The cottage was rented from the National Trust. It had set precariously near the edge of a cliff and was demolished for safety. Cooke then rented the next cottage in line, destined to survive only another 10 years.) and the landscape surrounding her Edwardian mansion featured in her paintings: "cherry trees in full bloom, long grass filled with buttercups and blue-flowering lungwort, or the dark evergreens lit by the house windows at night. Doves were favourite models and appeared frequently." She made self-portraits, (Note: Ruth Borchard, who collected paintings of British artists, offered Cooke 21 gunieaus for her self-portrait. Although it was half her usual commission, she made the painting, she said, to help increase the percentage of women painters in her collection. At the time, of her collection of 91 paintings, Borchard only had 3 women.) paintings of her husband; and portraits. She was commissioned by St Hilda's College, Oxford to paint its principal, Mary Bennett and was hired by Lincoln College to make portraits of Walter Oakeshott and Egon Wellesz. In the early 1980s she painted a full-length portrait of her next-door neighbor, the baroque cellist Richard Webb. Her works reflected sensitivity, beauty, and insight - made with a "subtle, understated, individual sense of colour." Piet Mondrian was one of her favourite artists. Her work has been compared to Gwen John and Paula Modersohn-Becker.

Cooke made several self-portraits, like Blast Bodicea, Jamais je ne pleure et jamais je ne ris (I never cry and I never laugh), and Self-Portrait (Tate). Her self-portraits often reflected humour to counterbalance the candid and not particularly flattering works. In them she was always searching for something, "the previously unperceived." Cooke commented that she had different motivations, sometimes wanting to be alone, or to be acknowledge, or to show off. Blast Bodicea was made at the urging of her husband, John Bratby, who had given her a heavy brass fireman's helmet to be included in the work. Although it became too difficult to paint while wearing the helmet, there are faint traces of the helmet visible in the painting.

Bratby and Cooke's relationship experienced cycles of violence throughout their marriage. Jean left their home in fear, but would return based on the advice of their mentor and family friend, Carel Weight. She began signing her works with her maiden name at Bratby's insistence. (Note: John Bratby, "distinguished a painter as he was,... the reversion was entirely at his insistence. He feared and resented the competition she offered to his reputation as the one and only painting Bratby.") The couple had one daughter, Wendy, and three sons, Dayan, David, Jason. They were all artistic. The family shared their time between two houses. One was a seaside cottage at Birling Gap and the other was a large, cold Edwardian manor, which had tennis courts, a swimming pool and a largely untended garden. The couple's relationship was over by the 1970s, and they divorced in 1977.

Starting in 1974 Cooke held "open studios" for the Greenwich Festival, something she continued until 1994. Her works are at the National Gallery, Tate and the Royal Academy.

== Later years ==
In 2003, her house caught fire, many of her paintings were lost, and the building was destroyed. (Note: Although she lost most of her possessions and many paintings, she was mollified by the survival of her oils and paint brushes.) She moved into a Charlton Village flat and continued her painting there. She died on 6 August 2008 at her second cottage at Birling Gap while looking at the sea out of her window. The cause of death was pneumonia.

Andrew Lambirth wrote of her in the days following her death:

Jean Cooke was a painter of wit and subtlety, a lovely and unusual colourist who painted landscape and still-life with great but understated feeling. She was also a figure painter, and a dab hand at portraits, but her finest achievement was in the depiction of the natural world: cliffs and the sea, a mountain meadow, the effects of mist or moonlight, a collection of fruit or flowers. In recent years, Cooke's still-lifes could appear somewhat minimal and haphazard, but they were always perfectly phrased and pitched. Solitary blooms against bare canvas with a scribble of background colour, they have the compression and self-sufficiency of a poem.

Friend and playwright Nell Dunn wrote that she had "a crazy sense of humour - she sees herself as a comic character in a comic world, with the only serious thing being painting."

== Professional organisations ==
Cooke became a Full Royal Academician in 1972, and for many years her work has appeared annually in the Royal Academy's Summer Exhibition. She was on the Council of the Royal Academy in 1983 to 1985, 1992 to 94, and 2001 to 2002. In 1993 and 1994, she was a Senior hanger at the Royal Academy.

From 1984 to 1986, Cooke was governor of the Central School of Art and Design. She sat on the academic board of the Blackheath School of Art from 1986 to 1988. She was a member of the Friends of Woodlands Art Gallery.

== Works ==
A selection of her works include:

- Birth of Icarus, 1998, Piano Nobile Fine Paintings
- Blast Boadicea, oil on canvas, 1960, Royal Academy of Arts, London
- Dream Dream, 2008
- Egon Joseph Wellesz (1885-1974), Lincoln College, University of Oxford
- Grassland, Government Art Collection
- Jamais je ne pleure et jamais je ne ris (I never cry and I never laugh), oil on canvas, c. 1972, Royal Academy of Arts, London
- John Bratby (1928-1992), Royal Academy of Arts
- John Bratby (1928-1992), Royal College of Art
- Lily, Lily on the Brow, Calderdale Metropolitan Borough Council
- Mad Self Portrait, Tullie House Museum and Art Gallery
- Mary Bennett, Principal (1965-1980) St Hilda's College, University of Oxford
- Richard Webb, Baroque Cellist, c.1982, Private collection.
- Not Waving, Just Painting, Usher Gallery, The Collection: Art & Archaeology in Lincolnshire
- Portrait of a Boy, Kirklees Museums and Galleries
- Self-Portrait, Tate, 1958
- Sir Walter Oakeshott (1903-1987), Lincoln College, University of Oxford
- The greenhouse, oil on board, 1955
- The Italian Straw Hat, London Borough of Camden
- The yellow cliff, oil on canvas, 1974
- Through the Looking Glass, 1960, Royal Academy of Arts
- Union Wharf, Government Art Collection
- Young girl with parasol, oil on board

== Exhibitions ==
Some of her exhibitions were:

- 1956 - The first year her work was included in group exhibitions
- 1963 - Her first solo exhibition was held at the Establishment Club in London
- 1964 - Solo exhibition at the Leicester Galleries
- 1965 - Bear Lane Gallery in Oxford
- 1965 - Moyan Gallery, Manchester
- 1971 - New Grafton Gallery, London
- 1974 - Group exhibitions at Agnews
- 1976 - Dulwich Picture Gallery
- 1976 - "British Painting 1952 to 1977" at the Royal Academy
- 1979 - Tate Gallery
- 1980 - Norwich Gallery
- 1990 - Sir Hugh Casson Room for Friends at the Royal Academy of Arts
- 1996 - Along with Maggi Hambling, she contributed to "In The Looking Glass", an exhibition at the Usher Gallery, Lincoln, that brought together a group of contemporary self-portraits by women.
