= May Brodney =

Australian labour activist (1894-1973)

- Born: (Maria) May Francis; 13 April 1894; Malvern, Victoria, Australia
- Died: 21 August 1973 (aged 79); Mount Evelyn, Victoria, Australia
- Occupations: textile worker and trade unionist
- Spouse: Brodney

(Maria) May Brodney previously known as May Francis (13 April 1894 – 21 August 1973) was an Australian labour activist and a founder member of the Communist Party of Australia in Melbourne.

== Life ==
Brodney was born in 1894 in the Melbourne suburb of Malvern. Her parents were Julia, (born Roonan) and John Francis. They had both been born in Ireland, but they met in Australia after they arrived in 1888. She rejected her parents Catholic beliefs and by 1910 she was employed as an underwear-machinist. She joined Vida Goldstein in the feminist Women's Political Association and she started the Women's Industrial and Social Union in 1914 but she was disappointed by its progress.

During the first world war she was an active opponent of conscription into the armed services.

She joined the new in 1915 and became active on its behalf. She endeavored to organise women workers and she became a member of the unions executive. She was the union's representative on the Trades Hall Council, the Underclothing Board and the Court of Industrial Appeals. She was involved with the union until 1929.

In 1920 she was a founder member of the Communist Party of Australia in Melbourne. In 1946 she published work in support of a 40-hour week.

Brodney and her husband bought a log-cabin called "Appin" in the Melbourne suburb of Mount Evelyn. In 1963 M.Brodney, published "Militant Propagandists of the Labor Movement" about the early years of the Labor movement mentioning "May Francis" aka "Mrs Brodney". Her account is written to re-establish her version of events.

She died in Mount Evelyn in 1973.

== Private life ==
She married Alfred Tennyson Brodney in 1924. He was known as "Bob". Her husband founded a company dealing in car tyres that went bankrupt. He had been found guilty the year before they married in dealing in tyres after he was declared bankrupt as the tyres did not belong to him. He later went on to be a solicitor.
