= Celia Paul =

British artist (born 1959)

- Born: 11 November 1959 (age 67); Thiruvananthapuram, India
- Spouse: Steven Kupfer (m. 2011; died 2021)
- Partner: Lucian Freud (1978–1988)
- Children: 1

Celia Paul (born 11 November 1959) was born in India of British missionary parents and moved to England when she was five. She is a painter, best known for her intense, haunting portraits of her close family and herself. Paul lives and works in London, England.

== Biography ==
Celia Paul was born on 11 November 1959 in Thiruvananthapuram, South India.

From 1976 to 1981 she studied at the Slade School of Fine Art in London, where she met Lucian Freud who was a visiting tutor and with whom she had a relationship from ages 18 to 28. He was 37 years older than she was.

Paul was represented by Bernard Jacobson Gallery, London from 1984 to 1986 and then by Marlborough Fine Art, London from 1989 to 2014. She has been represented by Victoria Miro, London since May 2014.

A solo exhibition of new work by the artist titled Celia Paul: Memory and Desire took place at Victoria Miro in London, 6 April–14 May 2022. The exhibition coincided with the publication of Letters to Gwen John, a new book by the artist published by Jonathan Cape and New York Review Books which centres on a series of letters addressed to the painter Gwen John (1876–1939), who has long been a tutelary spirit for Paul.

Paul wrote her autobiography Self-Portrait, which was released in 2019 and well received by newspapers, including The Guardian, The New York Times Magazine, and The New York Review of Books.

== Style and influences ==
Celia Paul's paintings are intimate depictions of people and places that she knows well. She does no portrait commissions. Her paintings have a haunting otherworldly feeling. "Throughout all her work the sense of sight is associated with a world of potential, within. This is how a sense of the ineffable is able to be communicated". Paul worked on a series of paintings of her mother from 1977 to 2007, and since then she has concentrated on her four sisters, especially her sister Kate. "[T]he real strength of Paul's project becomes apparent with time: the concentrated emotional energy of chronicling a family and its subtle shifts over many years". Recently her work has taken a new direction, focusing on landscapes and the sea. She "is a creator of subterranean images. Her canvases are Impressionism in conversation with modernism — objective but felt".

Paul lives and works in her studio which is directly opposite the main gates of the British Museum.

== Personal life ==
From the age of 18 to 28, Paul was in a romantic relationship with Lucian Freud. She has a son with him, Frank Paul (born 10 December 1984), who is also an artist. She was married to Steven Kupfer from 2011 until his death in 2021.

== Solo exhibitions ==
- Celia Paul: Innervisions, Gladstone, New York, April 28 — June 13, 2026
- Celia Paul: Colony of Ghosts, Victoria Miro, London, 14 March – 17 April 2025
- Celia Paul: Memory and Desire, Victoria Miro, London, 6 April — 14 May 2022
- Celia Paul: Self-Portrait, an extended reality (XR) exhibition on Vortic Collect, Victoria Miro, London, UK, 10 November — 12 December 2020
- Celia Paul: My Studio, an extended reality (XR) exhibition on Vortic Collect, Victoria Miro, London, UK, 26 June — 25 July 2020
- Celia Paul, Victoria Miro, London, 13 November – 20 December 2019
- The Hilton Als Series: Celia Paul, Yale Center for British Art, 3 April — 12 August 2018, traveled to the Huntington, San Marino, 9 February – 8 July 2019
- The Sea and The Mirror, Victoria Miro Venice, 23 September — 21 December 2017
- Desdemona for Hilton by Celia, Victoria Miro, London, 16 September — 29 October 2016
- Desdemona for Celia by Hilton, Gallery Met, New York, September 22, 2015 — January 2, 2016. Collaboration with The New Yorker staff writer Hilton Als.
- Celia Paul, Victoria Miro, 12 June — 2 August 2014
- Gwen John and Celia Paul: Painters in Parallel, Pallant House Gallery, Chichester, 2012–2013
- Celia Paul, Graves Art Gallery, Sheffield, 2005
- Celia Paul: Stillness, Abbot Hall, Kendal, 2004
- Regular solo exhibitions at Marlborough Fine Art, 1991–2013
- Celia Paul, Bernard Jacobson Gallery, 1986

== Group exhibitions ==
- "Pictus Porrectus: Reconsidering the Full-Length Portrait", curated by Dodie Kazanjian and Alison Gingeras, Isaac Bell House, Newport, Rhode Island, 1 July – 2 October 2022
- "Me, Myself, I – Artists’ Self-Portraits", Royal West of England Academy, Bristol, 2 May – 19 June 2022
- "Figuration", Marlborough Gallery, London, 17 March – 29 April 2022
- "The Sublime in Nature", Daniel Malarkey, London, 16 June – 10 July 2021
- "I See You", an extended reality (XR) exhibition on Vortic Collect, Victoria Miro, London, 2 June – 4 July 2020
- "Parley for the Oceans x Vortic", online exhibition on Vortic, 2 October – 2 November 2020
- "Works on Paper", Galleri Bo Bjerggaard, Copenhagen, 26 January – 6 April 2019
- "Unparalleled Journey through Contemporary Art of Past 50 Years", Rubell Museum, Miami, USA, on view since 4 December 2019
- "Contemporary Dialogues with Tintoretto", Palazzo Ducale and Galleria Giorgio Franchetti alla Ca’ d’Oro, Venice, 20 October 2018 – 24 February 2019
- "Studio Prints: a Survey", Marlborough Fine Art, London, 30 November – 21 December 2018
- "All Too Human", Tate Britain, 28 February – 26 August 2018; travelling to Museum of Fine Arts, Budapest, 9 October 2018 – 13 January 2019
- "House Work", Victoria Miro Mayfair, London, 1 February – 18 March 2017
- "NO MAN'S LAND: Women Artists from the Rubell Family Collection", Rubell Family Collection, Miami, 2015 – 2016
- "Forces in Nature", curated by Hilton Als; Victoria Miro, London, 2015
- Work presented at Frieze Art Fair, London, 2014 by Victoria Miro
- "Cinematic Visions: Painting at the Edge of Reality", curated by James Franco, Isaac Julien and Glenn Scott Wright, Victoria Miro, London, 2013
- "Self-Consciousness", curated by Peter Doig and Hilton Als, VeneKlasen/Werner, Berlin, 2010
- "Psycho", curated by Danny Moynihan, Anne Faggionato, London, 2000
- "School of London", Odette Gilbert, London, 1989
- "British Figurative Art: Sickert to Bacon", Israel Museum, Jerusalem, 1989
- "School of London: Bacon to Bevan", Musée Maillol, Paris, 1998
- "September", curated by Peter Doig, The approach, London, 1997

== Films and interviews ==
- Celia Paul: Private View, directed by Jake Auerbach, 2019
- In Conversation with Hilton Als, Victoria Miro, London, 8 July 2014
- Artists at War: Walter Sickert, directed by Danny Katz, 2014
- Woman's Hour, broadcast on BBC Radio 4, 1 October 2012
- The Last Art Film, directed by Jake Auerbach, 2010
- Lucian Freud, directed by Randall Wright, 2011
- Lucian Freud, directed by Jake Auerbach, 2004

== Public collections ==
British Museum, London; National Portrait Gallery, London; Victoria and Albert Museum, London; Saatchi Collection, London; Abbot Hall, Kendal; Metropolitan Museum of Art, New York; Yale Center for British Art, Connecticut; Carlsberg Foundation, Copenhagen; Frissiras Museum, Athens; Herzog Anton Ulrich Museum, Brunswick, Germany; Morgan Library, New York; New Hall Art Collection, Cambridge.
