= Frank Auerbach =

German-born British painter (1931–2024)

- Born: Frank Helmut Auerbach; 29 April 1931; Berlin, Germany
- Died: 11 November 2024 (aged 93); London, England
- Citizenship: United Kingdom (from 1947)
- Education: St Martin's School of Art; Royal College of Art; Borough Polytechnic
- Known for: Painting
- Movement: School of London
- Spouse: Julia Wolstenholme (m. 1958; died 2024)
- Children: Jake

Frank Helmut Auerbach (29 April 1931 – 11 November 2024) was a German-born British painter. Born in Germany to Jewish parents, he became a naturalised British subject in 1947. He is considered one of the leading names in the School of London, with fellow artists Francis Bacon and Lucian Freud, both of whom were early supporters of his work.

== Early life and education ==
Auerbach was born on 29 April 1931 in Berlin, Germany, the son of Max Auerbach, a patent lawyer, and Charlotte Nora Borchardt, who had trained as an artist. With rising Nazi persecution of Jews such as themselves, his parents sent him to Britain in 1939, one of six such children sponsored by British writer Iris Origo. His parents stayed behind in Germany, and were murdered in the Auschwitz concentration camp in 1942.

In Britain, Auerbach became a pupil at Bunce Court School, near Faversham in Kent, where he excelled in not only art but also drama classes. Indeed, he almost became an actor, even taking a small role in Peter Ustinov's play House of Regrets at the Unity Theatre in St. Pancras, at the age of 17. But his interest in art proved a stronger draw and he began studying in London, first at St Martin's School of Art from 1948 to 1952, and at the Royal College of Art from 1952 to 1955. Yet, perhaps the clearest influence on his art training came from a series of additional art classes he took at London's Borough Polytechnic, where he and fellow St Martin's student Leon Kossoff were taught by David Bomberg from 1947 until 1953.

== Career ==
In 1955, he began teaching in secondary schools, but he quickly moved into the visiting tutor circuit at numerous art schools, including Bromley, Sidcup and the Slade School. In particular, he taught one day a week from 1958 to 1965 at Camberwell School of Art. He was the teacher, influence and sponsor of many artists, including Tom Philips, Jenny Saville, Cecily Brown, Peter Saunders and Ray Atkins. For instance, he wrote to Andrew Forge, senior lecturer at the Slade to say that there were some remarkable students that he might consider, particularly Ray Atkins and Jo Keys, obtaining a place for them there.

Auerbach's first solo exhibition was at the Beaux Arts Gallery in London in 1956, followed by further solo shows there between 1959 and 1963. His work was featured at Marlborough Fine Art in London at regular intervals after 1965 as well as at the Marlborough Gallery in New York in 1969, 1982, 1994, 1998 and 2006. In 1978, he was the subject of a major retrospective exhibition at the Hayward Gallery and was included in the exhibition A New Spirit in Painting at the Royal Academy of Arts in 1981. In 1986, he represented Britain in the Venice Biennale, sharing the Golden Lion with Sigmar Polke. Further exhibitions were featured at: the Yale Center for British Art in 1981, alongside Michael Andrews, Francis Bacon, William Coldstream, Lucian Freud, Patrick George, Leon Kossoff and Euan Uglow; the Kunstverein in 1986; the Van Gogh Museum in 1989; Marlborough Graphics in 1990; the Yale Center for British Art in 1991; the National Gallery in 1995; the Royal Academy of Arts in 2001.

From 2007 to 2008, Auerbach held a solo show entitled Frank Auerbach Etchings and Drypoints 1954–2006 at the Fitzwilliam Museum, which toured to the Abbot Hall Art Gallery. In 2009, he had another solo show at the Courtauld Institute of Art. Auerbach was the subject of a television film entitled Frank Auerbach: To the Studio, directed by Hannah Rothschild and produced by Jake Auerbach (Jake Auerbach Films Ltd). This was first broadcast on the arts programme Omnibus on 10 November 2001.

London's Tate Britain, in association with the Kunstmuseum Bonn, organised a major retrospective of Auerbach's work in 2015 and 2016. The exhibit was curated by Catherine Lampert together with the artist. David Bowie owned Auerbach's Head of Gerda Boehm as part of his private collection. After Bowie's death in 2016, this piece was among many put up for auction in November 2016, where it was sold for £3.8 million (US$4.7 million). In 2024, the exhibition Frank Auerbach. The Charcoal Heads at The Courtauld Gallery showcased a series of large-scale charcoal drawings by Auerbach, created in post-war London during the 1950s and early 1960s.

== Style and influences ==
Head of E.O.W. IV, 1961, National Gallery of Scotland

Auerbach was a figurative painter, who focused on portraits and city scenes in and around the area of London in which he lived, Camden Town. Although sometimes described as expressionistic, Auerbach was not an expressionist painter. His work is not concerned with finding a visual equivalent to an emotional or spiritual state that characterised the expressionist movement; rather, it deals with the attempt to resolve the experience of being in the world in paint. In this, the experience of the world is seen as essentially chaotic with the role of the artist being to impose an order upon that chaos and record that order in the painting. This ambition with the paintings resulted in Auerbach developing intense relationships with particular subjects, particularly the people he paints, but also the location of his cityscape subjects.

Speaking on this in 2001 he stated: "If you pass something every day and it has a little character, it begins to intrigue you." This simple statement belies the intensity of the relationship that developed between Auerbach and his subjects, which resulted in an astonishing desire to produce an image the artist considered 'right'. This led Auerbach to paint an image and then scrape it off the canvas at the end of each day, repeating this process time and again, not primarily to create a layering of images but because of a sense of dissatisfaction with the image leading him to try to paint it again.

This also indicates that the thick paint in Auerbach's work, which led to some of his 1950s paintings being considered difficult to hang, partly due to their weight and according to some newspaper reports in case the paint fell off, is not primarily the result of building up a lot of paint over time. It was in fact applied in a very short space of time, and may well have been scraped off very soon after application. This technique was not always considered positively, with the Manchester Guardian newspaper commenting in 1956 that: "The technique is so fantastically obtrusive that it is some time before one penetrates to the intentions that should justify this grotesque method." This intensity of approach and handling also did not always sit well with the art world that developed in Britain from the late 1980s onwards, with one critic at that time, Stuart Morgan, denouncing Auerbach for espousing "conservatism as if it were a religion" on the basis that he applied paint without a sense of irony.

As well as painting street scenes close to his London home, Auerbach tended to paint a small number of people repeatedly, including Estella Olive West (indicated in painting titles as EOW), Juliet Yardley Mills (or JYM) and Auerbach's wife Julia Auerbach (née Wolstenholme). He painted art historian and curator Catherine Lampert regularly from 1978 – when she organised his retrospective at the Hayward Gallery – until his death.

A strong emphasis in Auerbach's work is its relationship to the history of art. Showing at the National Gallery in London in 1994, he made direct reference to the gallery's collection of paintings by Rembrandt, Titian and Rubens. Unlike the National Gallery's Associate Artist Scheme, however, Auerbach's work after historic artists was not the result of a short residency at the National Gallery; it has a long history, and in this exhibition he showed paintings made after Titian's Bacchus and Ariadne, from the 1970s, to Rubens' Samson and Delilah, made in 1993. Auerbach's personal history, and his painting style, mixed with another person and not with Auerbach's consent, are part of the basis for the character "Max Ferber" in W. G. Sebald's award-winning collection of narratives The Emigrants (1992 in Germany, 1996 in Britain). He is celebrated in his obituary in The Times as a "reclusive giant of modern art", though his son Jake sees his father's reputation as a hermit as overstated, noting that he "was, in fact, fun to be with", enjoyed theatre and cinema, "loved pub quizzes and ... would join me and friends as a team member."

== Personal life ==
He met Julia Wolstenholme at the Royal College of Art; they were married from 1958 until her death in January 2024, though they separated for a dozen years in the 1960s and 1970s, later reconciling to form what their son called "an unorthodox but reasonably functional family". In 1958, their only child, Jacob "Jake" Auerbach, was born. A film director, he produced a documentary film, Frank: by Jake, in which Auerbach comments on his 60-year career and a video walkthrough of one of his shows.

His cousin is the German literary critic Marcel Reich-Ranicki.

Auerbach died in London on 11 November 2024, at the age of 93.

== Art market ==
The highest price to date for one of Auerbach's paintings was £5,565,200 ($7,079,855) for Mornington Crescent (1969) at Sotheby's, London, on 27 June 2023.

== Bibliography ==
- Frank Auerbach, British Council, The British Council Visual Arts Publications (1986), ISBN 978-0-86355-037-9
- Frank Auerbach, Robert Hughes, Thames & Hudson Ltd (1990), ISBN 978-0-500-27675-4
- Frank Auerbach: Paintings and Drawings 1954–2001, Catherine Lampert and Norman Rosenthal, Royal Academy of Arts (8 October 2001), ISBN 978-0-900946-99-8
- Frank Auerbach: The London Building Sites 1952–1962, Barnaby Wright, Paul Moorhouse and Margaret Garlake, Paul Holberton Publishing (2010), ISBN 978-1-903470-94-7
- Frank Auerbach: Early Works 1954–1978, Paul Moorhouse, Offer Waterman & Co (2012), ISBN 978-0-9574188-0-6
- Frank Auerbach, T.J. Clark and Catherine Lampert, Tate Publishing (2015), ISBN 978-1-84976-271-7
- Frank Auerbach: Speaking and Painting, Catherine Lampert, Thames & Hudson (2015), ISBN 978-0-500-29399-7
- Frank Auerbach, William Feaver, Rizzoli International Publications (2009); (2022), ISBN 978-0-8478-7210-7
- Frank Auerbach: The Sitters, Piano Nobile Publications (2022), ISBN 978-1-901192-62-9
