= Wendy James (author) =

Australian crime writer

- Born: 1966 (age 59–60); Sydney
- Occupation: writer
- Writing career
- Language: English
- Years active: 1995-
- Notable work: Out of the Silence : A Story of Love, Betrayal, Politics and Murder
- Notable awards: Ned Kelly Award

Wendy James (born in Sydney, 1966) is an Australian author of crime and literary fiction. James received a Bachelor of Arts from the University of Sydney an MA (writing) from University of Technology, Sydney and a PhD from the University of New England, Armidale.

James is the eldest sister of Young Adult author Rebecca James. She lives in Newcastle, New South Wales.

== Awards ==
- Ned Kelly Awards for Crime Writing, Best first crime novel, 2006: Out of the Silence : A Story of Love, Betrayal, Politics and Murder
- Dobbie Encouragement Award, 2006: shortlisted for Out of the Silence : A Story of Love, Betrayal, Politics and Murder
- Ned Kelly Awards for Crime Writing, Best Novel, 2017: shortlisted for The Golden Child

== Bibliography ==
=== Novels ===
- Out of the Silence : A Story of Love, Betrayal, Politics and Murder (2005)
- The Steele Diaries (Vintage, 2008; Momentum, 2013)
- Where Have You Been? (UWAP, 2010)
- The Mistake (Penguin, 2012)
- The Lost Girls (Penguin, 2014)
- The Golden Child (HarperCollins, 2017)
- The Accusation (HarperCollins, 2019)
- A Little Bird (Lake Union, 2021)

=== Short stories ===
- ''Why She Loves Him'' (UWAP, 2009)
