= Australian Woman's Sphere =

Women's magazine in Australia (1900–1905)

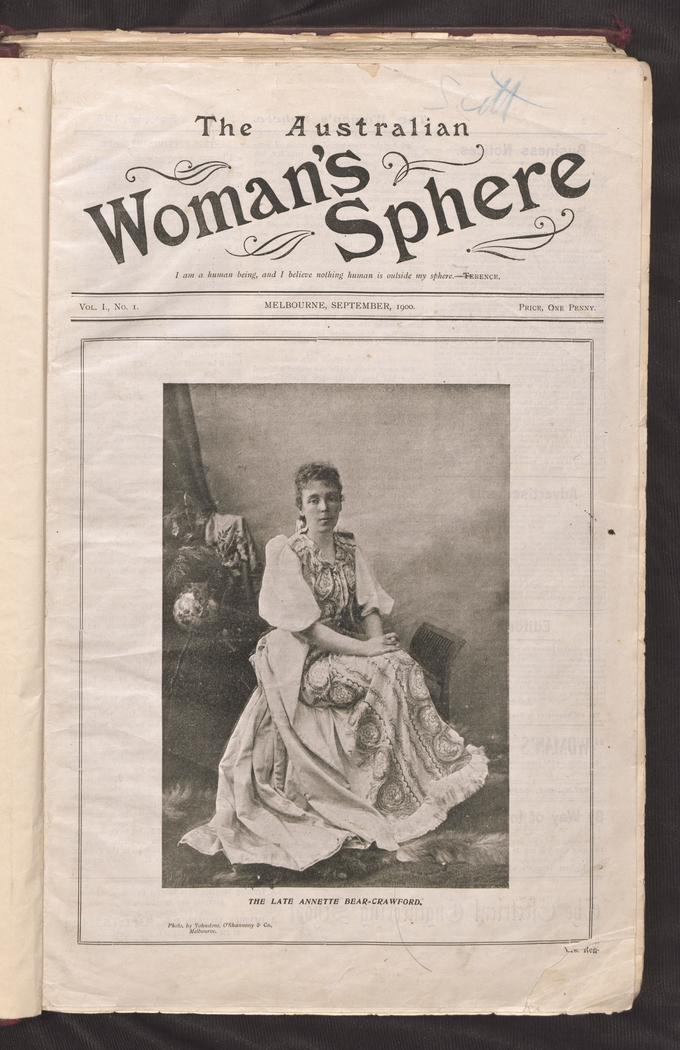
- The front page of the first edition of Australian Woman's Sphere
- Categories: Women's magazine
- Frequency: Monthly
- Publisher: John Osborne
- Founder: Vida Goldstein
- First issue: September 1900
- Final issue Number: 15 June 1904; 46
- Country: Australia
- Based in: Melbourne
- Language: English
- OCLC: 232117120

Australian Woman's Sphere was a monthly journal published by Vida Goldstein which advocated for women's suffrage in Victoria. The title of the magazine was an objection to the traditional view that a woman's sphere is her home. Because Goldstein supported the idea that a woman's sphere is the world.

The journal was first published in Melbourne, Victoria, in September 1900. Its last issue numbered 46 appeared on 15 June 1904.
