= Out of the Silence (James novel) =

Book by Wendy James

- First edition
- Author: Wendy James
- Language: English
- Genre: novel
- Publisher: Random House, Australia
- Publication date: 2005
- Publication place: Australia
- Media type: Print (Paperback)
- Pages: 351
- ISBN: 1740513835
- Followed by: The Steele Diaries

Out of the Silence (2005) is a novel by Australian author Wendy James. It won the 2006 Ned Kelly Award for Best First Crime Novel.

== Plot summary ==
The novel is based on the true-life story of Maggie Heffernan, who, in early 1900, was convicted in Melbourne of the drowning murder of her infant son. The novel follows her grim journey from the country to the city, vainly seeking her ex-fiance, finding herself destitute and finally accused of a dreadful crime. Vida Goldstein is an educated single woman running a local private school, campaigning for votes for women and contemplating running for parliament. Elizabeth Hamilton lives in Vida's aunt's house in suburban Melbourne - an upper middle-class life that provides a sharp contrast with poor Maggie's circumstances. Elizabeth and Vida take up Maggie's cause after her arrest and while their efforts don't meet with total success, all characters are changed by the events within the book.

== Notes ==
- Sub-titled: A Story of Love, Betrayal, Politics and Murder
- Dedication: For Darren - for everything
- Epigraph: "History, real solemn history, I cannot be interested in...I read it a little as a duty; but it tells me nothing that does not either vex or weary me. The quarrels of popes and kings, with wars and pestilences in every page; the men all so good for nothing, and hardly any women at all - it is very tiresome." Jane Austen, Northanger Abbey, 1817

== Reviews ==
Mindy Laube in The Sydney Morning Herald noted: "Rich period detail and a humane realism inform this stunning debut."

== Awards and nominations ==
- 2006 shortlisted Nita Kibble Literary Award
- 2006 winner Ned Kelly Awards for Crime Writing — Best First Novel
