= Out of the Silent Planet (disambiguation) =

Out of the Silent Planet is a novel by C. S. Lewis.

Out of the Silent Planet may also refer to:

- "Out of the Silent Planet" (song), a song by Iron Maiden
- Out of the Silent Planet (album), an album by King's X
