= Leon Kossoff =

British figurative painter (1926–2019)

- Born: 10 December 1926; Islington, London, England
- Died: 4 July 2019 (aged 92); London, England
- Known for: Painting
- Movement: neo-expressionism, School of London

Leon Kossoff (10 December 1926 – 4 July 2019) was a British figurative painter known for his portraits, life drawings and cityscapes of London, England. He is considered a neo-expressionist painter.

== Early years and education ==
Kossoff was born on City Road in Islington, London. He spent most of his early life living there with his Russian-Jewish immigrants from Ukraine. His father was a baker. In 1938, he attended the Hackney Downs School in London. In 1939, he was evacuated with the school to King's Lynn, Norfolk, where he lived with Mr and Mrs R.C. Bishop, who encouraged his interest in art. During this time, Kossoff made his first paintings. When he returned to London in 1943, Kossoff went to Saint Martin's School of Art, and studied commercial art. He also attended life drawing classes in the evenings at Toynbee Hall.

He spent three years in military service with the Royal Fusiliers, attached to the 2nd Battalion Jewish Brigade, and served in Italy, Holland, Belgium and Germany. After his military service, he returned to the Saint Martin's School of Art in 1949, and at Borough Polytechnic, took special classes under David Bomberg from 1950 to 1952. He was also influenced by another one of his teacher's students, Frank Auerbach. Both young artists dealt with similar emotions and subject matter in their work, and employed heavy impasto in their paintings. Kossoff chose his subject matter mostly from the area of London where he was born. From 1950 to 1953, Kossoff's studio was located at Mornington Crescent; he then moved to Bethnal Green, where he lived until 1961. Kossoff studied at the Royal College of Art from 1953 to 1956.

== Career ==
In 1956, Kossoff joined Helen Lessore's Beaux Arts Gallery, located on Bruton Place in London. In 1959, Kossoff began to teach at the Regent Street Polytechnic, the Chelsea School of Art, and the Saint Martin's School of Art, all in London. While teaching, he continued his artistic career, and soon started featuring in galleries and shows, along with his friend Frank Auerbach and other artists such as Francis Bacon, Lucian Freud and Keith Critchlow, a school friend from Saint Martin's. During this time, Kossoff moved his studio to Willesden Junction, and in 1966, moved his studio to Willesden Green permanently.

In 1995, Kossoff exhibited his artworks at the 46th Venice Biennale, and in 1996 he was the subject of a Tate Gallery retrospective. In 2007, London's National Gallery held an exhibition of Kossoff's work entitled "Leon Kossoff: Drawing from Painting". Kossoff declined appointment as a Commander of the Order of the British Empire. In 2010, Kossoff exhibited a travelling show of new paintings and drawings, beginning at Annely Juda Fine Art, London, then travelling to Mitchell-Innes & Nash, New York, and ending at L.A. Louver, Los Angeles. In 2013–14, Kossoff's urban landscapes were shown in a travelling international exhibition, titled "Leon Kossoff: London Landscapes".

== Death and legacy ==
Kossoff died at the age of 92 on 4 July 2019 from complications of a stroke.

In 2023, Hastings Contemporary organised a two-person exhibition with the work of Chaïm Soutine and Leon Kossoff. In 2024, Kossoff's work was the subject of an exhibition entitled 'Close Encounters: Paintings and Drawings' at Xavier Hufkens.

== Art market ==
His best selling painting in the art market is Children's Swimming Pool, Autumn Afternoon (1971), sold for £5,200,000 ($7,065,012) at Sotheby's London, on 4 March 2026. It surpassed by a large margin the previous record, held by Willesden Junction - Autumn Afternoon (1971), who had sold by £1,388,750 ($1,79 million), at Christie's, on 19 November 2018.
