= Carel Weight =

English painter(1908-1997)

Carel Victor Morlais Weight
- Born: 10 September 1908; Paddington, London
- Died: 13 August 1997 (aged 88); London
- Education: Hammersmith School of Art; Goldsmiths College
- Known for: Landscape & portrait painting

Carel Victor Morlais Weight, CH, CBE, RA (10 September 1908 – 13 August 1997) was an English painter.

== Biography ==
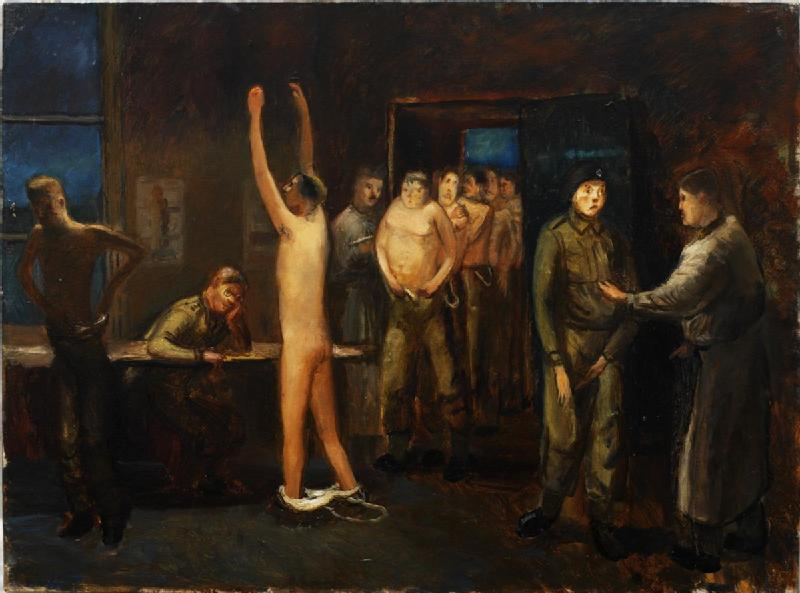
Recruit's Progress - Medical Inspection (1942) by Carel Weight

Weight was born in Paddington in London in 1908. His father was a bank cashier and his mother, who was of Swedish and German descent, was a chiropodist. He studied at the Hammersmith School of Art from 1928 to 1930. At Hammersmith he met Ruskin Spear, who became a lifelong friend. At Goldsmiths College, between 1931 and 1933, Weight developed his preference for imaginative compositions. Teaching at the Beckenham School of Art allowed Weight to support himself throughout the 1930s. His first solo exhibition was held in the Cooling Gallery in 1933 and he later exhibited in some major London galleries and throughout the United Kingdom.

It was at Goldsmith's that Weight met his future wife, the artist Helen Roeder. They were together for 60 years before they married in 1990.

During the Second World War, Weight served with the Royal Engineers and the Army Education Corps. Weight wrote to the War Artists' Advisory Committee, WAAC, in December 1939 seeking work as a war artist. A number of commissions were discussed and eventually, in March 1942, WAAC purchased one picture from Weight. By then he had been called up and his time for painting was restricted. In July 1942 Weight's painting of a zebra that escaped from London Zoo during an air raid was purchased, but his commanding officer would not release him for further WAAC commissions. It was not until the spring of 1945, after Albert Richards had been killed, that WAAC could offer Weight a full-time post. As an official war artist in 1945, he worked in Austria, Greece and Italy. Weight landed in Naples in March 1945 and travelled to Rome, Perugia, Verona, Florence and reached Ravenna in October that year. During November and December 1945 Weight visited Vienna, Rome and Florence and arrived in Athens in February 1946. In Greece and Italy he depicted the immediate aftermath of the war and the role of the British Army in working to restore civil society after the conflict.

In 1947, Weight began teaching at the Royal College of Art, and was professor of painting there from 1957. He retired in 1973. He was elected to the Royal Academy in April 1965, and senior R.A. in 1984.

Weight painted a number of acclaimed portraits, most notably one of Orovida Camille Pissarro, but also of less famous individuals. Many of his paintings showed suburban settings in which unexpected human dramas occurred, some of them humorous and some frightening. Each painting's location was chosen specifically for its abstract structure; the locations were usually actual places, but the figures were imagined and "gr[e]w under the brush". Weight wrote that his art was "concerned with such things as anger, love, hate, fear and loneliness", and said, "for me the acid test of a painting is: will the ordinary chap get anything out of this?" He was prolific, and typically painted 50 paintings in a year.

Weight was an instructor, mentor and good friend to John Bratby and Jean Cooke.

Weight died on 13 August 1997 at the age of 88. Works by Weight are owned by the Tate Gallery, Huddersfield Art Gallery, the Victoria and Albert Museum, the Imperial War Museum and feature in the United Kingdom Government Art Collection.

David Bowie bought and owned Carel Weight's Laertes (1979) as part of his private collection.

Keith Waterhouse uses the strand of sinister suburbia in Weight's work as a metaphor for the narrator's mistress in Waterhouse's 1988 novel "Our Song".

== Awards and honours ==
- 1955 Associate member of the Royal Academy.
- 1962 CBE
- 1965 Full member of the Royal Academy.
- 1982 Honorary Doctorate from Edinburgh University
- 1983 Honorary Doctorate from Heriot-Watt University
- 1984 Senior member of the Royal Academy.
- 1995 Member of the Order of the Companions of Honour
