= Edward Middleditch =

English painter (1923–1987)

Edward Middleditch RA (1923–1987) was an English artist.

He was born in Chelmsford, Essex. In the 1930s his family moved to Nottingham, where he attended the Mundella Grammar School from 1934 to 1939. He then served in the British Army during the Second World War, serving overseas in France, Germany, Burma and West Africa, and being awarded the Military Cross (MC) in 1945. From 1949 to 1952 he attended the Royal College of Art, where his teachers were Ruskin Spear, Carel Weight and John Minton. His fellow students included Derrick Greaves and Jack Smith. Middleditch associated early on with the so-called 'Kitchen Sink' school of realist painters in the 1950s. He held teaching posts at the Chelsea School of Art, Saint Martin's School of Art, and Norwich School of Art (where he became head of fine art).

He was elected a member of the Royal Academy in 1973, later as Keeper of the Royal Academy (in charge of the schools). Middleditch exhibited widely and is represented in major and regional collections in the UK, US, Canada, and Australia.

== Style ==
Middleditch was a painter, draughtsman and printmaker. He drew his motifs from the natural world, including grasses, water, feathers, opening petals and reflections. Gradually shifting observed patterns became fleeting abstracted movements, often caught from water currents and light effects. His later work became much more abstracted, concerned with repeating patterns as if seen from above and filling the picture-frame; drawing influence from kilims and Persian carpets. Middleditch died in 1987 in Chelmsford, Essex.
