= School of London =

20th-century art movement

The School of London was a loose movement of 20th-century painters, based principally in London, who were interested in figurative painting, in contrast to the abstraction, minimalism and conceptualism which were dominant at the time. Painters associated with the School of London included Michael Andrews, Frank Auerbach, Francis Bacon, Anne Dunn, Lucian Freud, David Hockney, Howard Hodgkin, R. B. Kitaj and Leon Kossoff.

The School of London pursued an art focused on a kind of loose figurative form of post-war realism that reflected the people and the world around them. The term resonated regardless of the fact that there was no agreement on what this new figurative painting should look like, since the styles of painting of the group so markedly differed, ranging from the violent brushwork of Bacon and Andrews to the more explicit figuration of the celebrated Freud and Hockney. The common thread that held the London group together was less any form of explicit expression than their shared appreciation for the tradition and history of figurative painting in a time dominated by abstract painting. At the time this new wave of figurative painting was very controversial, running against the dominance of abstraction, minimalism, and conceptualism, violating the sacred hermetic codes that defined these forms of art.

The term School of London was first used in the catalogue for R. B. Kitaj's 1976 Hayward Gallery exhibition, in which Kitaj wrote:

There are artistic personalities in this small island more unique and strong and I think more numerous than anywhere in the world outside America's jolting artistic vigor. There are ten or more people in this town, or not far away, of world class, including my friends of abstract persuasion. In fact I think there is a substantial School of London... If some of the strange and fascinating personalities you may encounter here were given a fraction of the internationalist attention and encouragement reserved in this barren time for provincial and orthodox vanguardism, a School of London might be more real than the one I have construed in my head. A School of real London in England, in Europe ... with potent art lessons for foreigners emerging from this odd old, put upon, very singular place.

== See also ==
- Art of the United Kingdom

== Sources ==
- "Art Term: School of London". tate.org.uk. Tate.
- Calvocoressi, Richard; Long, Philip, eds. (1995). From London: Bacon, Freud, Kossoff, Andrews, Auerbach, Kitaj. London: The British Council in association with the Scottish National Gallery of Modern Art. ISBN 0863552889.
- Hicks, Alistair (1989). The School of London: The Resurgence of Contemporary Painting. Oxford: Phaidon. ISBN 0714825115.
- Human Clay, An Exhibition Selected by R. B. Kitaj (exhibition catalogue). Arts Council, Hayward Gallery London. 1976.
- Riding, Alan (25 September 1995). "The School of London, Mordantly Messy as Ever". The New York Times. p. C11.
