= Monika Correa =

Indian textile artist (born 1938)

- Born: 1938 (age 87–88); Bombay Presidency, British India
- Occupation: Textile artist
- Known for: Experimental weaves
- Spouse: Charles Correa (m. 1961; died 2015)
- Children: 2
- Website: monikacorrea.com

Monika Correa (née Sequeira; born 1938) is an Indian textile artist known for her experimental weaves. She is largely a self-taught weaver which has allowed her to break free from the inhibitions of an academically trained artist and explore the possibility of textile as a medium of art.

Her textile creations are a part of leading collections at the Metropolitan Museum of Art, New York; Museum of Modern Art (MoMA), New York; Minneapolis Institute of Art, Minneapolis and Tate, London to name a few.

== Biography ==
Monika has completed her B.Sc. in Microbiology from St. Xavier's College, Mumbai in 1958. Later, she married the notable Indian architect Charles Correa in 1961. They had two children, Nakul and Nondita.

In 1962, Monika had accompanied her husband when he was called to teach at the Massachusetts Institute of Technology (MIT). En route this trip, they traveled via Helsinki, Finland where she saw the traditional Rya & Ryijy rugs and was thoroughly impressed by them. This sparked Correa's interest and motivated her to learn weaving. Subsequently, in America, she got a chance to meet Marianne Strengell through György Kepes, a painter and professor at MIT. Former had then retired as the head of the textiles department from the Cranbrook Academy of Art. Strengell taught Correa the fundamentals of weaving and gave her a design of the loom when the latter was returning to India.

== Career ==
After Correa returned to India in 1963, she got the loom built for herself according to the design shared by Strengell. She had also told Correa about Nelly Sethna, her former student who also lived in Bombay. Sethna had sent a young weaver to accommodate Correa with the basic setup.

=== Weavers’ Service Center ===
Correa trained for three months between 1964 and 1965 at the Weavers’ Service Center (WSC) in Mumbai. It was a research institute headed by Pupul Jayakar and funded by the Government of India. At the WSC, Correa met Indian modern artists like K. G. Subramanyan and Prabhakar Barwe. At that time, Subramanyan was working on fibre sculptures made of wool which had a deep influence on Correa.

=== Commissions ===
Initially, Correa began making dhurries (floor carpets) which had simple forms of stripes and solid surfaces. However, not impressed by the idea of people walking on the dhurries, she decided to turn her handlooms into a canvas. She gradually moved to create vertical, wall mounted works which made the process of weaving itself visible.

Correa's breakthrough moment came about when she was asked by Pilloo Pochkhanawala to create weaves for Bombay Arts Festival in 1966. Alongside K. G. Subramanyan and Nelly Sethna, Correa created two pieces for the festival – one of which was the work titled 'Original Sin', for which she had used hand-spun wool.

Following the recognition received at this event, bulk of Correa's work came about as exclusive commissions. Some of her creations include weaves for Philip Johnson’s The Four Seasons Restaurant at the Seagram Building in New York and The Constitutional Court of South Africa in Johannesburg among others.

=== Experimentation ===
The innovative aspect of Correa's work has been her re-structuring of the reed used for weaving. With the help of a carpenter, she cut off the top of the reed which consisted of iron filings stuck with tar. This allowed her to screw it on the wooden rack of the loom. Being able to unscrew at her will meant that she was able to release the reed according to her requirement. This enabled her to collect the wefts and then, by shifting the reed she could displace them slightly, thus allowing a sense of movement within the weave. Correa has applied this technique to her tapestries which make her experimental weaves quite unique and fascinating.

== Notable works ==
- Original Sin (1966, 1972)
- Banyan Tree (1984)
- Axis Mundi (1997–99)

== Exhibitions ==
=== Solo exhibitions ===
- 2019 - Woven at Frieze London, Jhaveri Contemporary
- 2014 - Echoes in Fiber: The Textile Art of Monika Correa, Pucker Gallery, Boston
- 2013 - Meandering Warps, Chemould Prescott Road, Mumbai

=== Group exhibitions ===
- 2019 - Taking a Thread for a Walk, Museum of Modern Art, New York
- 2016 - Rewind, Dhaka Art Summit, Dhaka
- 2015 - Approaching Abstraction, Jhaveri Contemporary, Mumbai
