= Barwe =

Barwe may refer to:

- Barwe language, Zimbabwe
- Prabhakar Barwe, Indian painter
- Kingdom of Barue, precolonial state in Zimbabwe
