= National Handicrafts and Handlooms Museum =

Crafts museum in New Delhi, India

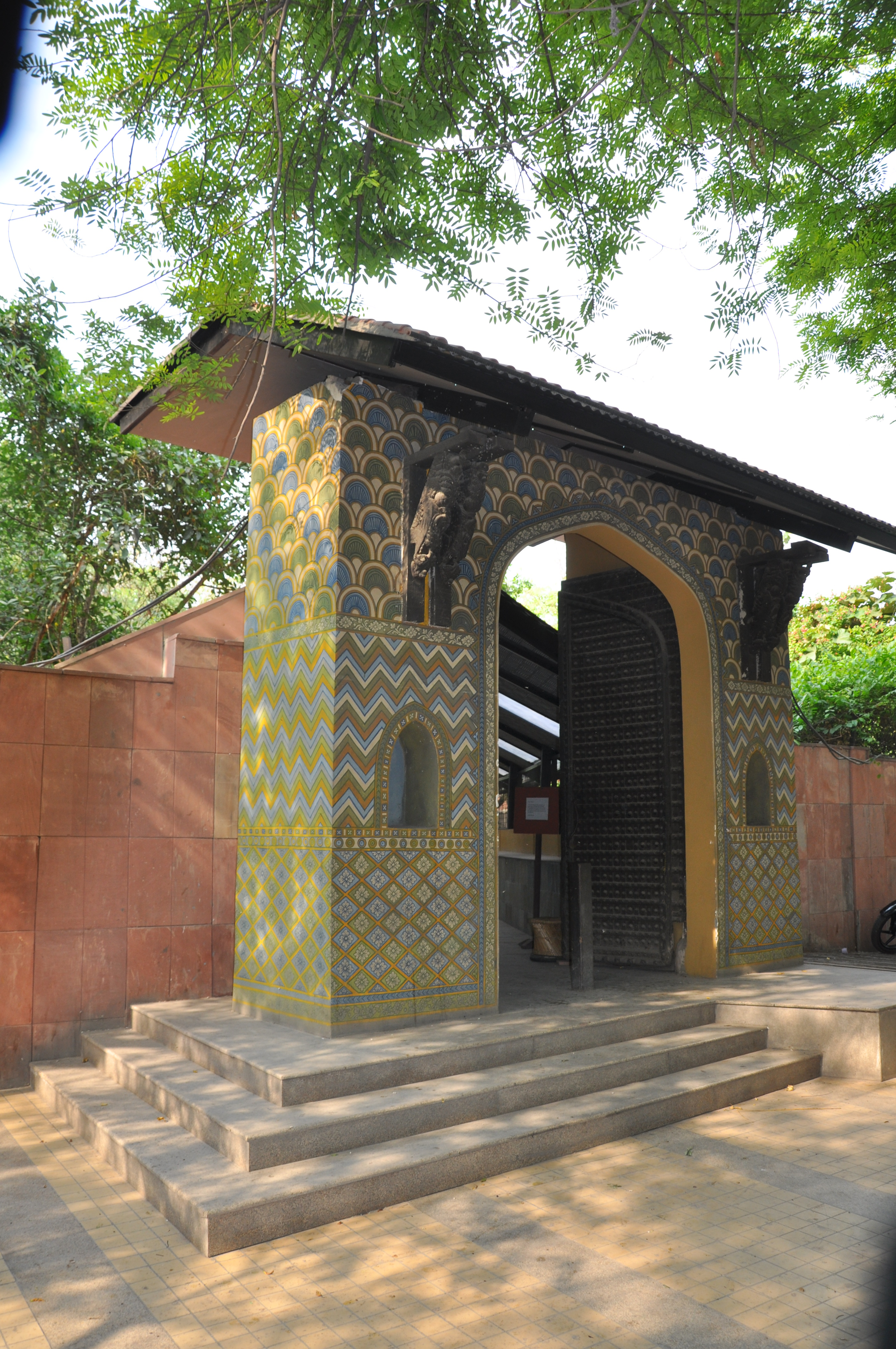
- Established: 1956
- Location: Pragati Maidan, Bhairon Road; New Delhi, India
- Coordinates: 28.613551°N 77.24232°E
- Website: nationalcraftsmuseum.nic.in/

The National Handicrafts and Handlooms Museum (NHHM) commonly known as National Crafts Museum in New Delhi is one of the largest crafts museums in India. It is run by the Ministry of Textiles, Government of India. The museum is situated on the corner of the Pragati Maidan, facing the Purana Quila complex. In 2015, the Government of India announced that a Hastkala (handicrafts) Academy would be established in the museum premises, converting some galleries into classrooms. Initial renovations destroyed one of the museum's most well-known artifacts, a room of murals painted by Madhubani artist Ganga Devi, leading to widespread criticism. As of 2019, renovations are still ongoing.

== History ==
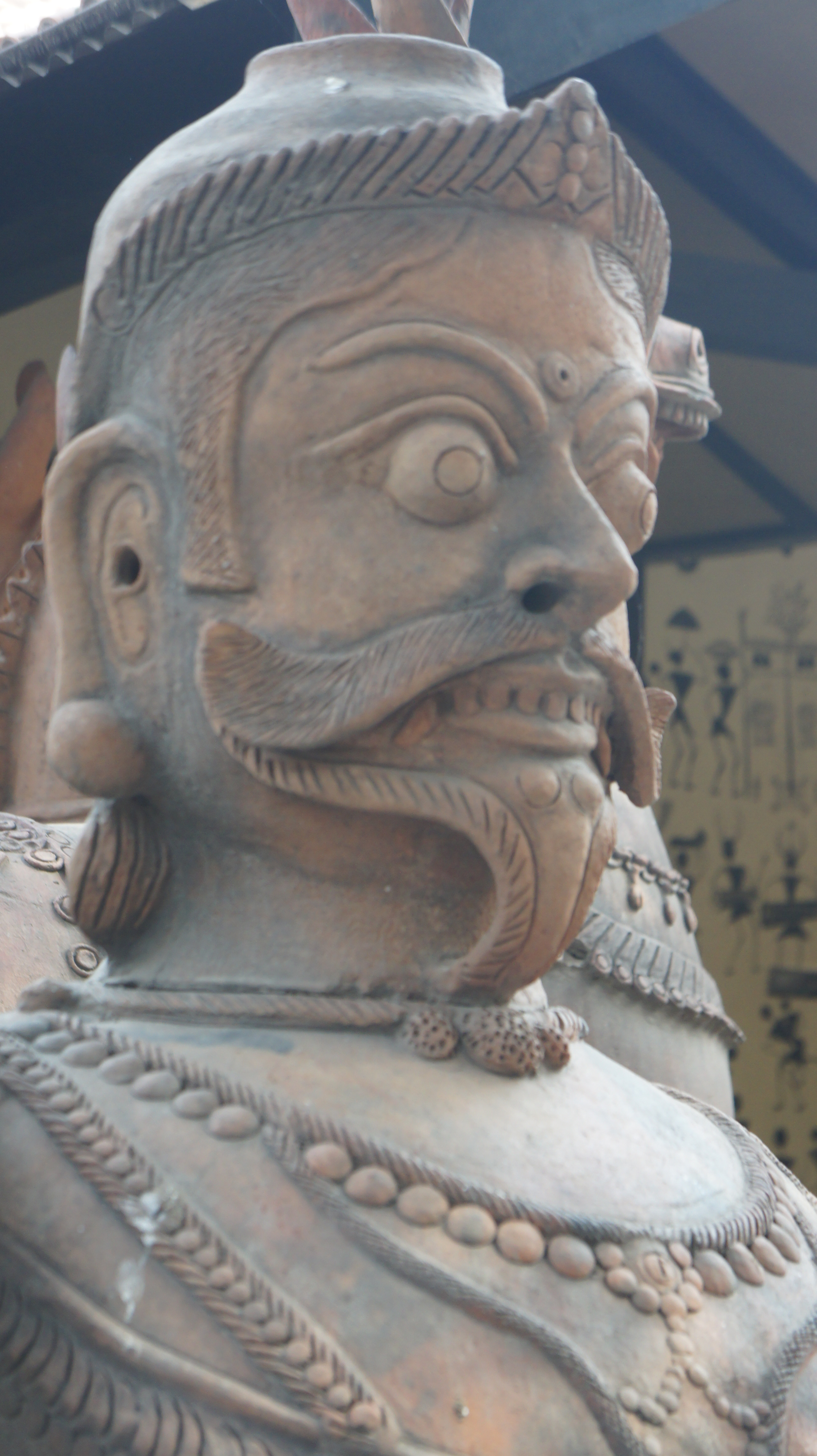
Terracotta shrine figure of Aiyanar, who is a male village guardian deity

The Crafts Museum was established in 1956 by the now defunct All India Handicrafts Board. It was set up over a period of 30 years starting in the 1950s and 60s by the efforts of Kamaladevi Chattopadhyay, when the area was envisaged as an ethnographic space where craftsmen from various parts of India would come in to work towards preservation of various traditional arts and crafts. By the 1980s it already had a substantial collection, and in time the museum space gradually evolved and transformed into its present shape.

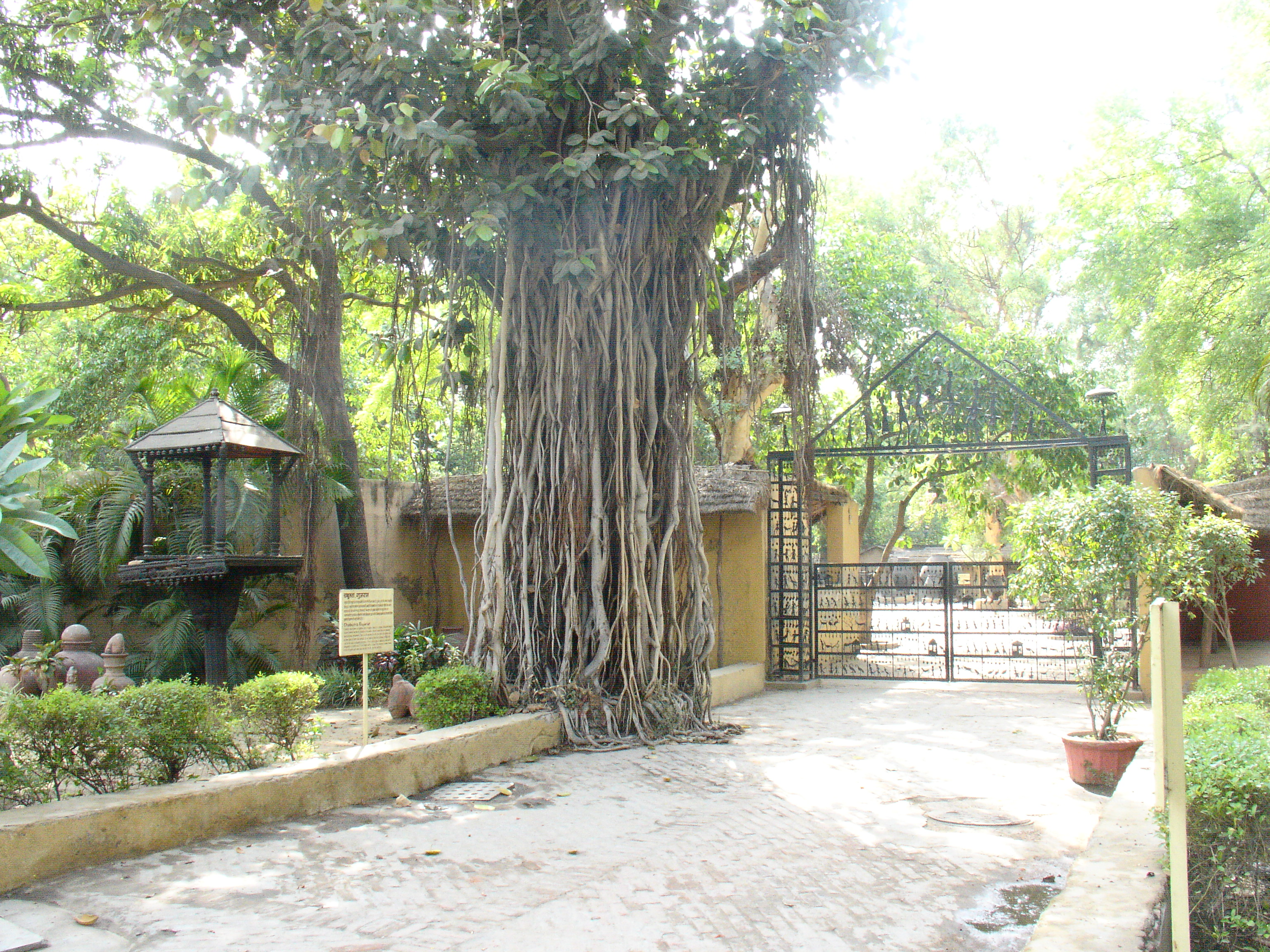
Village Complex Area, Crafts Museum, New Delhi

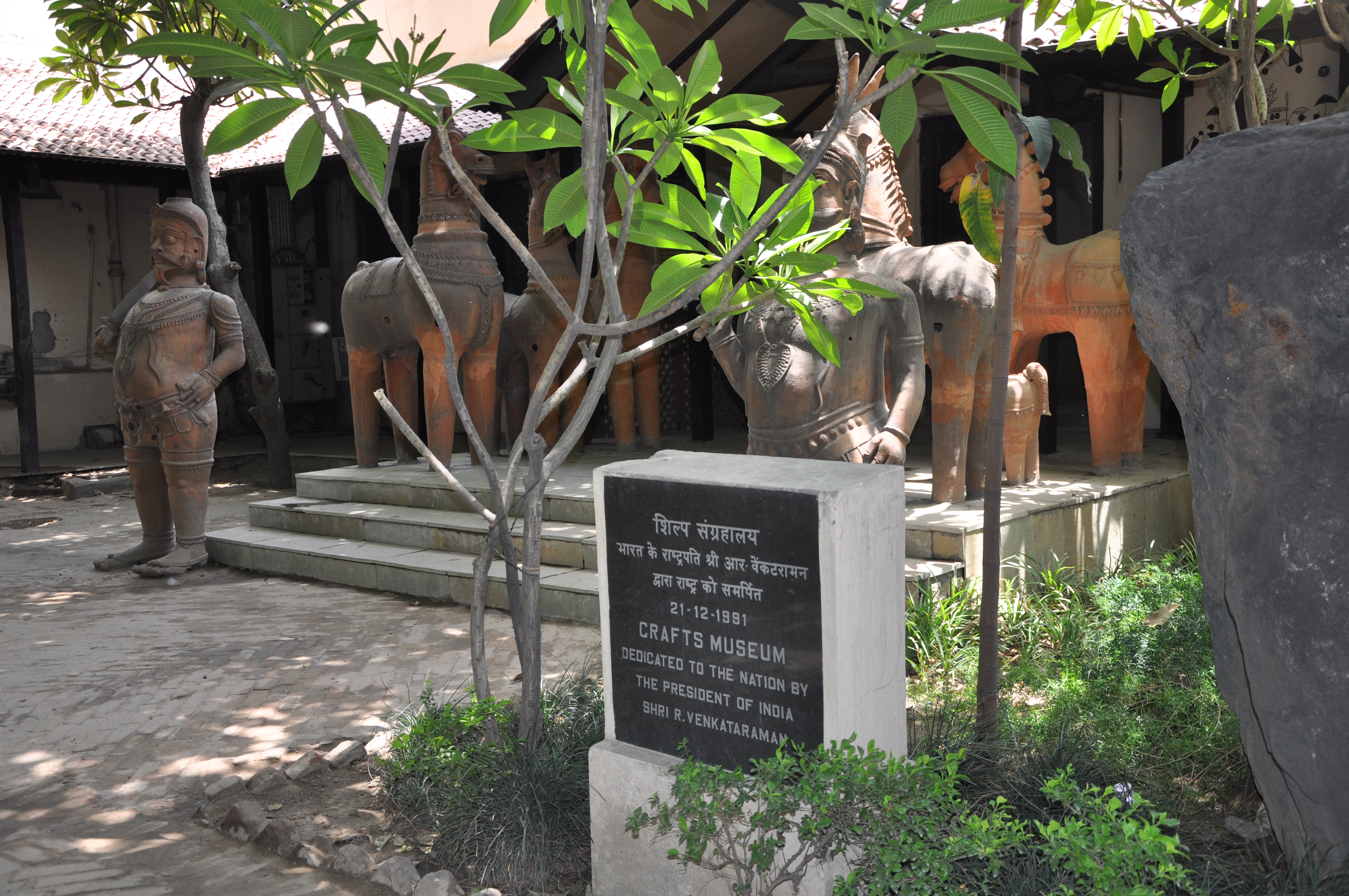
Entrance for Crafts Museum Galleries

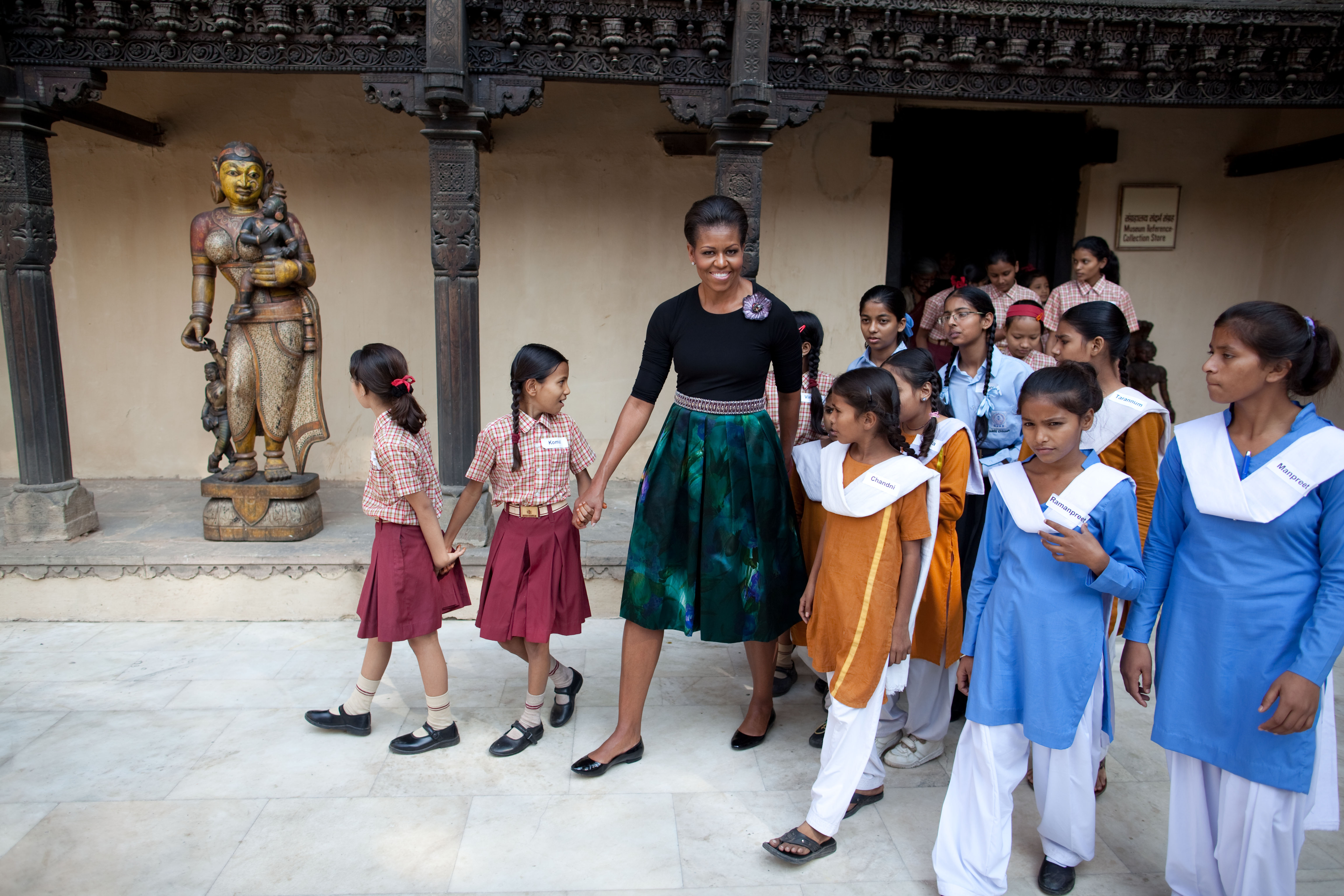
Michelle Obama at National Craft Museum, Delhi, 2010.

Today the museum holds over 35,000 rare and distinctive pieces reflecting the continuing tradition of Indian craftsmen through painting, embroidery, textiles, various crafts of clay, stone and wood, all housed in a building designed between 1975 and 1990 by architect Charles Correa, incorporating traditional architectural vocabulary into a modern design.

== Overview ==
Various galleries within the museum include the Tribal and Rural Craft Gallery, Gallery of Courtly Crafts, Textile Gallery, and Gallery of Popular Culture. Some of its prized collection include, the 250-300-year-old, Bhoota Collection from Karnataka, rare Kashmiri 300-year-old ‘dushalas’, handkerchiefs from Chamba, known for their unique embroidery, rare brocade and Baluchari saris, Kutch embroidery, precious metal jewellery and much more. The museum is popular for an exhaustive collection of textiles. The museum also houses a village complex spread over 5-acre (20,000 m^{2}), with 15 structures representing village dwellings, courtyards and shrines from different states of India, with items of day-to-day life displayed. The entire village complex is a remnant of a temporary exhibition on the theme of rural India, held in 1972. Today several traditional craftsmen in residence at the museum, can be seen working in a designated area within the museum complex, who also sell the crafts they create.

Apart from the collection, the museum houses research and documentation facilities, a reference library, a conservation laboratory, a photo laboratory and an auditorium. It is open from 9.30 am to 5 pm, except on Mondays. It is accessible through Pragati Maidan Delhi Metro Station.

== Renovation and destruction of mural ==
In 2015, the Government of India announced that it would be creating a new Hastkala (handicrafts) Academy to train artisans on the Crafts Museum campus, converting existing galleries into classrooms. Renovations were initiated in 2015. An official from the Ministry of Textiles made an assurance that the establishment of the academy would not result in the closing of the museum, or disturbing any of the museum galleries or exhibits. Despite this, in 2015, renovations at the museum destroyed hand-painted murals by Padma-Shri Award-winning artist Ganga Devi.

In the 1990s, the Crafts Museum commissioned renowned artist and Padma Shri Awardee Ganga Devi to paint the internal walls of a room in the traditional Madhubani style of art. The project, completed over six months, was undertaken while Ganga Devi undertook a residency at the Crafts Museum, while simultaneously being treated for cancer, a year before her death. Her work created a traditional Mithila style kohbar ghar, or a marriage room, decorated with murals. It was the only example of a "complete iconographic rendering of Mithila’s kohbar ghar" in any museum.

In 2015, the Crafts Museum was renovated, and the walls painted by Ganga Devi were completely whitewashed, entirely destroying the hand-painted murals, ostensibly to remedy damage in the walls. The renovation resulted in criticism of the museum's administration, especially by curators who had recently visited the museum and could not confirm significant damage apart from minor chipping. Conservationist Laila Tyabji expressed the view that the murals could have been restored but no efforts had been made to do so. A museum official was quoted as saying "..don't worry, we will get another made" in response to the destruction of the murals.

In 2019, the Government of India's Ministry of Textiles announced that there would be renewed efforts to renovate the museum to make spaces for teaching.

== Building ==
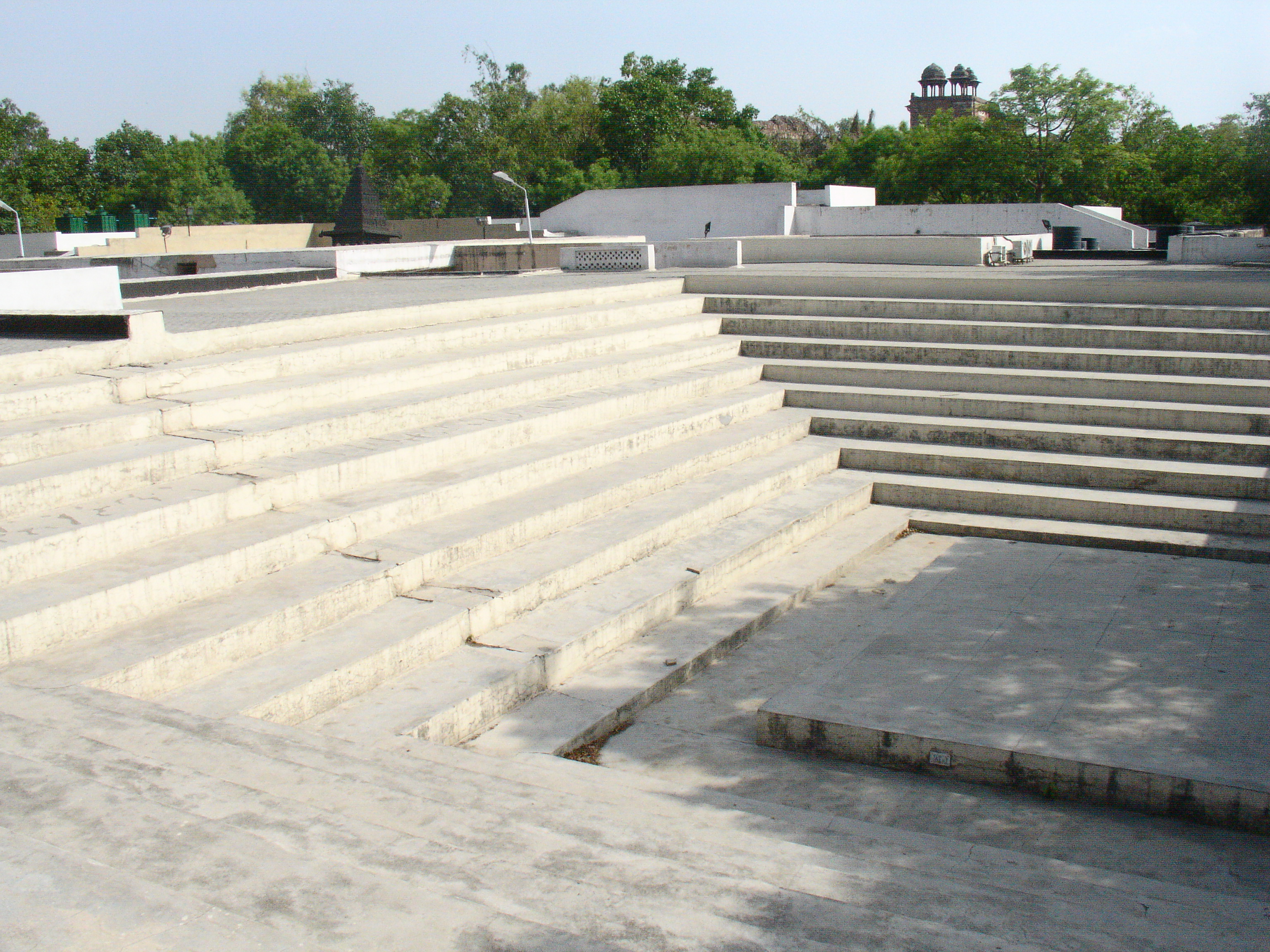
Angan Manch Theatre

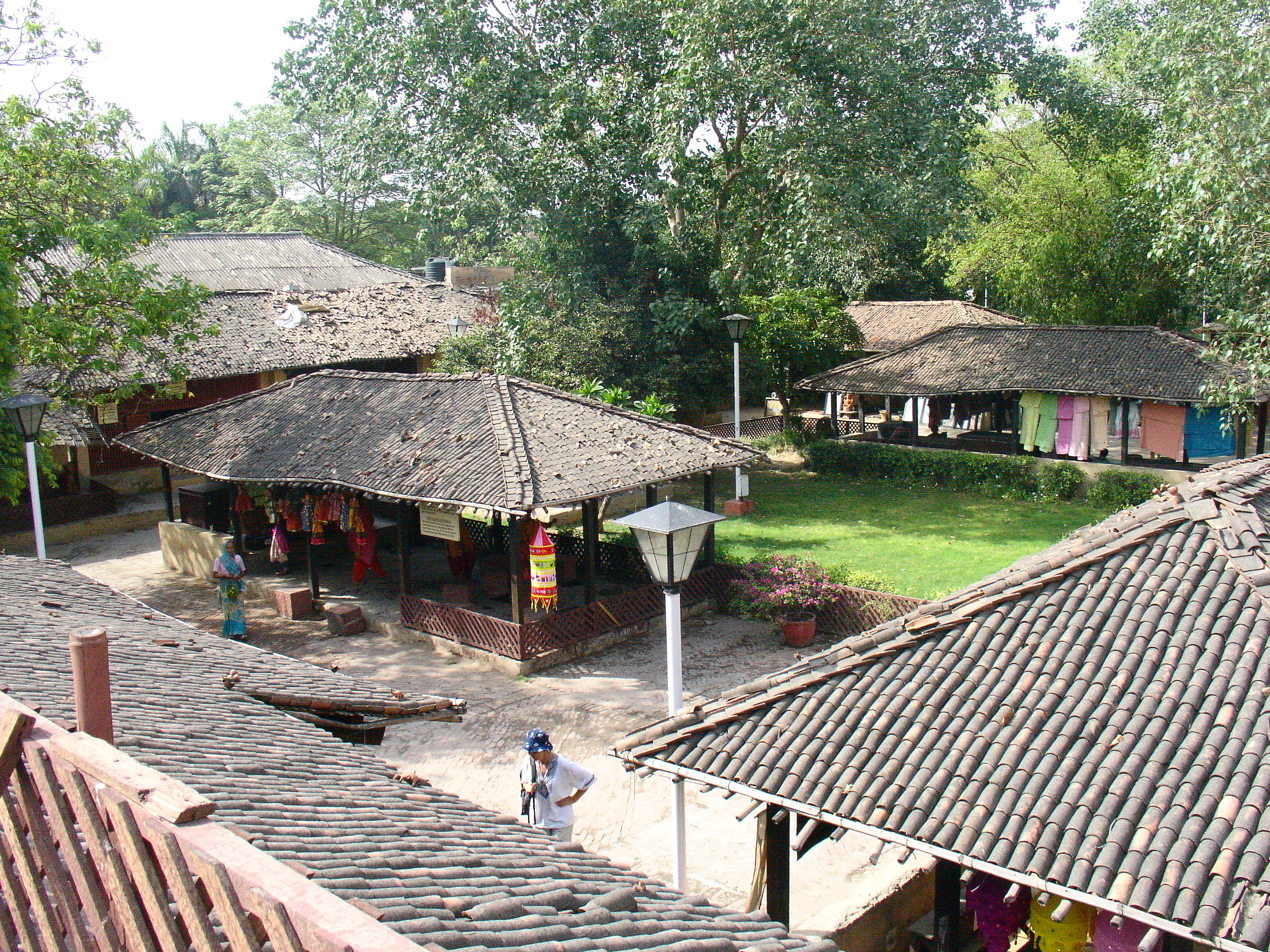
Crafts Demonstration Area

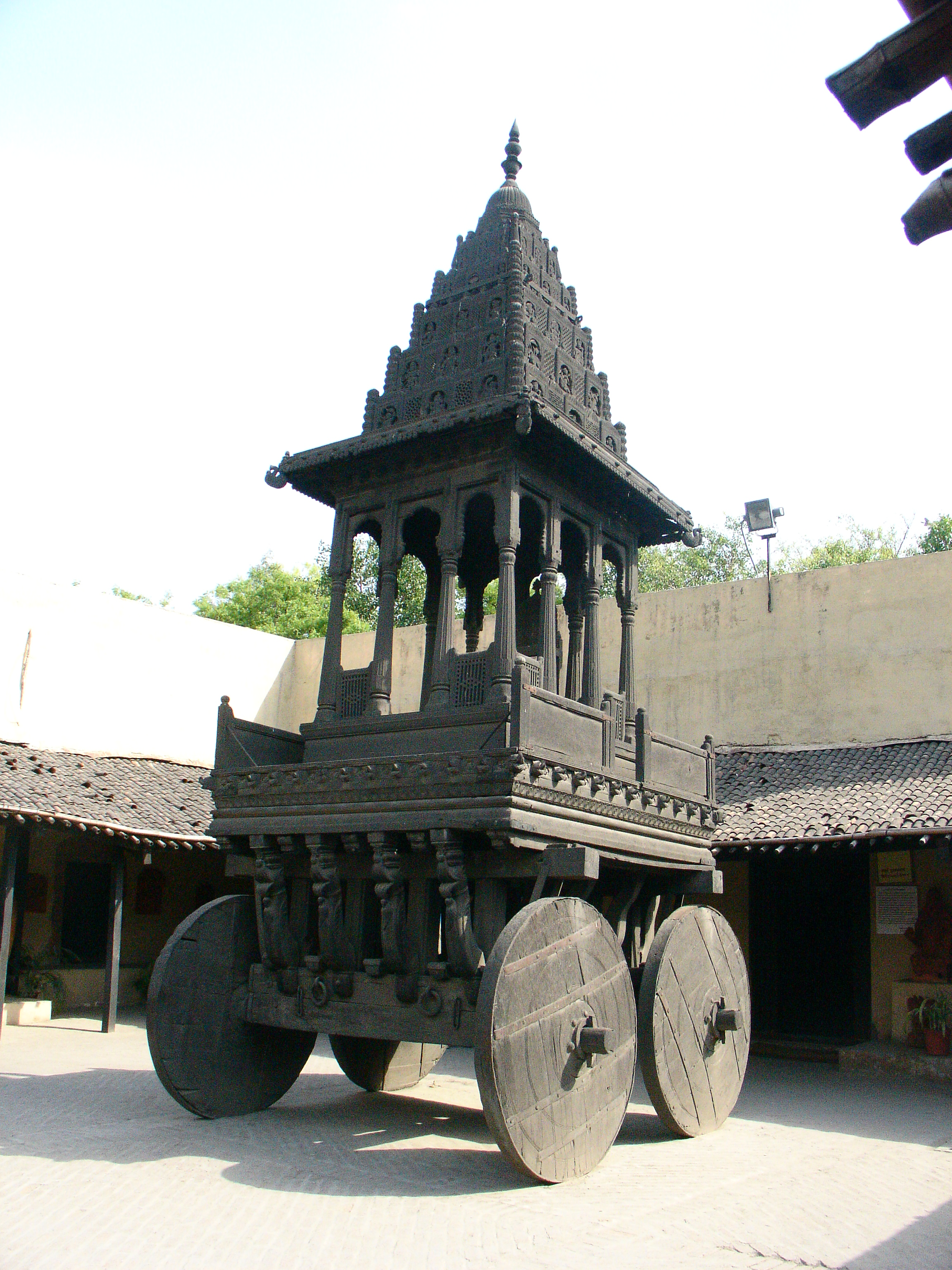
Chariot

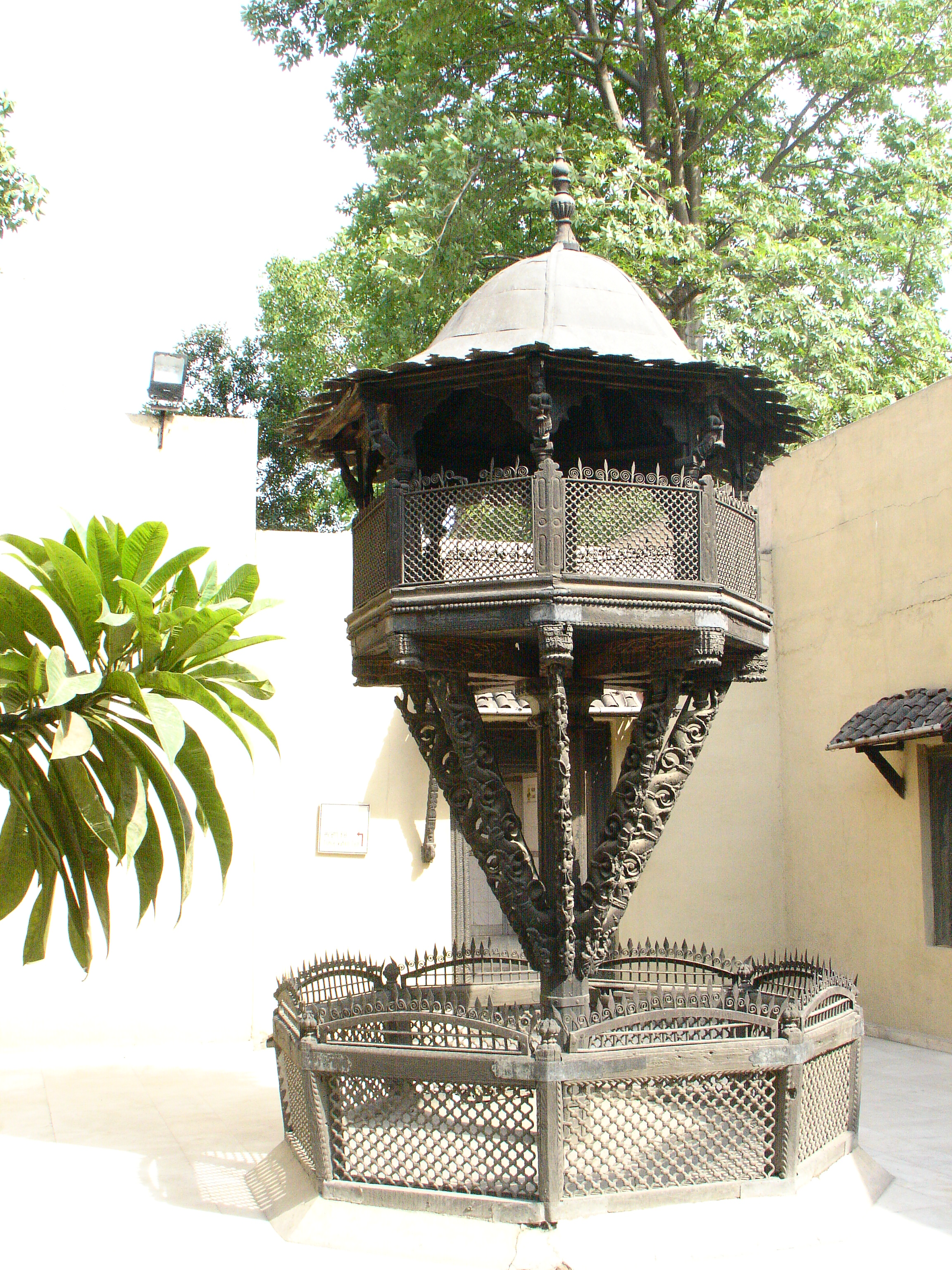
Pigeon House

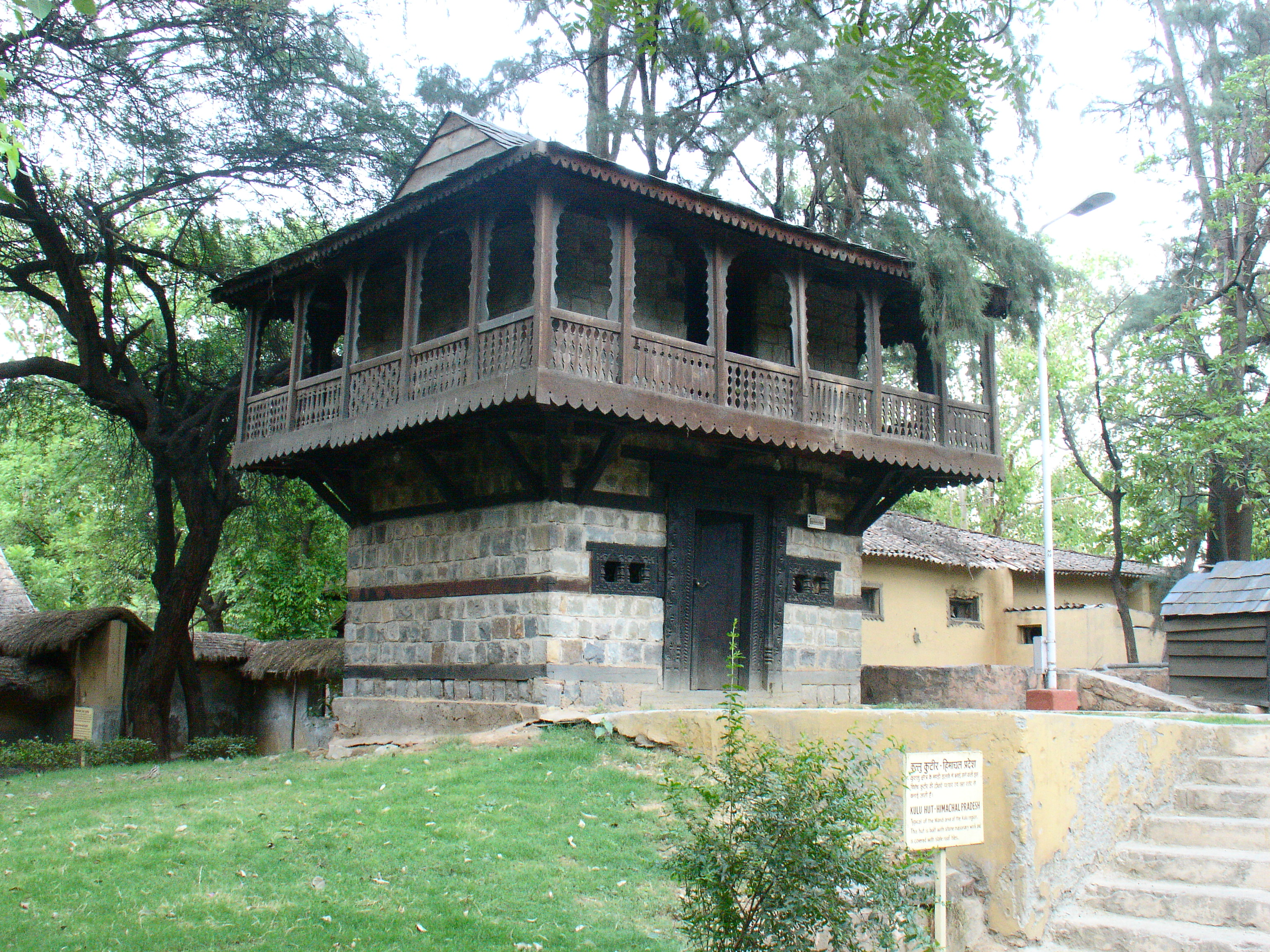
Kullu Hut

== Galleries ==
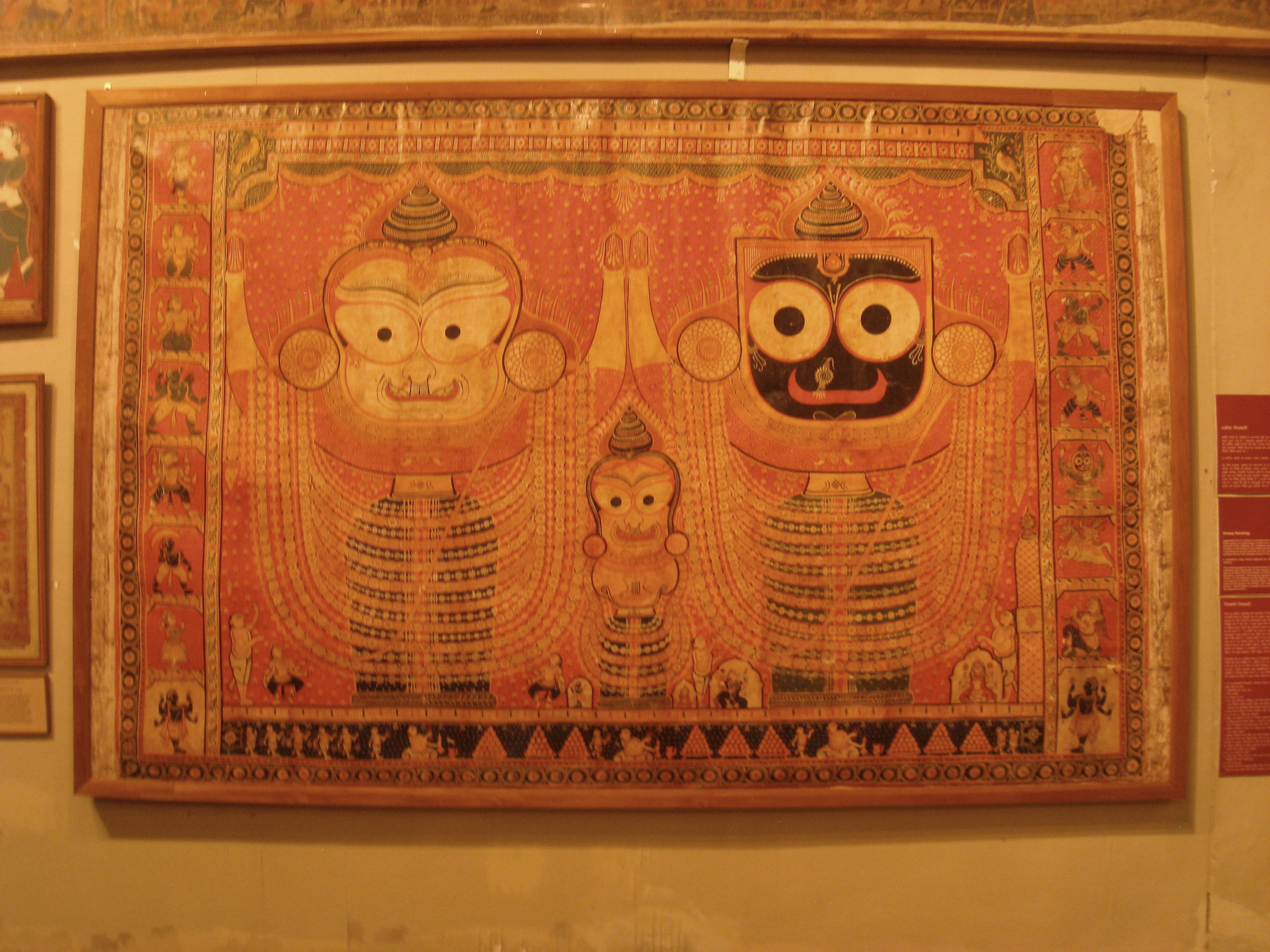
Exhibit in Craft Museum New Delhi

The Crafts Museum has on display part of its permanent collection in its galleries of Bhuta Sculpture Gallery, Tribal & Folk Art, Ritual Craft Gallery, Courtly Craft & Textiles Gallery. The Village Complex also has open walls along the corridors & passages which are used as the canvas to display the painted traditions of several tribes of folk artisans. New folk artists come in every month from different parts of the country to paint on the museum's walls.

=== Paintings ===
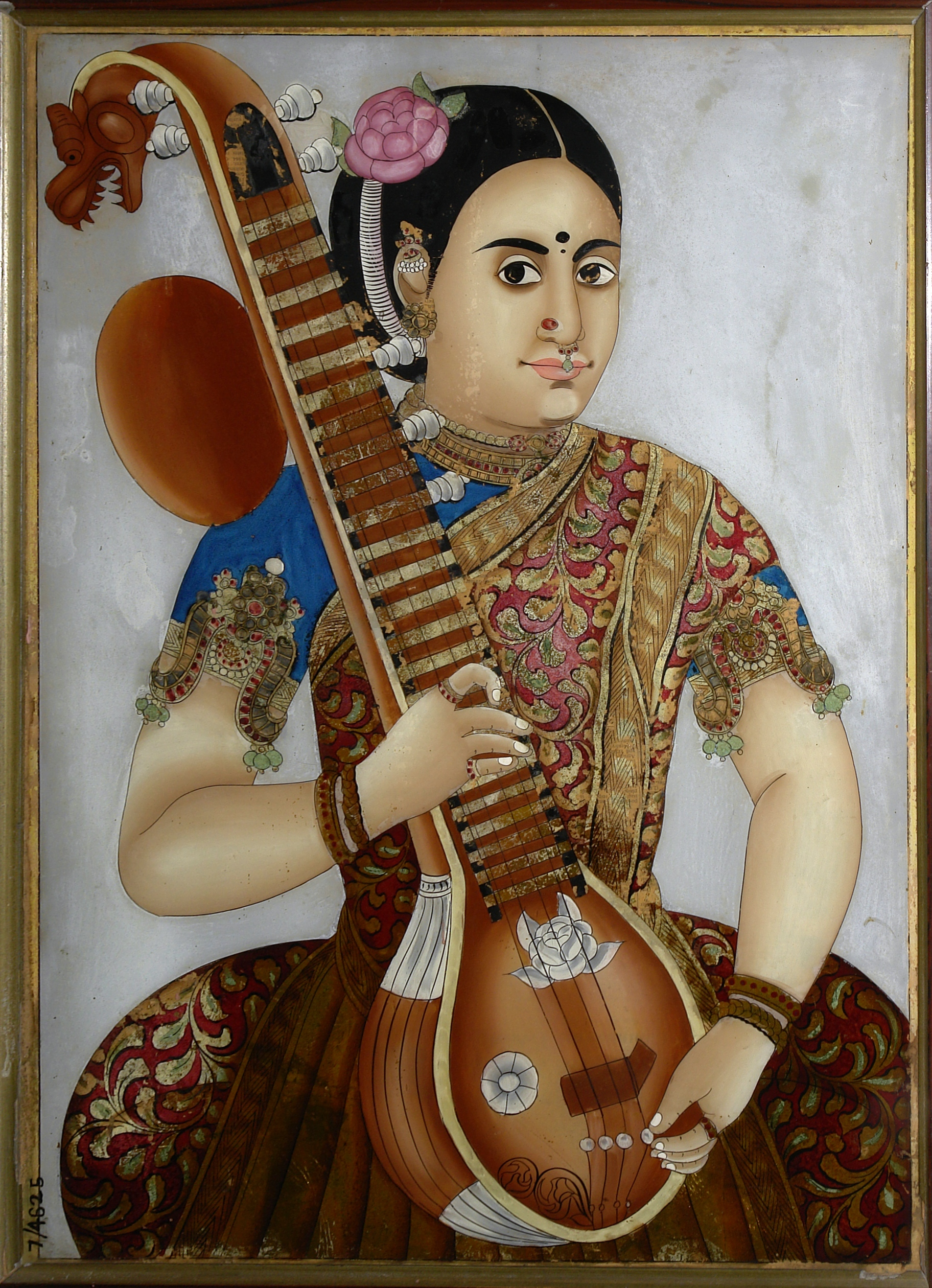
Woman with sitar, Tanjore painting

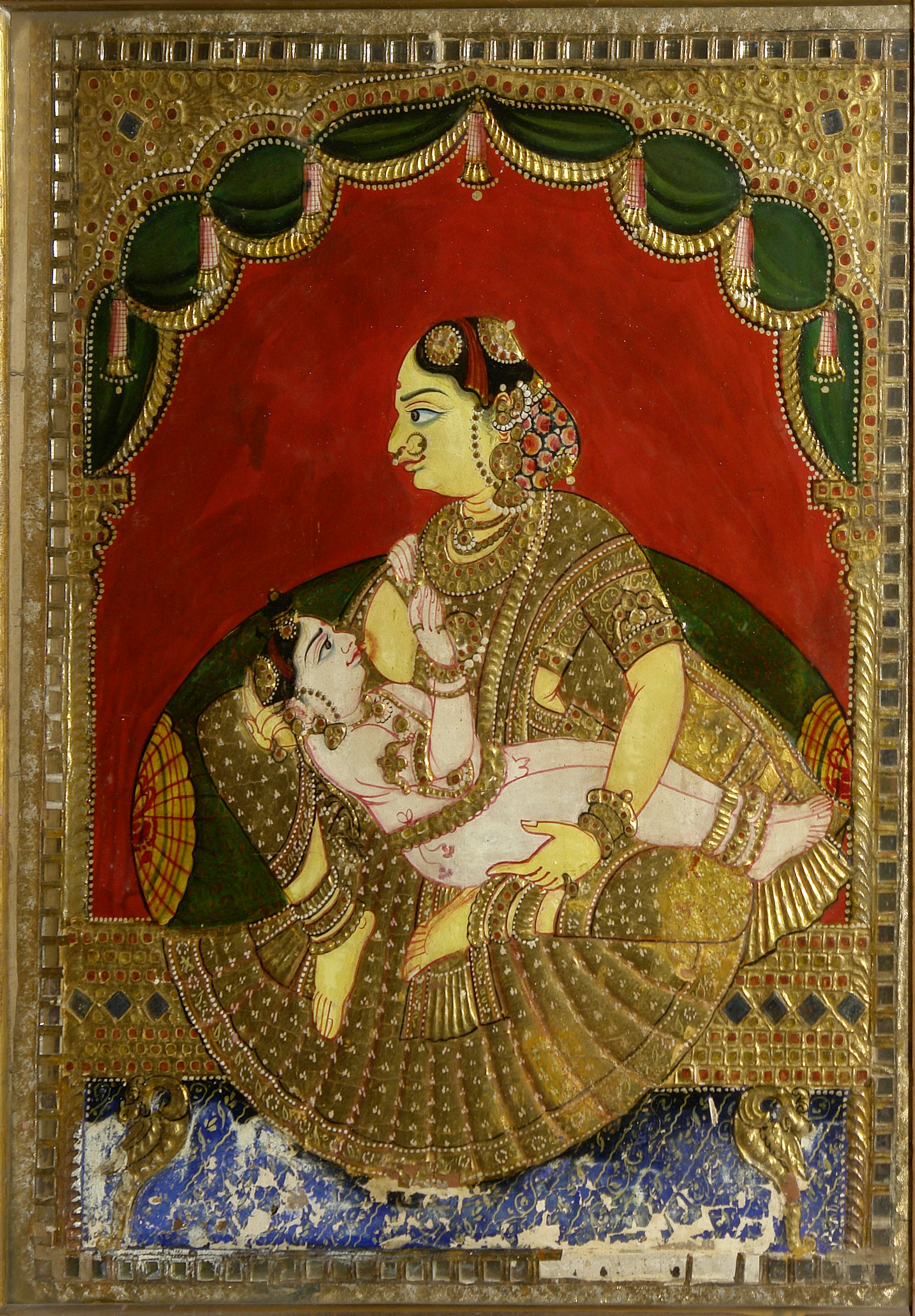
Woman breast-feeding a boy

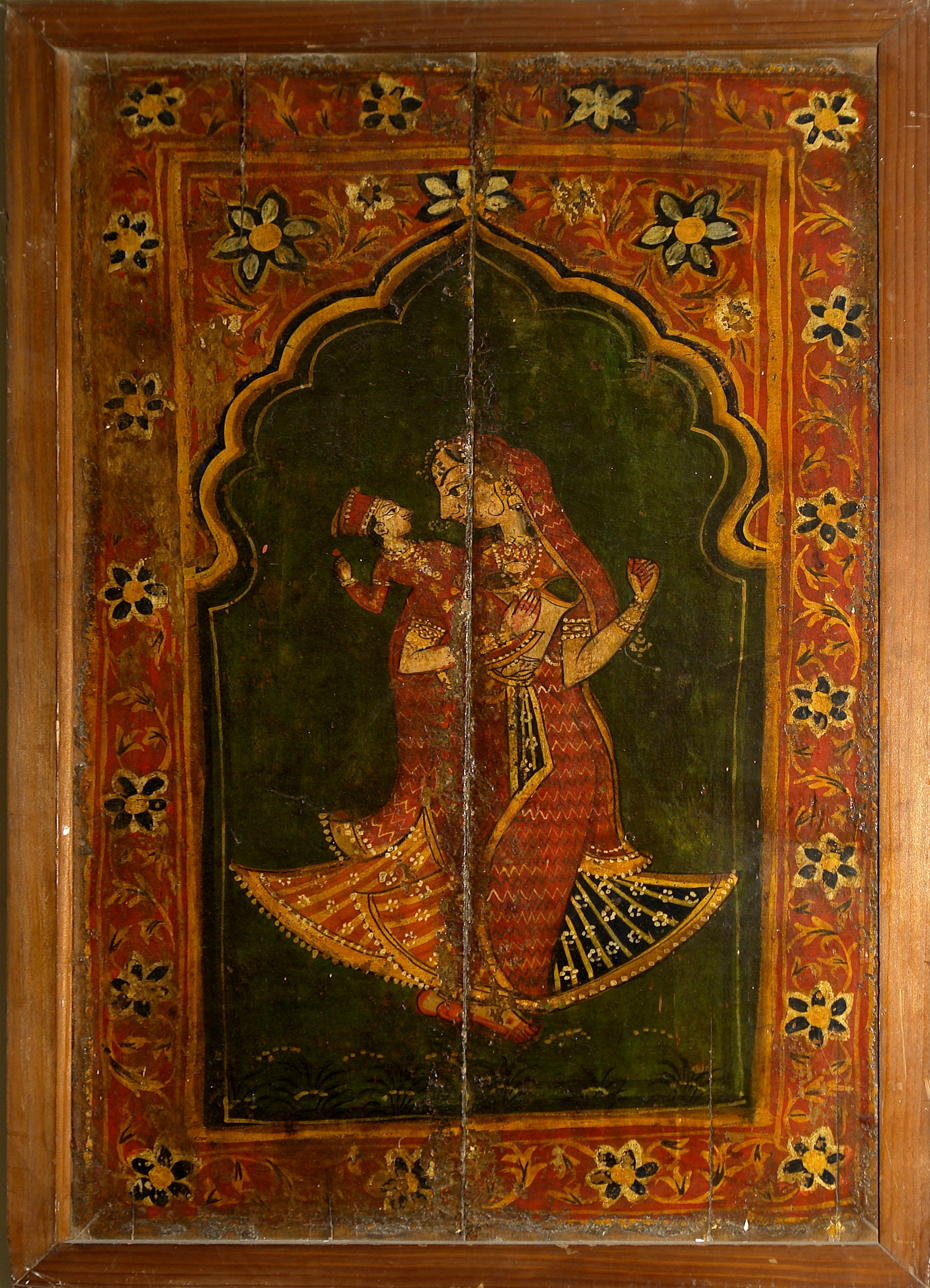
Woman with child, wood painting

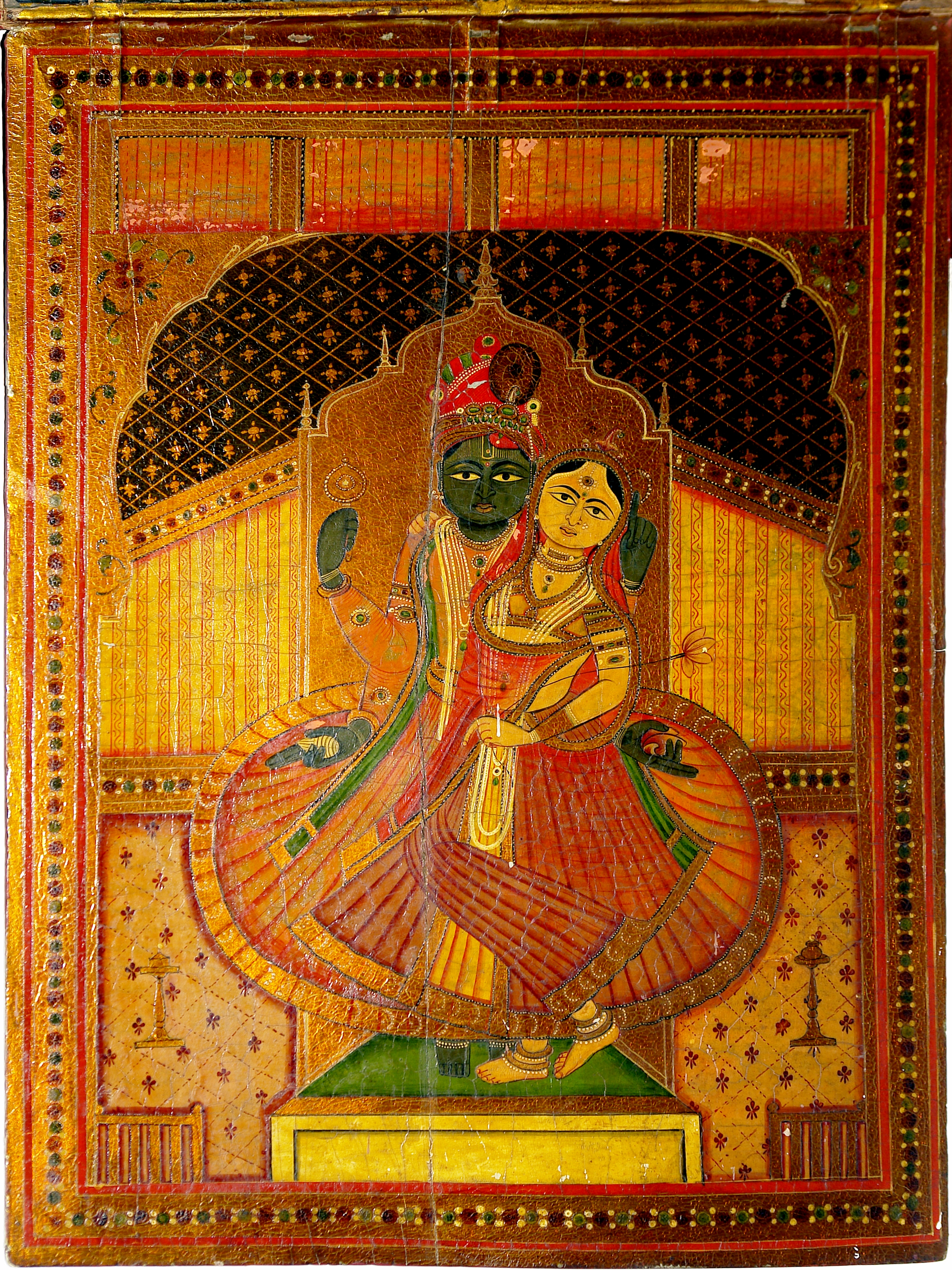
Radha Krishna, wood painting

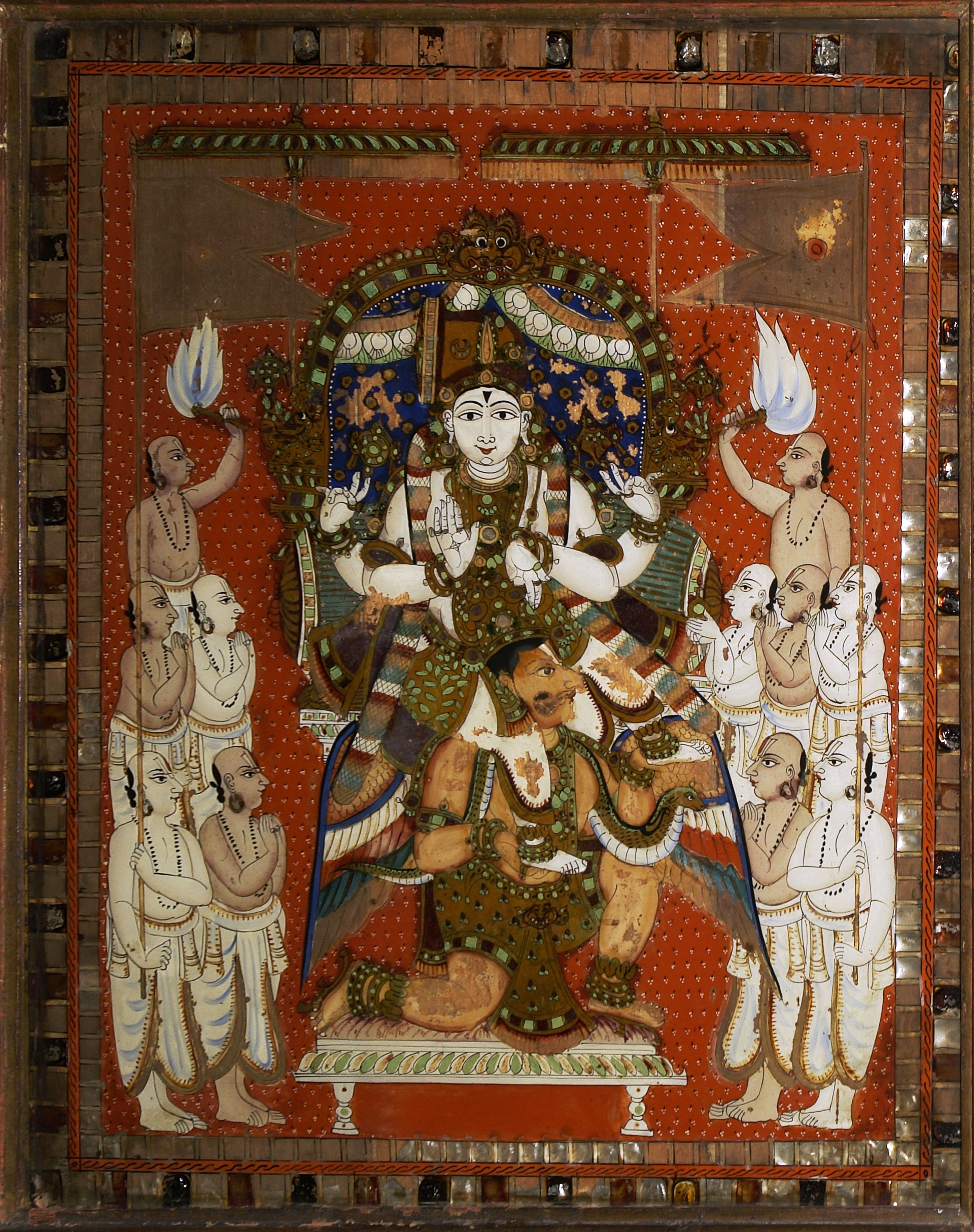
Vishnu, wood painting

=== Bhuta Sculpture Gallery ===
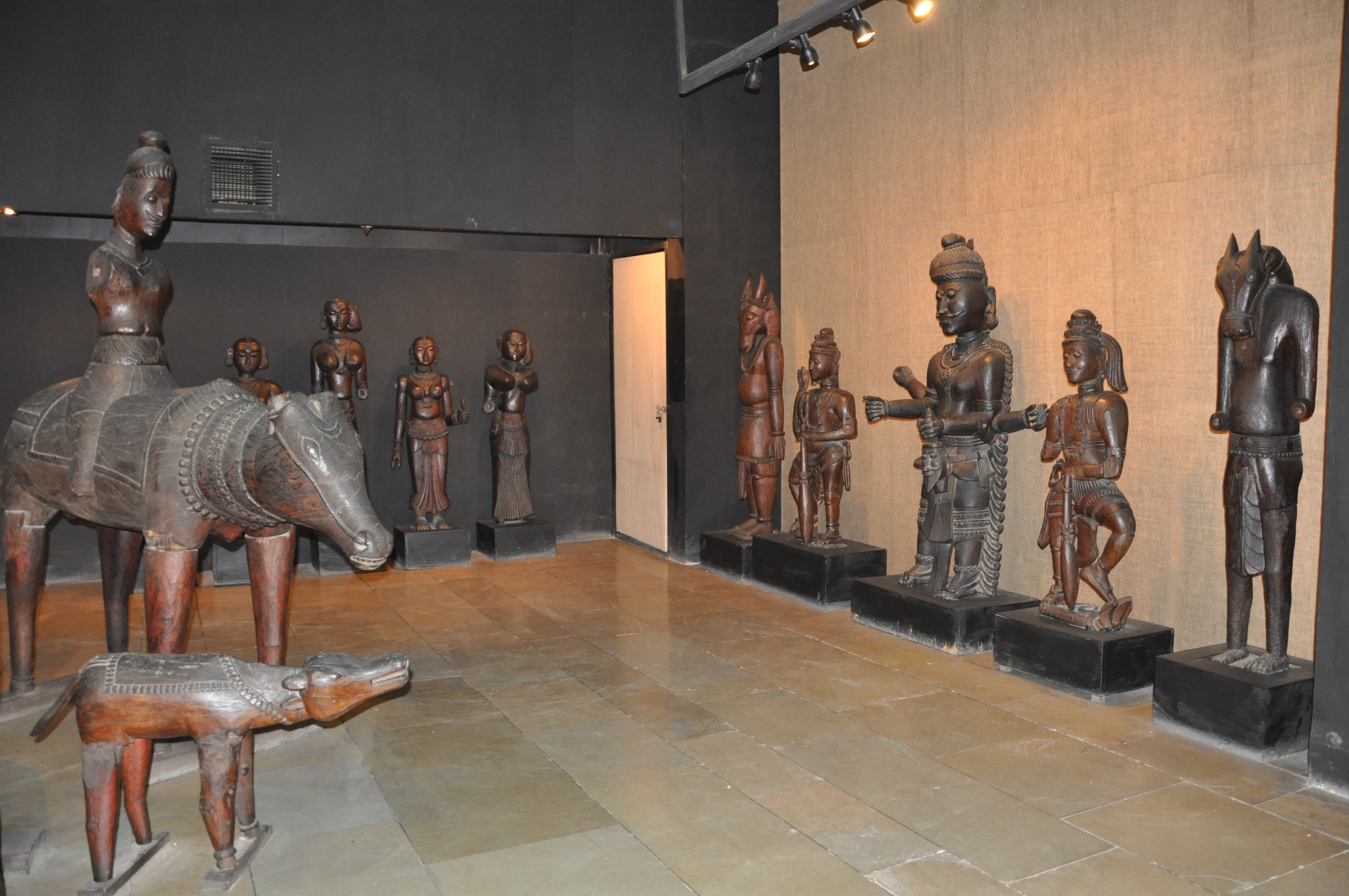
View of the Bhuta Gallery

=== Ritual Craft Gallery ===
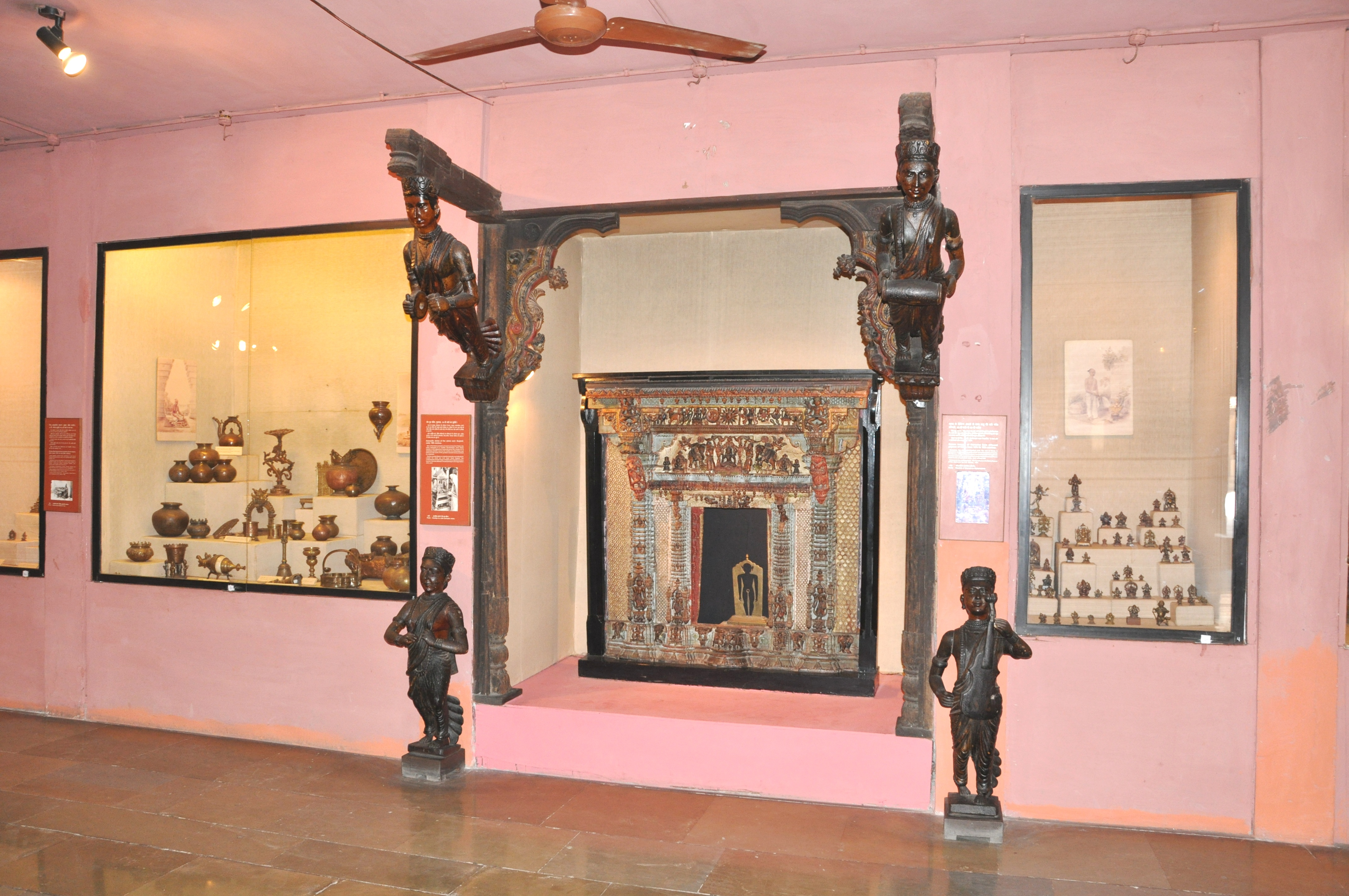
Jain Shrine, Temple Gallery, Crafts Museum

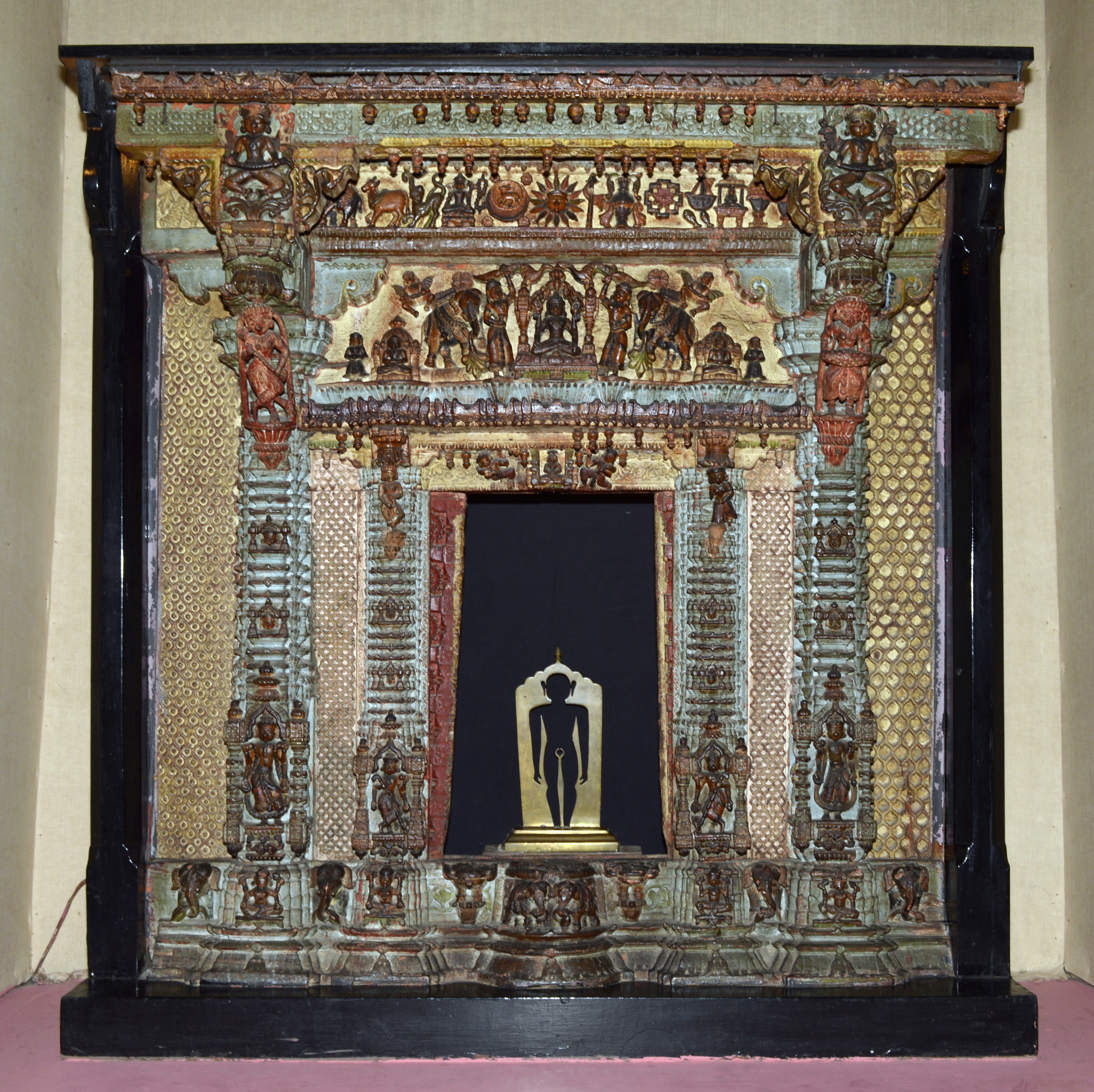
Wooden Jain sculpture

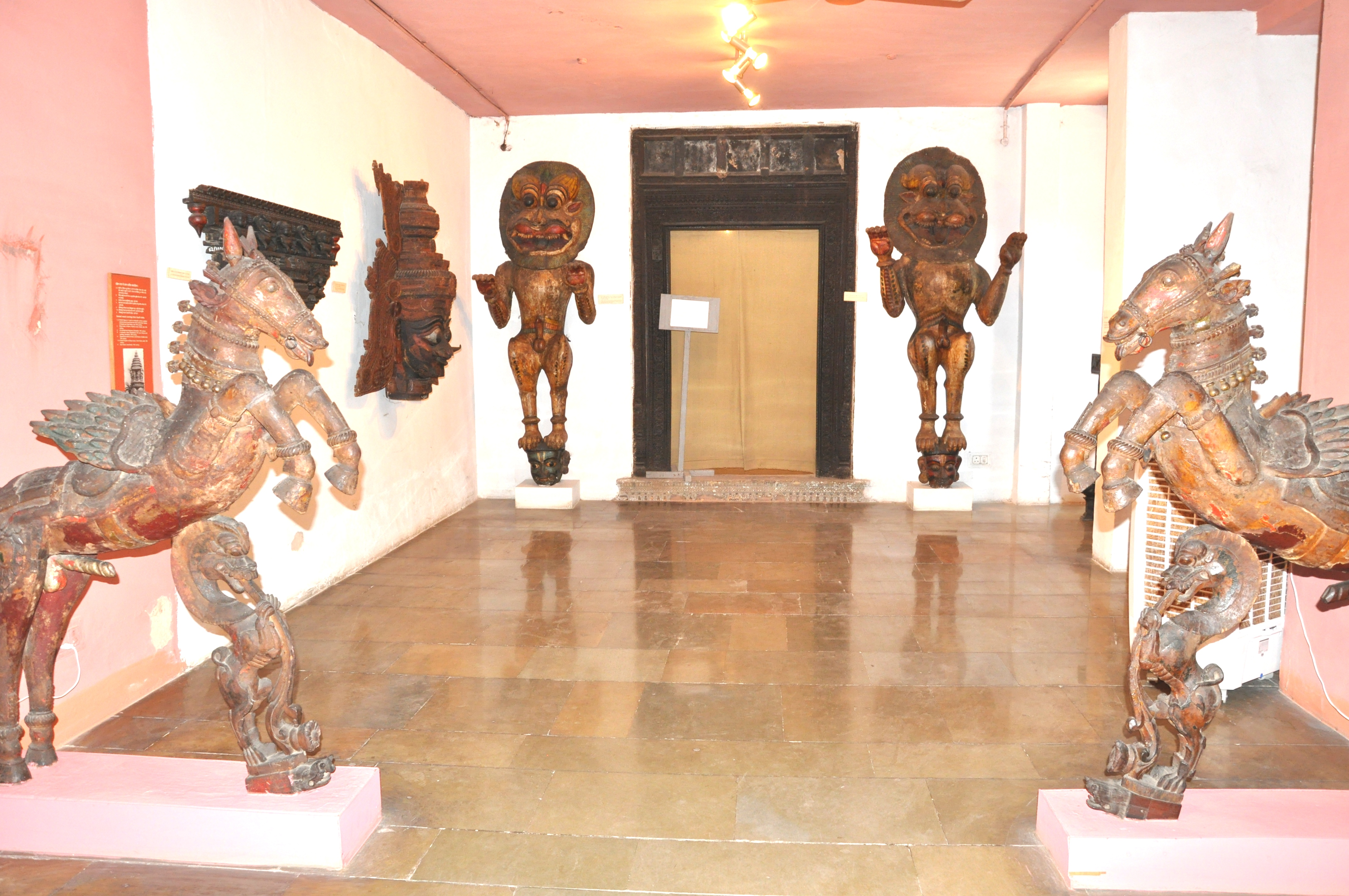
Temple Gallery

=== Courtly Craft Gallery ===
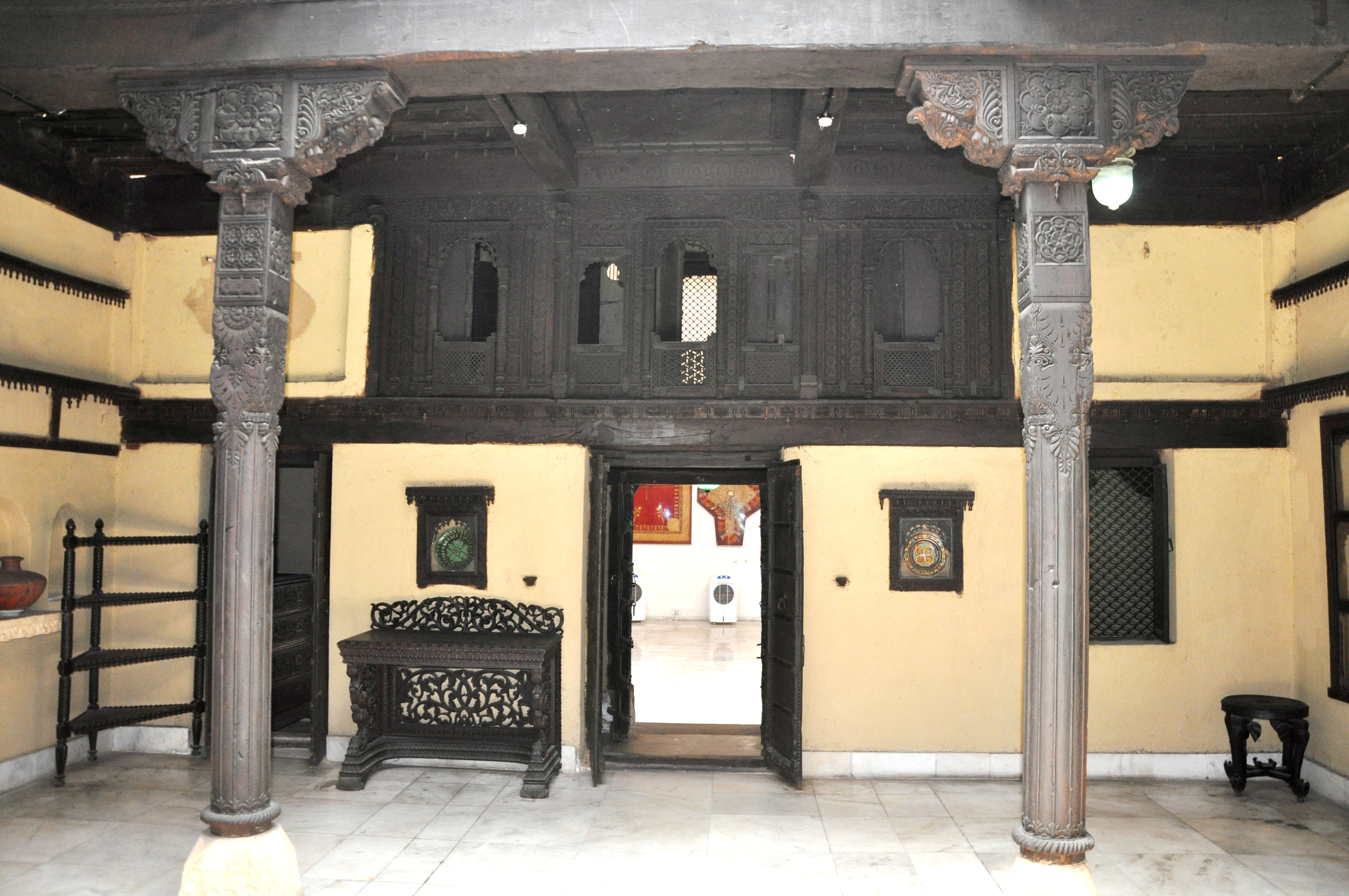
Haweli, Courtly Crafts Gallery, Crafts Museum

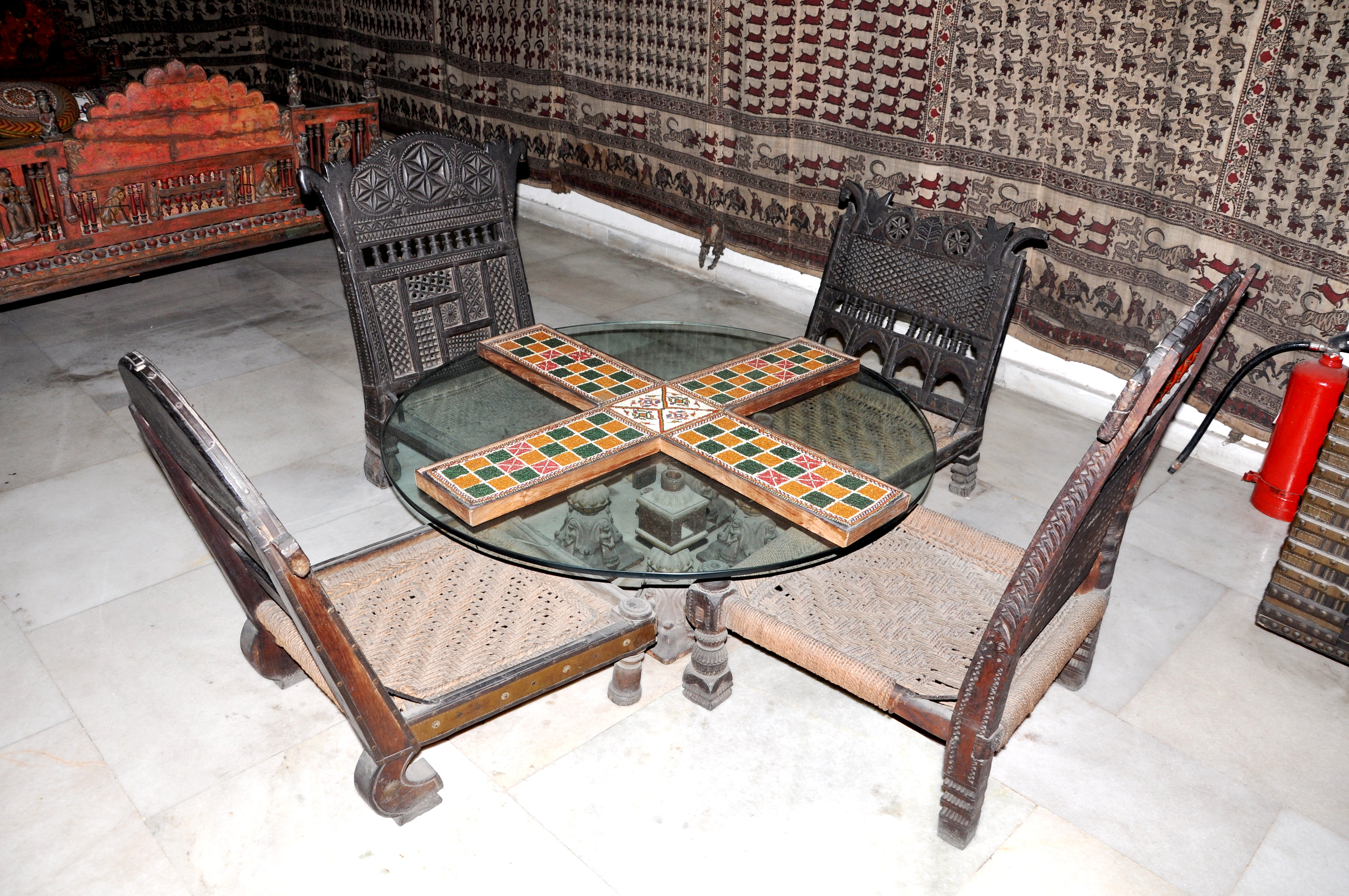
Courtly Crafts Gallery

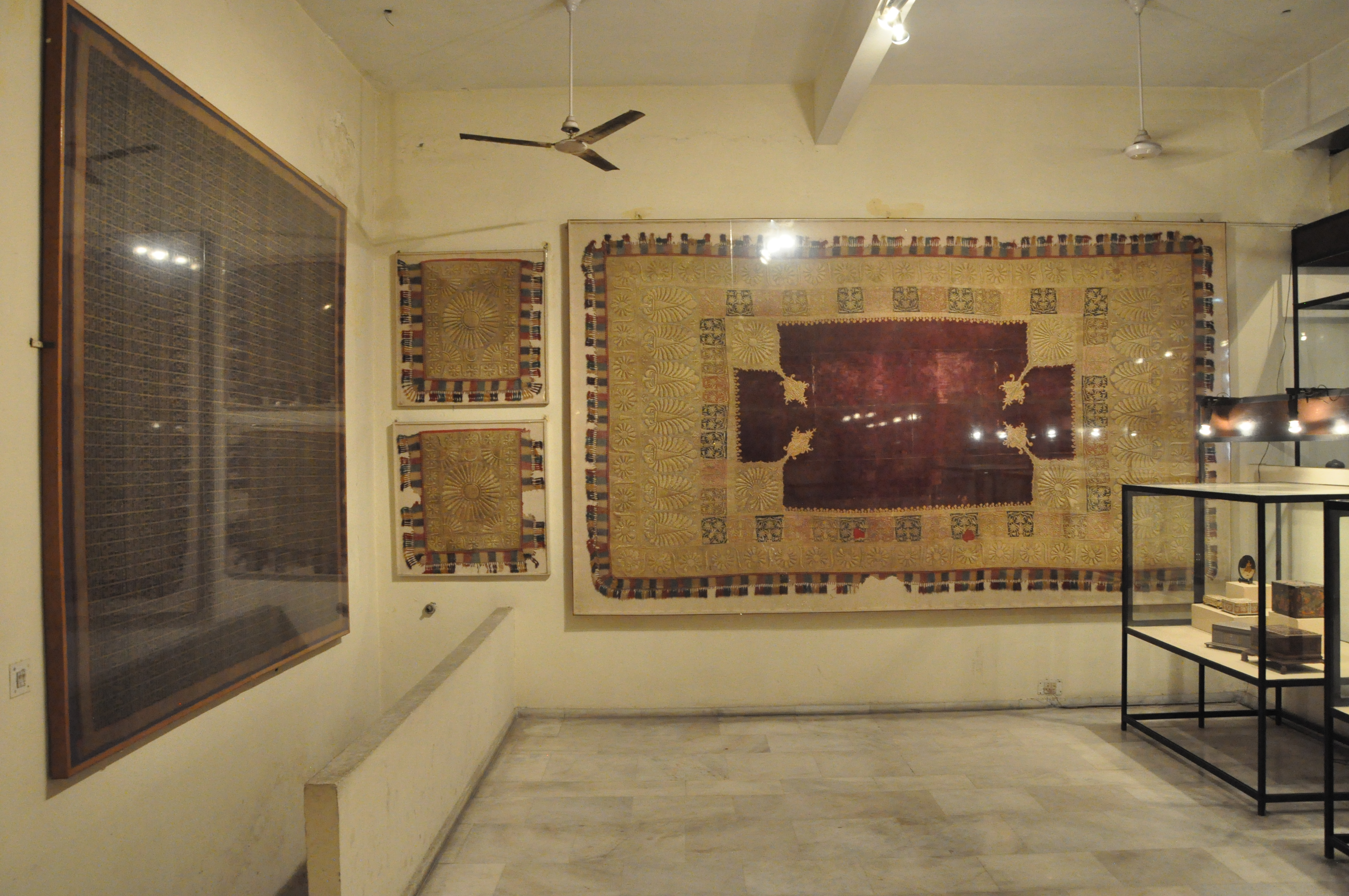
A long view of the Courtly Crafts Gallery

=== Textiles Gallery ===
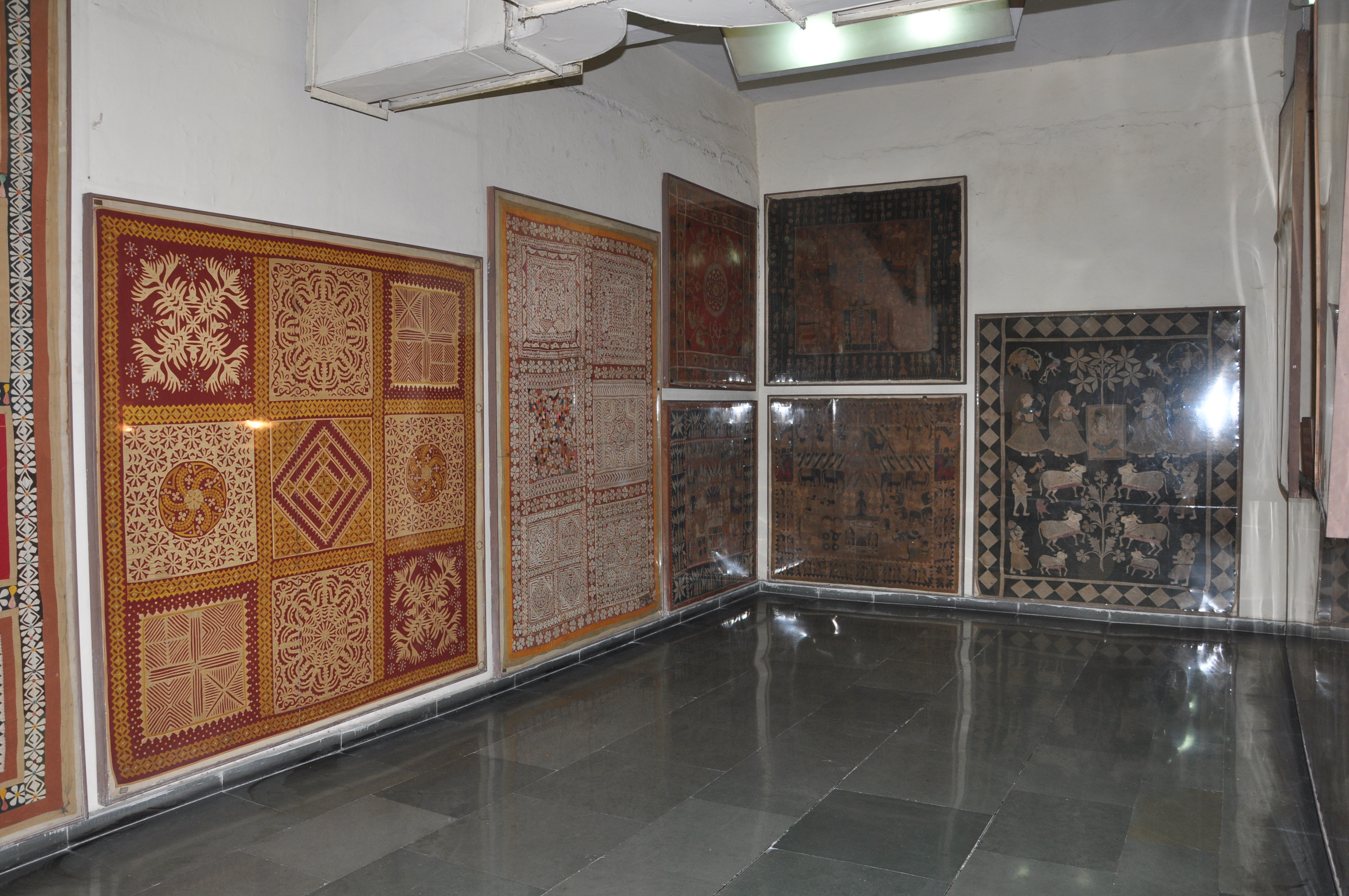
Display of Textiles, Crafts Museum

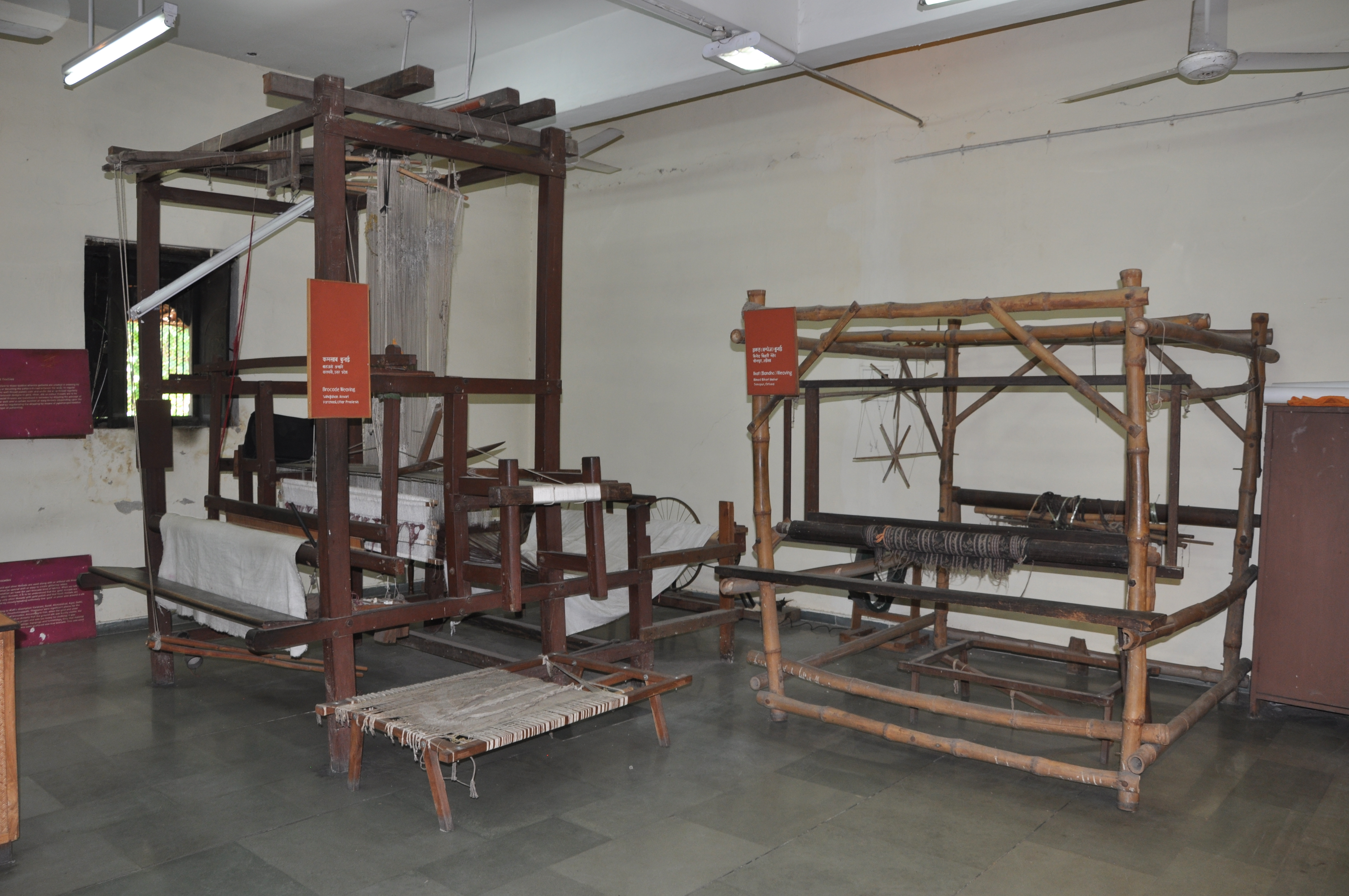
Display of looms in the Textiles Gallery

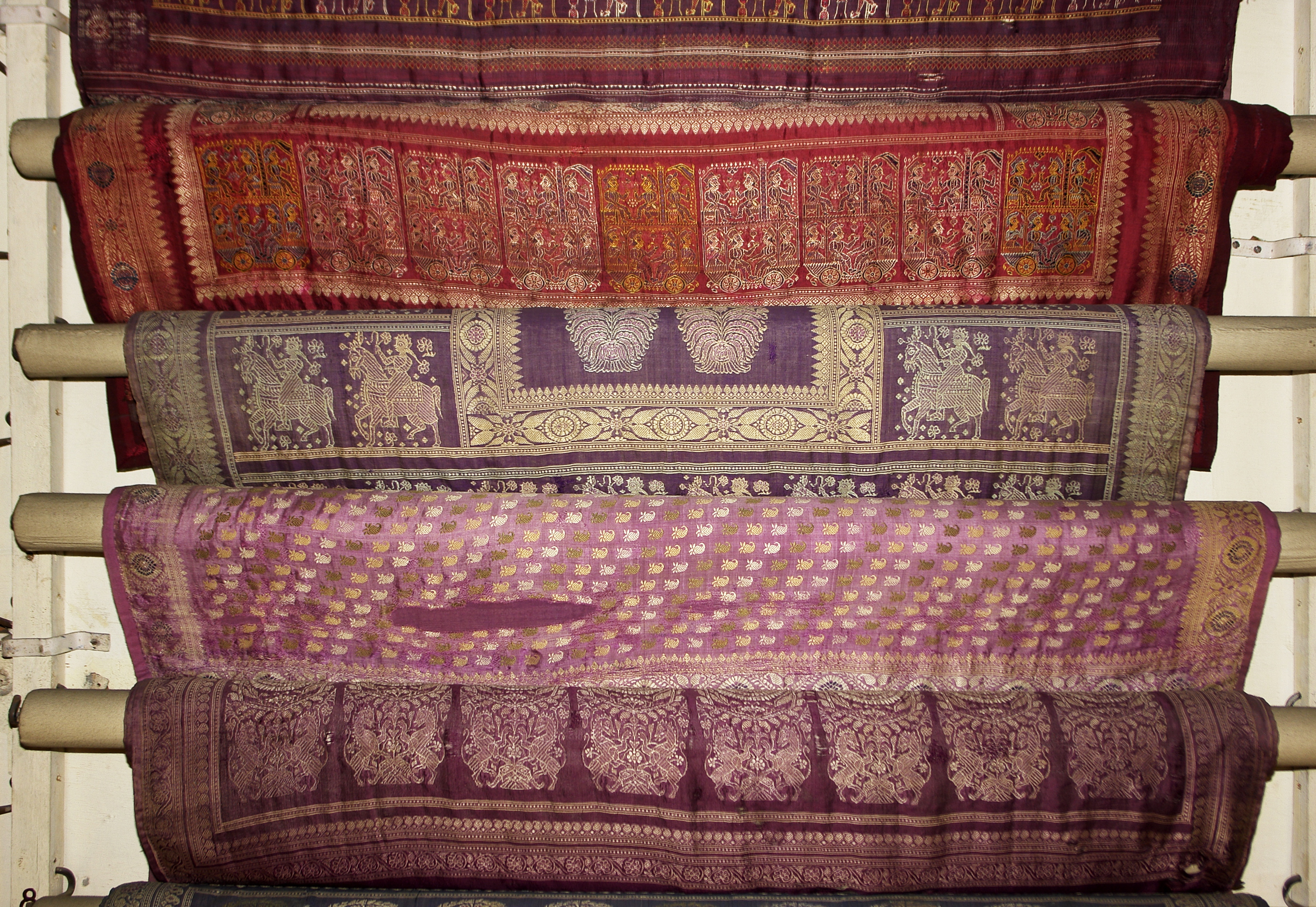

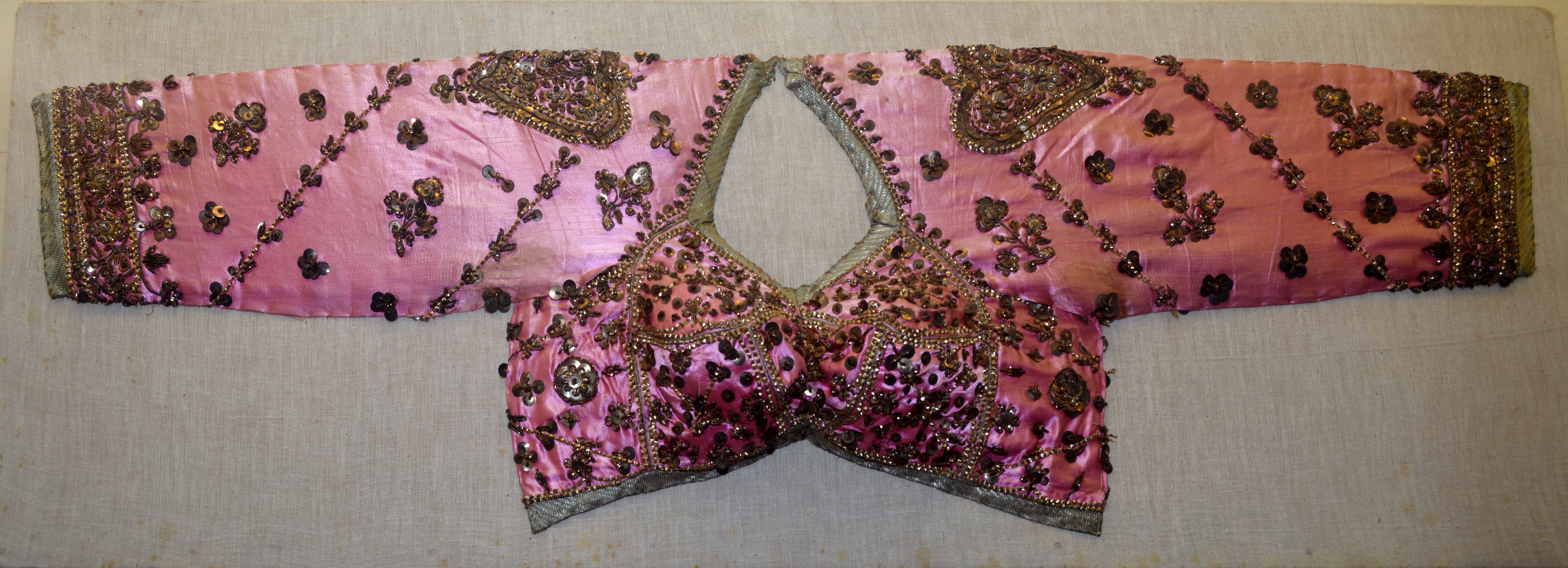

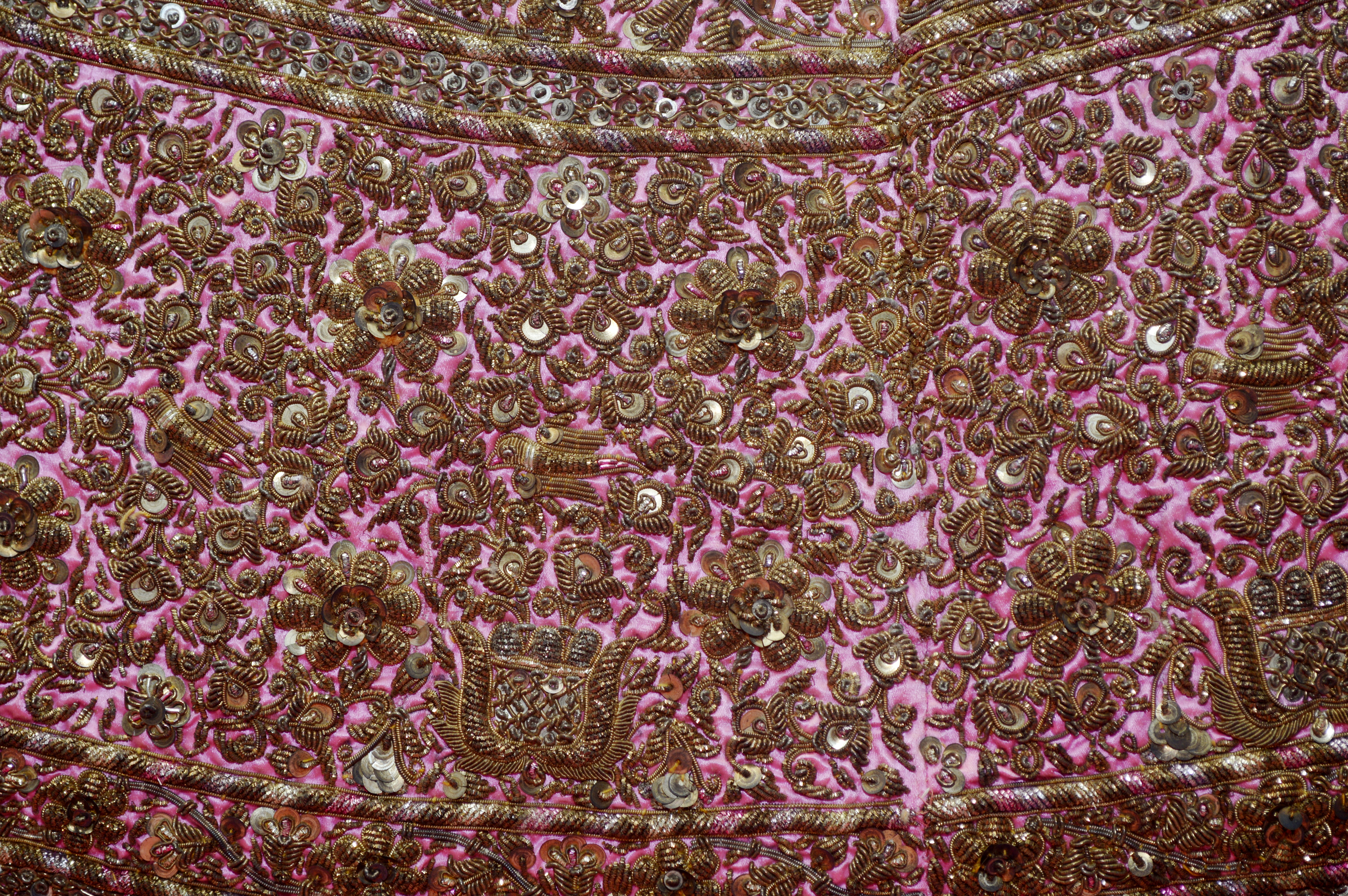

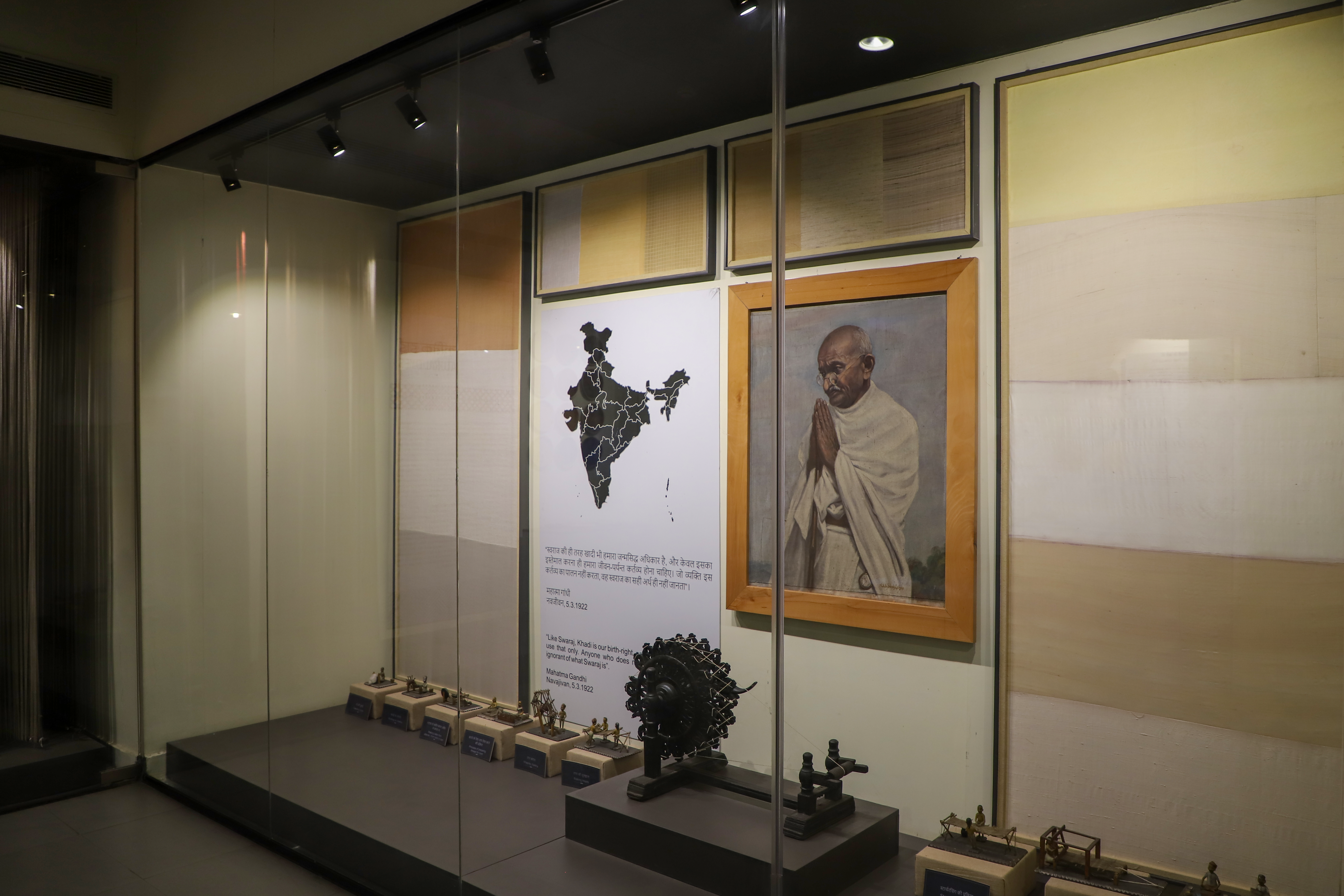
The entrance to the Textiles Gallery at the National Crafts Museum, New Delhi.

=== Temporary Gallery ===
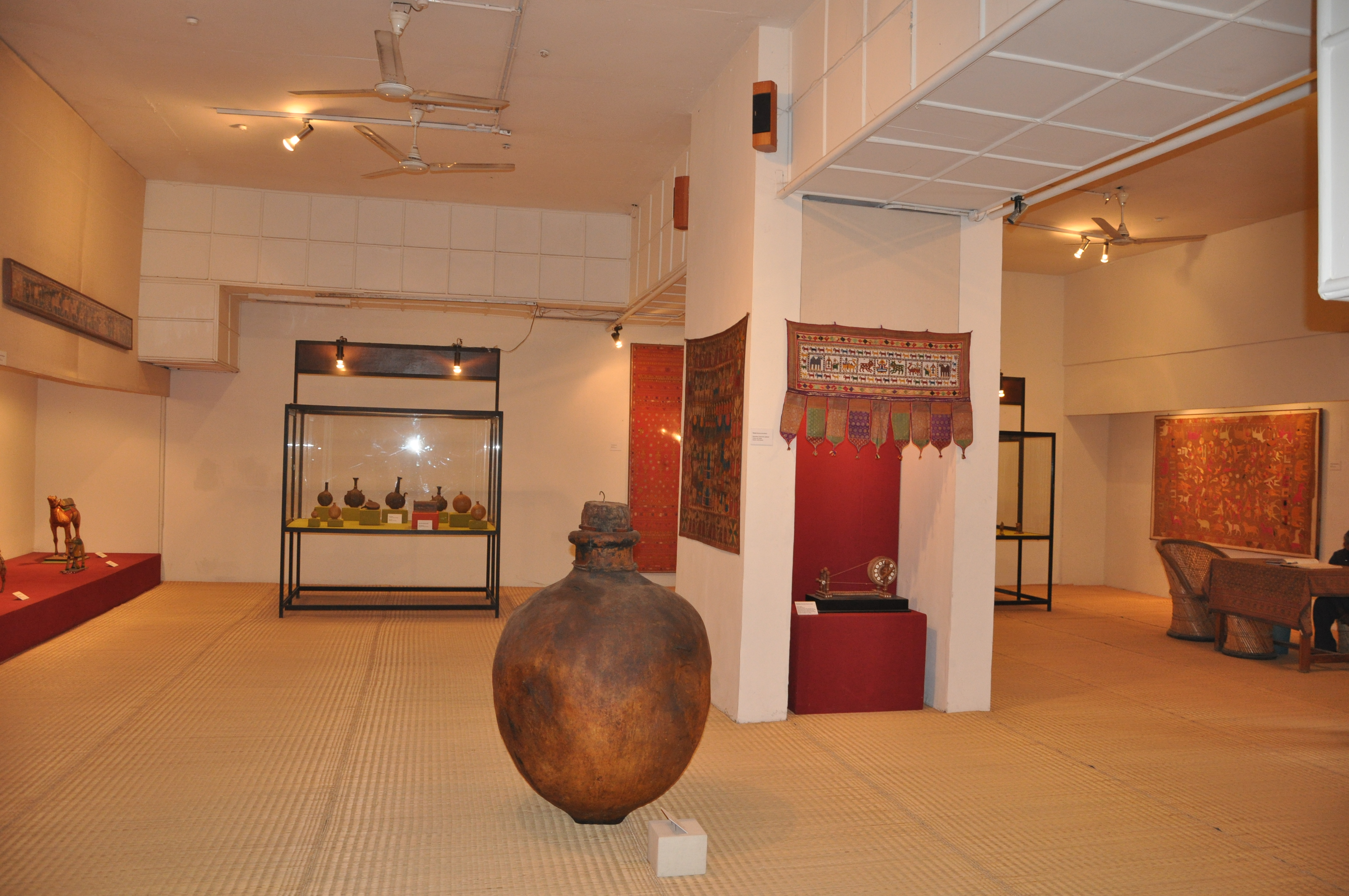
Camel exhibition in Temporary Gallery

== See also ==
- Textile industry in India
