= Charles Correa =

Indian architect and urban planner (1930–2015)

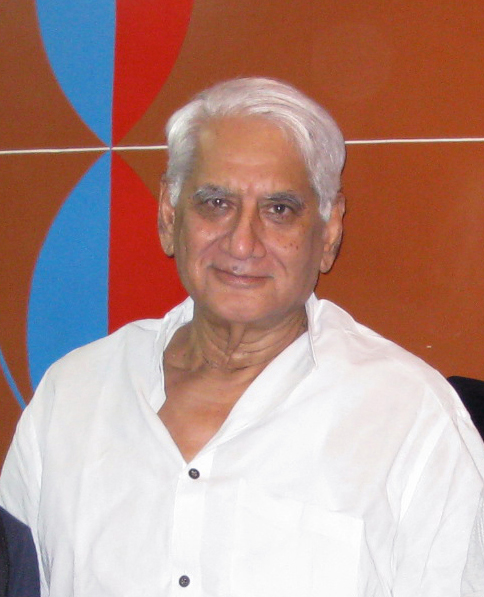
- Correa in December 2011
- Born: Charles Mark Correa; 1 September 1930; Secunderabad, Hyderabad State
- Died: 16 June 2015 (aged 84); Mumbai, Maharashtra India
- Education: University of Mumbai; Massachusetts Institute of Technology; University of Michigan
- Occupations: Architect; urban planner
- Spouse: Monika Correa (m. 1961)
- Children: 2
- Awards: Padma Shri (1972); Padma Vibhushan (2006); Gomant Vibhushan (2011)
- Buildings: Jawahar Kala Kendra, National Crafts Museum, Bharat Bhavan

Charles Mark Correa (1 September 1930 – 16 June 2015) was an Indian architect and urban planner based in Mumbai, India. Credited with the creation of modern architecture in post-Independent India, he was celebrated for his sensitivity to the needs of the urban poor and for his use of traditional methods and materials.

== Biography ==
=== Early life ===
Charles Correa, a Roman Catholic of Goan descent, was born on 1 September 1930 in Secunderabad. He began his higher studies at St. Xavier's College, Mumbai. He went on to study at the University of Michigan (1949–53) where Buckminster Fuller was a teacher, and the Massachusetts Institute of Technology (1953–55) where he obtained his master's degree.

=== Career ===
In 1958, Charles Correa established his own professional practice in Mumbai. His first significant project was the Mahatma Gandhi Sangrahalaya (Mahatma Gandhi Memorial) at Sabarmati Ashram in Ahmedabad (1958–1963), followed by the Madhya Pradesh Legislative Assembly in Bhopal (1967). In 1961-1966, he designed his first high-rise building, the Sonmarg apartments in Mumbai. On the National Crafts Museum in New Delhi (1975–1990), he introduced "the rooms open to the sky", his systematic use of courtyards. In the Jawahar Kala Kendra (Jawahar Arts Centre) in Jaipur (1986–1992), he makes a structural hommage to Jai Singh II. Later, he invited the British artist Howard Hodgkin for the outside design of the British Council in Delhi (1987–1992).

From 1970–75, Charles Correa was Chief Architect for New Bombay (Navi Mumbai), where he was strongly involved in extensive urban planning of the new city. In 1984, Charles Correa founded the Urban Design Research Institute in Bombay, dedicated to the protection of the built environment and improvement of urban communities. During the final four decades of his life, Correa has done pioneering work in urban issues and low-cost shelter in the Third World. In 1985, Prime Minister Rajiv Gandhi appointed him Chairman of the National Commission on Urbanization.

From 2005 until his 2008 resignation Correa was the Chairman of the Delhi Urban Arts Commission.

Later, Charles Correa designed the new Ismaili Centre in Toronto, Canada, which shared the site with the Aga Khan Museum designed by Fumihiko Maki, and the Champalimaud Foundation Centre in Lisbon, inaugurated by the Portuguese President Aníbal Cavaco Silva on 5 October 2010.

=== Final years ===
He died on 16 June 2015 in Mumbai following a brief illness.

== Work ==
=== Style ===
Charles Correa designed almost 100 buildings in India, from low-income housing to luxury condos. He rejected the glass-and-steel approach of some post-modernist buildings, and focused on designs deeply rooted in local cultures, all the while providing modern structural solutions under his creative designs. His style was also focused on reintroducing outdoor spaces and terraces.

His work is the physical manifestation of the idea of Indian nationhood, modernity and progress. His vision sits at the nexus defining the contemporary Indian sensibility and it articulates a new Indian identity with a language that has a global resonance. He is someone who has that rare capacity to give physical form to something as intangible as ‘culture’ or ‘society’ – and his work is therefore critical: aesthetically; sociologically; and culturally.

— British architect David Adjaye in 2013.

In 2013, the Royal Institute of British Architects held a retrospective exhibition, "Charles Correa – India's Greatest Architect", about the influences of his work on modern urban Indian architecture.

In a 2024 article in the Journal of the Society of Architectural Historians, Vishvesh Prabhakar Kandolkar and R. Benedito Ferrão trace "the influence of the architect's minority Goan origins in his design practice," especially in "focusing on the Islamicate and Indo-Portuguese aesthetics" he imbibed.

=== Projects ===
| Photo | Date | Name | Location | Notes |
|---|---|---|---|---|
| | 1958–63 | Mahatma Gandhi Sangrahalaya; Mahatma Gandhi Memorial | Sabarmati Ashram, Ahmedabad | |
| | 1958–59 | Cama Hotel | Ahmedabad | substantially altered later by owners |
| | 1961–62 | Tube House | Ahmedabad | demolished |
| | 1961–66 | Sonmarg apartments | Mumbai | |
| | 1965–68 | ECIL Office Complex | Hyderabad | One of the seminal works by Charles Correa but various modifications were later made on this masterpiece building by Administrators of ECIL who were ignorant about its significance. |
| | 1967 | Madhya Pradesh Legislative Assembly | Bhopal | |
| | 1969–74 | The Leela Kovalam- A Raviz Hotel | Kovalam | sloping architecture that blends into the landscape |
| | 1970 | Kala Academy | Panaji | |
| | 1975–90 | National Crafts Museum | New Delhi | |
| | | R&D facility of Mahindra & Mahindra Ltd | Mahindra Research Valley, Chennai | |
| | 1980–97 | Vidhan Bhavan | | |
| | 1982 | Bharat Bhavan | Bhopal | |
| | 1986 | Artist Village | CBD Belapur, Navi Mumbai | |
| | 1986–92 | Jawahar Kala Kendra; Jawahar Arts Centre | Jaipur | |
| | 1986 | Jeevan Bharati; Life Insurance Corporation of India | | On the 2018 World Monuments Watch list of "50 Cultural Sites at Risk from Human and Natural Threats" |
| | 1987–92 | British Council | Delhi | |
| | 1989 | Jawaharlal Nehru Centre for Advanced Scientific Research | Bangalore | |
| | 2000 | St. Peter and St. Paul's Church, Parumala | Parumala, Thiruvalla | |
| | 2000–05 | McGovern Institute for Brain Research | MIT, Boston, US | |
| | 2004 | City centre | Salt Lake City, Kolkata | |
| | 2007–10 | Champalimaud Centre for The Unknown | Lisbon, Portugal | |
| | | Ismaili Centre | Toronto, Canada | |
| | | Jawaharlal Nehru Institute of Banking and Finance | Hyderabad | |
| | 2023-25 | Inter-University Centre for Astronomy and Astrophysics | Savitribai Phule Pune University, Pune | Architect Charles Correa's last project before he died in 2015 was the Inter-University Centre for Astronomy and Astrophysics (IUCAA - 2) in Pune, India. The IUCAA is a premier research institution in India, established in 1988 with the aim of promoting excellence in research and education in astronomy and astrophysics. The IUCAA building is a unique example of Correa's architectural style, which combines modernism with traditional Indian design elements. The building is spread over an area of 16 acres and is designed to be both functional and aesthetically pleasing. The design incorporates features like courtyards, terraces, and verandas, which provide ample natural light and ventilation while also creating spaces for people to interact and collaborate. Construction of the IUCAA 2 building started in 2023, eight years after Correa's death, and will be completed in 2025. |

== Awards ==
- 1972: Padma Shri
- 1984: Royal Gold Medal for architecture by the Royal Institute of British Architects.
- 1994: Praemium Imperiale
- 1998: 7th Aga Khan Award for Architecture for Madhya Pradesh Legislative Assembly
- 2005: Austrian Decoration for Science and Art
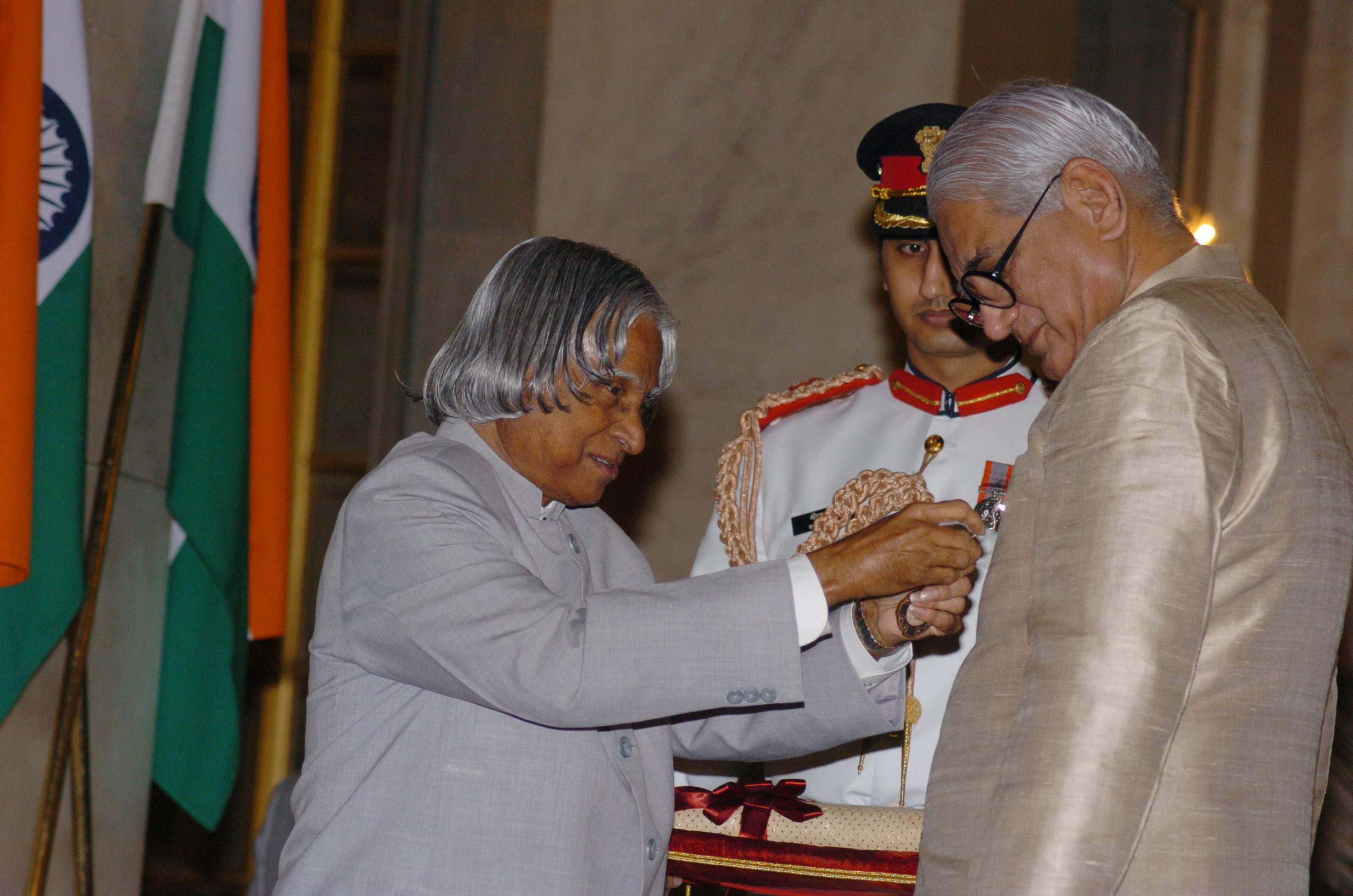
  Charles Correa receiving Padma Vibhushan from President Dr. A.P.J. Abdul Kalam in 2006
- 2006: Padma Vibhushan given by Government of India
- 2011: Gomant Vibhushan conferred by Government of Goa

== Publications ==
- Charles Correa, The New Landscape, RIBA Enterprises, December 1985, (ISBN 978-0947877217)

== Personal life ==
Charles Correa married Monika (née Sequeira), an artist, in 1961. Together they lived in one of the flats of the Sonmarg apartments in Mumbai. They had two children.

== See also ==
- Geoffrey Bawa
- Muzharul Islam
- B.V. Doshi
- Raj Rewal
- Bashirul Haq
- Bevis Bawa
- Minnette de Silva
