= Prabhakar Barwe =

Indian painter (1936–2005)

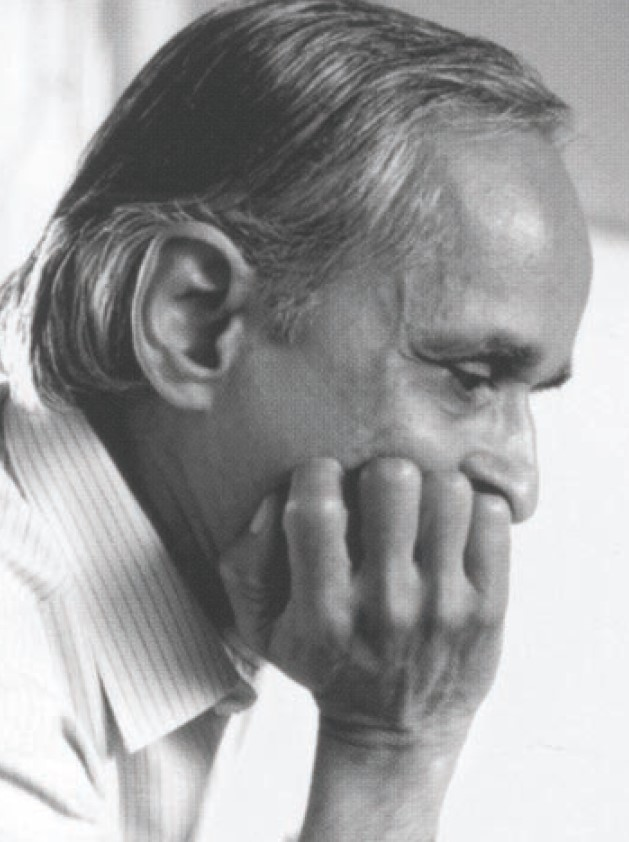
- Born: 16 March 1936; Nagaon, Bombay Presidency
- Died: 6 December 1995 (aged 59); Mumbai, Maharashtra
- Education: Sir J.J. School of Art, Mumbai
- Known for: Painting

Prabhakar Barwe (16 March 1936 – 6 December 1995) was a pioneer of Modern Indian painting. He was active in Mumbai, India from the 1959 until his death on 6 December 1995. Influenced by the esoteric tradition of Tantric painting, Barwe along with G. R. Santosh, P. T. Reddy, K.C.S. Paniker, Biren De, Om Prakash, K. V. Haridasan, Prafulla Mohanti and Mahirwan Mamtani was considered part of the modernist movement Neo-Tantra.

He was awarded the Academy of Fine Arts Award in Kolkata in 1963, the Bombay Art Society Award in 1964 and 1968, the Maharashtra State Award and the prestigious Lalit Kala Akademi Award in 1976.

He died in Bombay on 6 December 1995.

== Publications ==
Drawing Room (Gallery), and Peninsula Arts Gallery (Plymouth, England). 2016. Thinking Tantra: research papers. Pinto, Jerry. 2013. The Blank Canvas: Prabhakar Barwe. Mumbai: Bodhana Barwe, Prabhakar. 1992. Gallery Chemould presents an exhibition of paintings and water colours by Prabhakar Barwe: 25 February to 14 March 1992. [Bombay]: [Gallery Chemould, Jehangir Art Gallery]. Jehangir Art Gallery (Bombay). 1992. Prabhakar Barwe. Bombay: Jehangir Art Gallery. Khanna, Balraj, and Aziz Kurtha. 1998. Art of Modern India. London: Thames & Hudson.

== Exhibitions selected solo exhibition ==
- 2013 Percept Art, Mumbai, India
- 1982 Art Gallery, Ahmedabad, India
- 1968 Taj Art Gallery, Mumbai, India
- 1967 Taj Art Gallery, Mumbai, India
- 1963 Book Bay Gallery, Wisconsin, USA

== Selected group exhibitions ==
- 2015 Abby Grey and Indian Modernism: Selections from the NYU Art Collection, Grey Art Gallery, New York University, New York, USA
- 2012 One Eye Sees, the Other, Feels, The Viewing Room, Mumbai, India
- 2010 Legacy: A-Vanguard, Gallery Threshold, New Delhi, India
- 2010 Masters of Maharashtra, National Centre for the Performing Arts (India), Mumbai, India
- 1993 Reflections and Images, Vadehra Art Gallery, New Delhi and Jehangir Art Gallery, Mumbai, India (1993)
- 1983 Modern Indian Paintings, Hirshhorn Museum, Washington D.C, USA
- 1977 Pictorial Space, Rabindra Bhavan Galleries Lalit Kala Akademi, New Delhi, India
- 1975 Inaugural Exhibition, Grey Art Gallery, New York University, USA
- 1975 Third India Triennale, New Delhi, Lalit Kala Akademi, India
- 1970 Indian Painters, Gallery Coray, Zurich, Switzerland
- 1970 Indian Painters, Hamburg, Germany
- 1969 Man and His World, Indian Pavilion, Montreal Worlds Fair, Canada
- 1969 5th International Young Artists Exhibition, Tokyo, Japan
