= Abortion in Portugal =

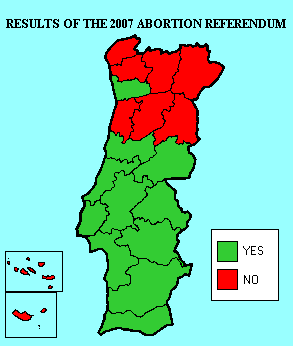
Results of the 2007 Portuguese abortion referendum by district.

Abortion laws in Portugal were liberalized on 10 April 2007, allowing an elective abortion to be provided if a woman's pregnancy has not exceeded its tenth week. There is a three-day waiting period for abortions. President Aníbal Cavaco Silva ratified the law allowing abortion, recommending nevertheless that measures should be taken to ensure abortion is the last resort. Despite the liberalization of the laws, as of a 2011 survey, many doctors were refusing to perform abortions – which they are allowed to do under a conscientious objection clause. Abortions at later stages are allowed for specific reasons, such as risk to a woman's health, rape and other sexual crimes, or fetal malformation, with restrictions increasing gradually at 12, 16, and 24 weeks.

== History and progression of legislation ==
=== Laws previous to the carnation revolution ===
Abortion was established as illegal in Sebastian of Portugal's Regimento de Quadrilheiros (1570), during the Aviz dynasty period. This law was then transposed, with little change, to Philip I of Portugal's Ordenações Filipinas, during the Iberian Union period. During the Constitutional Monarchy, the article 358 of the Penal Code of Portugal (1852) defined and prohibited abortion, which was punished with time in prison and considered, as a mitigating factor, abortions that were done to hide the dishonor of the mother. The Penal Code of 1886 transposed, with little change, the abortion law of 1852.

During the Estado Novo, the 358 article of the 1886 Penal Code was still in force. A law in 1927 (Decreto de Lei 13/470) regulated medication abortion by requiring medical prescription. Another law (Decreto de Lei 17/636), in 1929, prohibited the sale, without medical prescription, and advertising of any substance that had abortion as its off-label use. In 1942, a new law extended these limitations to any medical accessory that could be used to cause abortion.

=== Carnation revolution and first exception law ===
After the Carnation Revolution, the Portuguese Constitution of 1976 mentioned family planning as a right (67th article), but made no reference to abortion.

Abortion began to be publicly discussed after a news report called "Abortion is not a Crime" was broadcast on 4 February 1976 in RTP, by abortion activist Maria Antónia Palla, after which multiple organizations voiced their opinions towards the subject. In 1979, the Socialist Party, Portuguese Communist Party, and Popular Democratic Union parties announced their intentions to propose laws to legalize abortion, as a result of the juridical cases of Palla (sued due to the "Abortion is not a crime" news report, but acquitted) and Conceição Massano (a 22-year-old woman who had been anonymously reported to the authorities as having committed an abortion). The Popular Democratic Union (1980) and the Democratic and Socialist Left Union (1982) would present abortion bills that did not make it to the Assembly floor. The Portuguese Communist Party, in 1982, managed to get their abortion bill to the Assembly. The Penal Code of 1983 contained an abortion law similar to the Penal Code of 1886, including the mitigating factor of dishonor.

In 1984, the Socialist Party passed a law that allowed abortion in specific cases: in the case of mental or physical health reasons, rape and sexual crimes, and fetal malformation. This would be the first time, in Portugal, that a law exempted abortion from punishment in certain situations. In 1997, a new law increased the period in which abortion could be conducted when there was fetal malformation (from 16 to 24 weeks), and in case of rape (from 12 to 16 weeks). Although, when these two laws were in force, the abortion laws in Portugal were relatively similar to those of neighboring Spain, in practice, the law was given a much stricter interpretation in Portugal than in Spain, hence obtaining a legal abortion was quite difficult.

=== From the 1998 referendum to legalization ===
The Socialist Youth presented an abortion legalization bill in 1996 that would fail to be approved by one vote, and another bill in 1998 that would be approved. As a result of its approval, prime-minister and socialist leader António Guterres and opposition leader and social democrat leader Marcelo Rebelo de Sousa agreed to call the 1998 referendum, in which the legalization movement lost.

In 2004, while the country was governed by a coalition between the Social Democratic Party and the People's Party, four legalization laws (by PCP, PS, PEV, BE) were rejected, along with three new referendum proposals by PS, BE, and a citizens' petition. Multiple media cases involving abortion trials in Maia, Aveiro, Setúbal, and Lisbon, as well as a polemic surrounding the visit of a Women on Waves boat to Portugal, kept the abortion debate alive, and lead to the 2007 referendum, in which the legalization movement won. Active among the campaigners in favour was the artist, Paula Rego, whose etchings showing women who had undergone backstreet abortions, part of her Untitled: The Abortion Series, were widely shown in exhibitions, magazines and newspapers.

Abortion Referendums in Portugal
	1998 abortion referendum		2007 abortion referendum	
Choice	Votes	%	Votes	%
No	1,356,754	50.91	1,534,669	40.75
Yes	1,308,130	49.09	2,231,529	59.25
Valid Votes	2,664,884	98.35	3,766,198	98.07
Invalid or blank votes	44,619	1.65	73,978	1.93
Total votes	2,709,503	100.00	3,840,176	100.00
Registered voters and turnout	8,496,089	31.89	8,814,016	43.57
Source	Comissão Nacional de Eleições		Comissão Nacional de Eleições	
Note: Because the turnout was always below 50%, none of the two were legally binding according to the Constitution of Portugal.

The law was signed into law after a February 2007 referendum approved of liberalizing the abortion laws.

=== Post legalization ===
One of the civic platforms that promoted the "No" in the 2007 referendum later became a political party (Portugal Pro-Life), which aimed to revert the abortion law.

In 2015, a petition created by a citizen's group called Direito a Nascer (Right to be Born), and signed by about 50.000 people, suggested multiple changes to the law, including the end of the medical payment exemption for abortion and the requirement that women first sign an echogram before being allowed to abort.

In February 2016, the Portuguese Parliament overrode Aníbal Cavaco Silva's veto, and officially reversed a law instituting mandatory counseling and medical payments for women seeking an abortion through the public health service which had been rushed through by the previous conservative government when it was already in recess, before the elections of October 2015, and had no powers to enact any legislation. The president signed the bill into law on 19 February 2016.

At the 2020 convention of the right-wing populist Chega party, passed a motion at the party's 2020 convention calling for the removal of ovaries from women who have abortions. Facing protests, André Ventura leader of Chega then called for the motion to be dropped.

== Prevalence ==
View source data.
Number of legal abortions per year

There are no official numbers of abortions previous to its legalization in 2007. A survey in 1997 estimated the number of women who had undergone at least one abortion during their lifetime to be between 2% (15–24 year-olds) and 9.7% (35–49 year-olds). A study involving data from hospitals (1993 to 1997) placed the prevalence of illegal abortions around 38 per 1000 women per year (41.000 to 81.000 total), while the World Health Organization for Portugal estimated, at the time, 20.000 total per year. In 2006, the Family Planning Association (Associação de Planeamento Familiar - APF) estimated number of abortions as 19.000 per year or 8 abortions per 1000 fertile-aged women.

Since its legalization in 2007, the number of legal abortions initially increased, from 18.607 in 2007 to 20.480 in 2011, but has since steady decreased, down to 15.492 in 2017. The total number of legal abortions reached 18.239 in 2025, with 44% of abortions being done by non-nationals.

As of 2010, the abortion rate was 9.0 abortions per 1000 women aged 15–44 years.
