= Untitled: The Abortion Series =

Paintings and etchings by Paula Rego (1998–99)

Untitled: The Abortion Series is a series of ten pastel paintings by the Portuguese-British artist, Paula Rego (1935–2022), which were painted in 1998 and 1999 in response to a referendum in 1998 in Portugal that failed to approve the legalization of abortion. Each canvas depicted a woman undergoing an unsafe abortion. Originally just known as Untitled 1, Untitled 2, etc., they came to be known as the Abortion Pastels or Abortion Series. In 1999 she also created eight etchings based on the pastels. Produced in an edition of 17, these were widely exhibited and reproduced in Portuguese publications, and were credited with having had an impact on the outcome of a second referendum in 2007, in which a majority supported legalization.

== Background ==
The movements in support of legalizing both birth control and abortion only started in Portugal in the 1960s. This was prior to the Carnation Revolution in April 1974 which ended the Estado Novo dictatorship. Access to family planning only became possible in 1976, after the Revolution. By then, thousands of abortions were being carried out illegally every year, and people were still being tried for having one. Until 1984, having an abortion was punishable by prison. In that year the law was relaxed slightly, to permit termination where the health of the mother was in danger, because of foetal abnormalities, and after rape. As late as 2004, a 17-year-old was tried after being accused by a nurse and interviewed by police while still in hospital.

Rego, who had moved to London to escape from the dictatorship, had herself had two abortions in England and was friends with several other women who had abortions. This personal experience, together with her concern for poorer women in Portugal who had had backstreet abortions using items such as coat hangers, informed her anger that the first referendum in 1998 had failed to pass. Only 32 percent of the voting population had cast a ballot, which she believed reflected a desire to avoid the issue. Commenting on the dangers and suffering that could result from illegal abortions, and the possibility of death of the woman, she was an outspoken advocate for legalization. She described the series as being "born from my indignation", pointing out that making the operation illegal did not stop women from having abortions, it just forced them to use backstreet abortionists.

== The Pastels ==
The ten large, coloured pastels, which Rego referred to as "propaganda", showed women having just had illegal abortions, waiting for the abortion to take place, or performing the operation on themselves. This was a topic that had rarely been covered by artists. Originally just called Untitled, this was the first time Rego had produced paintings without a title, something more associated with abstract artists. By doing so she made reference to the anonymity that the women faced. In the pastels and the subsequent prints, women are shown experiencing fear, anger, and pain, but also defiance. They are alone and the person performing the abortion is never seen. Rego avoided showing blood or foetuses, because she felt that people would not look at such paintings, but the painful consequences are clearly seen, particularly when the women are using buckets or chamber pots. This puts the focus of the abortion debate on the woman's physical and psychological experience.

The pastels emphasised that women of all ages and classes may need an abortion. In one, a seemingly upper-class woman in a red patterned dress leans on a bed, her legs parted and resting on two folding chairs that substitute for obstetric stirrups. In another, a girl in a British school uniform, which Rego purchased from a local store, lies curled in a ball on a worn sofa. In a third, a muscular woman with a red bandana, has pulled her legs up ready for the operation. In 1999, the pastels and prints were exhibited in the Portuguese capital, Lisbon, at the Centro de Arte Moderna (CAM), part of the Calouste Gulbenkian Foundation, where they broke attendance records.

== The Etchings ==
In 1999, Rego created eight etchings based on the earlier ten pastels. Seventeen sets of the prints were issued to be used for exhibitions, in journals and newspapers, and by pro-choice organizations. Instead of copying the pastels, she started afresh, restaging the scenes with her model, Lila Nunes, who she had worked with since 1985. Unlike the colourful pastels, the prints are in black, white, and shades of grey. The tones and variety of the etched lines emphasise the setting and convey the women's isolation. To stress the sense of claustrophobia she had the bodies of the women take up a larger share of the space than in the case of the pastels.The etchings, which, unlike the pastels, Rego deliberately kept small in size in order to simplify transportation around the country, were published in a number of Portuguese newspapers in the run-up to the second referendum on abortion in 2007. Many believe they were pivotal in the vote's success, which led to legislative changes, although, once again, the turnout failed to reach the 50 percent required for the referendum to be binding on the government.

== Recent exhibitions ==
Both the pastels and etchings have been widely exhibited since 1999, including at the Casa das Histórias Paula Rego in Cascais, Portugal, a museum built specifically to exhibit her works. The etchings were shown at a retrospective held at the MK Gallery in Milton Keynes, England in 2019. Four of the pastels were exhibited at the 2021 retrospective of her work at Tate Britain in London. In 2022, the Armory Show in New York displayed for sale some of the etchings, Rego having made available a further two sets in addition to the original 17 to raise funds for abortion charities, in response to what she saw as a renewed threat to women's rights.

== See also ==
- War, a painting by Paula Rego.
