= Paula Rego, Secrets & Stories =

- Directed by: Nick Willing
- Music by: Madison Willing
- Country of origin: United Kingdom

Production
- Producer: Michele Carmarda
- Cinematography: Juvenal de Figueiroa
- Editor: Nick Willing
- Running time: 90 minutes
- Production company: Kismet Films for the BBC

Original release
- Network: BBC Two
- Release: 25 March 2017

Paula Rego, Secrets & Stories is a feature documentary produced by Kismet Films for the BBC which was first broadcast at 9 pm on BBC2 Saturday 25 March 2017. It was released in Portuguese Cinemas on 6 April 2017 as "Paula Rego, Histórias & Segredos".

The documentary is an insight into the life and work of celebrated painter Paula Rego (1935 – 2022) directed by her son, the filmmaker Nick Willing. Notoriously private and guarded, Rego opens up for the first time, surprising her son with secrets and stories of her unique life battling fascism, a misogynistic art world, and depression.

Born in Portugal, Rego used her pictures as a weapon against dictatorship before settling in London where she continued to target women's issues such as abortion rights. Her paintings are a glimpse into an intimate world of personal tragedy, perverse fantasies, and awkward truths. Nick Willing combines a huge archive of home movies and family photographs with interviews spanning 60 years along with an in-depth study of Rego at work in her studio.

What emerges is a personal portrait of an artist whose legacy is graphically illustrated in pastel, charcoal, and oil paint.

== Plot ==
Dame Paula Rego was a figurative artist of the post-war period. Her dark, complex works brought her international acclaim – with her own museum in Cascais near Lisbon, honorary doctorates from both Oxford and Cambridge universities, a damehood from the queen, countless books written about her work, and many ground-breaking exhibitions. Her work not only connects on a visceral level, it has also been a powerful tool for social change.

In contrast to the style of her paintings, Rego was generally reserved when discussing her work. Before the film, she typically spoke about the narratives and technical aspects of her paintings rather than their relationship to her personal experiences. Directed by Paula's son, the film includes discussions of the influences on her work, her personal experiences, and her career as an artist and mother. It also documents conversations between Rego and her son and provides an account of her life and artistic career.

Shortly after her eightieth birthday, Rego started telling her son stories he'd never heard before, stories about her life that he felt gave him a unique insight into her work. So he asked her whether she'd make a film about her experiences, the struggles that turned her into one of our most important living artists. To his surprise, she agreed. In the film, Rego painted a vivid picture of her childhood growing up in Portugal, a stifling and repressive society dominated by men where women were "encouraged to do absolutely nothing."

Rego started to draw at the age of four and soon discovered that through her pictures she could do anything, act out her fantasies, kill her bullies, do things which as an intensely shy child, she felt unable to do in real life. She was encouraged by a father who introduced her to great storytellers such as Danté, Shakespeare, Verdi, and Walt Disney. Rego began to paint stories, finding ways of expressing complex ideas in a single visual image. Realising that his daughter had a unique talent, her father allowed her to go to the Slade School of Art in London. But at Slade she was taught a very stifling and academic method which Rego hated, so she hid at the back of the class and painted her own pictures. It was here that she met the painter Victor Willing, one of the school's biggest stars and soon fell in love despite the fact that he was married.

In London she was alone, in her teens, a foreigner, and a woman competing in another male-dominated and often misogynistic environment which was extremely intimidating for the shy Rego. Nonetheless, perhaps as a reaction to her repressive upbringing, she gave herself completely to Victor Willing. She became pregnant several times and knew that if she had a baby, Victor would leave her and she would have to return to Portugal to lead a disgraced life as a single mother and could never become an artist. Desperate, she sought a back-street abortion. This experience as a young 18-year-old profoundly affected her.

In 1998, when Portugal held a referendum to allow abortion, not enough people voted – not enough Portuguese women in particular – so the referendum was ruled null and void and abortion remained illegal. Rego was so incensed by the cowardice and hypocrisy of women that she was moved to paint a series of pictures of back-street abortions. These are among some of Rego's most powerful pictures – young schoolgirls recovering from makeshift operations by sometimes sadistic amateur abortionists.

Rego recalled a cousin who performed an abortion on his girlfriend and ended up killing her, so he dumped her body in the sea. Later on, her bloated body washed up on the beach. Everyone knew what had happened, but no one did anything about it. "It was normal to treat women in this way", Paula says sadly.

Rego's abortion pictures were shown before the second referendum and, as President Jorge Sampaio explains, they made all the difference. This time women did vote, in droves, and abortion was legalised.

Returning to that difficult time in the 1950s, Rego told how, when she became pregnant again at 19, she decided that this time she would keep the baby, whatever the cost. Sure enough, Victor told her that he was going back to his wife. Fearful that she would be treated badly, patronised, and looked down on, Paula settled back in Portugal preparing herself for a life as an outcast.

To her surprise, Willing wrote to her father and told him that she missed him. He was invited to live in Portugal and they were given Paula's grandparents house in the fishing village of Ericeira to live in. Paula recalls this as one of the happiest periods in her life. She and Willing married and had two more children, and her work exploded with renewed vibrancy and power.

Nevertheless, Willing continued seeing other women, and fearful that he might leave again, Paula started doing the same. Infused throughout this period is Paula's sense of dread, embarrassment, and fear – themes which continuously appear and reappear in her work.

Paula Rego at Belas Artes exhibition Lisbon 1965

In the film, Rego confessed to having always suffered from depression. She recalled being afraid of everything as a child, a terror that continued. In 2006–2007, when she was fighting a particularly bad spell of depression, she tried to 'draw her way out'. The result was twelve large pastels which she locked away, afraid that looking at them might cause the depression to return. Nick asked his mother whether, now that 10 years had passed, would she be willing to show the paintings on camera. She agreed, and in a private moment of reflection, Rego explained how the paintings illustrated her depression.

After the death of Rego's father in 1966, Willing took over his business, a specialist electronics factory. Despite being an artist with limited Portuguese and no experience of electrical engineering, he mortgaged the family home to invest in the company. Rego reflected on how she should have stopped him, as this was followed by a brutal bankruptcy in which they lost everything.

To make matters worse, Victor was diagnosed with multiple sclerosis, a gradual paralysing disease. The family moved to London, – penniless – and Rego sunk into one of her most debilitating periods of depression. Her work 'went downhill' as Willing's illness got worse and their relationship suffered. Yet, she kept working, every day, working hard despite an uninterested art market.

The breakthrough came in 1980 when Paula's work underwent a revolution. She started to use her personal life again, exploring her fantasies, fears, and disappointments in her work, just as she had done as a child. These paintings – about Victor, her family, her lovers – drew the attention of art critics and dealers, and in 1986, Rego signed with Marlborough Fine Art, one of the world's leading modern art galleries. Ironically, her greatest success did not come until Willing's death in 1988, a major retrospective in London's Serpentine Gallery, which cemented Rego as one of the most important women artists of her generation.

Looking back, it feels almost as if Willing's death helped to release Rego's potential. She explored more complex and sophisticated themes, but even then, Willing remained at the heart of her work, in a series such as the famous Dog Woman pictures in which she tried to come to terms with their difficult relationship, and The Crime of Father Amaro, which brought back her formative experiences at the Slade. Feminist writers such as Germaine Greer and Marina Warner heralded Rego as an artist who changed the role of women artists forever.

== Contributors ==
- Cas Willing Paula's Eldest Daughter
- Victoria Willing Paula's younger Daughter
- Ron Mueck Paula's Son-in-Law
- John Erle-Drax Marlborough Fine Art
- Fiona Bradley Author of 'Paula Rego' Tate Publishing
- Luís Amorim de Sousa Poet and Friend
- Lila Nunes Model and Assistant
- Dame Marina Warner
- Jorge Sampaio President of Portugal 1996–2006

== Critical reception ==
Reception in the UK and Portugal was enthusiastic across the board. In The Observer on 25 March, Sarah Hughes' wrote, "This astonishing, intimate Film is both an astute appraisal of artist Paula Rego's work and a fascinating portrait of the relationship between the artist and her son Nick Willing, who directs" Martin Hoyle of the Financial Times gave it 4 stars, writing, "The result is frank, outspoken, moving, vigorously unregretful that begs for feature film treatment." Rachel Ward of The Times wrote, "This Film by her son Nick Willing is quite an eye-opener and a vivid portrait of art as salvation." Rachel Campbell-Johnston, also of The Times, wrote, "Rego talks with stark frankness and puckish laughter about everything". In a review for The Daily Telegraph, Lowenna Waters wrote, "The film... involves some piercingly honest anecdotes from mother to son." In The Guardian, Juliet Rix wrote, "This deeply intimate film ranges across the life and art of the Portuguese-born artist, whose work is bracketed with Lucian Freud, Frank Auerbach and David Hockney."

In Portugal, Time Out gave the film 4 Stars. as did Sábado magazine

== Awards ==
On 4 November 2017 Nick Willing received the Grierson Award for Best Arts Documentary. and in March 2018 the film won the Royal Television Award for Best Arts Program
