= Portuguese abortion referendum =

Portuguese abortion referendum may refer to:

- Portuguese abortion referendum, 1998
- Portuguese abortion referendum, 2007
