= Keith Sutton (artist) =

British artist and critic

Keith George Sutton (29 May 1924 – 26 July 1991) was a British artist and critic.

== Life and work ==
Keith Sutton was born in Dulwich on 29 May 1924, the younger son of George William Sutton and Audrey Pearl Dewar. He was educated at Rutlish School, Merton, leaving at age 16 to attend Wimbledon School of Art. Called up into the RNVR in July 1943, he served until January 1947 as acting sub-lieutenant. On release he returned to Wimbledon until he won the Alfred Rich scholarship to the Slade School in 1948. Fellow students in his year included Martin Froy and Peter Snow, while he formed particular friendships with entrants the following year including Victor Willing and Michael Andrews and, later, Paula Rego. He was awarded the Tonks prize for drawing, gained his Diploma in 1951 and then stayed on for an extra year.

In the 1950s there were few openings for young artists apart from teaching and Sutton took up several such opportunities during the next few years while always continuing to paint and draw. He would sometimes stay with Victor Willing and his first wife Hazel at Shalford, near Guildford and there are landscapes and drawings from there. By 1955 he was writing art criticism for Art News and Review and this continued until 1957.

In February–March 1958 he had his first one-man show at the Galerie de Seine in West Halkin Street. He showed twenty four paintings dating from the previous three or four years as well as a portfolio of drawings. There were favourable reviews and some sales though several paintings remain to the estate. In 1959 he carried out a commission for two glass mosaic murals for the A.E.I. Research Laboratories at Harlow.

At the end of the fifties Sutton was living in University Mansions, Putney and then for a while in the house of Ronald Alley, the art historian, in Deodar Road. Here he produced his first efforts at collage. In 1963 he moved back to central London into a flat in Winchester Road, Swiss Cottage, remaining there until 1967. He continued to write art criticism during the first half of the sixties: for The New Statesman; for The Listener (alternating with David Sylvester) and also, anonymously, for The Times. He wrote several introductions in catalogues of artists' exhibitions: the sculptor George Fullard; Derek Hirst; Thomas Erma, and Trevor Bates. His monograph on Picasso was published in 1962. In 1965 he was put in charge of the arts section of the newly launched magazine London Life, continuing until it ceased publication two years later. He also continued with teaching, now at the Bath Academy, Corsham Court (1963–64).

In 1960 he had stayed with Victor Willing and Paula Rego in Portugal and he felt that the new experiences of sea and landscape infused the smaller still lifes among the paint and collage works on which he now embarked. Also influential were his new friendships with the American artists Paul Jenkins and Alice Baber, and the young Thomas Erma. He took lengthy working stays in Paris in their company in 1961-2, producing there many of the 22 collages which he was to show at the Hanover Gallery in September 1962. Among the most successful of the works were the tondos, partly inspired by the artist's admiration of the Botticelli tondo The Adoration of the Kings in the National Gallery.

Sutton had formed a close friendship with Tom Erma and was devastated when he heard of his never-fully-explained death from gunshot wounds in Paris in 1964, aged only 25. In 1967 his life was further disrupted as the house in Winchester Road was due for demolition to allow the construction of the Swiss Cottage library and swimming baths. He removed to another flat not far away in Belsize Avenue where he was to remain for the next twenty years or so.

In 1966 he had started teaching part-time at Stourbridge College of Art and he stayed on there until 1972. While there he continued to create collages, in a developing and less hard edge style, but eventually started on so-called 'motif' paintings in acrylics. Highly decorative, these were often of stylised vases of flowers or other still life subjects. This period was probably his happiest and most fulfilling as he was writing, painting and teaching. However, in 1972 he had to relinquish his position at Stourbridge on its being made a full-time post. He did not feel able to move there permanently, essentially to abandon his ageing parents, now living in Cranleigh, Surrey. As a consequence for the next few years he fell on rather hard times financially but he nonetheless continued to paint. He had a circle of friends, of whom he saw a good deal, and which also allowed of holiday breaks in North Wales and Suffolk. The paintings of this period were nearly all inspired by something he had seen, sometimes simply an optical effect; two still lifes, Rainbow and Corner, being probably their culmination.

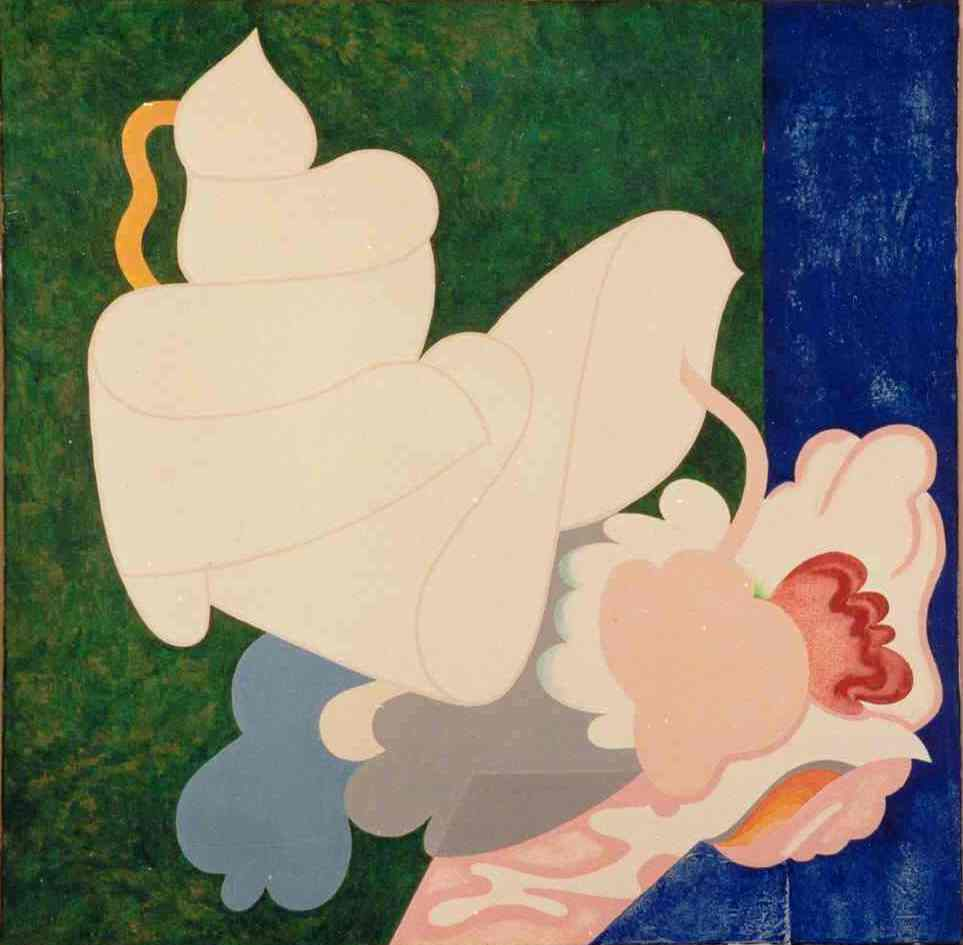
Still Life: Blue, late 1970s

In 1975 and 1979 first his father and then his mother died. Once family affairs were settled Sutton found himself in a state of financial independence and greater freedom. In the first few years of the eighties he started painting again with enthusiasm, producing some eight or ten paintings which might well be his best work. Concurrently and subsequently he worked in gouache or watercolour on paper to produce a series of more than twenty brilliantly coloured small abstracts, sometimes titled, usually not.

Sadly, fresh worries came along by 1983. His landlord, who had bought the house and was now living in it, sought to evict him. After litigation, in 1986 Sutton had to move to the much smaller flat that had been offered him in Gloucester Avenue (Primrose Hill). Painful decisions had to be made as to the disposal of paintings and furniture. The episode was traumatic; his health was failing and he did not paint again. The death, in 1988, of Victor Willing, his friend since Slade days, was a further blow and he succumbed to depression and a series of ischaemic attacks. He died on 26 July 1991 in University College Hospital.

== Exhibitions ==
1948 Mixed exhibition: Contemporary British Art, The Grundy Art Gallery, Blackpool

1950 Mixed exhibition: Paintings by Young Artists, Ideal Home Exhibition, Olympia

1952 Mixed exhibition: Royal Society of British Artists, Winter Exhibition, Suffolk Street

1958 Solo exhibition: Galerie de Seine, West Halkin Street, London

1962 Solo exhibition: Hanover Gallery, London

1987 Mixed exhibition: Bernard Jacobson Gallery, Summer Show

2011, November–December: Retrospective Exhibition: The Millinery Works Gallery, Islington, London

== Critical comment ==
=== 1958 Galerie de Seine exhibition ===
'From this exhibition Sutton emerges as a solid painter who can work close to the realities of the visual world, yet cherishes a poetic compulsion that transforms his pictures and takes us into the personal province of his imagination', James Burr, Art News and Review 1 March 1958

'Mr Keith Sutton's paintings…consist mainly of landscapes dashingly executed with a feeling for clear colour and abrupt accents of light', The Times, 21 February 1958

=== 1962 Hanover Gallery exhibition ===
'Mr Keith Sutton's collages… are crisp and immensely stylish, with that sort of technical virtuosity which makes a demonstrably complex manoeuvre function with immaculate efficiency', The Times, 11 September 1962.

'Sutton proves that he is able to make the most remarkably exciting and satisfying 'paintings' in collage', Oswell Blakeston, Art News and Review, 22 September 1962.

'…a series of complicated collages by Keith Sutton These…would seem more at home in the New London Gallery were it not clear that his purpose is essentially romantic. The edges of each form cut like a knife yet the final effect is not coldly purposeful', Eric Newton, The Guardian, 5 September 1962.

'Upstairs at the Hanover Gallery Keith Sutton is showing a group of very impressive collages. At first sight his collages look severely classical, architectural rather than pictorial in feeling; on closer inspection they reveal ambiguities of space, rich varieties of colour and texture, and a complex interdependence of fragmented forms', Norbert Lynton, Art International.

'He is an agile decorator with clean designs reminiscent of the Russian experimentalists'. Observer, 23 September 1962

=== 2011 Millinery Works Gallery exhibition ===
Howard Hannah, 'Subtle treasures emerge from storage', The Camden New Journal Review, 24 November 2011, pp. 4–5.
