= Victor Willing =

British painter (1928–1988)

- Born: 15 January 1928; Alexandria, Egypt
- Died: 1 June 1988 (aged 60); Hampstead, London, England
- Resting place: Hampstead Cemetery
- Known for: Painting
- Spouses: Hazel Whittington (m. 1951; div. 1959) Paula Rego (m. 1959)
- Children: 3; including Victoria and Nick

Victor Arthur James Willing (15 January 1928 – 1 June 1988) was a British painter, noted for his original nude studies. He was a friend and colleague of many notable artists, including Elisabeth Frink, Michael Andrews and Francis Bacon. He was married to Portuguese feminist artist Paula Rego.

== Biography ==
Willing was born on 15 January 1928 in Alexandria, Egypt, the only son of George Willing, professional soldier, and his wife Irene Cynthia Tomkins. The first four years of his life were spent there and, briefly, in Malta. On returning to the UK his father was posted to various parts of southern England, including the Isle of Wight and Bordon, Hampshire. Willing's education was, in consequence, disrupted until the family moved permanently to Guildford, Surrey, where he was able to attend The Royal Grammar School from 1940 to 1945. A year was then spent at Guildford School of Art while he awaited call-up to National Service, which he performed from 1946 to 1948.

He secured a commission as second lieutenant in the Royal Artillery, serving in Northern Ireland and at Dover. After this he was accepted by the Slade School of Fine Art, University of London, but only to start in 1949, so he returned for a year to Guildford Art School studying sculpture under Willi Soukop. A fellow student and friend there at the time was Elisabeth Frink. He produced two accomplished stone carvings during this year, a female torso and a head (private collections).

Willing's start at the Slade coincided with William Coldstream's arrival there as Director and Professor. Fellow entrants that year included Michael Andrews, Henry Inlander and James Burr, while Euan Uglow, Craigie Aitchison, Paula Rego and Myles Murphy also overlapped subsequently. Other close friends, Keith Sutton and Peter Snow, had started the previous year.

Willing was admired by his fellow students for his adventurous talent and intellectual zest, and was denoted 'spokesman for his generation' by the critic David Sylvester. He was deeply fascinated by one of Francis Bacon's first exhibitions, in 1949, and he invited him to talk at the Slade. They subsequently became friends and saw a good deal of each other especially after Willing left the Slade in 1953. Another artist who became a long-standing friend was Rodrigo Moynihan and each painted the other's portrait. Willing's portrait of Moynihan is with the Royal College of Art, but Moynihan's of Willing was stolen and was, it is thought, destroyed by the thief.

Willing took his diploma in 1952 and then stayed on for a further year. Of work produced during these student years rather little survives. Four paintings, Head of a Man (John Mills), Boy on a Tricycle (both private collection), Head of a Girl (Paula Rego) (Dumfriesshire Educational Trust) and Standing Nude (Tate Gallery) are still extant, however, and possibly two other 'summer compositions', Europa and the Bull and Musicians. His diploma painting Act of Violence is still with University Art Collections, University College.

In 1951, Willing had married his long-time Guildford girlfriend, Hazel Whittington; they lived first at Shalford near Guildford, and from 1954 in a large maisonette at Lancaster Gate in Bayswater, London. He was able to paint both there and in a small studio that he had in Chelsea. Meanwhile, he began an extra-marital affair with another student at the Slade named Paula Rego. Rego had several abortions during their affair starting from when she was 18 years old, because Willing had threatened to return to his wife if Rego kept their child.

In 1955, Erica Brausen of the Hanover Gallery gave him a show which was a considerable critical success. Paintings were bought by the Arts Council of Great Britain and also by Sir Colin Anderson, a notable supporter of young artists. A star piece of the show, Reclining Nude, went to a Belgian purchaser and has disappeared from view. Unfortunately there was no catalogue nor, it seems, were the exhibits photographed.

Paintings from around this time, which may have been in the exhibition, are Runners and Man Explaining (private collection) and Winter Machine (Arts Council Collection). Man with a Kitten no longer exists but was published in monochrome. An impressive Man Watching (a sentry standing in front of red railings), which was shown at the ICA in 1953, is believed lost. There were also a few portraits: Andrew Forge, Natasha Spender and Lawrence Alloway (the last two, whereabouts unknown).

In 1957, Rego left the UK to live in Portugal because she had decided to keep their latest baby. After the birth of their daughter Caroline, Willing joined her there. Rego's parents were supportive, and the two were able to live quietly at the family quinta in Ericeira where they both continued to paint. They were married in 1959 following Willing's divorce from Hazel Whittington. From 1962 they also had a base in London, a house in Albert Street, Camden Town, which Rego's father, José Figueiroa Rego, had given them. Willing had several extra-marital affairs throughout his second marriage, and some of his mistresses were depicted in his wife's drawings.

Although many paintings were produced during this period most were destroyed or painted over. Survivals include Self Portrait and Standing Figure and Nude (1957; two parts of an unfinished triptych). Willing was discouraged when the more adventurous Lech, Precarious Drag and Untitled, which relate more closely to his late work, were viewed unfavourably by a critic friend, and he reverted to painting (as he put it) 'stodgy nudes'.

The year 1966 brought major upsets to his career as an artist. Both his father and his father-in-law died and he saw no option but to take on the management of the latter's business interests in Lisbon. At the same time he was diagnosed with the early stages of multiple sclerosis. Art took on a lesser role for the next eight years until the Portuguese revolution of 1974 led to the failure of the business and the eventual return of the family – which now included Caroline, Victoria and Nick Willing – to live permanently in London.

Willing decided that he had to return to his true métier; he rented a room in a disused school in Stepney, east London, and began to paint. Alone for long periods, and standing only with difficulty, he often just sat and looked at the wall. During these periods of 'reverie' pictures would appear to him of an intense and visionary quality which he was then able to draw. Many of these drawings were subsequently enlarged into oil paintings, and both drawings and paintings were exhibited in 1978 at the AIR (Artist Information Registry) Gallery, then in Shaftesbury Avenue, central London. This exhibition was a critical success and during the next ten years was followed by several others most notably at the Serpentine Gallery (1982) and the Whitechapel Art Gallery (1986), the latter a major retrospective.

In 1982, he was Artist in Residence, Corpus Christi College and Kettle's Yard art gallery, Cambridge. His paintings entered important collections including the Tate Gallery, the Arts Council and the Saatchi Collection. His many drawings were also widely exhibited and collected. Particularly striking was the series of Masks which were shown at the Hayward Gallery Annual (sponsored by the Arts Council) in 1985.

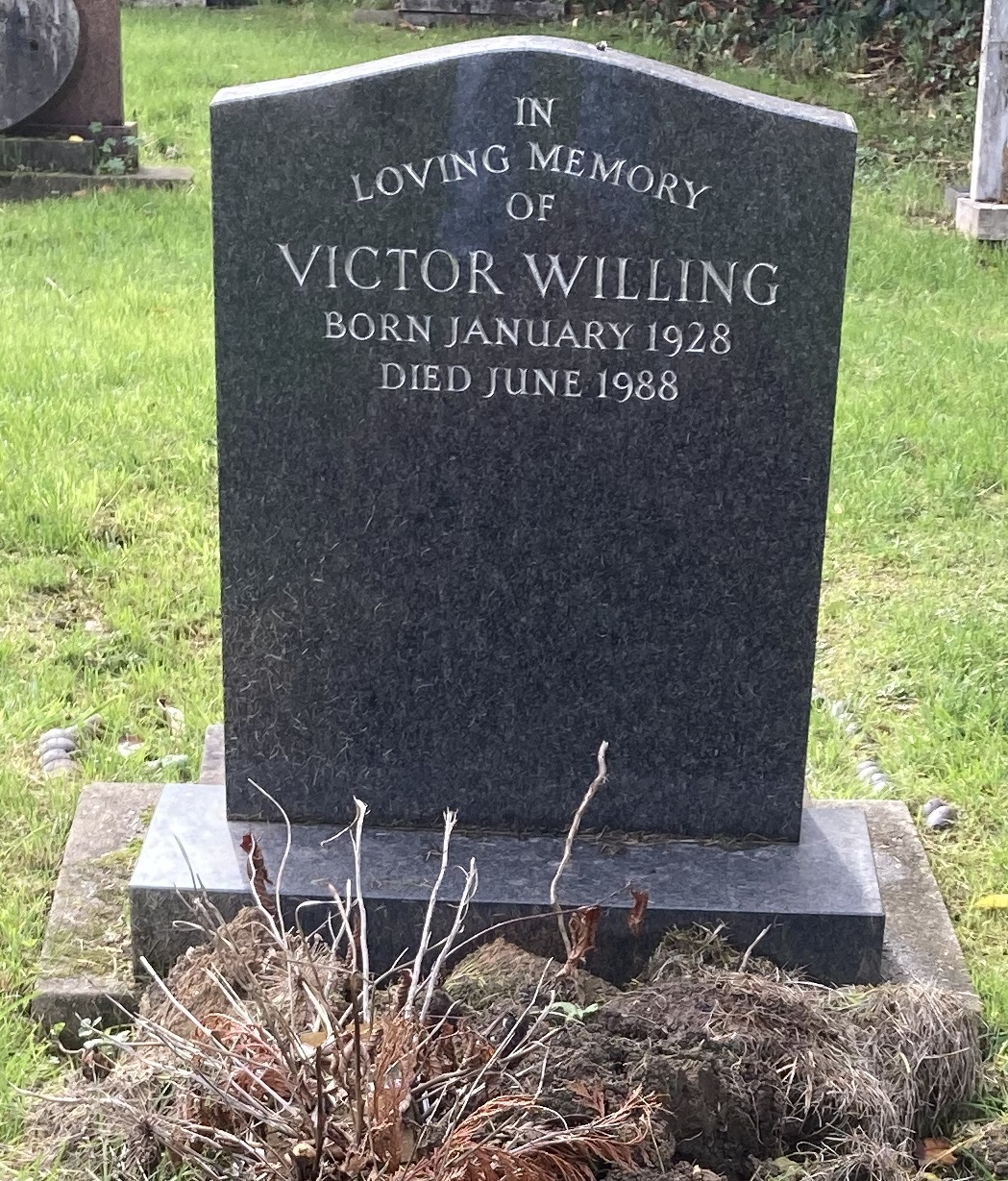
Grave of Victor Willing in Hampstead Cemetery

With his increasing disability the large paintings of the earlier eighties gave place to smaller, his last exhibition being of a series of Heads at the Karsten Schubert Gallery in 1987. Also towards the end of his life he designed and had made some small sculptures, painted and gilded, resembling some of the standing figures in his drawings. Another idea, surviving in small models, was the creation of the 'aedicola' or 'shelter', a place of refuge or retreat, which had featured in his drawings and paintings.

Willing died at home in Hampstead, north London, on 1 June 1988 and was buried at Hampstead Cemetery. In subsequent years several important publications and exhibitions have taken place. In 1993 Karsten Schubert published a selection of his writings and two conversations with John McEwen, while in 2000 appeared the August Media multi-authored study of his work. Five works were included in the 'New Displays' at the Tate Gallery in 1999, and in 2000 there was a solo exhibition of his work at Marlborough Fine Art, London.

In 2008, the Pallant House Gallery, Chichester exhibited its holdings of his paintings, bequeathed to them by the architect Colin St John Wilson, alongside some loans of early work. An extensive retrospective exhibition, curated by Helmut Wohl, opened at the Casa das Historias Paula Rego, Cascais, Portugal, on 9 September 2010, and closed on 2 January 2011.

== Personal life ==
By his second marriage, to feminist artist Paula Rego, he had two daughters - Caroline 'Cas' Willing and Victoria Willing, and a son Nick Willing, a director, producer and writer of films and television series. Nick directed a television film, Paula Rego, Secrets & Stories, about his parents in 2017. The Australian sculptor, Ron Mueck, is his son-in-law.

== Selected exhibitions ==
=== Lifetime ===
- 1952 Group exhibition, Young Painters, Institute of Contemporary Art (ICA), London.
- 1953 Group exhibition, 11 British Painters, ICA, London.
- 1955 Solo exhibition, Hanover Gallery, London.
- 1962 Group exhibition, The Arts Council as Patron, The Arts Council Gallery, London, and on tour.
- 1978 Solo exhibition, Air Gallery, London.
- 1979 Group exhibition, The British Art Show, Arts Council of GB, Graves Art Gallery and on tour.
- 1980 Solo exhibition, The House Gallery, London.
- 1980 Group exhibition, Pictures for an Exhibition, Whitechapel Art Gallery, London.
- 1980 Group exhibition, Summer Exhibition, Blond Fine Art, London.
- 1981-2 Group exhibition, Winter Exhibition, Blond Fine Art, London.
- 1982 Solo exhibition, Bernard Jacobson Gallery, London.
- 1982 Solo exhibition, Serpentine Gallery, London.
- 1982 Group exhibition, British Drawing, Hayward Annual 1982, Hayward Gallery, London.
- 1983 Solo exhibition, Kettle's Yard Gallery, Cambridge.
- 1983 Solo exhibition of drawings, Hobson Gallery, Cambridge.
- 1983 Solo exhibition, Bernard Jacobson Gallery, New York City.
- 1983 Solo exhibition, Bernard Jacobson Gallery, Los Angeles, USA.
- 1984 Group exhibition, Old Allegiances and New Directions, Arts Council of GB, Mappin Art Gallery, Sheffield and tour.
- 1984-7 Group exhibition, New Works on Paper, The British Council, Warsaw, Poland and tour.
- 1985 Solo exhibition, Bernard Jacobson Gallery, London.
- 1985 Group exhibition, Hayward Annual 1985, Hayward Gallery, London.
- 1986 Retrospective exhibition, Whitechapel Art Gallery, London.
- 1986 Group exhibition, Surprises in Store, Twentieth Century British Painting from the Rugby Collection, University of Warwick, Coventry.
- 1987 Exhibition of Heads at Karsten Schubert Gallery, London.

=== Posthumous ===
- 1999 Five works included in 'New Displays', Tate Gallery, London.
- 2000 Solo exhibition, Marlborough Fine Arts, London.
- 2008-9 Solo exhibition, Victor Willing: Revelations, Discoveries, Communications, Pallant House Gallery, Chichester.
- 2010–11 Retrospective exhibition, Casa das Historias Paula Rego, Cascais, Portugal
- 2019-20 Victor Willing: Visions, Hastings Contemporary, East Sussex, UK
- 2019 Victor Willing: Scratch the Wall, Turps Gallery & ASC Gallery, London, UK

== Collections ==
- The Arts Council
- The British Council
- Casa das Històrias Paula Rego
- Gracefield Arts Centre
- Pallant House Gallery, Chichester
- Royal College of Art
- Rugby Borough Council
- Tate
- UCL

== Bibliography ==
- 1983 – Catalogue: Victor Willing: paintings since 1978, Kettle's Yard Gallery, Cambridge. Text, "Time as a shallow stage" by John McEwen. Twelve paintings and four drawings illustrated.
- 1986 – Catalogue: Victor Willing: a retrospective exhibition 1952–1985, Whitechapel Art Gallery, London. Foreword by Nicholas Serota; introduction by Lynne Cooke; a conversation between VW and John McEwen. Four writings by VW ('Travel by bus', "Thoughts after a car crash", "Now" and "Blood") are introduced by David Sylvester. Sixteen paintings and sixteen drawings are illustrated in colour, sixteen paintings and seven more drawings in monochrome. The extensive bibliography of writings by and about the artist remains the best available.
- 1987 – Catalogue: Victor Willing: recent paintings, Karsten Schubert Gallery, London. Text, 'Imaginary Portraits', by Lynne Cooke. Fourteen paintings of Heads (two of them triptychs) are illustrated in colour.
- 1989 – "Victor Willing", in Alastair Hicks, New British Art in the Saatchi Collection, Thames and Hudson, London, 1989, pp. 114–121. Fourteen paintings illustrated in colour.
- 1992 – Victor Willing, "Icarus or the Walking-Wounded", Modern Painters, vol. 5 no. 3 pp. 69–71.
- 1993 – Victor Willing: selected writings and two conversations with John McEwen, Karsten Schubert Ltd. Six drawings are illustrated in colour.
- 1996 – John McEwen, "Victor Willing", Dictionary of National Biography 1986–1990, pp. 483–4.
- 2000(a) – Victor Willing, edited by Fiona Bradley with contributions from Lynne Cooke, John McEwen, John Mills, Paula Rego and Nicholas Serota. August Media Ltd. London. 159 pp., many colour illustrations, several of works not illustrated elsewhere.
- 2000(b) – Catalogue: Victor Willing 1928–1988, Marlborough Fine Art Ltd, London. Ten paintings and nine drawings illustrated in colour.
- 2008 – Leaflet: Victor Willing: revelations, discoveries, communications. Pallant House Gallery, Chichester. Text by John McEwen. Five paintings illustrated.
- 2019 – Victor Willing. Texts by Elizabeth Gilmore, Victoria Howarth, John McEwan. Art/Books. 128pp.
- 2019 – Turps Spotlight # 2: Victor Willing. Edited and texts by Scott McCracken and Marcus Harvey. Turps Banana. 40pp., 32 works illustrated.
