= Nick Willing =

British director

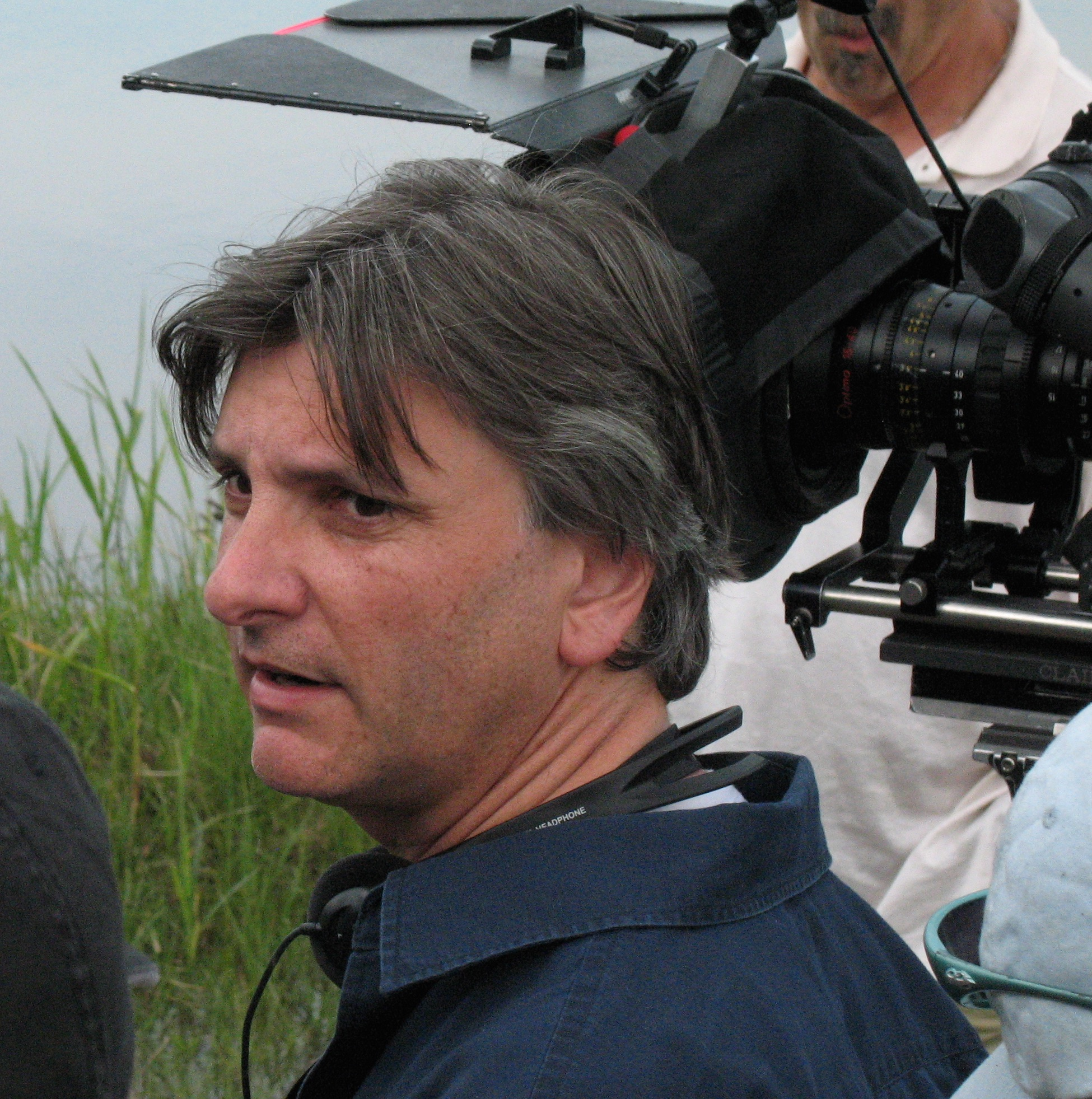
- Willing in 2007
- Born: 1961 (age 64–65); United Kingdom
- Occupations: Director, producer, writer
- Years active: 1982–present
- Parents: Victor Willing (father); Paula Rego (mother)
- Relatives: Victoria Willing (sister)

Nick Willing (born 1961) is a British director, producer and writer of films and television series.

== Early life ==
Willing is the son of Portuguese painter Dame Paula Rego and English artist Victor Willing and was largely brought up in Portugal, but settled in England at the age of 12 after the family suffered a business collapse. In 2017, he directed a television film, Paula Rego, Secrets & Stories, about his mother, featuring his two sisters and his brother-in-law, Australian sculptor Ron Mueck.

He graduated from The National Film and Television School in 1982 and started directing music videos for bands such as Eurythmics, Bob Geldof, Swing Out Sister, Debbie Gibson, Kirsty MacColl, Kim Appleby, Tony Banks, and Nik Kershaw.

Throughout this period, he was also writing screenplays, and in 1996 his adaptation of the Steve Szilagyi novel Photographing Fairies was financed by PolyGram Filmed Entertainment and made into a feature film. Photographing Fairies was a critical success and won several awards including the Méliès d’Or in 1998.

Alice in Wonderland followed with a cast which included Whoopi Goldberg, Ben Kingsley, Robbie Coltrane, Martin Short, Peter Ustinov, Gene Wilder, Ken Dodd, Christopher Lloyd, George Wendt and Miranda Richardson. Alice was made for NBC television in 1999 and won 4 Primetime Emmys.

== Director filmography ==
- 1997 – Photographing Fairies
- 1999 – Alice in Wonderland
- 2000 – Jason and the Argonauts
- 2002 – Close Your Eyes a.k.a. Doctor Sleep and Hypnotic
- 2004 – Sea of Souls
- 2005 – The River King
- 2006 – Jackanory, The Magician of Samarkand and Muddle Earth
- 2007 – Tin Man
- 2009 – Alice
- 2011 – Neverland
- 2013 – Baby Sellers
- 2014 – Altar
- 2015 – Olympus
- 2017 – Paula Rego, Secrets & Stories
- 2019 – Unstoppable. Sean Scully & The Art of Everything

== As writer ==
Nick Willing wrote his first two movies Photographing Fairies and Doctor Sleep and went on to develop the short stories of H. G. Wells into a semi-biographical television series, The Infinite Worlds of H. G. Wells, which premiered in 2001. He also wrote the series Alice which received two Primetime Emmy Award nominations, and Neverland for the Syfy network and Sky Movies.

In 2014, he wrote the thriller Altar and created the 13-part series Olympus.

== House of Stories ==
Casa Das Historias Paula Rego

In 2013, Nick stepped in to help negotiate an alternative contract for Casa Das Histórias Paula Rego, the Cascais, Portugal museum dedicated to his mother’s work. As a consequence of the 2011–14 international bailout to Portugal by the European Union and the IMF, the Portuguese government closed several foundations, including Paula Rego's, leaving the museum in limbo. He now remains in an administrative role, representing his mother’s interests at the museum.

== Interviews ==
- "Hypnotic Interview". Cinefile. 20 November 2003. Archived from the original on 21 May 2012.
- "Alice: Interviews with the Star & the Writer/Director". TVTango.com. 5 December 2009.
- "Neverland Interview". Collider.com. 30 November 2011.
- "Haunting of Radcliffe House Interview". Movies in focus. 25 May 2015.
- "Olympus Interview". scifitalk.com. 27 March 2015. Archived from the original on 31 May 2016.
- "Olympus Interview". scifivision.com. 9 April 2015.
