= Order of Camões =

State civil order of Portugal

Order of Camões Ordem de Camões
- Breast Star of the Order of Camões

Awarded by Portuguese Republic
- Type: Order
- Established: 30 June 2021
- Motto: Aqueles que por obras valerosas se vão da lei da morte libertando ("The Lieges who by deeds memorious brake from the doom that binds the vulgar dead", The Lusiads, Canto I)
- Eligibility: Portuguese and foreigners; military and civilian
- Criteria: Relevant services to the Portuguese language and its international dissemination, and to the strengthening of cultural relations between Portuguese-speaking nations and communities.
- Grand Master: President of Portugal
- Chancellor: José Nunes Liberato
- Grades: Grand Collar; Grand Cross; Grand Officer; Commander; Officer; Knight/Dame

Precedence
- Next (higher): Order of Liberty
- Next (lower): Order of Merit
- Ribbon of the Order of Camões

The Order of Camões (Portuguese: Ordem de Camões) is a Portuguese order of knighthood originally created in 1985 but only fully integrated into the Portuguese honours system on 30 June 2021. It commemorates Luís de Camões, considered Portugal's national poet.

It is a six-tier order, whose titles are awarded for relevant services to the Portuguese language and its international promotion, and to the strengthening of cultural relations between Portuguese-speaking peoples and communities. The number of members in each grade is restricted by its constitution, and titles are conferred by special decree by the Grand Master of the Order, i.e., the President of Portugal.

== Grades ==
The order includes several classes; in decreasing order of seniority, these are:

- Grand Collar (Grande-Colar – GColCa)
- Grand Cross (Grã-Cruz – GCCa)
- Grand Officer (Grande-Oficial – GOCa)
- Commander (Comendador – ComCa)
- Officer (Oficial – OCa)
- Knight/Dame (Cavaleiro – CvCa / Dama – DmCa)
- Honorary Member (MHCa) (Membro Honorário) — for places or institutions, without indication of a specific grade

The special distinction of Grand Collar can be awarded only to heads of state.

Membership to the Order is conferred by the President, either on his own initiative, upon the recommendation of his Ministers or following nomination by the Council of the Order.

== Recipients ==
=== Grand Collar ===
- 11 August 2021: Jorge Carlos Fonseca, former President of Cape Verde
- 16 November 2021: José Saramago, writer and Nobel laureate (posthumous)
- 6 August 2022: Paula Rego, visual artist (posthumous)
- 31 October 2022: José Ramos-Horta, President of East Timor
- 22 April 2023: Luiz Inácio Lula da Silva, President of Brazil
- 5 March 2026: António Lobo Antunes, writer (posthumous)

=== Grand Cross ===
- 5 November 2022: Maria Teresa, Grand Duchess of Luxembourg
