= Paula Rego =

Portuguese visual artist (1935–2022)

Dame Paula Rego DBE RA GCSE GOSE GColCa
- Born: Maria Paula Figueiroa Rego; 26 January 1935; Lisbon, Portugal
- Died: 8 June 2022 (aged 87); Camden, London, England
- Citizenship: Portuguese/British
- Known for: Painting, printmaking
- Spouse: Victor Willing (m. 1959; died 1988)
- Children: 3; including Victoria and Nick
- Awards: Dame Commander of the Order of the British Empire; Grand Cross of the Order of Saint James of the Sword; Grand Officer of the Order of Saint James of the Sword; Grand Collar of the Order of Camões

Dame Maria Paula Figueiroa Rego DBE RA GCSE GOSE GColCa (Portuguese: [ˈpawlɐ ˈʁeɣu]: 26 January 1935 – 8 June 2022) was a British-Portuguese visual artist, widely considered the pre-eminent woman artist of the late 20th and early 21st century, known particularly for her paintings and prints based on storybooks. Rego's style evolved from abstract towards representational, and she favoured pastels over oils for much of her career. Her work often reflects feminism, coloured by folk-themes from her native Portugal.

Rego studied at the Slade School of Fine Art and was an exhibiting member of The London Group, along with David Hockney and Frank Auerbach. In 1989 she became the second artist-in-residence, after the scheme re-started, at the National Gallery in London, after Jock McFadyen, who was the first in 1981. She lived and worked in London.

== Early life ==
Rego was born in Lisbon, Portugal on 26 January 1935. Her father was an electrical engineer who worked for the Marconi Company and was ardently anti-fascist. Her mother was a competent artist but, as a conventional Portuguese woman from the early 20th century, gave her daughter no encouragement towards a career, even though she began drawing at age 4. The family was divided in 1936 when her father was posted to work in the United Kingdom. Rego's parents left her behind in Portugal in the care of her grandmother until 1939. Rego's grandmother was to become a significant figure in her life, as she learned from her grandmother and the family maid many of the traditional folktales that would one day make their way into her art work.

Rego's family were keen Anglophiles, and Rego was sent to the only English-language school in the Lisbon area at the time, Saint Julian's School in Carcavelos, which she attended from 1945 to 1951. St Julian's School was Anglican and this, combined with the hostility of Rego's father to the Roman Catholic Church, served to create a distance between Rego and full-blooded Roman Catholic belief, although she was nominally a Roman Catholic and lived in a devoutly Roman Catholic country. Rego described herself as having become a "sort of Catholic", but as a child she possessed a sense of Catholic guilt and a very strong belief that the Devil was real.

== Education ==
In 1951, Rego was sent to the United Kingdom to attend a finishing school called The Grove School, in Sevenoaks, Kent. In 1952, Rego was invited to attend the Chelsea School of Art in London, but her father José Figueiroa Rego was advised against this choice by her legal guardian in Britain, David Phillips, who had heard that a young woman had become pregnant while a student there. Phillips suggested to her parents to try another school for Rego. Phillips knew someone who worked at the Slade School of Fine Art and persuaded them to let Rego attend on a part time basis. From 1952 to 1956, she attended the Slade School. She ultimately left without collecting her diploma.

== Career ==
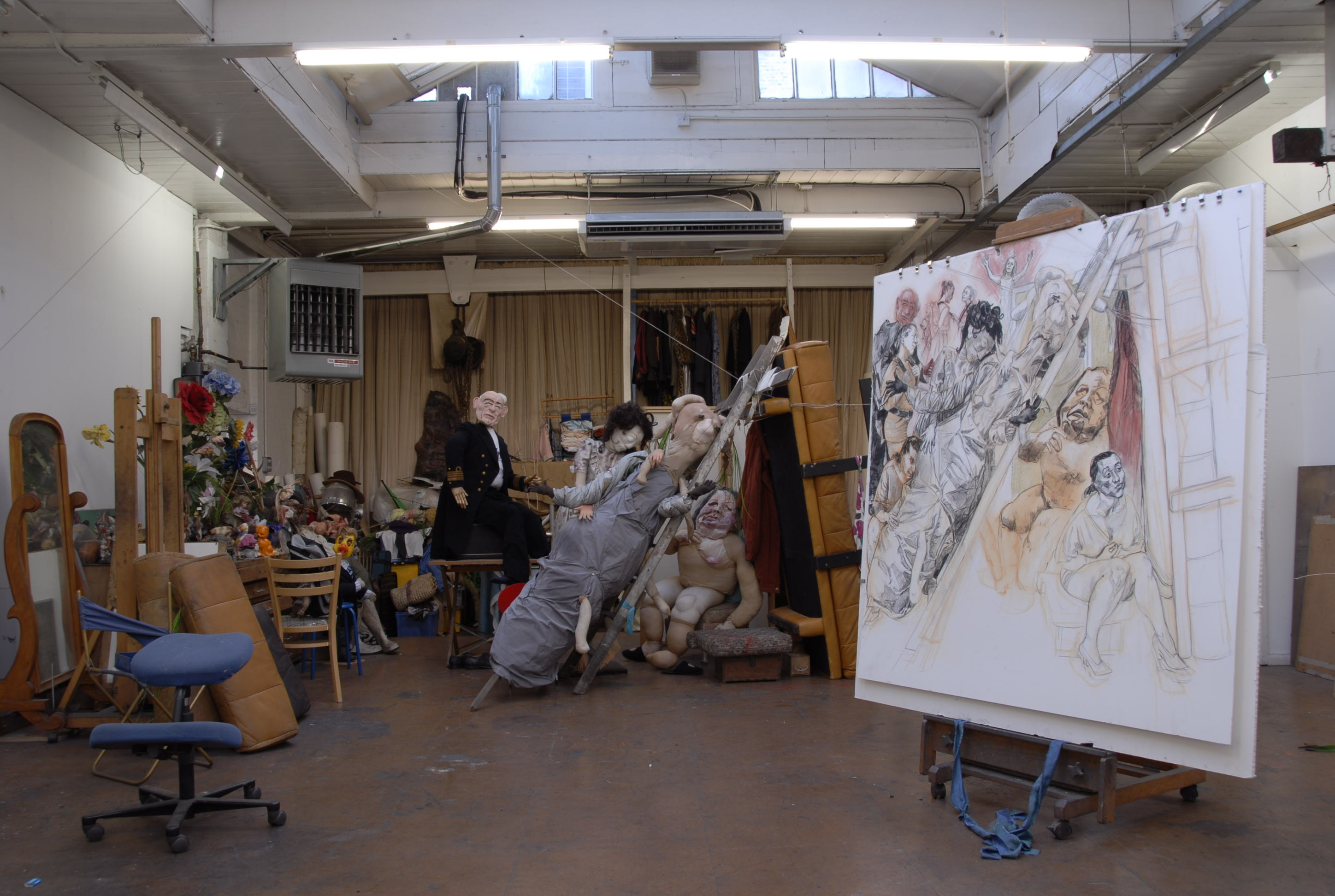
Rego's studio

Although Rego was commissioned by her father to produce a series of large-scale murals to decorate the works' canteen at his electrical factory in 1954, while she was still a student, Rego's artistic career effectively began in early 1962, when she began exhibiting with The London Group, a long-established artists' organization, which had David Hockney and Frank Auerbach among its members. In 1965, she was selected to take part in a group show, Six Artists, at the Institute of Contemporary Arts (ICA) in London. That same year she had her first solo show at the Sociedade Nacional de Belas Artes (SNBA) in Lisbon. She was also the Portuguese representative at the 1969 São Paulo Art Biennial. Between 1971 and 1978 she had seven solo shows in Portugal, in Lisbon and Porto, and then a series of solo exhibitions in Britain, including at the AIR Gallery in London in 1981, the Arnolfiniin Bristol in 1983, and the Edward Totah Gallery in London in 1984, 1985 and 1987.

In 1988, Rego was the subject of a retrospective exhibition at the Calouste Gulbenkian Foundation in Lisbon and the Serpentine Gallery in London. This led to her being invited to become the first Associate Artist at the National Gallery, London, in 1990, in what was the first of a series of artist-in-residence schemes organized by the gallery. From this emerged two sets of work. The first was a series of paintings and prints on the theme of nursery rhymes, which was taken around Britain and elsewhere by the Arts Council of Great Britain and the British Council from 1991 to 1996. The second was a series of large-scale paintings inspired by the paintings of Carlo Crivelli in the National Gallery, known as Crivelli's Garden which have been housed in the main restaurant at the gallery prior to its temporary shutting to allow for the renovation works planned to renew the Sainsbury Wing in celebration of the National Gallery's bicentenary in 2024.

In 1995, Rego used pastels to revise the story of Snow White in her drawing Swallows the Poisoned Apple. In her work, Snow White is pictured after she has eaten the poisoned apple and appears older and in some type of physical pain. She "lays clutching her skirts, as if trying to cling to life and her femininity which are slipping away". This was done to show what a female goes through during the processes of life and ageing over the years, as well as showing the "physical and psychological violation" age plays in a female's life. At the time the artwork was made, Rego was about 60 years old and her age did play a significant part in this artwork.

Other exhibitions included a retrospective at Tate Liverpool in 1997, Dulwich Picture Gallery in 1998, Tate Britain in 2005, and Birmingham Museum and Art Gallery in 2007. A major retrospective of her work was held at the Museo Nacional Centro de Arte Reina Sofía in Madrid in 2007, which travelled to the National Museum of Women in the Arts in Washington, D.C., the following year.

In 2008, Rego exhibited at the Marlborough Chelsea in New York, and staged a retrospective of her graphic works at the École Supérieure des Beaux-Arts in Nîmes, France. As well as her showing at Marlborough Fine Art in London in 2010, the art historian Marco Livingstone organised a retrospective of her work at the Museum of Contemporary Art in Monterrey, Mexico, which was later shown at the Pinacoteca de São Paulo in Brazil. In 2011, Rego appeared in the documentary Looking for Lowry with Ian McKellen as an interviewee, commenting on her experience with Lowry at the Slade School of Fine Art.

Rego was commissioned by the Royal Mail in 2004 to produce a set of Jane Eyre stamps.

In March 2017, Rego was the subject of the BBC documentary Paula Rego, Secrets & Stories, directed by her son Nick Willing.

Rego's work was included in the 2022 exhibition Women Painting Women at the Modern Art Museum of Fort Worth. In 2023 some of her art was exhibited at the Pera Museum in Istanbul.

At the time of her death, Rego was represented by the Victoria Miro Gallery and the Cristea Roberts Gallery. Her work can be seen in many public and private institutions around the world. There are 43 of her works in the collection of the British Council, ten works in the collection of the Arts Council of England, and 48 works at the Tate Gallery, London.

A huge embroidery by Paula Rego (250 × 650 centimeters) depicts the Battle of Alcácer Quibir, which pitted the troops of King Sebastian I of Portugal against those of the Moroccan sultan Abu Marwan Abd al-Malik in 1578. The Portuguese were crushed, their king killed, and Spain took the opportunity to invade their country. The embroidery (commissioned to decorate a hotel in the Algarve, but refused by the client) was displayed at the "Paula Rego. Jeux de pouvoir" exhibition (Kunstmuseum, St. Alban-Graben 8, Basel, until February 2, 2025).

=== Women's rights and abortion ===
Rego spent much of her career focusing on women's rights and abortion rights. A critic of the anti-abortion movement, she used the theme of abortion as a focal point in much of her art. Rego opposed the criminalisation of abortion and said that the anti-abortion movement "criminalises women" and in some instances will force women to find potentially deadly "backstreet solutions". She also stated that it disproportionately affected poor women, as it was easier for the rich to find a safe abortion (irrespective of the law) because they could afford to travel abroad for the procedure.

Rego created an art series called Untitled: The Abortion Series documenting illegal abortions in response to Portugal's 1998 referendum on abortion. She began the series of ten pastels in July 1998, completing it over the approximately six months up to February 1999. The referendum aimed to legalise abortions although the law was not passed. Rego expressed a feeling of rage, pointing out the "total hypocrisy" of the outcome. The pastels show images of women in positions such as fetal, squatting, etc., either getting ready to have an abortion, in the process of having one, or in pain from the procedure. In a 2002 interview Rego stated:

"The series was born from my indignation... It is unbelievable that women who have an abortion should be considered criminals. It reminds me of the past... I cannot abide the idea of blame in relation to this act. What each woman suffers in having to do it is enough. But all this stems from Portugal's totalitarian past, from women dressed up in aprons, baking cakes like good housewives. In democratic Portugal today there is still a subtle form of oppression... The question of abortion is part of all that violent context."

The paintings were published in several Portuguese newspapers before a second referendum on abortion in 2007, which reversed the 1998 result; it is thought that the paintings significantly affected the result.

Rego used two typical tropes of Western art history: "the gaze" and "the reclining nude". She used "the gaze" in conscious ways to challenge the viewer by having the woman or girl look directly at the viewer or away in agony or closing her eyes in pain. The "reclining nude" brings up the push and pull between sexual attraction, the act of sex and the physical outcomes like pregnancy and miscarriage that occur as a result of sex.

== Personal life and death ==
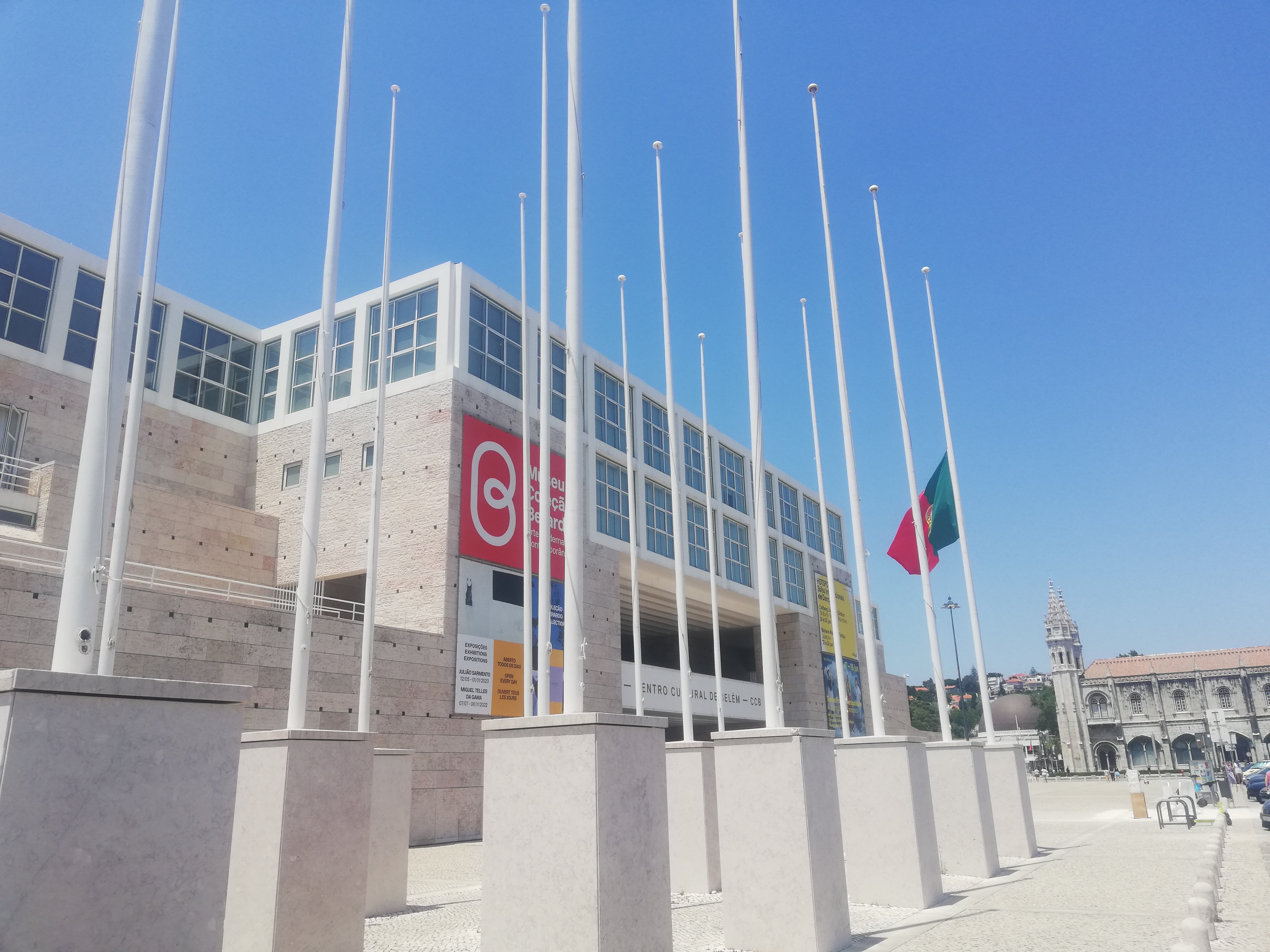
Portuguese flag flying at half-mast at the Museu Colecção Berardo following Rego's death

At the Slade School of Fine Art, Rego began an affair with fellow student Victor Willing, who was already married to another artist, Hazel Whittington. Rego had many abortions during their affair, starting from when she was 18 years old, because Willing had threatened to return to his wife if Rego kept their child.

In 1957, Rego left the UK to live in Ericeira in Portugal because she had decided to keep their latest baby. After the birth of their first child, Willing joined her there. They were able to marry in 1959 following Willing's divorce from his wife. Rego had two daughters, Caroline 'Cas' Willing and Victoria Willing, and a son, Nick Willing, with Victor Willing. Nick is a film-maker, who directed a television film, Paula Rego, Secrets & Stories, about his mother in 2017. The Australian sculptor Ron Mueck is her son-in-law.

In 1962, Rego's father bought the couple a house in London, at Albert Street in Camden Town, and Rego's time was spent divided between Britain and Portugal. Her husband had several extra-marital affairs throughout their marriage, and some of his mistresses were depicted in Rego's drawings.

In 1966, Rego's father died, and the family electrical business was taken over by Rego's husband, Victor, although he had himself been diagnosed with multiple sclerosis, had no experience of electrical engineering or management, and spoke only limited Portuguese. Victor's heavy drinking had worried his father-in-law, who had advised the couple to sell the business after his death and return to England. The company failed in 1974 following the Carnation Revolution that overthrew the country's right-wing Estado Novo dictatorship, when its production works were taken over by revolutionary forces although Rego's family had been supporters of the political Left. In response Rego, Willing and their children moved permanently to London and spent most of their time there until Willing's death in 1988.

Rego was a supporter of the football club S.L. Benfica, of which her grandfather was a founding member.

Rego died from pneumonia at her home in Camden, London, on 8 June 2022, aged 87. She was buried with Victor Willing in Hampstead Cemetery.

== Style and influences ==
Rego was a prolific painter and printmaker, and in earlier years also produced collage work. Her well-known depictions of folk tales and images of young girls, made largely since 1990, brought together methods of painting and printmaking that emphasized strong, clearly drawn forms, in contrast to the looser style of her earlier paintings. In 2003, Rego started making bonecos (Portuguese for doll or puppet) to be used alongside live models in her artwork like she did in her painting War, 2003 and The Cake Woman, 2004.

In her earliest works, such as Always at Your Excellency's Service, painted in 1961, Rego was strongly influenced by Surrealism, and particularly the work of Joan Miró. This shows itself not only in the type of imagery that appears in these works, but in the method employed, which is based on the Surrealist idea of automatic drawing, in which the artist attempts to disengage the conscious mind from the drawing process in order to allow the unconscious mind to direct the making of an image. At times these paintings verged on abstraction. However, as exemplified by Salazar Vomiting the Homeland, painted in 1960, when Portugal's right-wing dictator Salazar was in power, even when her work veered toward abstraction, a strong narrative element remained in place.

There are two principal reasons why Rego adopted a semi-abstract style in the 1960s. First, abstraction dominated in avant-garde artistic circles at the time, which had set figurative art on the defensive. But Rego was also reacting against her training at the Slade School of Art, where there had been a very strong emphasis on anatomical figure drawing. Under the encouragement of her fellow student and later husband Victor Willing while at the Slade, Rego kept alongside her official school sketchbooks a "secret sketchbook" in which she made free-form drawings that would have been frowned upon by her tutors. Rego's dislike of crisp drawing techniques in the 1960s revealed itself not only in the style of such works as Faust and her Red Monkey series of the 1980s, which resembled expressionistic comic-book drawing, but in her acknowledged influences at the time, which included Jean Dubuffet and Chaïm Soutine.

A notable change in Rego's style emerged in 1990, following her appointment as the first Associate Artist of the National Gallery in London in what was effectively an artist-in-residence scheme. Her remit was to "make new work that in some way connects to the National Gallery Collection." The National Gallery is overwhelmingly an Old Masters collection and Rego seems to have been pulled back towards a much clearer, or tighter, linear style reminiscent of the highly-wrought drawing technique that she was taught at the Slade. The result was a series of works that came to characterise the popular perception of her style, combining strong clear drawing with depictions of equally strong women in sometimes disturbing situations. Works such as Crivelli's Garden had clear links to the paintings by Carlo Crivelli in the National Gallery, but other works made at the time, such as Joseph's Dream and The Fitting, drew from works by Old Masters such as Diego Velázquez, in terms of subject matter and spatial representation.

Rego gave up working with collage in the late 1970s, and began using pastels as a medium in the early 90s. She continued to use pastels up to her death, almost to the exclusion of oil paint. Among her most notable works in pastel were those in her Dog Women series, in which women were shown sitting, squatting, scratching, and generally behaving as if they were dogs, the antithesis of what is considered feminine behaviour. Paula Rego challenges traditional female depictions by illustrating women in their natural state of strength and power, showing the reality of womanhood rather than trying to satisfy the gaze of the viewer. Rego embraces sensational behaviors that are not necessarily considered to be feminine by social constructs, yet all people experience this humanistic feeling. The Dog Women series acts on the beauty of vulnerability, focusing on the raw aggression of erotic vitality that women have been restrained from outwardly expressing. Using pastels for an immense piece of work, Rego manipulates her medium by physically casting her emotional intensity as oil pastels allow her to showcase her violent passion. This and others of her works in which there appeared to be either the threat of female violence or its actual manifestation caused Rego to be associated with feminism. She acknowledged having read Simone de Beauvoir's The Second Sex, a key feminist text, at a young age, and that this had made a deep impression on her. Her work also seemed to chime with the interest in Freudian criticism shown by feminist writers on art in the 1990s, such as Griselda Pollock, with works such as Girl Lifting up her Skirt to a Dog of 1986 and Two Girls and a Dog of 1987 appearing to have disturbing sexual undertones. However, Rego was known to rebuke critics who read too much sexual content into her work. Another explanation for her depiction of women as unfeminine, animalistic or brutal beings is that this reflected the reality of women as human beings in the physical world, rather than the idealised female type in the minds of men.

She used acrylic paint for The Vivian girls as windmills (1984, Centro de Arte Moderna Gulbenkian), inspired by Henry Darger's In the Realms of the Unreal.

Paula Rego 1996 nursery rhymes exhibition poster

== Bibliography ==
=== Exhibition catalogues ===
- Il Exposiçao de Artes Plasticas, Fundaçao Calouste Gulbenkian, Lisbon (1961).
- Paula Rego, Fundaçao Calouste Gulbenkian, Lisbon (1961).
- de Lacerda, Alberto. Fragmentos de um poema intitulado Paula Rego, Paula Rego, SNBA, LisbonVictor Willing: Six Artists, Institute of Contemporary Art, London (1965).
- Art Portugais – Peinture et Sculpture de Naturalisme à nos jours, Brussels (1967).
- Paula Rego Expoé, Galeria São Mameda, Lisbon (1971).
- Esposiçao Colectiva, Galeria Sâo Mamede, Lisbon (1972).
- Salette Taveres: A Estrutura Semântica na obra de Paula Rego, Expo AICA, SNBA (1974).
- Willing, Victor. Paula Rego: Paintings 1982 – 3 Arnolfini, Bristol; Galerie Espace, Amsterdam (1983).
- Cooke, Lynne. Paula Rego: Paintings 1984 – 5 Edward Totah (1985).
- Hicks, Alistair. Paula Rego: Selected Work 1981 – 1986, Aberystwyth Arts Centre (1986).
- Nine Portuguese Painters, John Hansard Gallery, Southampton (1986).
- 70 – 80 Arte Portuguesa, Brazil, São Paulo, Rio de Janeiro (1987).
- Biggs, Lewis and Elliott, David, Current Affairs, Museum of Modern Art, Oxford; Feira do Circo, Forum Picoas, Lisbon (1987).
- McEwen, John. Paula Rego The Nursery Rhymes, South Bank Centre Touring Exhibition (1990).
- Peter Pan & Other Stories, Marlborough Fine Art, London (1993).
- Peter Pan – A Suite of 15 etchings and aquatints, Marlborough Graphics London (1993)
- Paula Rego: Dog Women, Marlborough Fine Art, London (1994).
- Saligmen, Patricia (ed.). An American Passion – The Susan Kasen Summer and Robert D. Summer Collection of Contemporary British Paintings (1995).
- Paula Rego: The Dancing Ostriches from Disney's Fantasia, Marlborough Fine Art, London and Saatchi Collection, London. Introduction by Sarah Kent, essay by John McEwen (1996)
- Desmond Shawe-Taylor, Desmond. Paula Rego, Dulwich Picture Gallery (1998).
- Hyman, Timothy and Malbert, Roger. Carnivalesque, Hayward Gallery (2000).
- Warner, Marina. Metamorphing, The Science Museum, London (2002).
- Paula Rego–Jane Eyre, Yale Center for British Art, New Haven (2002).
- Paula Rego, Serralves Museum, Oporto (2004).

=== Books ===
- José Augusto França: Pintura portuguesa no século XX, Livraria Bertrand, Lisbon (1974)
- Rui Mário Gonçalves: Pintura e escultura em Portugal, 1940 – 1980, Lisbon, Instituto de Cultura, Lisbon (1984)
- Alexandre Melo e Joao Pinharanda: Arte Contemporânea Portuguesa, Lisbon (1986)
- Bernardo Pinto de Almeida: Breve introdução à pintura portuguesa no século XX, Edição do Author, Oportof (1986)
- Nursery Rhymes, Thames and Hudson (1989)
- Hector Obalk: Paula Rego, Art Random, Kyoto Shoin International Co. Ltd., Kyoto, Japan (1991)
- John McEwen: Paula Rego, Phaidon Press Ltd., London (1992)
- Marina Warner, Wonder Tales, Chatto & Windus, London (1994)
- A Portfolio – Nine London Birds, Byam Shaw School of Art, London, introduction by John McEwen (1994)
- John McEwen, Paula Rego, Phaidon Press, London (1996)
- Blake Morrison, Pendle Witches, Enitharmon Press, London (1996)
- John McEwen, Dancing Ostriches, Saatchi Publications (1996)
- Paula Rego, Tate Gallery Publications (1997)
- Alexandre Melo, Artes Plàsticas em Portugal, Dos Anos 70 aos nossos Dias, Difel, Portugal, pp 28–31, 104–107 (1998).
- Marco Livingstone, Paula Rego – Grooming, in Art: The Critics' Choice, Aurum Press, London (1998).
- Ruth Rosengarten, Getting Away with Murder – Paula Rego and the crime of Father Amaro, Delos Press, Birmingham (1999)
- Fiona Bradley (ed.), Victor Willing, August Publishers (2000)
- Fiona Bradley, Paula Rego, Tate Publishing (2002)
- Maria Manuel Lisboa, Paula Rego's Map of Memory: National and Sexual Politics, Ashgate Publishing Ltd., Hampshire (2003)
- Stephen Stuart-Smith with introduction by Marina Warner, Paula Rego – Jane Eyre, Enitharmon Editions, London (2003)
- T. G. Rosenthal, Paula Rego: The Complete Graphic Work I, Thames & Hudson, London (2003)
- Ruth Rosengarten, Compreender Paula Rego – 25 Perspectivas, Publico Serralves (2004)
- T. G. Rosenthal, Paula Rego: The Complete Graphic Work II, Thames & Hudson, London (2003).
- Ruth Rosengarten, "Narrating the Family Romance: Love and Authority in the Work of Paula Rego", Manchester University Press (2011).
- T. G. Rosenthal, Paula Rego: The Complete Graphic Work, Thames & Hudson, London (2012)

== Public collections ==
Rego's works are held in public institutions including:

- Abbot Hall Art Gallery, Kendal
- Arts Council England
- Berardo Collection Museum, Sintra Museum of Modern Art, Portugal
- British Council, London
- British Museum, London
- Bristol City Museum and Art Gallery
- The Chapel of Belém Palace, Lisbon
- Casa das Histórias Paula Rego, Cascais, Portugal
- Frissiras Museum, Athens
- Leeds Art Gallery
- Gulbenkian Foundation, Lisbon
- Metropolitan Museum of Art, New York
- National Gallery, London
- National Portrait Gallery, London
- Murray Edwards College, Cambridge, in The Women's Art Collection
- Rugby Museum and Art Gallery
- Tate Gallery, London
- Whitworth Art Gallery, Manchester
- Yale Center for British Art

== Awards and recognition ==
Casa das Histórias Paula Rego, Cascais, Portugal

Rego's first award was a bursary from the Gulbenkian Foundation of Lisbon in 1962–63. The organisation held a retrospective solo exhibition of her work in 1988.

She went on to receive honorary degrees: a Master of Arts from the Winchester School of Art in 1992, Doctorate of Letters from the University of St Andrews and the University of East Anglia, both in 1999, the Rhode Island School of Design in 2000, the London Institute in 2002, and the University of Oxford and Roehampton University in 2005. In 2011, she was awarded an honorary doctorate by the University of Lisbon and in 2013 she was elected Honorary Fellow of Murray Edwards College, Cambridge, receiving an honorary doctorate of letters from the University of Cambridge in 2015.

She was appointed a Grand Officer of the Order of Saint James of the Sword by the President of Portugal in 1995 and a Grand Cross of the order in 2004, and was made a Dame Commander of the British Empire in the 2010 Queen's Birthday Honours. In 2019, she was awarded the Portuguese government's Medal of Cultural Merit.

In 2009, the Casa das Histórias Paula Rego was opened in Cascais, Portugal. The museum dedicated to Rego's work was designed by the Pritzker Prize-winning architect Eduardo Souto de Moura, and several key exhibitions of her work have since been staged there.

Rego also won the MAPFRE Foundation Drawing Prize in Madrid in 2010. In 2017, she was one of the first five recipients of the Maria Isabel Barreno prize.

In 2022, she was posthumously made a Grand Collar of the Order of Camões by the President of the Portuguese Republic, Marcelo Rebelo de Sousa.

== See also ==
- War (Rego painting)
