= Andy Smart =

British comedian (1959–2023)

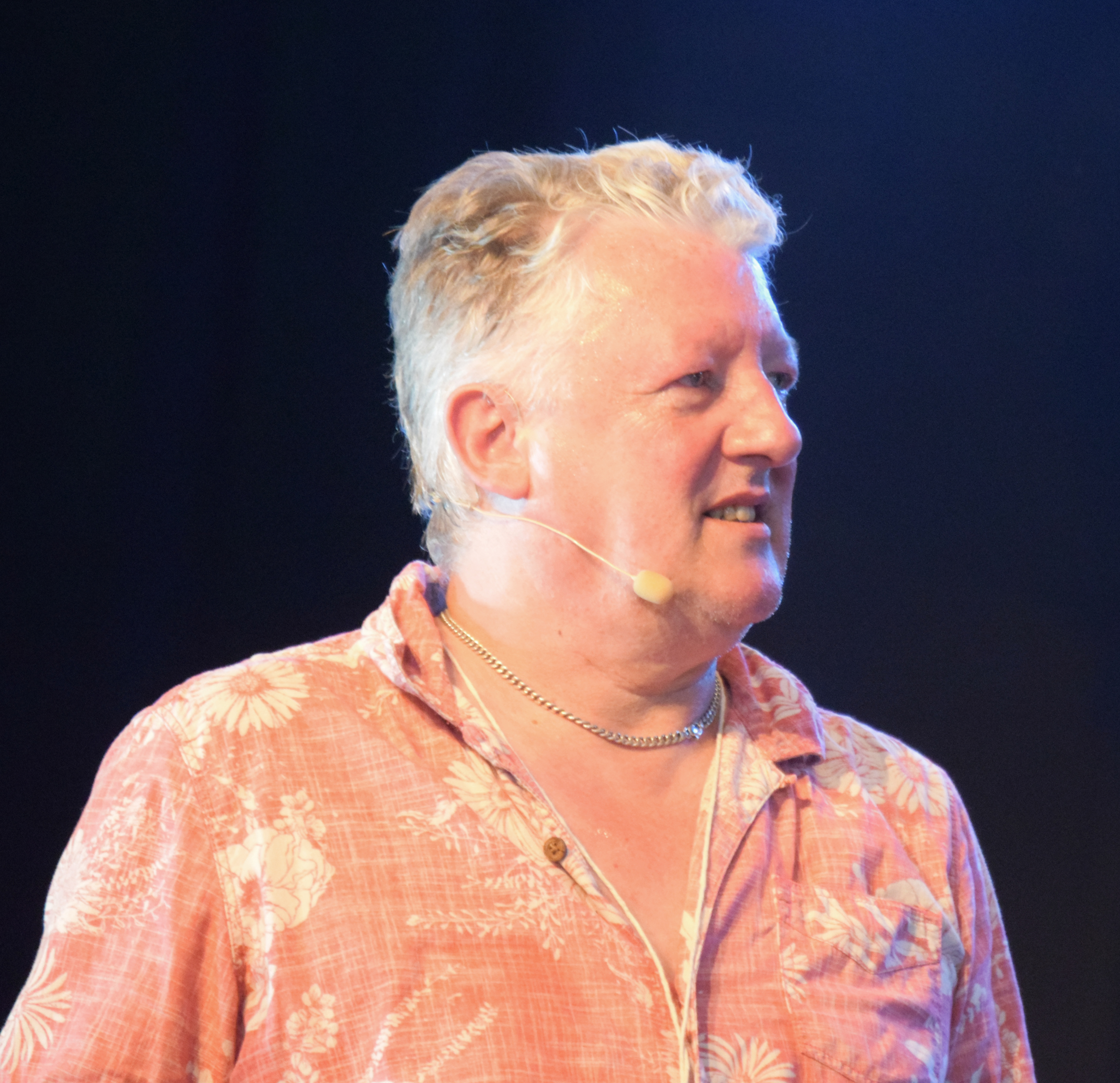
- Smart performing in 2019
- Born: 16 June 1959; Southsea, Hampshire, England
- Died: 16 May 2023 (aged 63)
- Occupations: Comedian, actor, writer and TV panel show participant
- Children: 2

Andy Smart (16 June 1959 – 16 May 2023) was an English comedian.

Smart performed as a guest with The Comedy Store Players for over 13 years, and a permanent member from 1995. Before joining the Players he was one half of the Vicious Boys with Angelo Abela. Together they won the 1984 Time Out Street Entertainer Award and later appeared on LWT's Wake Up London and Channel 4's The Tube, where, dressed as a bell boy and pretending to be a Great Dane, Smart licked Paula Yates' face.

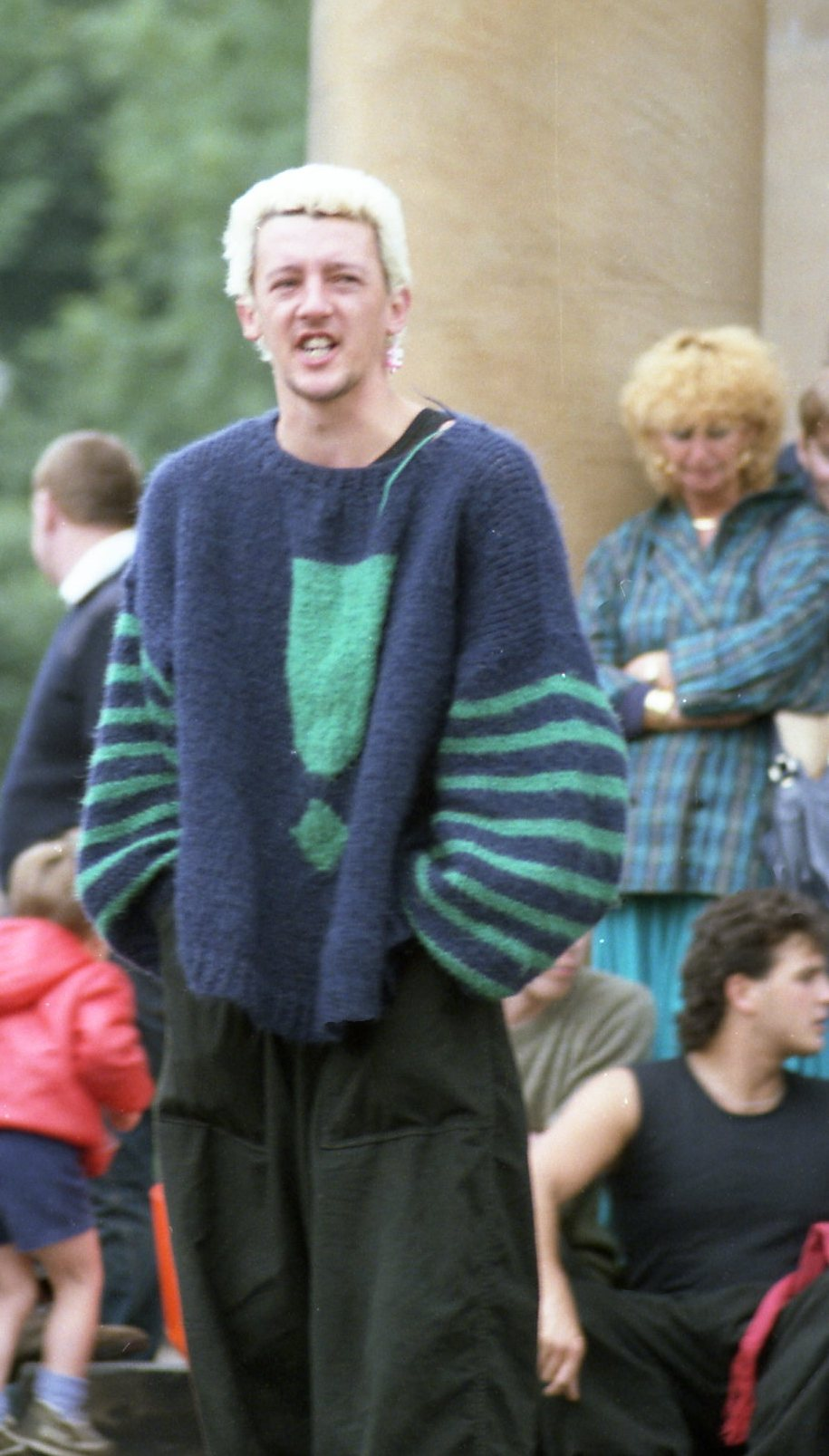
1985 Edinburgh Fringe. Andy Smart performing as a street entertainer. (Angelo Abela is sitting behind him)

Smart presented the 1987 NFL season on Channel 4 alongside Abela.

On The Graham Norton Show, Martin Freeman once mentioned that Smart saved him from choking on crisps using the Heimlich manoeuvre.

He released a book about his life and career, A Hitch in Time: From Liverpool to Pamplona on a 72,000-Mile Road Trip, in 2019.

== Personal life and death ==
Smart had a daughter, Grace (born 1993), a set designer, with actress and playwright Victoria Willing, and a son, Joe.

Smart was a supporter of Farnborough F.C. and appeared on Farnborough FC Radio as a co-commentator.

Smart died on 16 May 2023, at the age of 63. It was announced by his daughter, Grace.
