= Doctor Sleep (2002 film) =

Film by Nick Willing

- Film poster
- Directed by: Nick Willing
- Screenplay by: Nick Willing; William Brookfield
- Based on: Doctor Sleep by Madison Smartt Bell
- Produced by: Michele Camarda; Gary Tuck
- Starring: Goran Višnjić; Shirley Henderson; Miranda Otto; Paddy Considine; Claire Rushbrook; Fiona Shaw
- Cinematography: Peter Sova
- Edited by: Niven Howie
- Music by: Simon Boswell
- Production company: BBC Films
- Release date: 2002
- Running time: 108 minutes
- Country: United Kingdom
- Language: English

Doctor Sleep, also known as Close Your Eyes and Hypnotic, is a 2002 British thriller film directed by Nick Willing, based on the novel of the same name written by American Madison Smartt Bell. The film stars Goran Višnjić as Michael Strother, Shirley Henderson as Detective Janet Losey, and Paddy Considine as Elliot Spruggs.

== Plot ==
While treating a policewoman for smoking, hypnotherapist Michael Strother has a telepathic vision of a young girl floating beneath the surface of a stream. She is found to be the escaped victim of a ritualistic serial killer. The girl has become mute because of her experience, and Strother is called upon by Scotland Yard to unlock the secrets she holds. They are trying to catch a killer who believes that he has discovered the key to immortality through these murders.

== Production ==
The 2006 edition of Screen World listed Close Your Eyes as the lead title, with the alternative titles of Doctor Sleep and Hypnotic, noting it was "a BBC Films, the Film Consortium presentation in association with the Film Council of a Kismet Film Co. production".

== Critical reception ==
The review aggregator website Rotten Tomatoes assigned Close Your eyes an approval rating of 46%, based on 37 reviews assessed as positive or negative; the average rating among the reviews is 5.7/10.

Jessica Winter, writing for The Village Voice, said of Close Your Eyes, "Willing's confused procedural—derived from a novel by Madison Smartt Bell—is a hasty throwback to the sado-medieval Exorcist descendants of the turn of the millennium (Stigmata, Stir of Echoes, Lost Souls). The somnolent cast can't keep the faith."

People's staff reviewed the film, writing, "Close Your Eyes is an intelligently crafted, psychologically complex thriller in which suspense keeps building. The hypnotist has secrets of his own that are only slowly revealed. It is an indication of this movie's concern for its characters rather than bloody special effects that it spends as much time delving into the hypnotist’s sometimes tense relationship with his pregnant wife (Otto) as it does having him hunt for the killer. Visnjic... effectively dips into the same dark pool of self-loathing and depression here."

Mark Jenkins, reviewing Close Your Eyes for The Washington Post, described the film: "Effectively foreboding and rather silly, director Nick Willing's creep-out has a British accent but a Hollywood soul." Jenkins concluded, "Shot mostly in lesser-known neighborhoods, Close Your Eyes presents a London that many American moviegoers will not have seen before. But the plot, loosely derived from Madison Smartt Bell's 'Doctor Sleep,' is utterly stale."

Stephen Holden of The New York Times called Close Your Eyes "a flashy, mildly tingly British thriller... adapted from Madison Smartt Bell's novel 'Doctor Sleep'". Holden said, "As the movie clanks along, relying on montages that reshuffle the same enigmatic images over and over, the fragments don't add up to a coherent jigsaw puzzle. The film is so desperate to sustain a creepy atmosphere that it throws in false jolts of horror and sudden, ominous changes of mood just to bolster a sense of mounting, insomniac paranoia."

Slant Magazine's Joe McGovern said, "Shirley Henderson and Goran Visnjic sex up Close Your Eyes—an achievement worth noting given the otherwise neutered condition of this leaden procedural, and the fact that the two actors virtually never touch." McGovern said, "The references to Hitchcock, Polanski, and Nicolas Roeg are bandied about, but the movie adulterates the tight atmosphere of those filmmakers with vacant, modernist gore... Still, like most UK horror cinema, Close Your Eyes is braced by its supporting roster of Brit pros."

Stephen Dalton, writing for The Times, said Close Your Eyes combines "elements of Rosemary’s Baby with some nightmarish twists" and that Willing's film "is saddled with an implausible plot". Dalton concluded, "But it is still an unnerving horror yarn that features a high-class cast, including Shirley Henderson, Paddy Considine and Corin Redgrave."
