= Unstoppable. Sean Scully & The Art of Everything =

- Directed by: Nick Willing
- Music by: Madison Willing
- Country of origin: United Kingdom

Production
- Producer: Michele Carmarda
- Cinematography: Juvenal de Figueiroa
- Editor: Nick Willing
- Running time: 82 minutes
- Production company: Kismet Films for the BBC

Original release
- Network: BBC 2
- Release: 6 April 2019

Unstoppable. Sean Scully & The Art of Everything is a 2019 documentary film about a year in the life of the abstract painter Sean Scully.

Sean Scully with 'Ghost'

Unstoppable screened on BBC 2 at 9:00 p.m. on 6 April 2019, marking the return of the BBC's Arena.

== Critical reception ==
In The Times on 6 April 2019, Chris Bennion described the film as "excellent" and said that "Scully is an absolute knockout of a documentary subject, always ready with a quotable line or a self-mythologising story. You might not know much about abstract art, but you'll like Scully".

In The Daily Telegraph on 6 April 2019, Vicki Power wrote that "Nick Willing treats his subject with a light touch and beautifully captures the artist and his work". On 7 April 2019, Chris Harvey, also of The Telegraph, described the film as "superb".

In the Financial Times on 5 April 2019, Suzi Feay gave the film four stars, writing, "By the end of Unstoppable: Sean Scully and the Art of Everything (Saturday, BBC2, 9:00 p.m.), there has been much to absorb about showmanship, self-belief and selling."

The Guardian chose Unstoppable for its Pick of the Day and Gwilym Mumford wrote: "As one admirer puts it in this documentary portrait, the Irish abstract painter Sean Scully's striking striped and chequered works act as "sounding boards for the soul". On top of their aesthetic qualities, they have made Scully one of the world's most saleable artists, one whose works are hung everywhere from New York to Shanghai."

In the Radio Times, David Crawford wrote, "Scully is a fascinating character, a bullish self-promoter whose mantra of "I don't care" masks a thoughtful, tender personality. Nick Willing's film explores those contradictions in lively style, much as Scully slaps paint on to his bold, vivid works."

In his lengthy review for ArtNet News on 6 May 2019, Kenny Schachter wrote, "The program is as much about Scully as it is symptomatic of a media- and celebrity-saturated world, and of our proclivity to stuff a foot (or two) into our collective mouths whenever a camera (or recorder) is switched on."
