= Victoria Willing =

British actress

- Born: 1959 (age 66–67); Marylebone, Central London, England, United Kingdom
- Occupation: Actress
- Children: 1
- Parents: Victor Willing (father); Paula Rego (mother)
- Relatives: Nick Willing (brother)

Victoria C. Willing (born 1959) is a British actress known for her work on The Inbetweeners and various Jim Henson Company productions. In January 2020, Willing appeared in an episode of the BBC soap opera Doctors as Gwen Hubbard, and in August 2020, she appeared in an episode of the BBC medical drama Casualty.

== Early life ==
In 1959, Willing was born in Marylebone, Central London to artist parents. She is the daughter of Dame Paula Rego and Victor Willing.

== Personal life ==
Willing has a daughter, Grace Smart, a set designer born in 1993, by actor and comedian Andy Smart.
