= War (Rego painting) =

Painting by Paula Rego

- War by Paula Rego (2003)
- Artist: Paula Rego
- Year: 2003
- Dimensions: 160 cm × 120 cm (63 in × 47 in)
- Location: Tate

War is a painting created by Portuguese-British visual artist Paula Rego in 2003.

== Description ==
War is a large pastel on paper composition measuring 1600mm x 1200mm. A rabbit-headed woman stands prominently in the centre carrying a wounded child, surrounded by several realistic and fantastical figures recalling a style Rego describes as "beautiful grotesque".

For The Telegraph's Alastair Sooke, "The more you look at War, the curiouser and curiouser it becomes. Rego's white rabbits owe more to Richard Kelly's film Donnie Darko than Lewis Carroll's Wonderland."

== Background ==
The painting first appeared as part of Rego's "Jane Eyre and Other Stories" exhibition at Marlborough Fine Art in London in 2003. It was inspired by a photograph that appeared in The Guardian near the beginning of the Iraq War, in which a girl in a white dress is seen running from an explosion, with a woman and her baby unmoving behind her. In an interview conducted in relation to the Museo Nacional Centro de Arte Reina Sofía's 2007 exhibition, Rego said of this painting, "I thought I would do a picture about these children getting hurt, but I turned them into rabbits' heads, like masks. It’s very difficult to do it with humans, it doesn’t get the same kind of feel at all. It seemed more real to transform them into creatures."

The composition features several recurring themes and motifs in Rego's work including social criticism, sexuality, and rabbits or fairy tale imagery generally.

Rego donated War to the Tate's permanent collection in 2005.
