= Casa das Histórias Paula Rego =

Art gallery in Cascais, Portugal, devoted to the work of Paula Rego

- Location within Portugal
- Established: 2009; 17 years ago
- Location: Cascais, Portugal
- Coordinates: 38.69036°N 9.42133°W
- Website: casadashistoriaspaularego.com

The Casa das Histórias Paula Rego ("House of Stories Paula Rego") is a museum in Cascais, Lisbon District, on the Portuguese Riviera, designed by the architect Eduardo Souto de Moura to house some of the works of the artist Paula Rego (1935 – 2022).

== Design ==
On the site of the disused tennis courts of the former Sporting Club of Cascais, the building designed by Souto De Moura, who was personally chosen by Paula Rego, uses the region's historical architecture, particularly the nearby Palace of Sintra, in a contemporary way. It was designed to be fully in keeping with her wishes, having indicated that it should be “fun, lively and also a bit mischievous”. Its two pyramid-shaped towers and the red-coloured concrete are very distinctive and the previously existing mature trees of the park have been incorporated as elements in the design. The building consists of four wings, of different heights and sizes, subdivided into connecting rooms that are laid out around a central room designed to house temporary exhibitions. It has 750 m^{2} of exhibition space, together with a 200-seat auditorium, shop and café. The museum has been described as “that rare project which has brought together an enlightened client, a brilliant architect and powerful subject matter”.

== The collection ==
The collection consists of paintings, drawings and etchings produced by the artist on a variety of media and using a wide range of techniques. It covers a period of roughly 50 years in her career. Exhibits are shown in the permanent exhibition on a rotational basis, following different themes. This makes it possible to follow the different techniques and artistic approaches that Paula Rego used, as well to understand her unique contribution. The museum's collection is based on a long-term loan of 22 paintings, 257 etchings and 273 drawings by the artist and also includes 15 paintings by her late husband Victor Willing, together with some of the models used by Rego, a large patchwork and some of her personal papers.

== Gallery ==
Café terrace beside the pyramidal towers

Museum bookshop beneath a pyramidal skylight

Wooden scale model of the museum
