= 2007 Portuguese abortion referendum =

- 11 February 2007
- Are you in agreement with the decriminalization of the voluntary interruption of pregnancy, if carried out, by the woman's choice, in the first ten weeks in a legally authorized health institution?

Results
Choice	Votes	%
Yes	2,231,529	59.25%
No	1,534,669	40.75%
Valid votes	3,766,198	98.07%
Invalid or blank votes	73,978	1.93%
Total votes	3,840,176	100.00%
Registered voters/turnout	8,814,016	43.57%

Results
Yes
50%-60%
60%-70%
70%-80%
80%-90%
>90%
No
50%-60%
60%-70%
70%-80%
80%-90%

An abortion referendum took place in Portugal on 11 February 2007, to decide whether to legalise abortion up to ten weeks. The referendum was the fulfillment of an election pledge by the governing Socialist Party of Prime Minister José Sócrates.

Official results of the referendum showed that 59.24 percent of the Portuguese approved the proposal put on ballot, while 40.76 percent rejected it. However, only 43.61 percent of the registered voters turned out to vote. Since voter turnout was below 50 percent, according to the Portuguese Constitution, these results are not legally binding, and parliament can legally decide to disregard them. Prime Minister Sócrates nevertheless confirmed that he would expand the circumstances under which abortion was allowed, since a majority of voters had been in favour.

The law was ratified by President Aníbal Cavaco Silva on 10 April 2007. As of 2026, this is the most recent referendum held in Portugal.

== Background ==
In 1998, the legalization of abortion had also been put to a referendum. However, a small majority voted NO, 51 to 49 percent, and abortion legalization was not implemented.

== Question ==
The question in the referendum was:

"Are you in agreement with the decriminalization of the voluntary interruption of pregnancy, if carried out, by the woman's choice, in the first ten weeks in a legally authorized health institution?"

"Concorda com a despenalização da interrupção voluntária da gravidez, se realizada, por opção da mulher, nas 10 primeiras semanas, em estabelecimento de saúde legalmente autorizado?"

Under the previous law, abortions were allowed up 12 weeks if the mother's life or mental or physical health is at risk, up to 16 weeks in cases of rape and up to 24 weeks if the child may be born with an incurable disease or deformity. The new law, approved on 9 March 2007, allows abortions on request up to the tenth week.

== Political positions ==
The major parties in Portugal listed with their political positioning and their official answer to the referendum question:

- Left
  - Portuguese Communist Party – YES
  - Left Bloc – YES
  - Ecologist Party "The Greens" – YES
  - Socialist Party – YES
- Right
  - Social Democratic Party – NEUTRAL (the party was divided, however, important members, including the then leader, Luís Marques Mendes, said NO)
  - People's Party – NO

== Campaign period ==
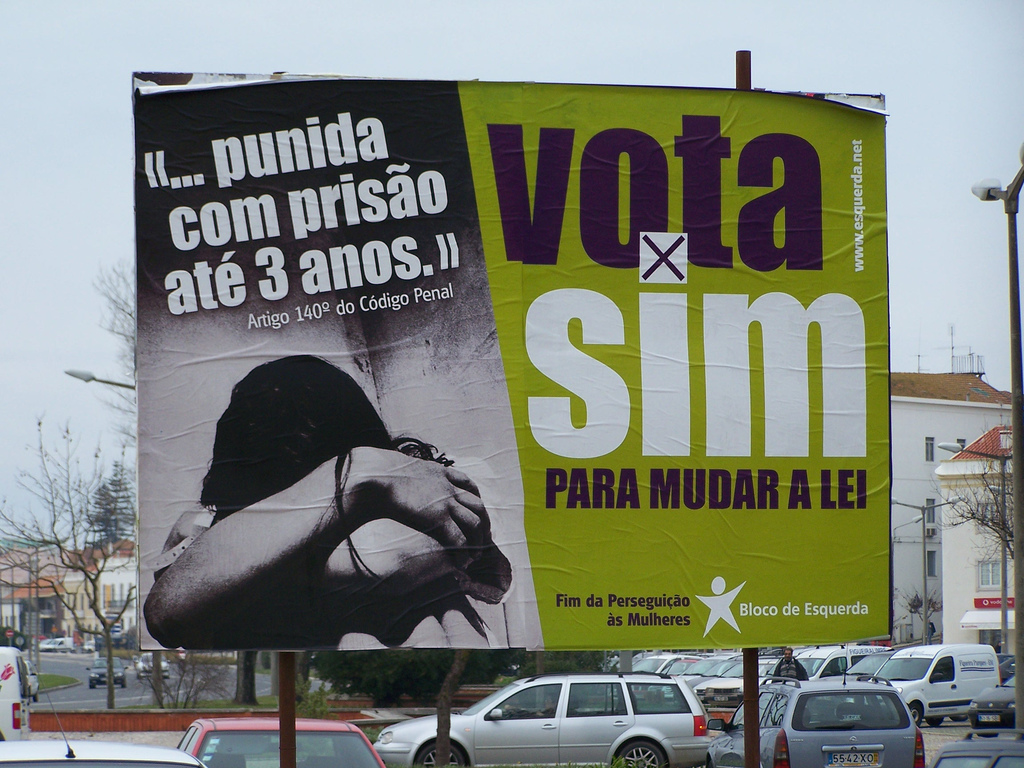
Yes poster during the campaign.

=== Choices slogans ===
Choice	Original slogan	English translation	Refs
Yes	« O voto responsável, Sim. » « Vota para acabar com a injustiça da lei. »	"Yes, the responsible vote" "Vote to end the injustice of the law."	
No	« Não, Obrigada. » « Escolhe a vida. »	"No, Thank you" "Choose Life."	

== Opinion polling ==
A December 2006 Aximage/Correio da Manhã poll had found that 61 percent of Portugal's electorate supported the proposal, 26 percent did not, and 12 percent were "not sure". An earlier survey from October 2006 had yielded similar results. However, a poll from mid-January 2007 had seen support drop to 38 to 28 percent in favour.

Exit poll

Polling Firm	Date Released	Sample size	Direct Intention of Vote				Valid Vote		
Polling Firm	Date Released	Sample size	Yes	No	Und.	Lead	Yes	No	Lead
Referendum results	11 Feb 2007	43.6	—N/a	—N/a	—N/a	—N/a	59.3	40.7	18.6
CESOP–UCP	11 Feb 2007		—N/a	—N/a	—N/a	—N/a	57–61	39–43	18
Eurosondagem	11 Feb 2007		—N/a	—N/a	—N/a	—N/a	58.0–61.8	38.2–42.0	19.8
Intercampus	11 Feb 2007		—N/a	—N/a	—N/a	—N/a	57.6–62.6	37.4–42.4	20.2
Aximage	7 Feb 2007	801	52.6	41.5	5.9	11.1	56	44	12
Eurosondagem	5 Feb 2007	2,059	46.5	41.0	12.5	6.2	53.1	46.9	5.5
TNS Eurotest	5 Feb 2007	1,000	52.8	37.1	10.1	15.7	59	41	18
CESOP–UCP	4 Feb 2007	3,806	49	34	17	15	58	42	16
Aximage	2 Feb 2007	601	51.3	43.7	5.0	7.6	54	46	8
IPOM	24 Jan 2007	697	45.6	37.2	17.2	8.4	55	45	10
CESOP–UCP	22 Jan 2007	1,257	48	35	17	13	59	41	18
Marktest	19 Jan 2007	821	54.0	33.4	12.6	20.6	61.8	38.2	23.6
Aximage	18 Jan 2007	500	55.6	29.8	14.6	25.8	65	35	30
Eurosondagem	16 Jan 2007	2,569	43	36	22	7.0	52.5	47.5	5
Aximage	9 Jan 2007	550	57.0	34.8	8.1	22.2	62	38	24
Intercampus	9 Jan 2007	1,525	60.0	29.0	11.0	31.0	67	33	34
Aximage	20 Dec 2006	502	61.0	26.7	12.3	34.3	70	30	40
Aximage	7 Dec 2006	550	64.1	27.3	8.6	36.8	70	30	40
Marktest	15 Nov 2006	808	61.2	30.0	8.8	31.2	67.1	32.9	34.2
Intercampus	24 Oct 2006	514	66.9	27.6	5.4	39.3	71	29	42
Marktest	21 Oct 2006	809	63.0	27.0	10.0	36.0	70	30	40
Eurosondagem	17 Oct 2006	1,033	46.0	39.0	16.0	7.0	51.7	48.3	3.4
CESOP–UCP	15 Oct 2006	1,282	63	25	12	38	72	28	44
Aximage	4 Oct 2006	550	47.9	39.9	12.2	8.0	55	45	10

== Results ==
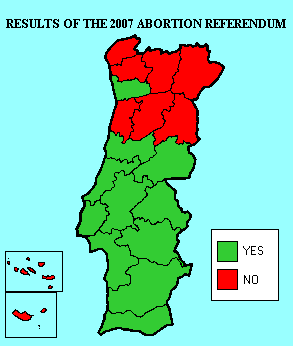
Results of the referendum by district (Islands shown).

Portuguese abortion referendum, 2007
Choice	Votes	%
For	2,231,529	59.25
Against	1,534,669	40.75
Total	3,766,198	100.00
Valid votes	3,766,198	98.07
Invalid/blank votes	73,978	1.93
Total votes	3,840,176	100.00
Registered voters/turnout	8,814,016	43.57
Source: Comissão Nacional de Eleições

Referendum results (excluding invalid votes)
Yes; 2,231,529 (59.3%)	No; 1,534,669 (40.7%)
▲50%

=== Results by district ===
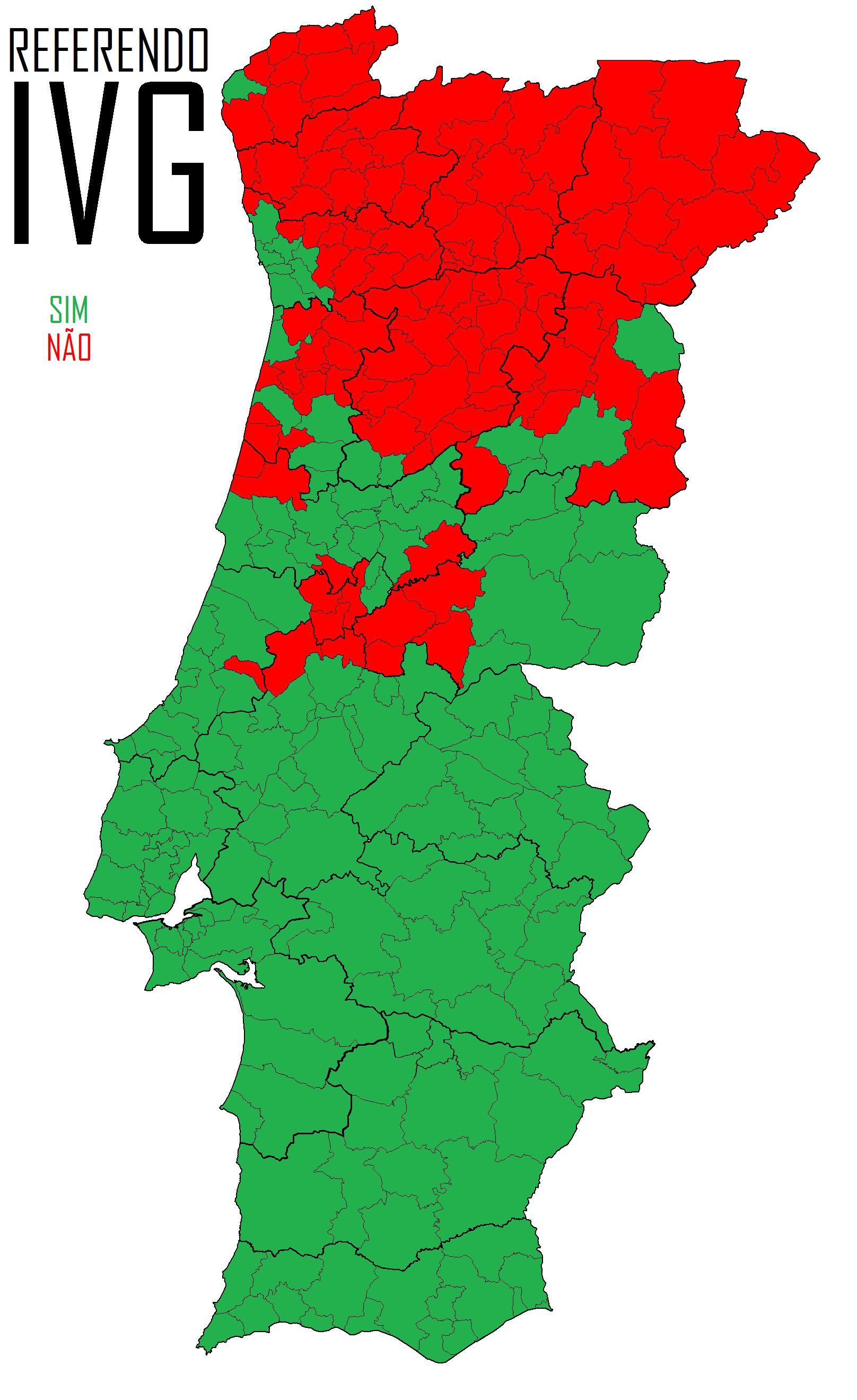
Results of the referendum in the Portuguese municipalities (Islands not shown).

District	Yes		No		Turnout
District	Votes	%	Votes	%	Turnout
Aveiro	110,644	44.62%	137,312	55.38%	42.29%
Azores	17,022	30.66%	38,489	69.34%	29.54%
Beja	45,028	83.90%	8,641	16.10%	39.82%
Braga	132,507	41.35%	187,911	58.65%	46.20%
Bragança	20,445	40.75%	29,722	59.25%	34.07%
Castelo Branco	45,976	61.65%	28,601	38.35%	40.15%
Coimbra	92,828	62.89%	54,769	37.11%	40.04%
Évora	48,274	78.38%	13,312	21.62%	43.00%
Faro	89,132	73.92%	31,440	26.08%	38.78%
Guarda	27,725	46.53%	31,865	53.47%	38.27%
Leiria	97,292	58.30%	69,585	41.70%	43.76%
Lisbon	607,419	71.47%	242,467	28.53%	48.67%
Madeira	30,209	34.60%	57,091	65.40%	38.89%
Portalegre	30,507	74.45%	10,478	25.55%	38.92%
Porto	350,868	54.36%	294,599	45.64%	44.86%
Santarém	109,051	65.11%	58,434	34.89%	44.16%
Setúbal	259,684	81.99%	57,032	18.01%	48.77%
Viana do Castelo	37,096	40.71%	54,023	59.29%	39.54%
Vila Real	28,871	38.09%	46,921	61.91%	34.28%
Viseu	50,931	38.32%	81,977	61.68%	37.71%
Source: Comissão Nacional de Eleições

== See also ==
- Abortion law
