= 1998 Portuguese abortion referendum =

- 28 June 1998
- Do you agree with the decriminalization of the voluntary interruption of the pregnancy, if it takes place in the first 10 weeks and in an authorized healthcare institution?

Results
Choice	Votes	%
Yes	1,308,130	49.09%
No	1,356,754	50.91%
Valid votes	2,664,884	98.35%
Invalid or blank votes	44,619	1.65%
Total votes	2,709,503	100.00%
Registered voters/turnout	8,496,089	31.89%
District Results
No
50-60%
60-70%
70-80%
80-90%
Yes
50-60%
60-70%
70-80%
80-90%

On 28 June 1998 a referendum on a new abortion law was conducted in Portugal; it was the second national referendum in the Portuguese history and the first after the 1974 Carnation Revolution.

The law was proposed by the Portuguese Communist Party and it decriminalized abortion during the first ten weeks of pregnancy and was considered by the left as the only way to put an end to the estimated 20 to 50 thousand illegal abortions in the country. The law was approved in the Assembly of the Republic through a majority of the center-left and left-wing parties, but an agreement between the Socialist Party and the Social Democratic Party parties leaders led to the referendum.

The referendum was held on a summer day, which is believed to have contributed to the very low turnout rate, that didn't pass the threshold of 50 percent of voters needed to make the decision binding, although the winning answer, NO, was respected and the law was not changed, meaning abortion was only allowed in exceptional case (such as rape, mal-formations of the fetus and danger to the women's health). In the following years, a few dozen women (a small minority of the estimated illegal abortions) were defendants in three trials for abortion.

A revote occurred in the 2007 Portuguese abortion referendum, where the result was reversed.

The question present in the ballots was: "Do you agree with the decriminalization of the voluntary interruption of the pregnancy, if it takes place in the first 10 weeks and in an authorized healthcare institution?"

== Political positions ==
The major parties in Portugal at the time listed with their political positioning and their official answer to the referendum question:

- Left
  - Portuguese Communist Party - YES
  - Ecologist Party "The Greens" - YES
  - Socialist Party - NEUTRAL (most of the party said YES, however, important members, including the then General-Secretary and Prime Minister António Guterres said NO)
- Right
  - Social Democratic Party - NEUTRAL (most of the party said NO, including the then party leader Marcelo Rebelo de Sousa, but high ranking members like José Pacheco Pereira said YES)
  - People's Party - NO

== Campaign period ==
=== Choices slogans ===
Choice	Original slogan	English translation	Refs
Yes	« Basta! Vota Sim. » « SIM, pela despenalização do aborto. »	"Enough! Vote Yes" "YES, for the decriminalization of abortion."	
No	« Anda, vale a pena viver. » « Aborto a pedido? Não, obrigado. »	"Come on, life is worth living" "Abortion on demand? No thanks."	

== Opinion polling ==
All polls published showed an advantage for the YES side, but official results showed a 51 to 49 percent win for the NO side. Late deciders and a low turnout may explain this result. Note, until 2000, the publication of opinion polls in the last week of the campaign was forbidden.

Exit poll

Polling Firm	Date Released	Sample size	Direct Intention of Vote				Valid Vote		
Polling Firm	Date Released	Sample size	Yes	No	Und.	Lead	Yes	No	Lead
Referendum results	28 Jun 1998	31.9	—N/a	—N/a	—N/a	—N/a	49.1	50.9	1.8
UCP	28 Jun 1998		—N/a	—N/a	—N/a	—N/a	47–53	46–52	1
UCP	19 Jun 1998	3,123	—N/a	—N/a	—N/a	—N/a	53.2	46.8	6.4
Metris	17 Jun 1998	1,006	44.4	41.6	13.4	2.8	52	48	2
Moderna	14 Jun 1998	1,441	54.4	35.5	10.1	18.9	61	39	22
SIC/Visão	9 Jun 1998	843	58.1	40.0	1.9	18.1	59	41	18
Euroexpansão	27 May 1998	644	81	13	6	68.0	86	14	72
Moderna	24 May 1998	1,434	55.6	33.1	11.4	22.5	63	37	26
SIC/Visão	21 May 1998	2,007	60.9	36.7	2.5	24.2	62	38	24
Metris	20 May 1998	1,008	46.9	43.9	9.1	3.0	52	48	4
UCP	5 May 1998	1,293	60.9	30.3	8.8	30.6	67	33	34
SIC/Visão	1 May 1998	709	63.1	35.3	1.6	27.8	64	36	28
Metris	8 Apr 1998	1,998	48.7	41.3	9.9	7.4	54	46	8

== Results ==
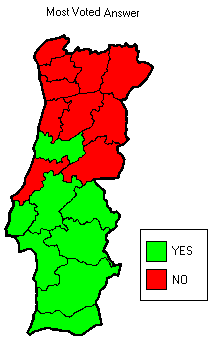
Most voted answer per district (Azores and Madeira not shown).

Portuguese abortion referendum, 1998
Choice	Votes	%
For	1,308,130	49.09
Against	1,356,754	50.91
Total	2,664,884	100.00
Valid votes	2,664,884	98.35
Invalid/blank votes	44,619	1.65
Total votes	2,709,503	100.00
Registered voters/turnout	8,496,089	31.89
Source: Comissão Nacional de Eleições

Referendum results (excluding invalid votes)
Yes; 1,308,130 (49.1%)	No; 1,356,754 (50.9%)
▲50%

=== Results by district ===
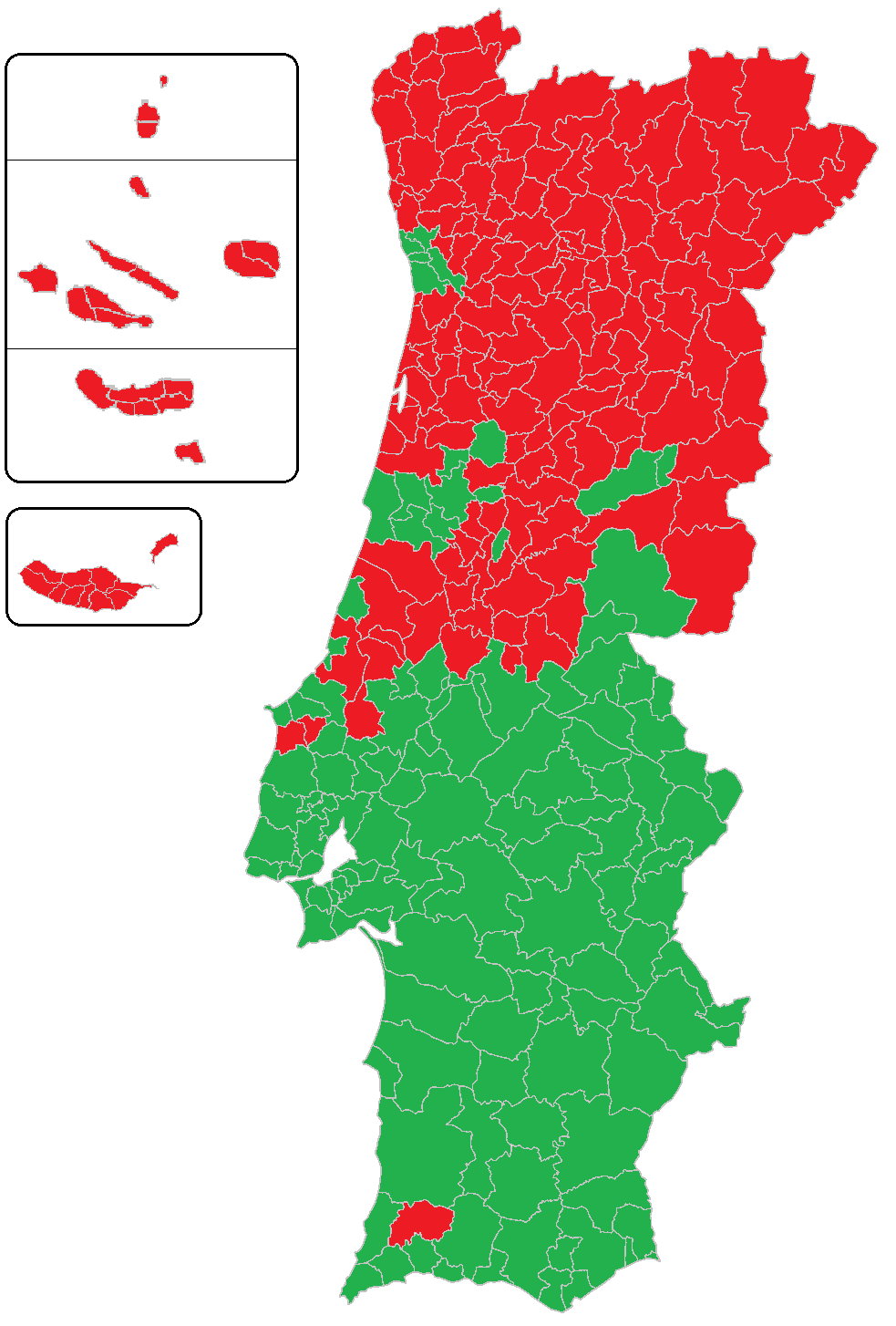
Most voted answer by municipality.

District	Yes		No		Turnout
District	Votes	%	Votes	%	Turnout
Aveiro	53,657	32.27%	112,621	67.73%	30.63%
Azores	8,422	17.20%	40,545	82.80%	27.21%
Beja	25,477	78.17%	7,114	21.83%	22.96%
Braga	55,770	22.73%	189,555	77.27%	39.55%
Bragança	10,899	26.25%	30,621	73.75%	28.58%
Castelo Branco	25,341	47.22%	28,330	52.78%	28.78%
Coimbra	52,487	52.94%	46,649	47.06%	27.33%
Évora	28,137	72.98%	10,417	27.02%	21.62%
Faro	46,519	69.59%	20,331	30.41%	22.38%
Guarda	15,836	29.89%	37,145	70.11%	31.99%
Leiria	50,939	48.26%	54,612	51.74%	29.40%
Lisbon	416,285	68.51%	191,342	31.49%	34.36%
Madeira	15,681	23.97%	49,733	76.03%	32.76%
Portalegre	17,879	67.78%	8,537	32.32%	24.14%
Porto	192,100	42.38%	261,211	57.62%	33.39%
Santarém	63,273	56.57%	48,581	43.43%	29.83%
Setúbal	169,742	81.89%	37,534	18.11%	33.37%
Viana do Castelo	19,365	26.21%	54,506	73.79%	34.09%
Vila Real	15,907	26.97%	50,453	76.03%	31.28%
Viseu	24,891	24.22%	77,861	75.78%	30.37%
Source: Direcção Geral da Administração Interna

== See also ==
- Abortion by country
