= Arrington =

Arrington may refer to:

== Places ==
- Arrington, Cambridgeshire, a village in England
- Arrington, Kansas
- Arrington, Virginia
- Arrington Township, Wayne County, Illinois
- Arrington, Tennessee
- Arrington Ice Arena, arena on the campus of Adrian College

== People with the surname ==
=== Football players ===
- LaVar Arrington (born 1978), American football player
- LaVar Arrington II (born 2007), American football player
- J. J. Arrington (born 1983), American football player
- Adrian Arrington (born 1985), American football player
- Dick Arrington (1942–1993), American football guard
- Rick Arrington (1947–2021), American football player
- Kyle Arrington (born 1986), American football player
- Arrington Jones (born 1959), American football player

=== Politicians ===
- Richard Arrington Jr. (born 1934), American politician
- Richard Olney Arrington (1897–1963), Justice of the Supreme Court of Mississippi
- Arrington Dixon, American politician
- Archibald Hunter Arrington (1809–1872), American former Congressman
- Archibald Hunter Arrington Williams (1842–1895), American former Congressman
- Jodey Arrington (born 1972), American politician, current Congressman for Texas's 19th congressional district
- John B. Arrington (1919–2001), American politician
- Katie Arrington (born 1970), American politician
- Kristen Arrington (born 1975), American politician
- Marvin S. Arrington Sr. (1941–2023), American judge and politician
- W. Russell Arrington (1906–1979), American politician

=== Musicians ===
- Steve Arrington (born 1956), American musician
- Charisse Arrington, R&B singer
- Joe Tex (born Joseph Arrington Jr., 1935–1982), American songwriter
- Vast Aire (born Theodore Arrington, born 1978), American rap artist and part of group Cannibal Ox
- Arrington de Dionyso (born 1970s), Washington-based artist and experimental musician

=== Race car drivers ===
- Buddy Arrington (1938–2022), American race car driver
- Joey Arrington (born 1956), American race car driver

=== Other ===
- Michael Arrington (born 1970), American venture capital and start-up technology blogger
- John Arrington, American physicist
- Leonard J. Arrington (1917–1999), American religious author
- Jill Arrington (born 1972), American football reporter
- Robert Arrington (1938–2015), American philosopher
- Marie Dean Arrington (1933–2014), American criminal
- Alanna Arrington (born 1998), American model
- Elayne Arrington, American mathematician and engineer
- James Arrington, American stage actor, director, playwright and scholar
- Yasmine Arrington (born 1993), businessman
- Kristi Arrington, American professional golfer
- Lillie Arrington, American stage actress
- Nyesha Arrington, reality show contestant
