= List of black fashion models =

The following is a list of black fashion models.

== A ==
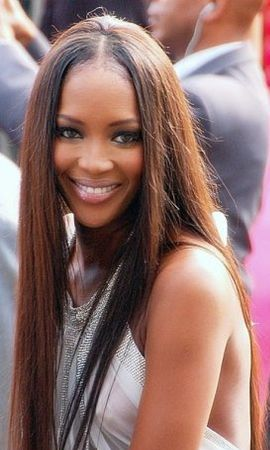
Naomi Campbell

- Iman Abdulmajid – Somali top model who was the muse of many top designers, especially Yves Saint Laurent.
- Adwoa Aboah – British fashion model who has appeared on the cover of American Vogue, British Vogue, Vogue Italia, TIME, and Allure
- Aweng Ade-Chuol – South Sudanese model.
- Adesuwa Aighewi – African-American model of Chinese and Nigerian descent. She has modeled for Chanel, Louis Vuitton, and Dior.
- J. Alexander – model, runway coach and America's Next Top Model judge. Walked for Jean Paul Gaultier.
- Karen Alexander – African-American fashion model and actress. Has appeared in the Sports Illustrated Swimsuit Issue twice and on the January 1989 cover of Vogue.
- Leomie Anderson – British model who is currently a Victoria's Secret Angel.
- Alanna Arrington – African-American (biracial) model who has been on the cover of Maxim and Elle U.K. She has walked the Victoria’s Secret Fashion Show since 2016.
- Yasmine Arrington – professional plus-size or curvy fashion model and motivational speaker.

== B ==
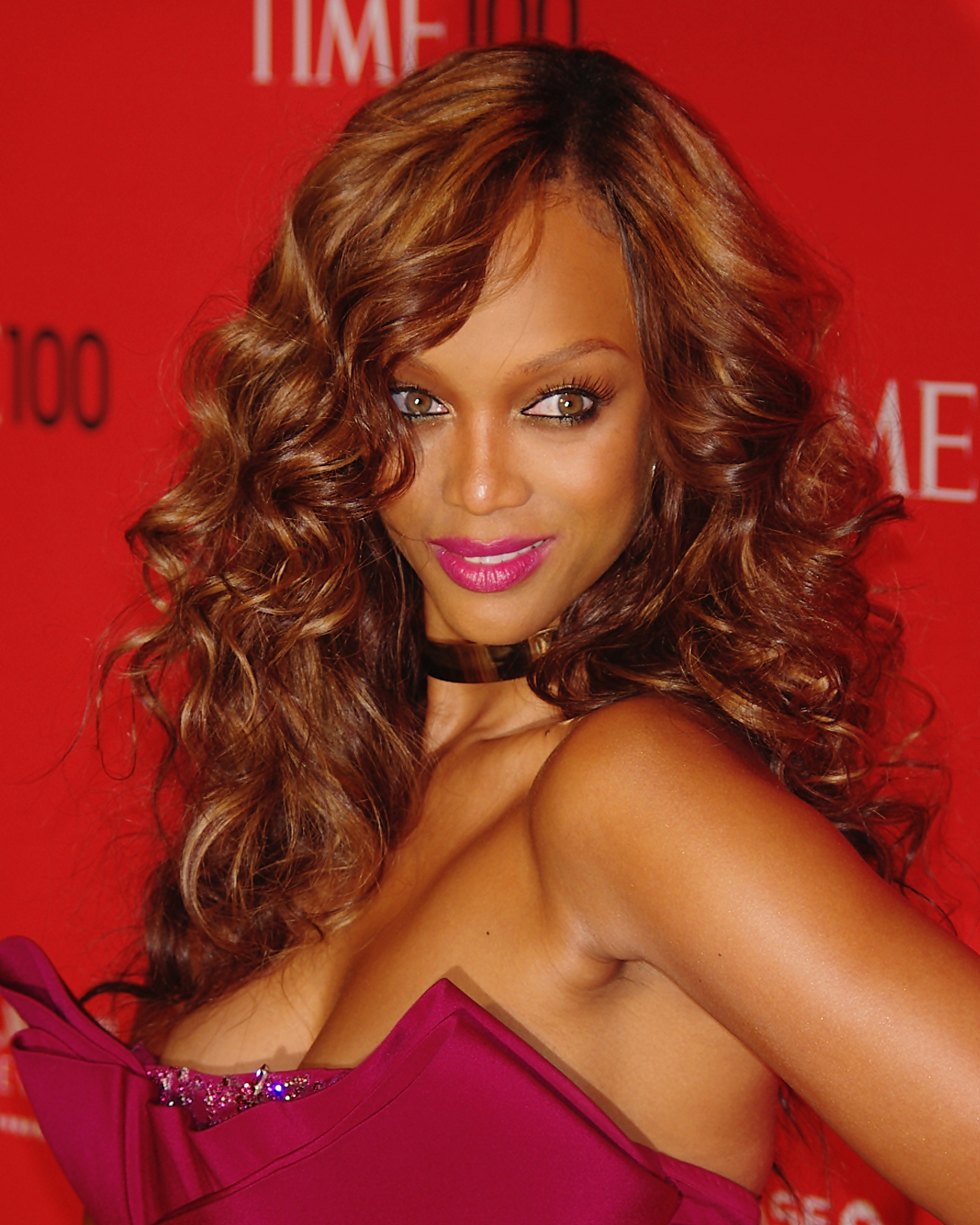
Tyra Banks, chosen by Time in 2008 as one of the world's 100 most influential people.

- Cynthia Bailey – African-American model and television personality of The Real Housewives of Atlanta.
- Tyra Banks – first African-American to grace the covers of GQ and the Sports Illustrated's Sports Illustrated Swimsuit Issue and become a Victoria's Secret Angel. Host/creator of America's Next Top Model.

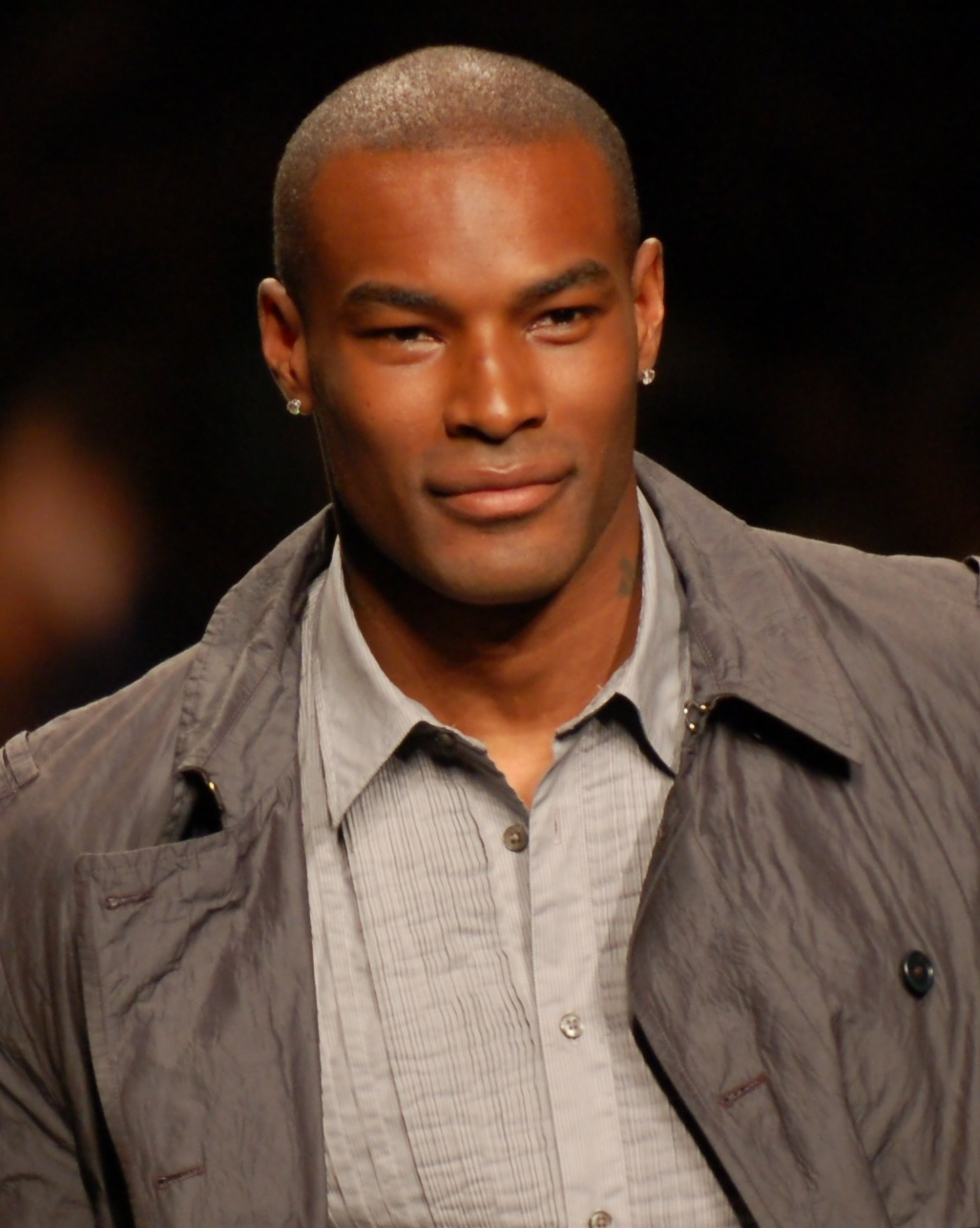
Tyson Beckford, chosen by music cable network Vh1 as "Man of the Year" in 1995.

- Tyson Beckford – top male model of the 1990s and 2000s, actor and host of Bravo's Make Me a Supermodel. Beckford was the first African-American model to sign an exclusive contract with Ralph Lauren. In 1995, he was chosen as "Man of the Year" by cable television music network Vh1 and named to People's 50 Most Beautiful People in the World list.
- Shari Belafonte – model of the 1980s.
- Yasmin Benoit – English model and asexual activist specializing in alternative fashion and lingerie
- Samile Bermannelli – Brazilian model who has walked for Ralph Lauren, Valentino, and Fendi.
- Minah Ogbenyealu Bird – Nigerian model and actress active in the UK in the 1970s. Appeared in such films as Percy's Progress, The Stud and The London Connection.
- Maria Borges – Angolan model who booked 17 shows during her first season since being discovered back in 2012. Borges has since walked for Dior and Givenchy, even referring to the fashion house's Creative Director Riccardo Tisci as her "godfather". In 2013, 2014, and 2015 she walked the Victoria's Secret Fashion Show.
- Cindy Bruna – French model of Congolese and Italian descent, who has appeared on the runways of DVF, Ralph Lauren, and Donna Karan. Bruna is the third woman of color to ever appear in a Prada print campaign.

== C ==
- Naomi Campbell – British model of Jamaican descent who was the first to grace the covers of French Vogue Paris (August 1988 issue) and Time magazine (TIME Magazine Europe 9/18/91), and the second for the cover of British Vogue (December 1987 issue).
- Chase Carter – Bahamian model of biracial heritage, she has been on the cover of Maxim.
- Dorothea Church – African-American pioneering model. She was the first successful black fashion model in Paris.
- Pat Cleveland – African-American model of the 1970s who was the muse of Halston, Yves Saint Laurent and Stephen Burrows.

== D ==
- Yaya DaCosta – African-American actress and fashion model. Runner-up in Cycle 3 of America's Next Top Model.
- Elibeidy Dani – Dominican model who has walked for Prada and Burberry.
- Agbani Darego – Nigerian model and winner of Miss World competition 2001. She worked for brands such as L'Oréal cosmetics.
- Bruce Darnell – American model who modeled for Calvin Klein, Hermès, Issey Miyake and Kenzo. Former judge of Germany's Next Topmodel and Germany's Das Supertalent and coach for Switzerland's Top Model.
- Ebonee Davis – African-American model who was a finalist on America’s Next Top Model. She has appeared in Vogue and ads for Calvin Klein, L’Oréal, Pantene, and MAC Cosmetics.
- Naki Depass – Jamaican model who debuted as an exclusive at Burberry, Prada, Céline, and also walked for Givenchy.
- Ajak Deng – Sudanese model who walked recent runways in Paris, booking high-end designer shows, including Lanvin, Givenchy and Jean Paul Gaultier.
- Ataui Deng – Sudanese model who walked the runways for John Galliano and Christian Dior.
- Nadège du Bospertus – French model who was the muse of Gianni Versace and Giorgio Armani in the early '90s.
- Peggy Dillard - American model who was the second Black woman featured on the cover of Vogue (magazine).
- Khoudia Diop – Senegalese model who calls herself the "Melanin Goddess" because of her dark skin tone.
- Waris Dirie – Somalian model active in the late '80s and early '90s who is also an activist against female circumcision.She appeared in the Pirelli Calendar with a sixteen year old Naomi Campbell. She wrote a book "The Desert flower", adapted in a movie, her role played by Liya Kebede.
- Jourdan Dunn – British model of Jamaican descent, who has walked for major runways like Prada and Chanel and landing a solo cover of British Vogue – first black model in 12 years to do so. Worked for brands such as Versace, Burberry, Beats Electronics and Maybelline.

== E ==
- Selita Ebanks – former Victoria's Secret Angel. Has also modeled for Abercrombie & Fitch and Tommy Hilfiger.
- Paloma Elsesser – British-born African-American model, also of Chilean and Swiss descent. She has been on the cover of British Vogue and muse to Pat McGrath.
- Cora Emmanuel – Martinique-born model who has walked the runways of Chanel, Bottega Veneta, Prada, and Carolina Herrera.
- Amilna Estêvão – Angolan model who was a runner-up in the Elite Model Look contest; she has walked for Prada, Gucci, and Givenchy.
- Danielle Evans – winner of America's Next Top Model, Cycle 6'. She has had campaigns for CoverGirl, Sephora, and Akademiks.

== F ==
- Tomiko Fraser – African-American fashion model and actress. Best known for being the face of Maybelline as well as her role in the movie, Head Over Heels.
- Malaika Firth – Kenyan model from London. First black model to appear in a Prada campaign in 19 years.
- Selena Forrest – A new face, Forrest made her runway debut Spring 2016 and opened for Proenza Schouler.

== G ==
- Quiana Grant – African-American model. Appeared in the 2008 Sports Illustrated Swimsuit Issue.

== H ==
- Halima Aden - the first model to wear a hijab at the Miss Minnesota USA
- Winnie Harlow – appeared in magazines such as i-D and Dazed. Modeled for fashion website Showstudio.com, Diesel. Also appeared in commercial shoots for Nick Knight, Ebony, Sprite. Chosen as one of BBC's 100 Women. Diagnosed with vitiligo.
- Tanisha Harper – African-American model, actress and television host. Appeared in The Bold and the Beautiful and ABC's Ugly Betty.
- Danielle Herrington – second African-American model to appear on the cover of Sports Illustrated Swimsuit Issue.
- Ubah Hassan - Somalian-Canadian model and business woman who started her long career with a Ralph Lauren campaign. Then she worked with the best designers/photographers. She is one of the stars in RHONY.
- Marsha A. Hunt – African-American model, singer, novelist, and actress.
- Beverley Heath Hoyland – Jamaican-British model and businesswoman.
- Whitney Houston - second African-American model to appear on the cover of Seventeen (November 1981) and first black singer to appear on the cover of Harper's Bazaar (January 1996).

== I ==
- Chanel Iman – Korean/African-American who has modeled for Dolce & Gabbana, Issey Miyake, Kenzo, Marc Jacobs, Valentino, Bottega Veneta, DSquared², Hermès, Moschino, Oscar de la Renta, Jean Paul Gaultier, and Stella McCartney. The only black woman to grace the cover of the May 2007 issue of American Vogue with nine other girls as the next generation of supermodels.

== J ==
- Beverly Johnson – American model and actress. The first Black model to grace the covers of American Vogue in 1974 and French Elle in 1975.
- Kidada Jones – African-American actress, model, and fashion designer. Appeared in Tommy Hilfiger advertisements, and dated Tupac Shakur at the time of his death.
- Toccara Jones – African-American fashion model and occasional actress and television personality. Contestant on the third season of the UPN series America's Next Top Model. She is the first black plus-size model to grace the pages of Vogue Italia.
- Grace Jones – Jamaican-American model, actress, singer and a muse to Andy Warhol.

== K ==
- Kiara Kabukuru – American fashion model of Ugandan descent who has appeared in ads for Gucci and CoverGirl cosmetics. She also graced the cover of American Vogue in 1997.
- Sabina Karlsson – Afro-Swedish plus size model. She has modeled for Michael Kors, Armani, and Maybelline.
- Liya Kebede – Ethiopian-born model, maternal health advocate, clothing designer and actress. She has appeared on the cover of Vogue three times.
- Jayne Kennedy – American television personality, actress, model, corporate spokeswoman, producer, writer, public speaker, philanthropist, beauty pageant titleholder and sports broadcaster. Kennedy won a 1982 NAACP Image Award for Outstanding Actress in a Motion Picture award for her performance as Julie Winters in the 1981 film Body and Soul co-starring alongside her then–husband Leon Isaac Kennedy.
- Kenya Kinski-Jones – American model and daughter of musician Quincy Jones and German model-actress Nastassja Kinski. She has modeled for Calvin Klein, Stella McCartney, Chanel, and appeared in Vogue.
- Katiti Kironde – first African-American covergirl of a women's magazine in the Glamour August 1968 college issue.
- Subah Koj – Australian model of Sudanese descent. She walked in the 2018 Victoria's Secret Fashion Show.

== L ==
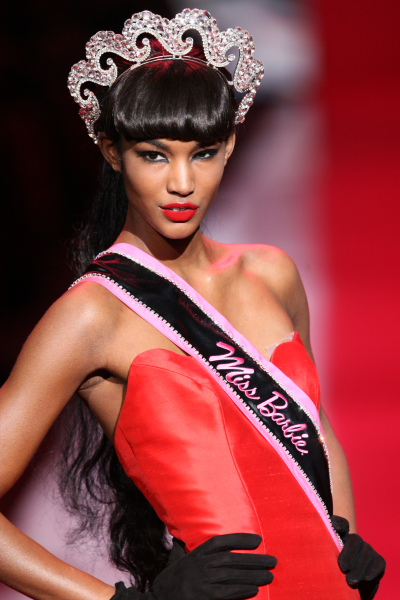
Sessilee Lopez at the Barbie 50th Anniversary Collection

- Carol LaBrie – American dancer, model, and actress. She was the first black model to appear on the cover of Vogue Italia in 1971, and she was a Warhol superstar.
- Janet Langhart – African-American model, television journalist and author.
- Shakara Ledard – model and actress, originally from The Bahamas. She has posed for Sports Illustrated Swimsuit Issue as well as for Maxim Magazine.
- Elizabeth and Victoria Lejonhjärta – Swedish twin models of Gambian, Senegalese, and Sápmi descent. They have modeled for Calvin Klein, H&M, Max Factor, and appeared in Vogue.
- Noémie Lenoir – French model of Malagasy descent who has appeared in ads for L'Oréal, Gap, and other well-known companies. Has graced the covers of many fashion magazines worldwide and was a Victoria's Secret Angel.
- Sessilee Lopez – Dominican who has appeared in Vogue Italia in its famous black issue, as well as walking in the 2008 Victoria's Secret Fashion Show.
- Donyale Luna – American fashion model and actress. She was the first black model to appear on the cover of Harper's Bazaar (in illustration) in 1965 and British Vogue, and she was a Warhol superstar.
- Damaris Lewis – African-American model who appeared in the Sports Illustrated Swimsuit Issue in 2009, 2010, and 2011.
- Genesis Lynea – Bermudian-born actress and model, ambassador for Adidas
- Leomie Anderson – English model who is a Victoria's Secret Angel

== M ==
- Grace Mahary - Eritrean-Canadian model.
- Anais Mali – French model of Chadian and Polish heritage. Walked for Marc Jacobs, Vera Wang, Derek Lam, Vivienne Westwood, Cynthia Rowley, Carolina Herrera. Joined the Angels for Victoria's Secret Fashion Show 2011.
- Eva Marcille – first African-American to win the reality show America's Next Top Model.
- Denny Méndez – former beauty queen turned model and actress who represented Italy in the 1997 Miss Universe pageant.
- Ariel Meredith – African-American model who appeared several times in the pages of Sports Illustrated Swimsuit Issue.
- Nayma Mingas – Angolan-Portuguese model who has appeared on magazines such as Máxima.
- Riley Montana — African-American model who appeared in campaigns for Tom Ford
- Lineisy Montero – Dominican model who debuted as a Prada exclusive.
- Naima Mora – winner of America's Next Top Model, Cycle 4.
- Licett Morillo — Dominican model who has been a Prada exclusive and on the cover of Vogue Mexico.

== N ==
- Ajuma Nasenyana – Kenyan model who has appeared in catalogs for Issey Miyake and walked the runway for Baby Phat, Ungaro, Vivienne Westwood and the 2006 show for Victoria's Secret.
- Katoucha Niane – A Senegalese-French model and outspoken activist against female circumcision.
- Mayowa Nicholas – A model who won Nigeria's round of Elite Model Look back in 2014, but Fall 2016 was her breakout season. Appearing on the runway of Miu Miu alongside Adriana Lima; and walking the shows of Dior and Prada.
- Munachi Nwankwo – Nigerian model and hip-hop artist. Won Most Beautiful Girl in Nigeria pageant in 2007.

== O ==
- Lola Odusoga – Nigerian-Finnish model and first black Miss Finland.
- Lana Ogilvie – Canadian model seen in frequent CoverGirl ads in the 1990s.Also profiled in 1994 Sports Illustrated Swimsuit Issue.
- Gail O'Neill – African-American fashion model who has become a television journalist. Appeared in the Sports Illustrated Swimsuit Issue. Continues to model actively as of 2009.
- Oluchi Onweagba – Nigerian model and winner of M-NET/Nokia 'Face of Africa' competition 1998. She has featured in multiple ad campaigns, including Gianfranco Ferré, Victoria's Secret, Express, Banana Republic, and Ann Taylor.

== P ==
- Emanuela de Paula – Brazilian top model, who ranked the 11th highest paid supermodel for 2009, earning $2.5 million according to Forbes. De Paula has also been praised by Naomi Campbell and Anna Wintour of Vogue.
- Beverly Peele – first African-American to grace the cover of Mademoiselle in 1989.
- Daisi Pollard – Crowned Miss Jamaica International in 2005.

== R ==
- Lais Ribeiro – Brazilian model. In 2009, she started modelling locally and shortly afterwards walked the major international catwalks for such designers as Chanel, Louis Vuitton, Gucci, Dolce & Gabbana, Versace, and Marc Jacobs. In 2015, she became a Victoria's Secret Angel.
- Georgianna Robertson – Jamaican model in the 1990s. Cover of Vogue Paris, 1996, and appeared in editorials for ELLE, Town & Country. Walked for designers in the 1990s including Carolina Herrera, Jean Paul Gaultier, Ralph Lauren, Thierry Mugler, Chanel, and Yves Saint Laurent Haute Couture (Spring / Summer 2001, Spring / Summer 2002)
- Shaun Ross – albino male model, who has appeared in editorials for Vogue Italia and i-D and modeled for Alexander McQueen and Givenchy.

== S ==
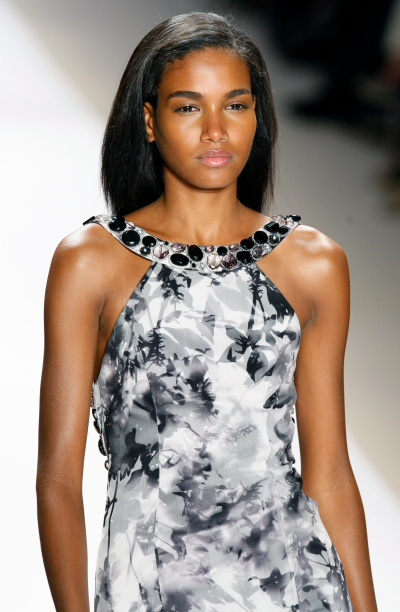
Arlenis Sosa, Dominican fashion model, at the Carlos Miele Spring 2009 Collection

- Jasmine Sanders – German-American model and media personality who has worked for Nike Inc., Roberto Cavalli, Reebok, Victoria’s Secret, Ralph Lauren and appeared in Vogue and Vogue Italia.
- Lyndsey Scott – American fashion model who in 2009 was the first model of color to score an exclusive with Calvin Klein.
- Bre Scullark – third runner-up of America's Next Top Model, Cycle 5
- Fatima Siad - The Somalian-American started her model career in American Next Top Model Cycle 10, she didn't win but she worked immediately in the industry. She landed a Ralph Lauren campaign, she worked with Etam in Paris, she made the Paris Haute Couture shows each years, catalogs, ads.
- Kimora Lee Simmons – American fashion model, author, and former president and Creative Director for Phat Fashions. She is of African-American and Japanese heritage.
- Naomi Sims – model of the late 1960s and 1970s. The first African-American model to appear on the cover of Ladies Home Journal and Life Magazine in the 1960s. She later went on to write beauty books and created her own line of cosmetics and wigs.
- Mercedes Scelba-Shorte – runner-up of America's Next Top Model in Cycle 2
- Joan Smalls – Puerto Rican fashion model.
- B. Smith – Pennsylvania native began her career with the Ebony Fashion Show and went on to grace the cover of Mademoiselle in July 1976. Currently a successful entrepreneur.
- Toukie Smith – African-American actress and model. Sister of late fashion designer Willi Smith and former long-term partner of actor Robert De Niro.
- Arlenis Sosa – Dominican model who has graced the cover of Time Magazine, and has walked many runways, such as Derek Lam and Diane von Fürstenberg.
- Saleisha Stowers – winner of America's Next Top Model, Cycle 9.

== T ==
- Duckie Thot – Australian model of Sudanese descent. She has modeled for Oscar de la Renta, the Victoria’s Secret Fashion Show, and Balmain.
- Jasmine Tookes – current Victoria's Secret Angel.
- Mona Tougaard – Danish model of Somali, Ethiopian, and Turkish descent; has appeared on the cover of British Vogue and has modeled for Fendi, Chanel, Louis Vuitton, and Dior.

== V ==
- Louise Vyent – Dutch-born model popular in the 1990s. Featured in the 1990 Sports Illustrated Swimsuit Issue. Featured on multiple Glamour magazine covers.

== W ==
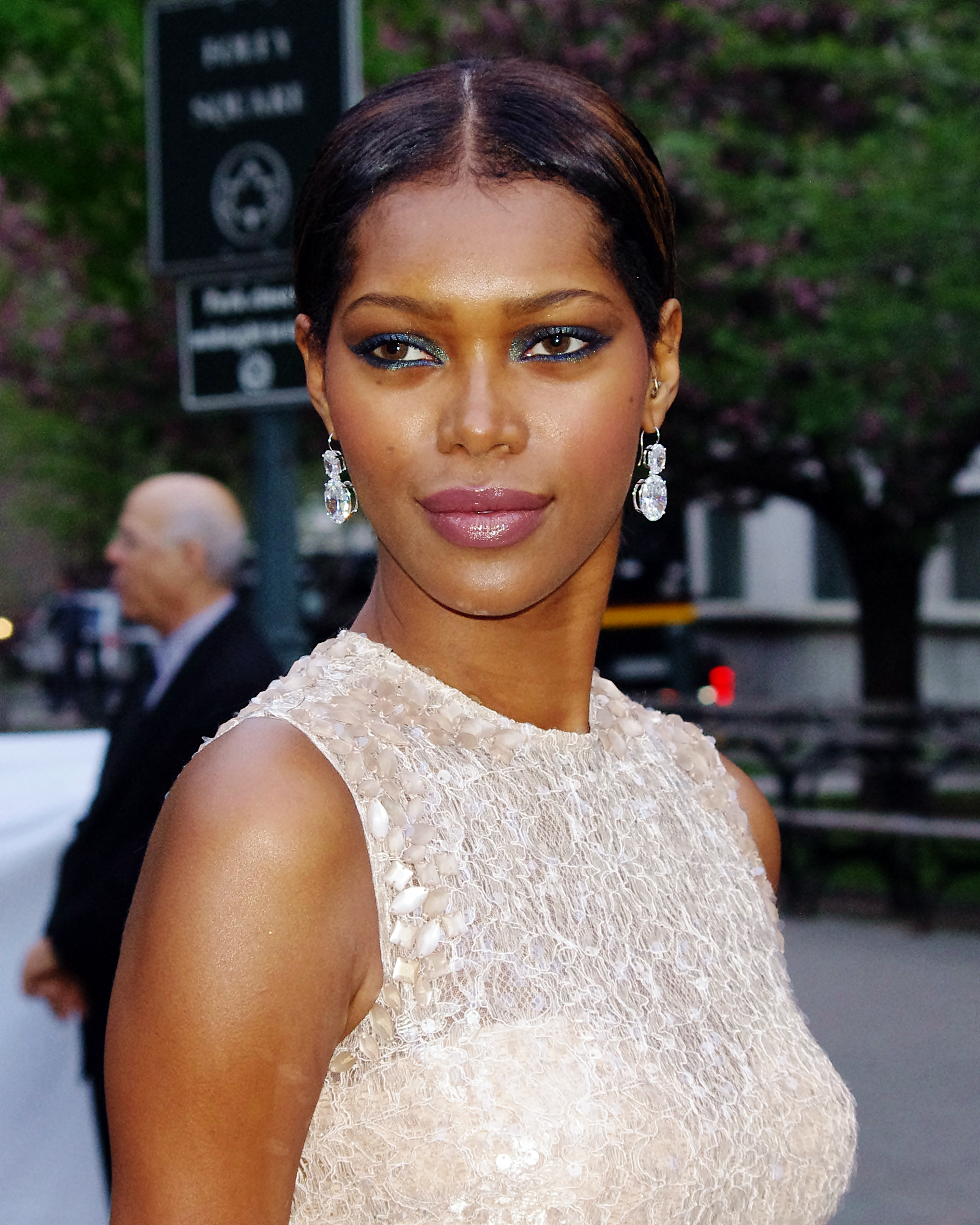
Jessica White at Vanity Fair party

- Eugena Washington – African-American model who was 2017’s Playboy Playmate of the Year. Second runner-up on America's Next Top Model, Cycle 7.
- Veronica Webb – first Black model who signed with a major cosmetics company (Revlon).
- Alek Wek – Sudanese model who, aside from gracing magazine covers and being featured in ad campaigns, has walked the runway for high-profile fashion designers such as John Galliano, Donna Karan, and Calvin Klein.
- Ari Westphal – Brazilian model of African, Italian, and German descent. She has modeled for Chanel, Sephora, and Tom Ford.
- Jessica White – African-American Maybelline Cosmetics model and occasional actress.
- Jeneil Williams – Jamaican model who has modeled for Nike, L'Oréal, Balenciaga, and appeared in Vogue Italia.
- Roshumba Williams – African-American model, actress, television host, and correspondent and reality show judge. First became internationally famous for her appearance in the prestigious Sports Illustrated Swimsuit Edition.
- Slick Woods – African-American model who has appeared in Vogue, the Pirelli calendar, and the cover of Elle U.K.

== Y ==
- Anok Yai – African-American model of Sudanese descent; the first African-American model to open for Prada
- Kara Young – California-born model popular in the 1990s. Landed the coveted Vogue cover on three occasions.
