= Naki =

Naki may refer to:

== People ==
- Deniz Naki (born 1989), German footballer
- Hamilton Naki (1926–2005), South African surgeon
- Honorine Dossou Naki (born 1946), Gabonese politician and diplomat
- Naki Akarobettoe (born 1984), American poet
- Naki Depass, Jamaican fashion model
- Naki Keykurun (1883–1967), Azerbaijani political figure

== Other uses ==
- Naki language, a language of Cameroon and Nigeria
- Naki language (Papuan), a language of Papua, Indonesia
- Naki, Iran, a village in Iran
- Taranaki Rugby Football Union, or Naki, a New Zealand rugby organisation

== See also ==
- Naqi (disambiguation)
- Nakki (disambiguation)
