= Ain't No Love =

Ain't No Love may refer to:

- "Ain't No Love" (Charisse Arrington song), 1997
- "Ain't No Love (Ain't No Use)", a song by Sub Sub, 1993
- "Ain't No Love", a song by David Gray from Life in Slow Motion, 2005
- "Ain't No Love", a song by Future and Metro Boomin from We Don't Trust You, 2024
