= Naomi Jon =

German singer-songwriter and influencer

- Born: Naomi Jonzeck; 6 December 1996 (age 29); Göttingen, Germany
- Genre: pop
- Occupations: Singer-songwriter; YouTuber; Influencer; Entrepreneur
- Instrument: Vocals
- Years active: 2016–present
- Label: Jon Records
- Website: naomijon.de

Naomi Jonzeck, better known as Naomi Jon, (born 6 December 1996) is a German singer-songwriter and social media personality. She first gained public attention through beauty and lifestyle related content on YouTube and TikTok before establishing a professional music career. Jon's transition from online content creation to music has been covered by German entertainment and lifestyle media, including WEB.DE and Promiflash.

== Early life ==
Naomi Jon was born in Göttingen, Germany. She later studied media design, which influenced her visual approach to online content and creative projects.

Before her social media career took off, Jon completed a three-year apprenticeship as a media designer and worked a standard 9-to-5 job. Jon credits this for keeping her grounded as her online presence grew.

Jon spent a year abroad in England during her youth, which was an experience she credited with giving her the confidence to later produce her content in English to reach a global audience.

== Career ==
=== 2016–2020: Online content and early ventures ===
Despite being German, Jon produces content in English. This decision was influenced by her early days on Musical.ly, (now TikTok) where most of her initial comments were in English. Jon began uploading videos to YouTube in 2016, focusing on makeup, fashion, and lifestyle topics. Her experimental visual style contributed to the growth of her audience, particularly on TikTok. Her rise as a social media personality has been discussed in mainstream German media.

Jon's massive breakthrough came from a viral video posted in 2018. Jon uploaded a video titled "i tried giving myself semi permanent freckles and now i wanna cry", where she accidentally dyed semi-permanent henna freckles onto her face and couldn't remove them, gaining over 10 million views and defining her channel's experimental and unfiltered style.

During this period, Jon launched the fashion brand Unprofashional, which focused on streetwear-inspired clothing and merchandise. The brand was later discontinued.

In September 2020, Jon released a collaboration with Melody Lashes. This collection featured four styles of vegan, cruelty-free and hand-knotted synthetic false eyelashes.

=== 2021–2023: Music debut and entrepreneurial expansion ===
During the COVID-19 pandemic, Jon began recording music independently. Her debut single, NAOMI, was released in June 2021, marking her first official music release.

Alongside her music career, Jon expanded into entrepreneurial ventures. In 2022, she released her first two fragrances, Bite Me and Kiss Me. In 2023, she released her third fragranceTaboo. These releases coincided with the thematic aesthetics of her music during that period.

Her public profile during these years extended beyond music; she was featured in lifestyle and fashion media such as Vogue Germany, where she appeared in the publication's "In the Bag" video series.

=== 2024: Villain Of Your Dreams ===
On August 16, 2024, Jon released her debut studio album, Villain Of Your Dreams. The album reached number seven on the German Albums Chart and incorporated pop and electronic music elements. Jon takes pride in being a self-funded and independent artist. She describes her music career as a high-investment passion projection where she can retain full creative control.

The album was accompanied by a European tour. Coverage of the tour appeared in industry publications, including TPi Magazine, which discussed production and live-sound aspects of her performances.

To coincide with her debut album, Jon launched her fourth fragrance Villain.

Jon released another collaboration with Melody Lashes in November 2024, releasing two primary products of a black and blue liquid eyeliner pens.

=== 2025–present: Continued projects ===
In 2025, Jon released the fifth fragrance Tempt Me. In 2026, she released her second studio album Strawberry on March 20, the album went on to chart at 12th on the German charts. The same year she released the sixth fragrance Strawberry Cloud.

== Public image ==
Jon's style is a mix of experimental makeup, high energy fashion and her evolving hair which she describes as her creative universe. Jon is famous for her extensive wig collection, which she often showcases in her online videos. Her looks involve vibrant pink hair transformations, often in wigs with long straight styles with fringes.

On her YouTube channel, she has a series known as the "Shabby Shaloon", the name of her home hair studio. The studio is the setting for her popular DIY hair transformation videos. It represents the unprofessional side of Jon's beauty content where she will experiment with bleaching, cutting or dyeing her own hair.

Jon is recognised for her creative, high-energy and often chaotic online persona. She initially gained her online attention through her artistic makeup looks which often featured bright colours and a unique artistic expression.

Her clothing style is described as a bold mix of kawaii, Y2K streetwear and alternative aesthetic that's characterised by pink outfits, corsets, and over the top doll-like details. Jon's key elements of her style often centres around pink colour palettes and enjoys clothing with ruffles, lace, bows and hoods with ears.

Although Jon incorporates many alternative and Gothic inspired elements into her style, she is known to dislike cross motifs in her clothing. She's expressed that although she loves the Gothic aesthetic, she is not a fan of wearing crosses as Jon doesn't identify with religious symbolism.

== Personal life ==
Jon's most prominent and consistent public relationship is with her best friend Vincent. They have been childhood friends for over fifteen years and are longtime roommates. They relocated to Berlin, Germany since February 2020 to be in a city where Jon felt more comfortable and had a larger circle of friends.

Jon has two cats named Chilli and Taco.

Jon tends to keep her romantic life private compared to her professional online work. While she has mentioned having a boyfriend in the past, she does not currently feature a partner as a part of her social media presence.

Jon often refers to herself as Mother Broccoli and her fanbase as Broccolis.

She is a huge fan of Hello Kitty and has incorporated the character into her artistic persona. Jon's stated her love for the character, and released a single from her sophomore album, Strawberry (2026), titled "Hello Kitty".

== Discography ==
=== Studio albums ===
Title	Release date	GER
Villain Of Your Dreams	16 August 2024	7
Strawberry	20 March 2026	12

=== Selected singles ===
- 2021: NAOMI
- 2021: Bite Me
- 2022: On Our Own
- 2022: Taboo
- 2023: St. Valentine
- 2023: Ordinary
- 2024: MANTRA
- 2024: Placebo
- 2024: Ugly
- 2025: ASMR
- 2025: Hello Kitty
- 2025: crows
- 2025: PARAGON
- 2026: Sweet
- 2026: Strawberry
- 2026: Delilah

== Tours ==
- Villain Of Your Dreams Tour (2024–2025)
- Strawberry Tour (2026)
