= Metal couture =

Fashion accessory

Metal couture is a type of adornment or fashion item, made of metal, generally made as art, for fashion photography or high-end couture catwalk. The pieces are generally larger and more significant than jewellery, and are generally worn (either as headpieces or more like clothing), rather than decorating the body like jewellery. In differentiating metal couture from jewellery, as one-off pieces, and generally not practical or useful for the wearer, they are more akin to art, than a standard item of jewellery. They may cover the torso, the neck, the head, or any part of the body. While they can be defined as "a form of jewellery", they can also simply be defined as "fashion designs made from metal". Metal couture can stretch the concept of what is basically metal art, to the point that the metal becomes clothing, somewhat but not exactly the same as wearable art.

Designers who create metal couture may be called "metal couturiers" or "metal couture designers". The designers generally come from a background in jewellery, or in some cases, may have skills in some other form of sheet metal work, for example the skills used to decorate and create historical metal armour.

Because of the size of the pieces, they are generally not made of precious metal as jewellery would be, as this would make them prohibitively expensive. Various types of metal are used for making metal couture, including steel, stainless steel, copper, aluminium, but may include other materials. Metal couture was first featured in fashion shows in the early 2000s, in both mainstream, high-end couture and alternative fashion/subcultural fashion shows.

Some metal couture has featured in product promotional photography, stage shows, art installations and the catwalk. Other items have featured in film, stage, and the video clips of performers including Beyoncé and Lady Gaga.

An early metal couturier was Paco Rabanne, who used metal in clothing for his designs, for film and major fashion labels in the 1960s. Other metal couture designers include Spain's Manual Albarann, who has had his work featured in cinema (Maleficent), on stage and in music videos. The jeweller William Griffiths has featured metal couture, including metal underwear and metal corsetry, in fashion shows in London and Melbourne. Laurel De Witt's label Laureluxe has featured her work in a number of fashion shows in New York. Melbourne-based Bernard Lyons, under the label Assassinus, has had metal couture designs featured regularly in alternative fashion shows in Australia since 2005. Jared Holland's Exosthetik studio in Auckland, New Zealand, specialising in complex electrolytic etching, has featured his work in fashion shows and made pieces for the music industry.
