= Veronica Webb =

American model and actress (b. 1965)

- Born: Detroit, Michigan, U.S.
- Occupations: Model; actress; writer
- Spouses: George Robb (m. 2002; div. 2009) Chris Del Gatto (m. 2013)
- Children: 2
- Modeling information
- Height: 1.78 m (5 ft 10 in)
- Hair color: Dark brown
- Eye color: Brown
- Agency: Muse Management (New York); d'management group (Milan)

Veronica Webb is an American model, writer, and television personality. Born in Detroit, she rose to prominence in the late 1980s and 1990s. She has appeared on the covers of Vogue, Essence, and Elle, and walked runways for designers including Gianni Versace, Azzedine Alaïa, Isaac Mizrahi, and Karl Lagerfeld at Chanel. In 1992, Webb became the first Black model to sign an exclusive cosmetics contract, with Revlon. She has contributed essays to The New York Times, Elle, and Interview.

== Career ==
Webb appeared on the covers of major magazines and walked for designers including Alaïa, Isaac Mizrahi, Karl Lagerfeld, and Todd Oldham. In 1992, she signed an exclusive cosmetics contract with Revlon, the first Black model to do so with a major cosmetics company. In 1995, she modeled for the first annual Victoria's Secret Fashion Show.

She appeared in the music video for New Order's "Round and Round" from their 1989 album Technique.

In 1991, Webb made her feature film debut in Spike Lee's Jungle Fever. She has had television roles on Becker and Just Shoot Me!, and was the co-host of the first season of Bravo's Tim Gunn's Guide to Style.

Webb has written essays and columns for Interview, Paper Magazine, Details, Elle, The Sunday Times, The New York Times Syndicate, Condé Nast's Cookie magazine, and Esquire.

== Personal life ==
Webb married George Robb in 2002. They have two daughters. The couple divorced in 2009. She later married Chris Del Gatto.

== Filmography ==
=== Film ===
Year	Title	Role
1991	Jungle Fever	Vera
1992	Malcolm X	Sister Lucille Rosary
1993	For Love or Money	Model
1998	54	VIP Patron
1998	Holy Man	Diandre
1999	In Too Deep	Pam
1999	The Big Tease	Herself
2001	Zoolander	Herself
2001	Someone Like You	Herself
2006	Dirty Laundry	Susan

=== Television ===
Year	Title	Role	Episodes
1996	The Sunday Show		Episode 3.1
1996–1997	Clueless	Supermodel	2 episodes
1997	Just Shoot Me!	Herself	"The Devil and Maya Gallo"
1998	Damon	Tracy Warren	2 episodes
2000	The West Wing	Herself	"20 Hours in L.A."
2001	Becker	Heidi	"The Princess Cruise"
2001	It's Like, You Know...	Herself	"Hoop Dreams"

=== Music videos ===
Year	Artist	Title	1985	Scritti Politti	"Perfect Way"
1989	New Order	"Round & Round"			
1989	Queen Latifah	"Dance for Me"			
1989	Shirlee	"Unity 2"			
1995	Jodeci	"Freek'n You"			

== See also ==
- List of black fashion models
