= Nakki =

Nakki may refer to:

- Näkki, a water spirit in Finnic mythologies
- Nakki (crater), a crater on Callisto
- Nakki Lake, a lake in India

== See also ==
- Naki (disambiguation)
