= Down with This =

"Down With This"

Single by Charisse Arrington

from the album The House That I Built
- Released: 1996
- Genre: R&B
- Label: MCA Records
- Songwriter(s): Charisse Arrington, Foster Bradley, Luther T Cheek

Charisse Arrington singles chronology
"Down With This" (1996)	"Ain't No Love" (1997)

"Down With This" is the title of a top-five dance single by Charisse Arrington. It was the first single released from her debut album The House That I Built.

== Chart positions ==
Chart (1996)	Peak position
U.S. Billboard Hot R&B/Hip-Hop Songs	77
U.S. Billboard Hot Dance Breakout	5
U.S. Billboard Hot Dance/Club Play	17

== Track listings ==
US promo single

No.	Title	Length
1.	"Down With This" (Radio Edit)
2.	"Down With This" (Keep Jammin' Lovely Hits Mix)
3.	"Down With This" (Harlem World Mix)
4.	"Down With This" (Vibe Mix)
5.	"Down With This" (Young Wu Mix)
6.	"Down With This" (Instrumental)
