= Charisse Arrington =

American singer

Charisse Arrington is an R&B singer who was signed to MCA Records in the 1990s. Her biggest success was with the single "Down With This" which peaked in the top twenty of the Billboard Dance singles chart and top five of the Billboard Dance breakout chart. Her last charting single "Ain't No Way" was released in 1997, it peaked at number ninety-two on the Billboard R&B singles chart.

== Discography ==
Albums

The House That I Built (1996) (Unreleased) (MCA Records)

Singles

Year	Single	Peak positions			
Year	Single	Hot R&B/Hip-Hop Singles & Tracks	Hot Dance Club Play	Hot Dance Breakouts	
1996	"Down With This"	77	17	5	
1997	"Ain't No Love"	92	-	-	"—" denotes a release that did not chart.
