= Ain't No Love (Charisse Arrington song) =

"Ain't No Way"

Single by Charisse Arrington

from the album The House That I Built
- Released: 1997
- Genre: R&B
- Label: MCA Records
- Songwriter(s): Carolyn Franklin

Charisse Arrington singles chronology
"Down With This" (1996)	"Ain't No Way" (1997)

"Ain't No Way" is the title of a dance/R&B single by Charisse Arrington. It was the final single released from her debut album The House That I Built. The single charted on the Billboard R&B/Hip Hop Singles chart on April 5, 1997.

== Chart positions ==
Chart (1997)	Peak position
U.S. Billboard Hot R&B/Hip-Hop Songs	92
