= Marie Dean Arrington =

American murderer

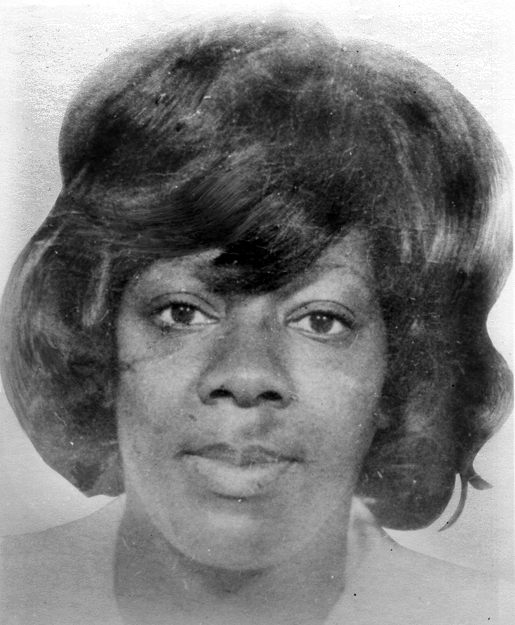

FBI Ten Most Wanted Fugitive
- Charges: Prison escape (originally convicted of murder)

Description
- Born: August 8, 1933; Leesburg, Florida
- Died: May 10, 2014 (aged 80); Lowell Correctional Institution, Marion County, Florida
- Height: 5 ft 2 in (157 cm)
- Weight: 119 to 126 lb

Status
- Convictions: Manslaughter (1964); First degree murder (1968)
- Penalty: 20 years imprisonment (1964); Death; commuted to life imprisonment (1968)
- Added: May 29, 1969
- Caught: December 22, 1971
- Number: 301
- Captured

Marie Dean Arrington (August 8, 1933 – May 10, 2014) was an American criminal. In 1969, she became the second woman to be placed on the list of FBI Ten Most Wanted Fugitives.

Arrington was originally sentenced to death for the murder of Vivian Ritter, a legal secretary who worked in Leesburg, Florida. Ritter worked for public defender Bob Pierce, who had unsuccessfully represented Arrington's two children in felony charges. Arrington escaped from prison in 1969 while awaiting execution by cutting through a window screen and fleeing in her pajamas.

After she was caught, she was sentenced in 1972 to 10 additional years for escape, but her death sentence was commuted to life in prison when the U.S. Supreme Court struck down capital punishment as unconstitutional in Furman v. Georgia (1972).

Arrington died on May 10, 2014, in Lowell Correctional Institution in Marion County, Florida, the same institution from which she escaped. She was 80 years old.

== Murder of Jack Arrington ==
Arrington's first conviction occurred in 1964, for the killing of her husband Lester "Jack" Arrington. Jack, 34, was a former policeman and a bouncer at a nightclub in Miami. Jack was killed on July 4, 1964, on Bethune Beach. Arrington turned herself in the following day, confessing to shooting her husband. During the trial, Arrington claimed that the shooting was an accident while her lawyer claimed self-defense, as Jack had become violent with her while the two were arguing in their car. This resulted in her shooting him. Nathaniel Powers, a witness at the scene, told police that he broke the couple up after he saw Jack choking her in the front seat of the car. As the police were unable to locate the weapon Arrington was found guilty of manslaughter instead of more severe charges and sentenced to twenty years in prison. Arrington would later admit in a 2012 interview that she had buried the gun with her husband.

== Murder of Vivian Ritter ==
Arrington had two children, a son and daughter. In 1967 her son, Lloyd Dean, robbed a gas station with a friend in Leesburg, Florida. No one was hurt and $60 was stolen. Her son was represented by public attorney Bob Pierce, who advised him to plead guilty. Dean was sentenced to life in prison in 1968 at the age of 18, while his friend only received probation. Pierce had also represented Arrington's daughter on unrelated fraud charges, which resulted in the daughter receiving jail time as well.

This enraged Arrington, who felt that Pierce did not fairly represent Dean. On April 22, 1968, while out on an appeal bond for her manslaughter conviction, Arrington went to Pierce’s office in Leesburg with the intention of killing him. Once there she discovered that Pierce was not at his office. Arrington then abducted his secretary, Vivian Ritter, which raised tensions within the town. Searches were conducted for Ritter and a psychic was consulted to help find the secretary. Her car was discovered two days after her disappearance, bloodstained. The body of Ritter, who had three children, was found three days later in the woods near State road 44, several miles away from Leesburg. She had been shot and run over with her own car repeatedly.

Prior to her capture Arrington burgled the home of Judge Troy Hall, who had given her son his life sentence. When she was captured, investigators discovered several notes in her room and in her clothing. The notes threatened to kill the wife of Hall and to dismember Ritter if law officers did not back off and release her children from jail.

=== Trial and conviction ===
During the trial, multiple witnesses testified against Arrington, linking her to the crime. A taxi driver reported dropping off Arrington half a block away from Pierce's office on the morning of April 22. Arrington's landlady stated that she had lent her a .22 caliber which was never returned to her and was later found to be the gun used to kill Ritter. On December 6, 1968, Arrington was sentenced to death for first degree murder.

== Escape and later life ==
On March 1, 1969, Arrington escaped from Florida Correctional Institution in her pajamas by cutting a window screen and jumping out. In May 1969, she was placed on the FBI’s 10 Most Wanted List, making her the second woman to ever be placed on the list. Arrington wasn't captured until three years later in March 1972. She fled to New Orleans and worked as a waitress. Arrington later described the feeling of being wanted as sounding like "the old wild wild West and the Jesse James Gang" and noted that reading newspapers about her being wanted dead or alive and the reward was entertaining.

For her escape Arrington was given an additional 10 years. Her death sentence was commuted to life in prison during August 1972, when the US Supreme Court declared capital punishment as unconstitutional. Marie Dean Arrington died from heart problems at age 80 on May 10, 2014.
