= Naqi =

Naqi may refer to:

== People ==
- Ali Naqi (disambiguation), an Arabic masculine given name
- Syed Ali Naqi Naqvi Qumi, ayatollah of Pakistan
- Mohammad Ali Naqi, Bangladeshi architect
- Muhammad Mehdi ibn Ali Naqi, Persian physician from Isfahan
- Naqi Ali Khan (1830–1880)
- Näqi İsänbät (1899–1992), Tatar writer

== Places ==
- Naqi al-Fardah, village in western central Yemen
