= John Arrington =

American physicist

John Arrington is a nuclear physicist and group leader of Medium-Energy Physics, Physics Division, at the Argonne National Laboratory. He is known for his leading role in a number of important nuclear physics and medium-energy/high-energy experiments at the Argonne and Jefferson National Laboratory Accelerator Thomas Jefferson National Accelerator Facility facilities. He is perhaps one of the most active and most cited young nuclear physicists in the world, with more than 8000 citations to his work and an H-index of 51.

He has been awarded a fellowship of the American Physical Society and was a recipient of U.S. Presidential Early Career Award for Science and Engineering (awarded in 2005) and APS/DNP Dissertation award in Nuclear Physics (awarded in 2000).

Arrington did his B.S. in applied mathematics, engineering, and physics (with distinction) from University of Wisconsin–Madison followed by a PhD in physics from California Institute of Technology, with advisor Brad Fillipone. His thesis title was Inclusive electron scattering from nuclei at x>1 and high Q^2.
