= Alternative fashion =

Fashion that does not conform to mainstream styles

Alternative fashion or alt fashion is fashion that stands apart from mainstream, commercial fashion. It includes both styles which do not conform to the mainstream fashion of their time and the styles of specific subcultures (such as emo, goth, hip hop and punk). Some alternative fashion styles are attention-grabbing and more artistic than practical (goth, ganguro, rivethead), while some develop from anti-fashion sentiments that focus on simplicity and utilitarianism (grunge, rocker, skinhead).

== Characteristics ==
Alternative fashion styles often originate as ways of expressing attitudes towards individuality, consumerism, social constructs on behavior, self-expression, and/or disillusionment with what is viewed as "normal" society. Many styles are influenced by music and the dress style of individual bands or musicians. While the qualities of individuality and open-mindedness are associated with alternative fashion, levels of conformity within subcultures, judgemental behaviors and expressions of feelings of superiority exist within certain alternative fashion communities just as they exist in aspects of mainstream fashion and culture. Pressure to 'fit in,' even just within a small niche community, may influence personal style.

== Historical and sociological perspectives ==
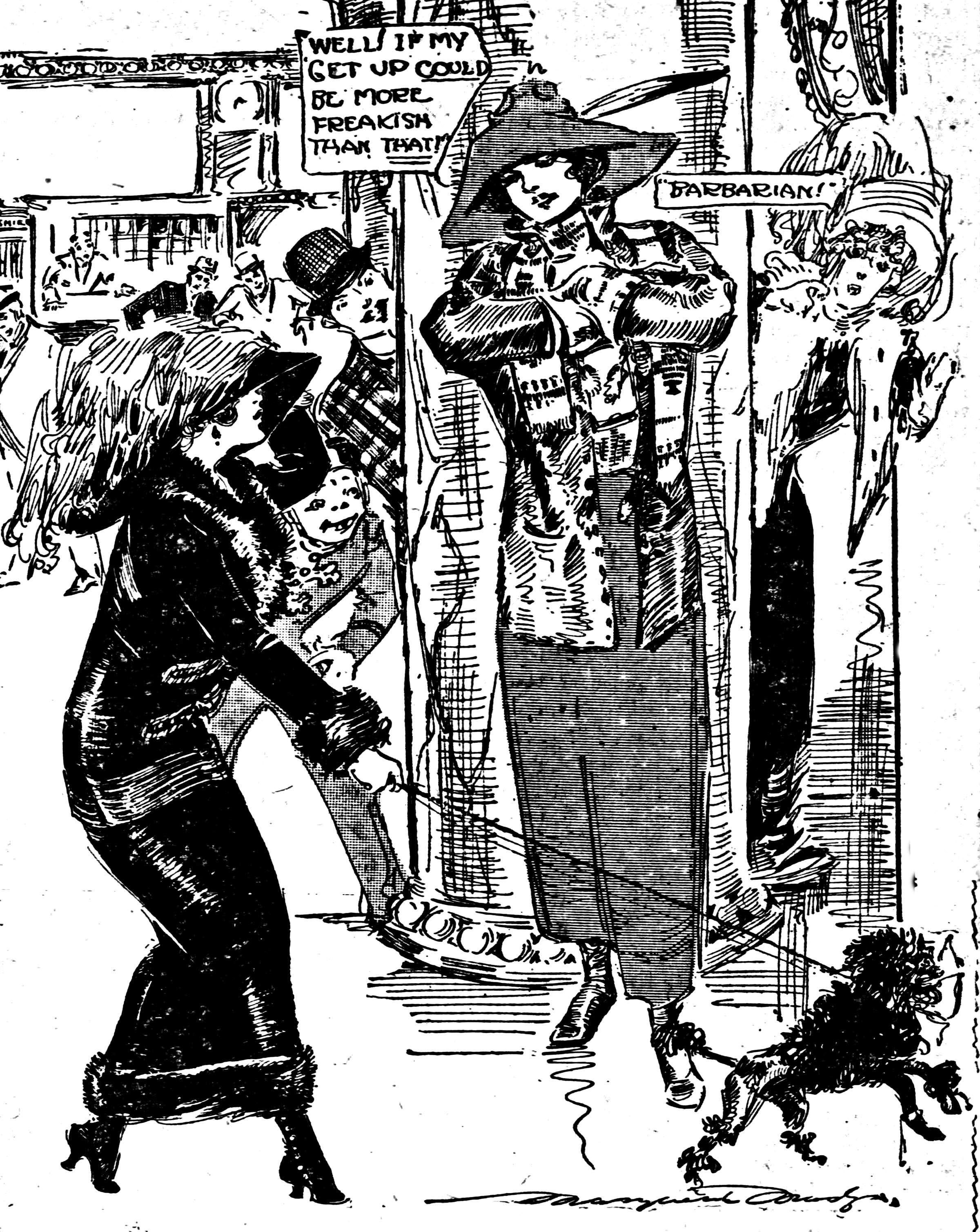
1911 sketch by American journalist Marguerite Martyn contrasts fashion designer Beatrice Farnham's alternative attire with that of a modern woman of that era.

Alternative fashion is often considered a modern concept but it, and the concept of subculture it is often related to, have existed for centuries. As covered in Ken Gelder's exploration of the history of alternative culture patterns in Western society, Subcultures: Cultural Histories and Social Practice, alternative fashions have often been used to identify, and even stereotype, members of groups with value systems that diverged from common culture. Gelder states that alternative fashions have traditionally been related to subcultures that have been identified by mass society as:

- disinterested in common moral order: idle, parasitical, hedonistic, criminal
- disinterested in or against adhering to the structure of the social class
- identification with an area (street, neighborhood, club) rather than self-owned property
- preferring to develop "family" and community outside of traditional paradigms
- attitudes against or wary of mass production, homogeneity, heteronormativity, socially imposed behavior constrictions

Those who utilize alternative fashion may vary greatly in beliefs and not identify with any of these concepts. Often it is the mass social perceptions of the meaning of certain fashions and their relation to a particular niche group that is important in understanding the interaction of alternative fashion with mass culture - a fashion is often more remembered for what it is related to in the popular consciousness than what its wearer's intended it to stand for. Particularly in a sociopolitical sense alternative fashion has often been intentionally adopted by an individual or group to display a break from the beliefs or mores of popular culture and as a form of self-expression that challenged the boundaries of what was considered appropriate, fashionable or practical.

The use of subculture terminology in the 21st century to categorize or interpret dress style is often inaccurate, or at the least does not provide a complete picture of the individual being assessed by their 'look,' due to the constant evolution in the meaning, relevance and cohesion of certain subcultures and even the term 'subculture' itself. Alternative fashion is often looked at through the lens of social politics - it is considered a visual expression of opposition to societal norms, thus heavily associated with the idealism, energy and rebellion of youth culture. However, sociological studies into exploring alternative fashion have found individuals who retained statistically uncommon modes of dress on a permanent post-adolescent basis. Alternative fashion generally lays down a challenge to accepted norms, though the reactions received by wearers of alternative fashion from those who adhere to more conventional stylings can be as diverse as the wearers themselves. It can be a visual language that people employ to communicate with each other indicating common interests or involvement with similar activities, a challenge to modern conceptions of aesthetic beauty and/or a basic form of self-expression, like painting or writing.

== Commodification ==
Traditionally alternative clothing, shoes and accessories have been largely procured from independently owned businesses, such as the boutiques found in artistic districts of large urban centers. As some alternative fashion have become increasingly embraced by the mainstream, these types of small, specialized retailers have become displaced by the Internet, much like mainstream retail outlets. Additionally, as more and more people co-opted these fashion trends, chain stores, which may offer a wider variety of products at a lower price and are easier to access than boutiques in non-urban areas, began to soak up a large part of the alternative fashion market. This change in the availability and commodification of alternative fashions has encouraged much broader use of styles in the mainstream once only found in niche groups. Items from thrift & vintage shops, altered and DIY fashions have also long held a place in alternative fashion to the point where the use of mismatched second-hand clothing is considered cliche to alternative and liberal ideologies.

== Controversies ==
Many forms of alternative fashion gain attention, and even notoriety, through their relationship to individuals or groups that are seen as socially undesirable – those involved in behavior considered criminal, deviant or anti-social – even though these types of behaviors may not be common among those involved in alternative fashion. For instance, greasers of the 1950s were associated with street gangs and random acts of juvenile violence, hippies of the 1960s (along with ravers of the 1980–1990s) with promiscuity, anti-establishment agendas and, especially, drug use and those sporting hip hop style with the selling of drugs and other criminal behavior. There was a wave of anti-gothic policies and commentary in the wake of the Columbine High School massacre. The crime, perpetrated by two young men dressed in black trench coats who were known to be fans of heavy, dark themed music, was immediately associated with the gothic subculture in the media despite the shooters' lack of association to the subculture and music. Policies were passed in schools across the country banning dress styles and items associated with the gothic subculture. Many individuals who dressed in any way related to the gothic style, whether or not they associated with this subculture, were targets of fear, anger and suspicion. The subculture as a whole, though extremely diverse in religious and social beliefs, was pigeonholed by the media as a dangerous influence on children.

== Influence ==
Mainstream culture, particularly retailers and the mass media, have often looked to alternative fashion for up and coming trends and, increasingly, as an easy way to market products to a niche group that may not be having its tastes supplied elsewhere. Some in subcultures view this as flattering and as a positive expansion of what is socially acceptable, and easily available, fashion. Others consider the involvement of mainstream institutions in alternative fashion as a desecration of what the concept stands for and feel the mass marketing of previously underground styles, particularly to impressionable youth markets who are more concerned with a look than the meaning behind it, amounts to a non-violent form of cultural genocide. When a previously non-mainstream style becomes popular the core group of a certain alternative niche may be watered down with dozens or even hundreds of individuals who are not genuinely invested in the advancement of alternative culture or its precepts of individuality and present an image of the subculture not at all related to its traditional members' behaviors. For instance, rave culture was heavily associated with ideas of racial, gender and sexual orientation equality and encouraged unity, creativity and individuality amongst its members. The commodification of rave fashions in chain outlets and internet boutiques coincided with a media frenzy focusing on drug use in the rave community. These factors led to an insurgence of young people interested in emulating rave style, and obtaining the substances associated with it, rather than in promoting the utopian precepts originally associated with raves.

Alternative fashion is expressed, discussed, viewed and proliferated through many of the same channels as mainstream fashion, such as fashion shows, websites, blogs and magazines, however in non-mainstream forms of these spaces, fueled by personal creativity. It is common for projects related to alternative fashion to be independently run by individuals or small groups and to be offered to the public cheaply or free of charge. However, just as alternative fashion has been commodified by chain stores, some level of commercialization may exist within outlets of alternative fashion seeking to exploit certain styles as "the next big thing" or taking financial advantage of customers with limited options.

== Alternative fashion examples ==
- Aristocrat – Japanese street fashion
- Artistic Dress – Medieval-inspired dress reform movement
- Beatnik – Media stereotype based on characteristics of the Beat Generation
- Cottagecore – Aesthetic of nostalgia popular among youths
- Cyber fashion – Fashion subculture of goth and cyberpunk
- E-kid – Youth subculture
- Emo – Youth subculture
- Fetish fashion – Extreme or provocative clothing
- Flapper – 1920s women's subculture
- Goblincore – Subculture and aesthetic centered around goblins
- Goth fashion – Fashion of goth subculture
- Greaser – 1950s and 60s youth subculture in the United States
- Grunge fashion – Fashion trend peaking in the mid-1990s
- Gyaru – Japanese fashion subculture
- Heavy metal fashion – Performer and fan worn attire as representing heavy metal music
- Hip hop – Various styles of dress that originated in the United States
- Hippie – 1960s subculture
- Hipster – Subculture defined by claims to authenticity and uniqueness
- Jirai Kei – Japanese subculture and aesthetic
- Kinderwhore – American 1990s clothing style
- Lolita fashion – Japanese fashion style
- Mod – Subculture in England
- Mall goth – Goth subculture
- Neo-Victorian – Aesthetic movement
- New Romantic – 1970s popular culture movement originating in the UK
- Biker – Motorcycle subculture
- Pin-up – Model whose mass-produced pictures see wide appeal as popular culture
- Punk fashion – Fashion of punk subculture
- Raver – Dance party
- Rivethead – Subculture of industrial dance music
- Rockabilly – Early style of rock and roll music
- Rocker – Biker subculture members in the United Kingdom
- Rude boy – Jamaican street subculture since 1960s
- Scene – Youth subculture
- Seapunk – Internet subculture
- Skater fashion – Action sport on skateboards
- Skinhead – Working-class youth subculture
- Soft grunge – Fashion trend
- Steampunk – Subgenre of the steampunk movement
- Surfer – Culture associated with the sport of surfing

== Gallery ==
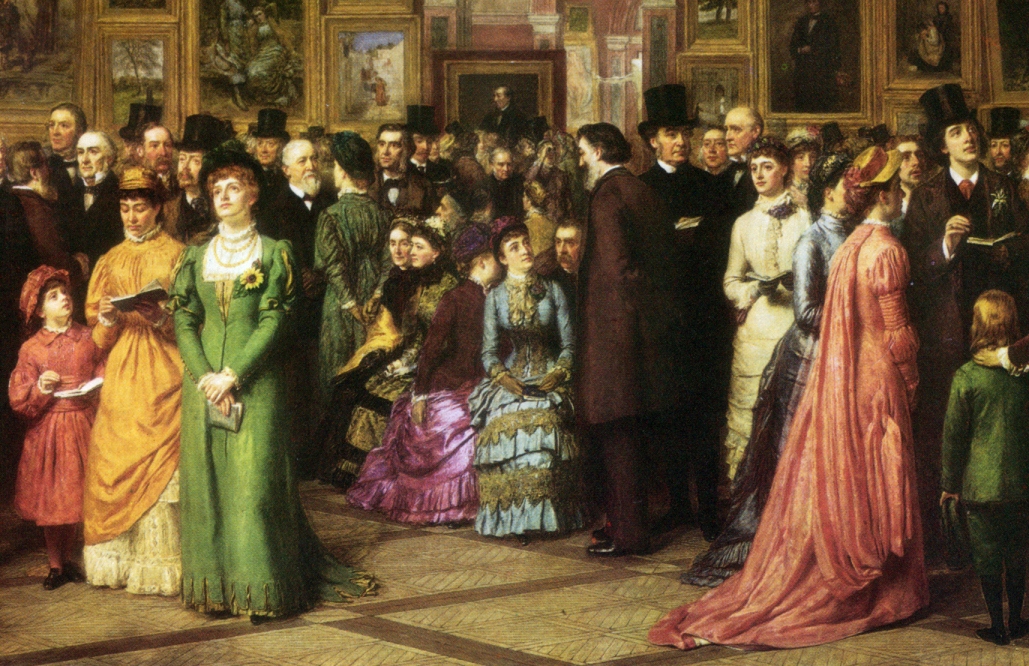
William Powell Frith's 1883 painting A Private View at the Royal Academy, 1881, portraying the contrasts between women's Artistic Dress (foreground) with the time's fashionable attire (background)

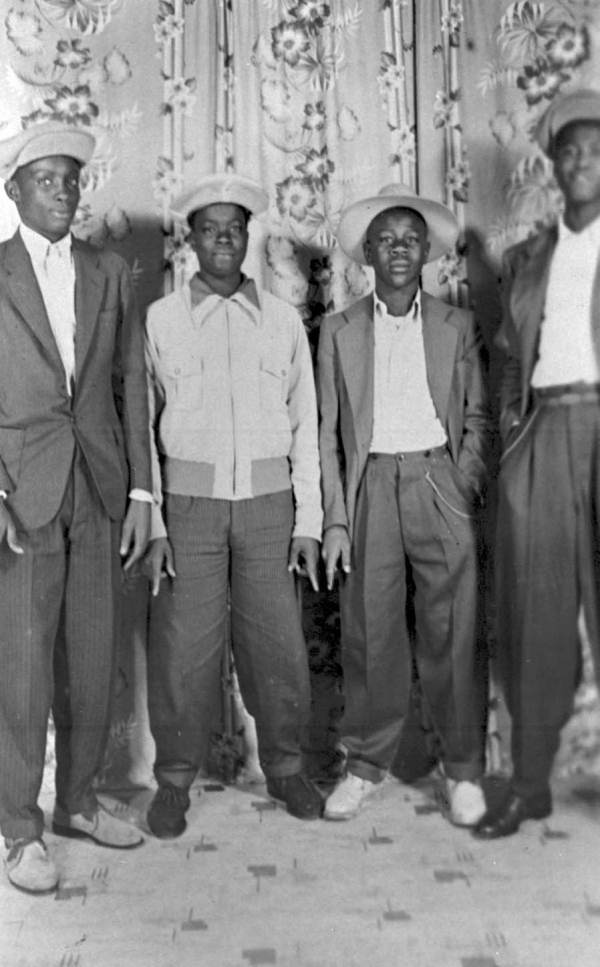
Four hepcats in zoot suits (1940s)

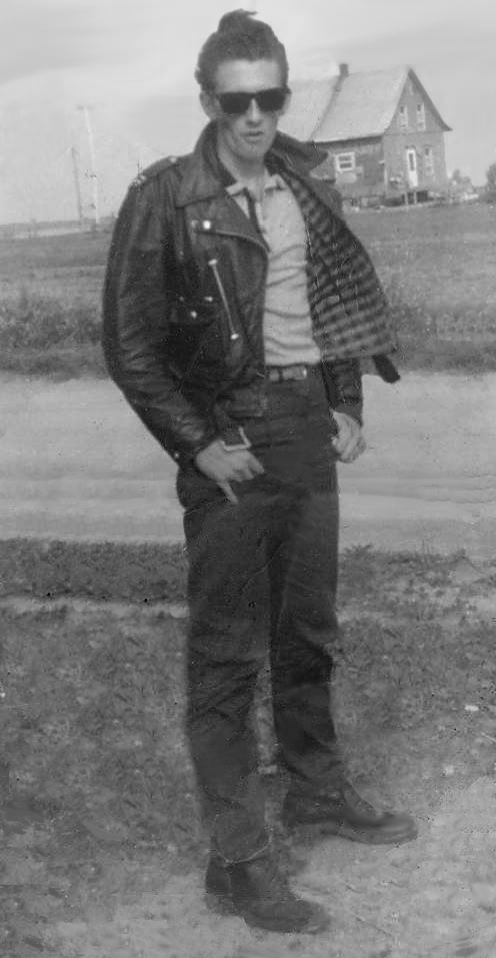
A greaser (c. 1960)

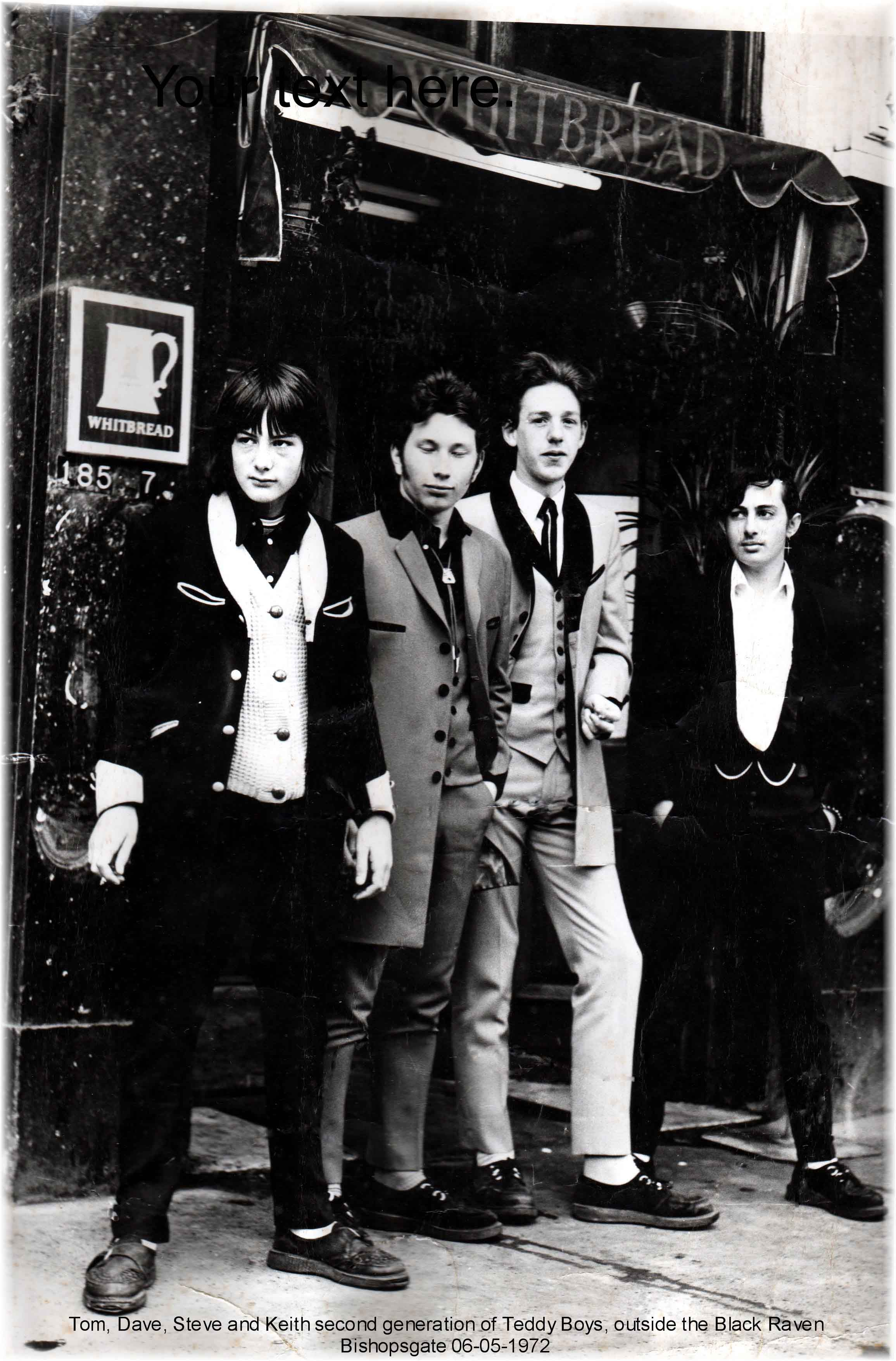
Four Teddy Boys (1972)

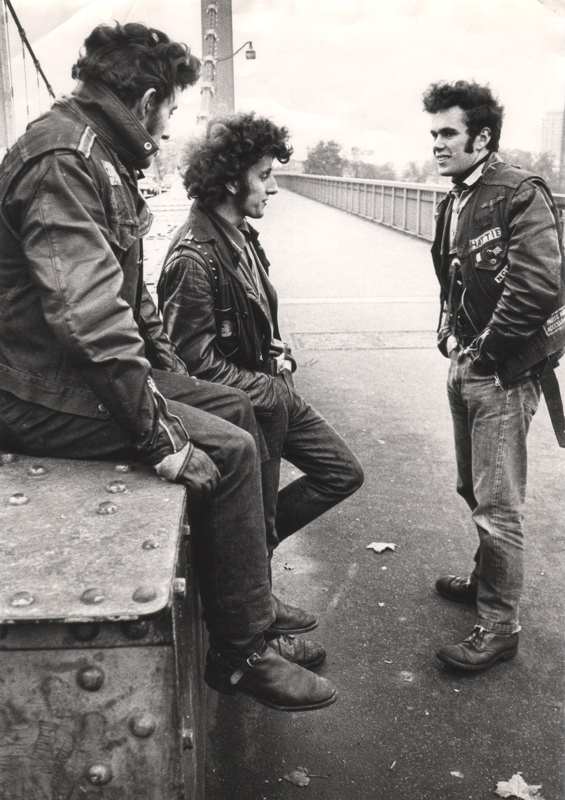
Three rockers (late 1970s)

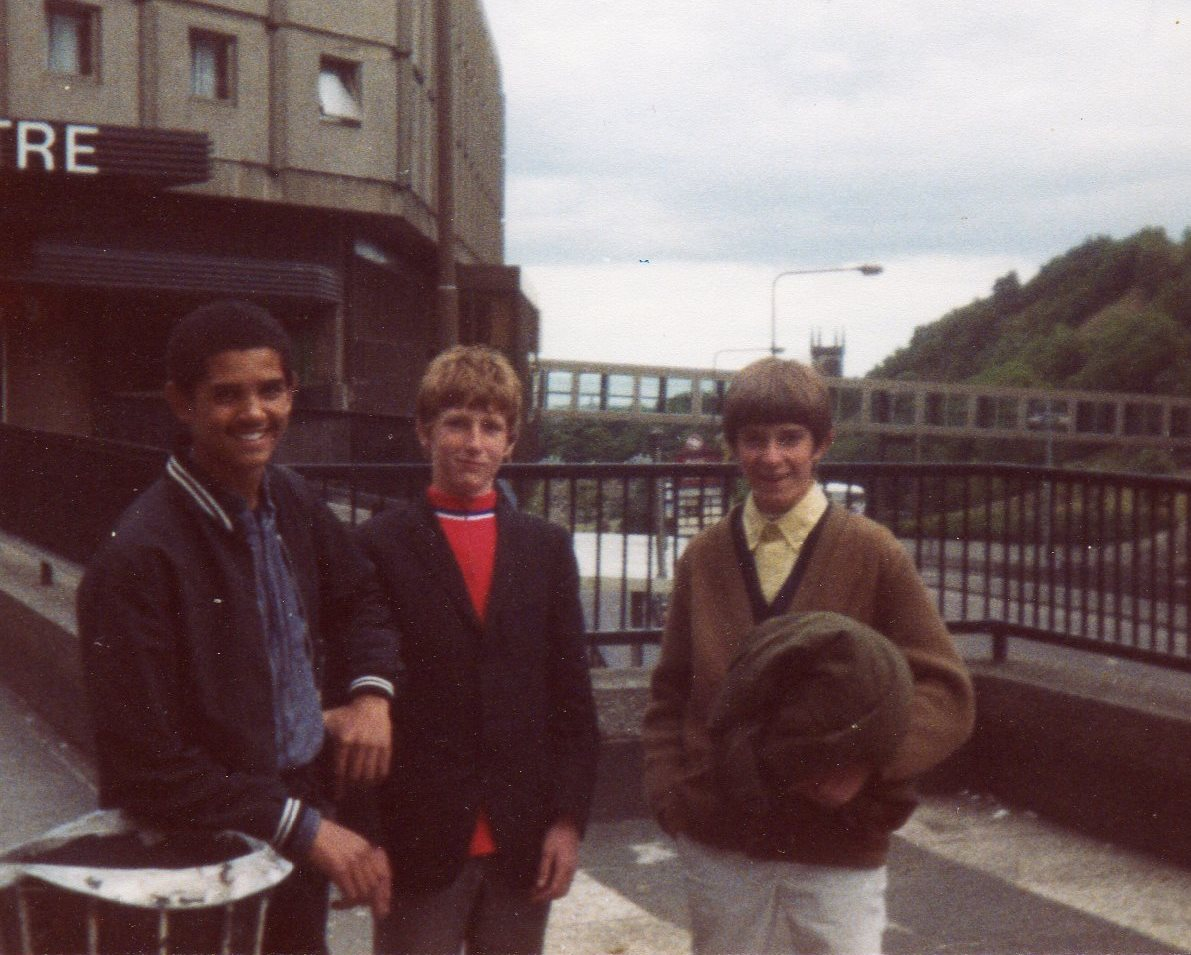
Three mods (1984)

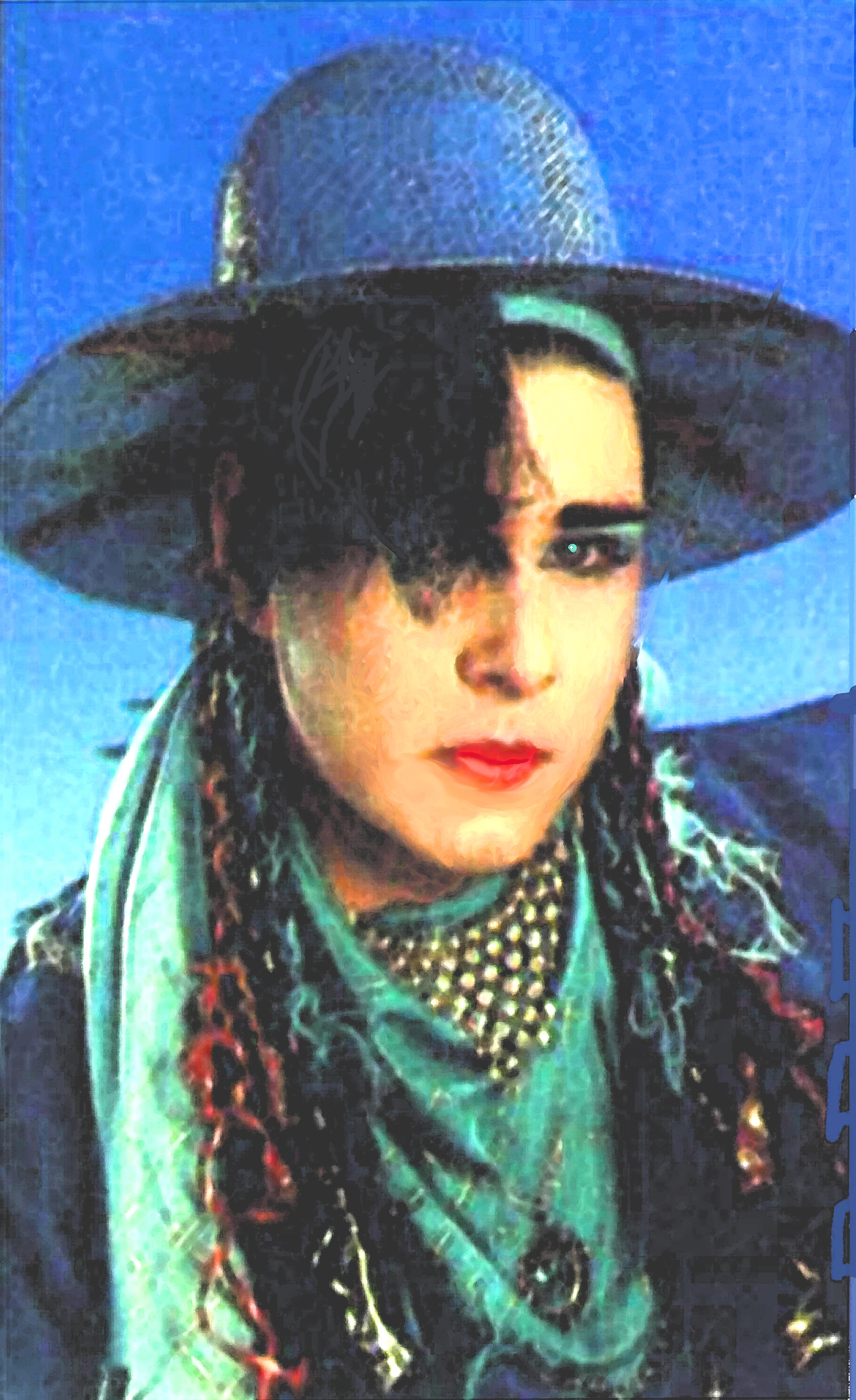
A man in New Romantic fashion (1989)

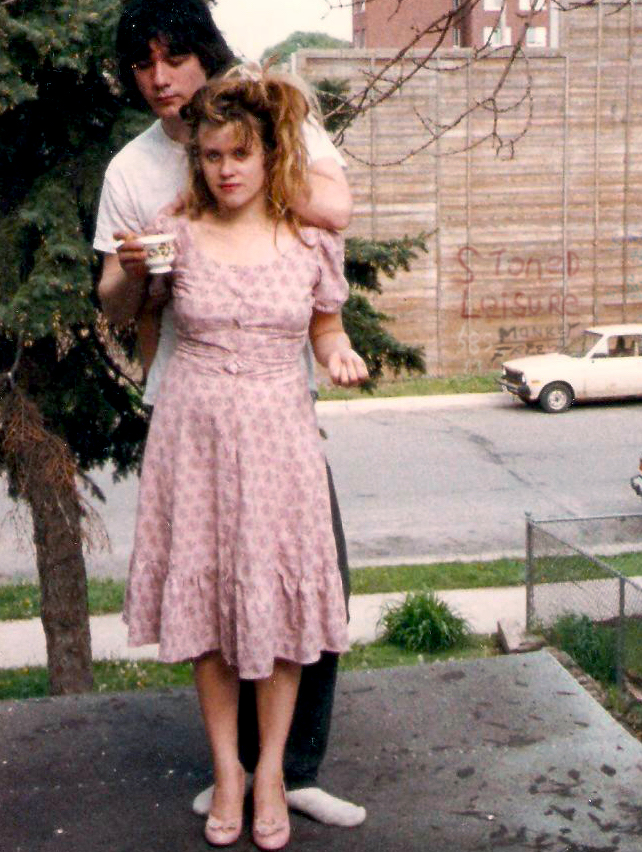
Kat Bjelland in kinderwhore clothing (1992)

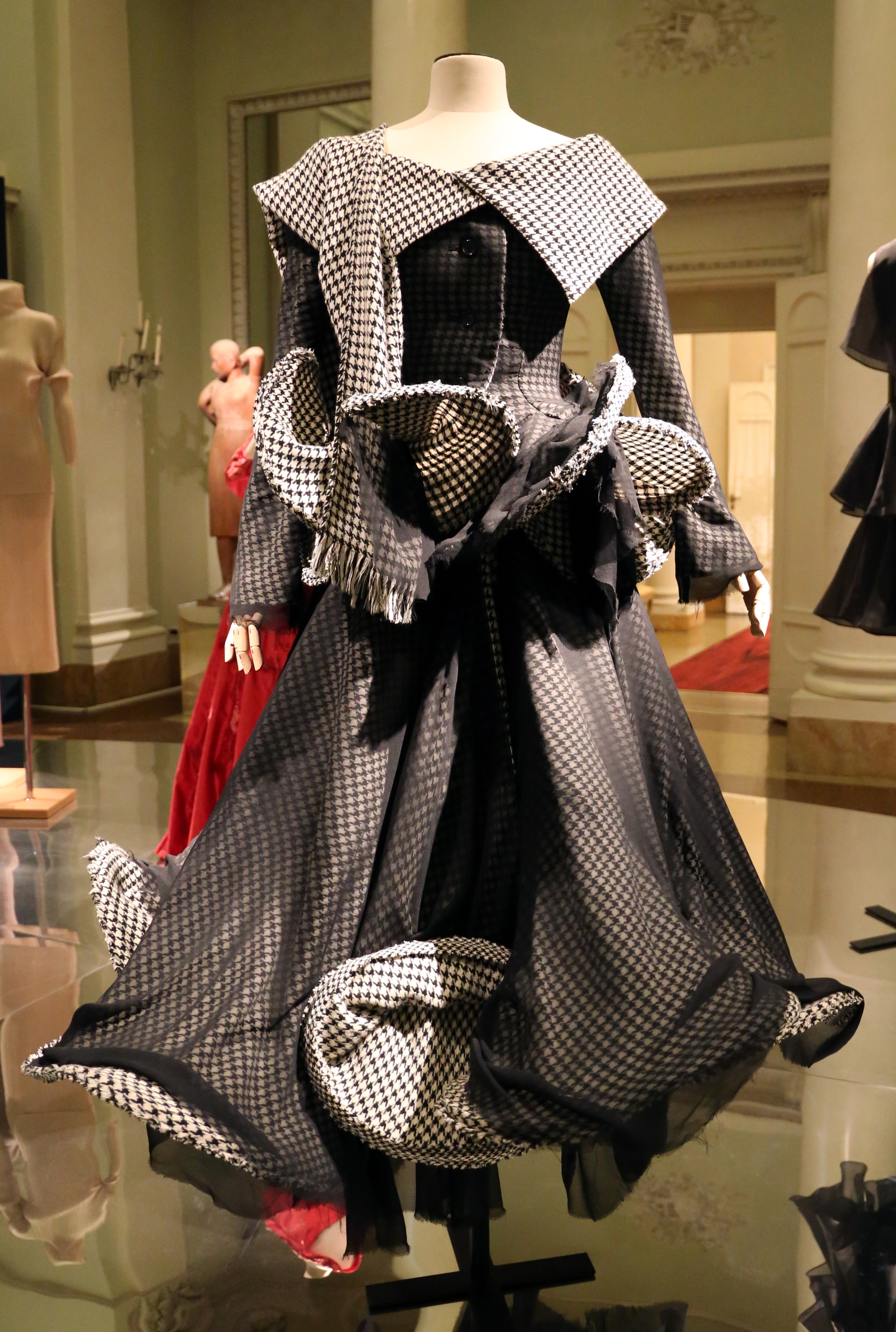
A dress from Yohji Yamamoto's fall–winter 2003–2004 collection

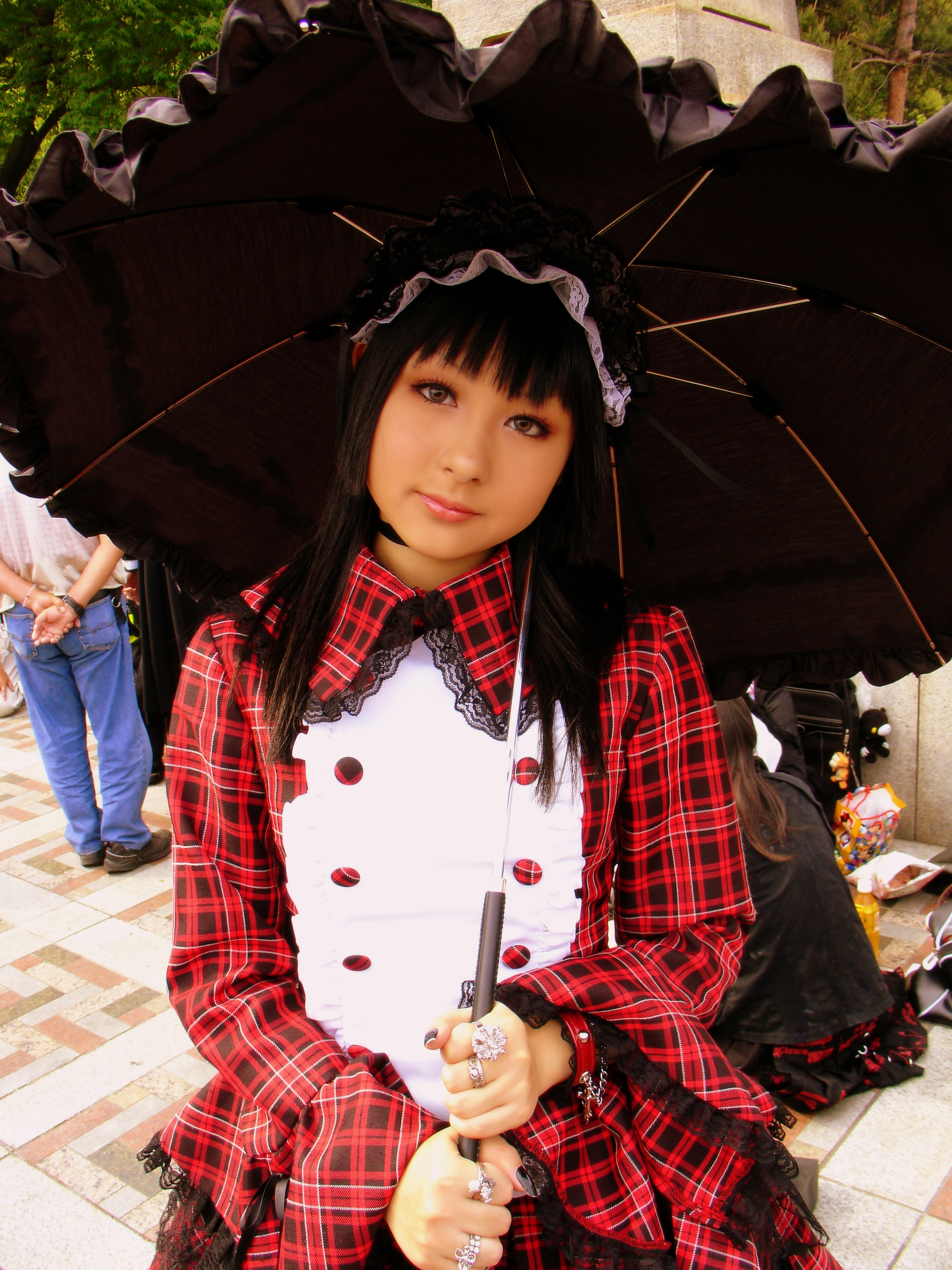
A woman in Lolita fashion (2005)

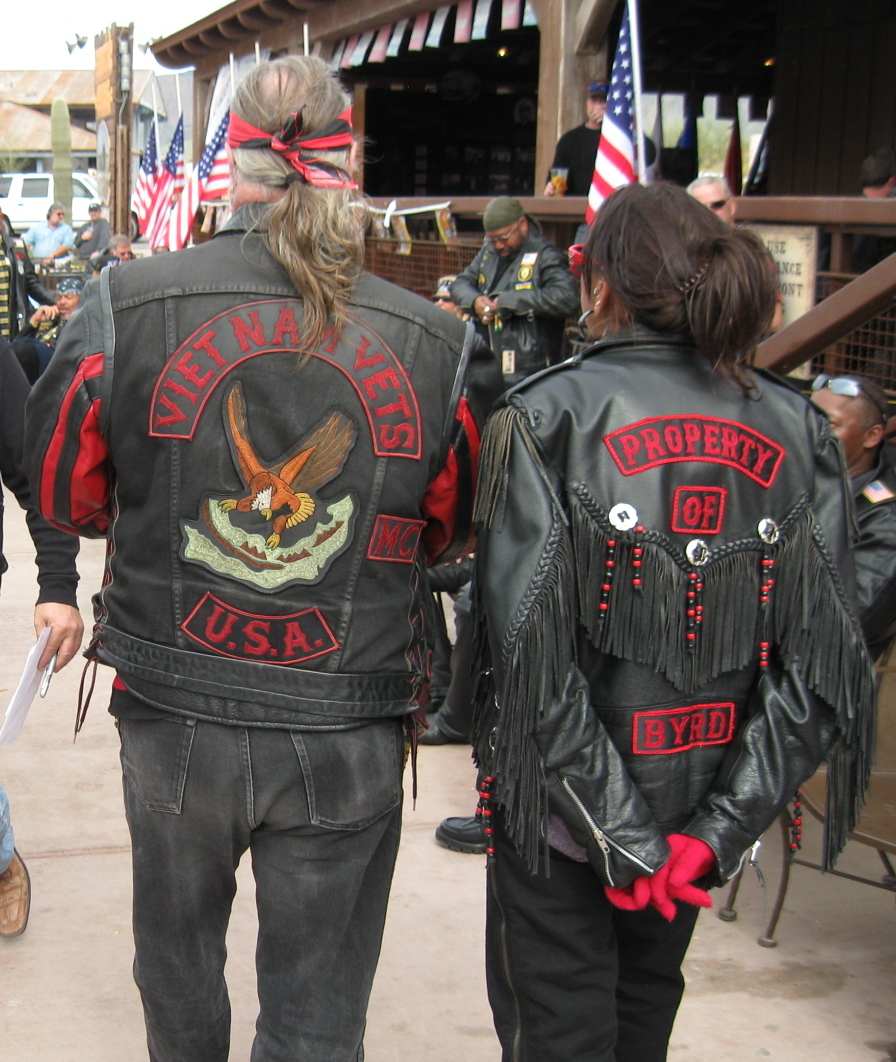
Two bikers, wearing colors on their cut-off (left) and tasseled leather jacket (right) in 2006

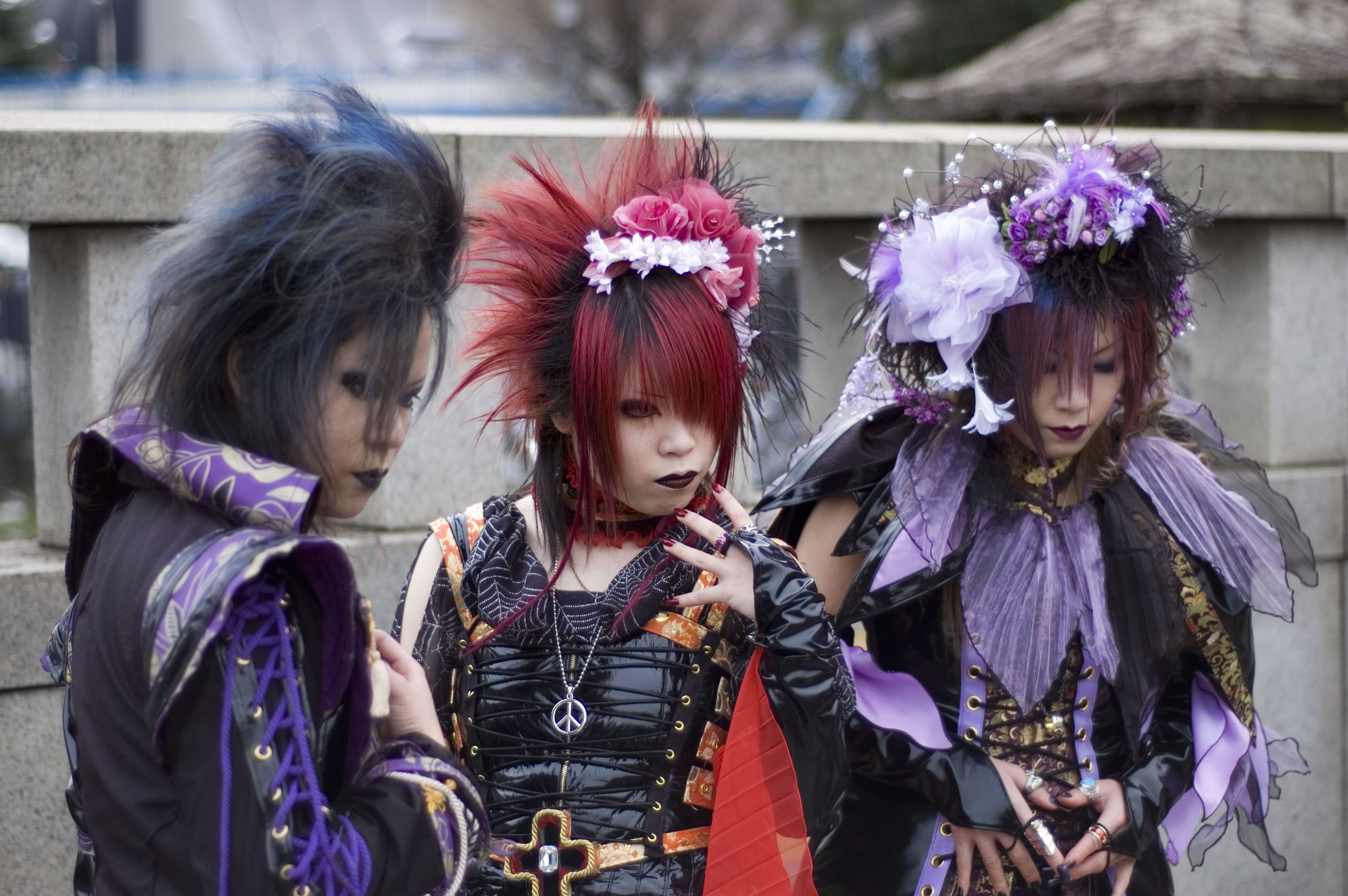
Three people in visual kei (2006)

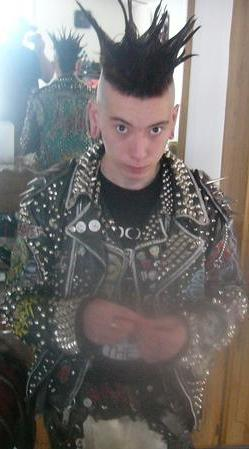
A punk in punk fashion (c. 2007)

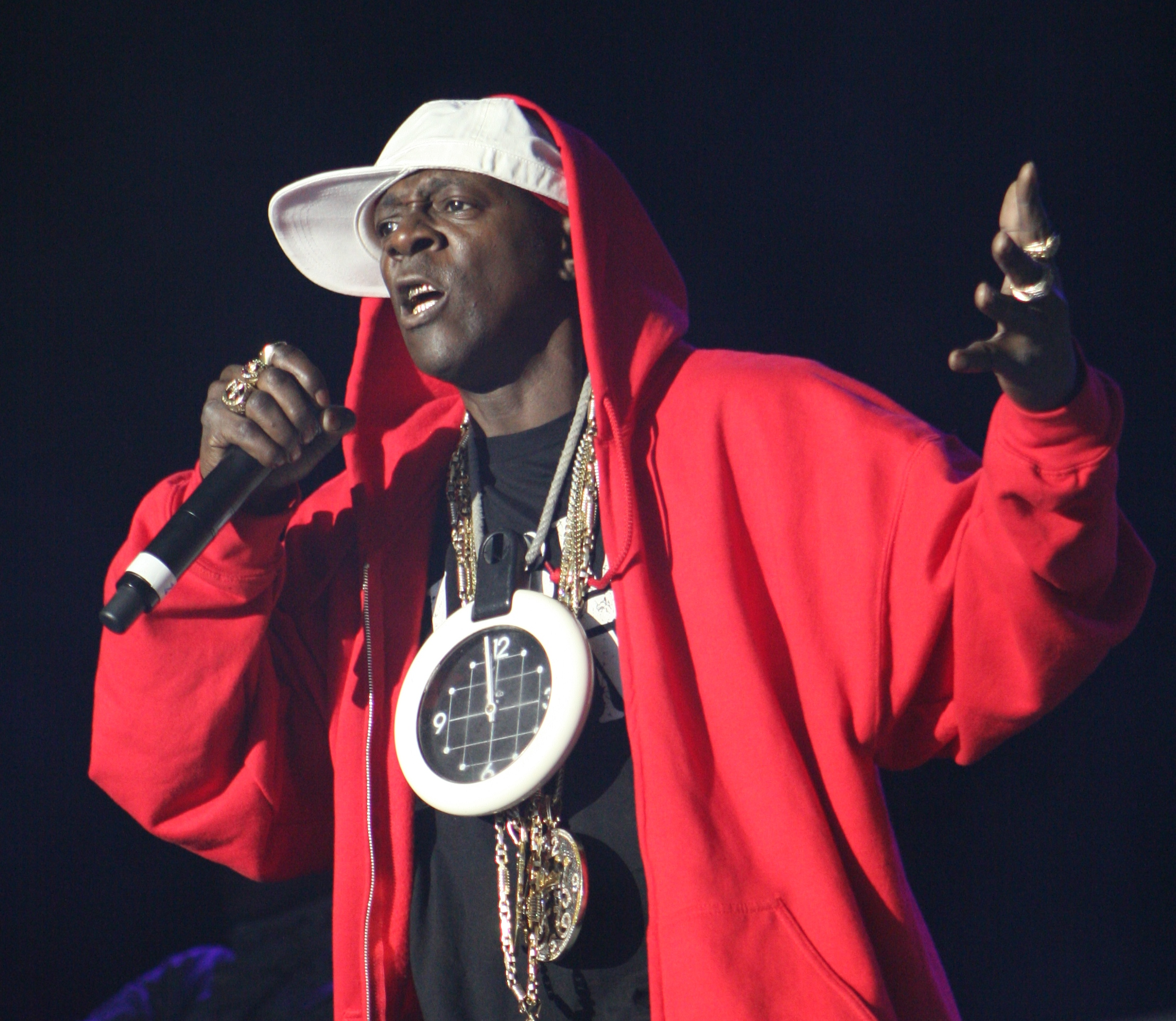
Flavor Flav in 1980s hip hop fashion (2008)

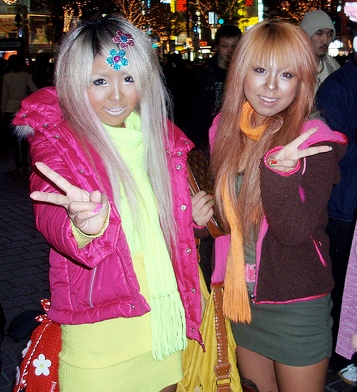
Two women in ganguro (2008)

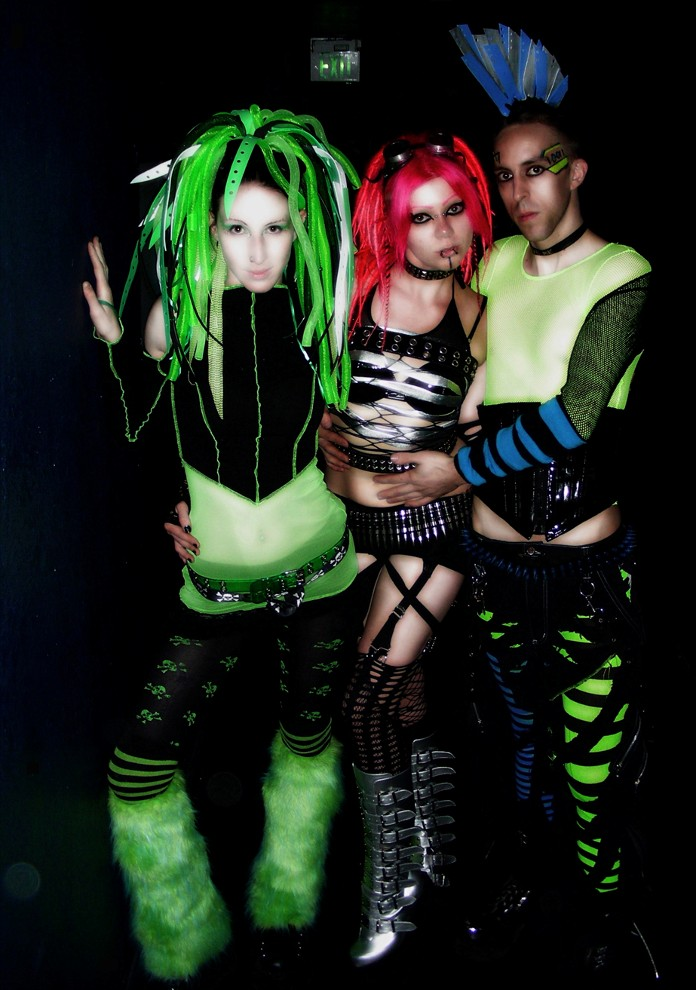
Three cybergoths (2009)

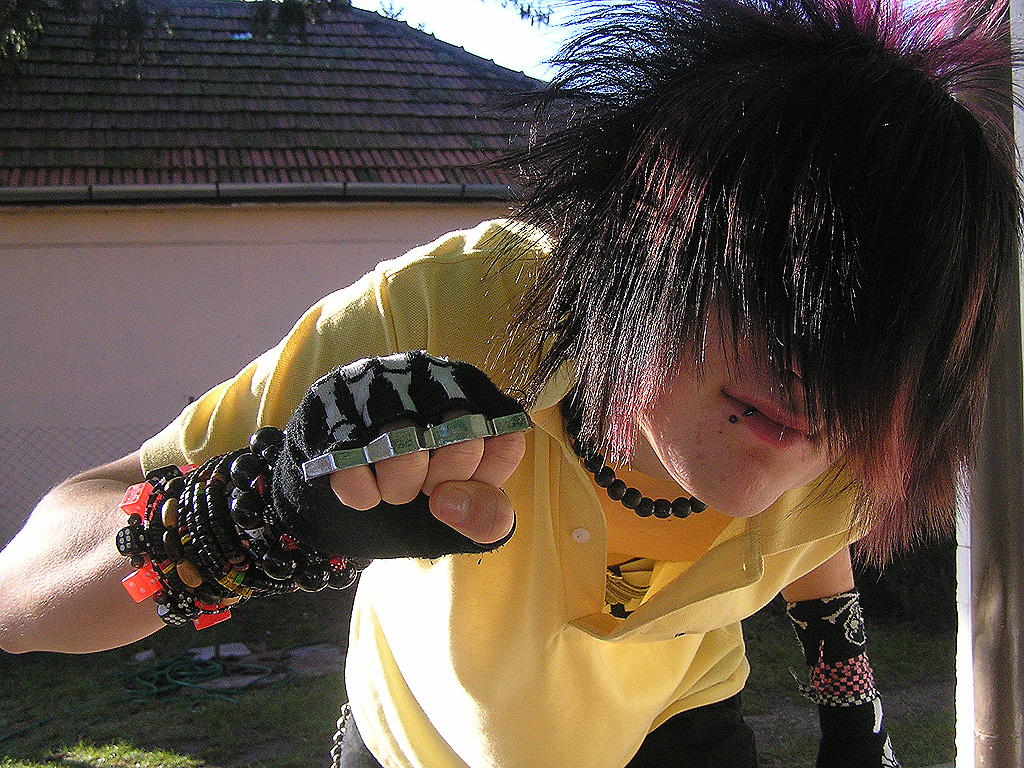
A scene kid in scene fashion (2009)

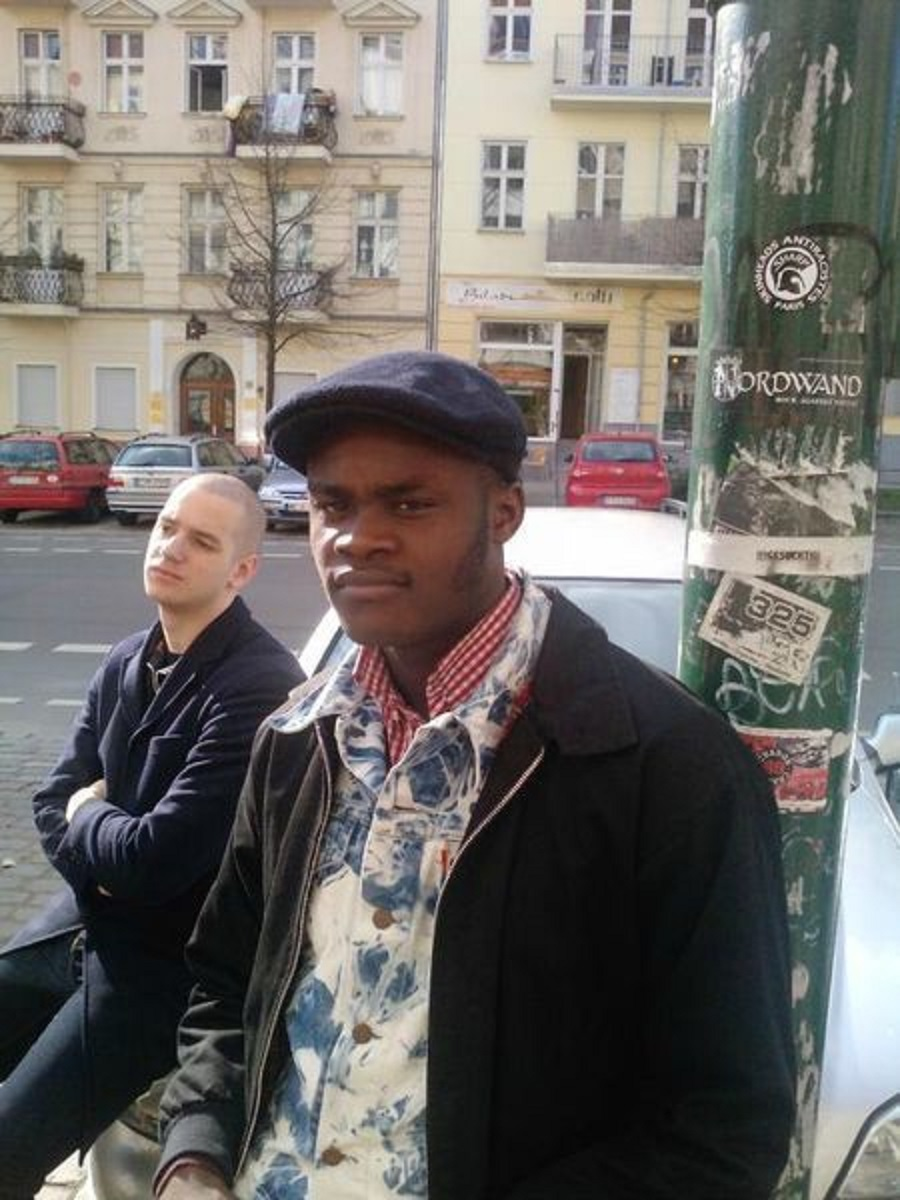
Two skinheads (2010)

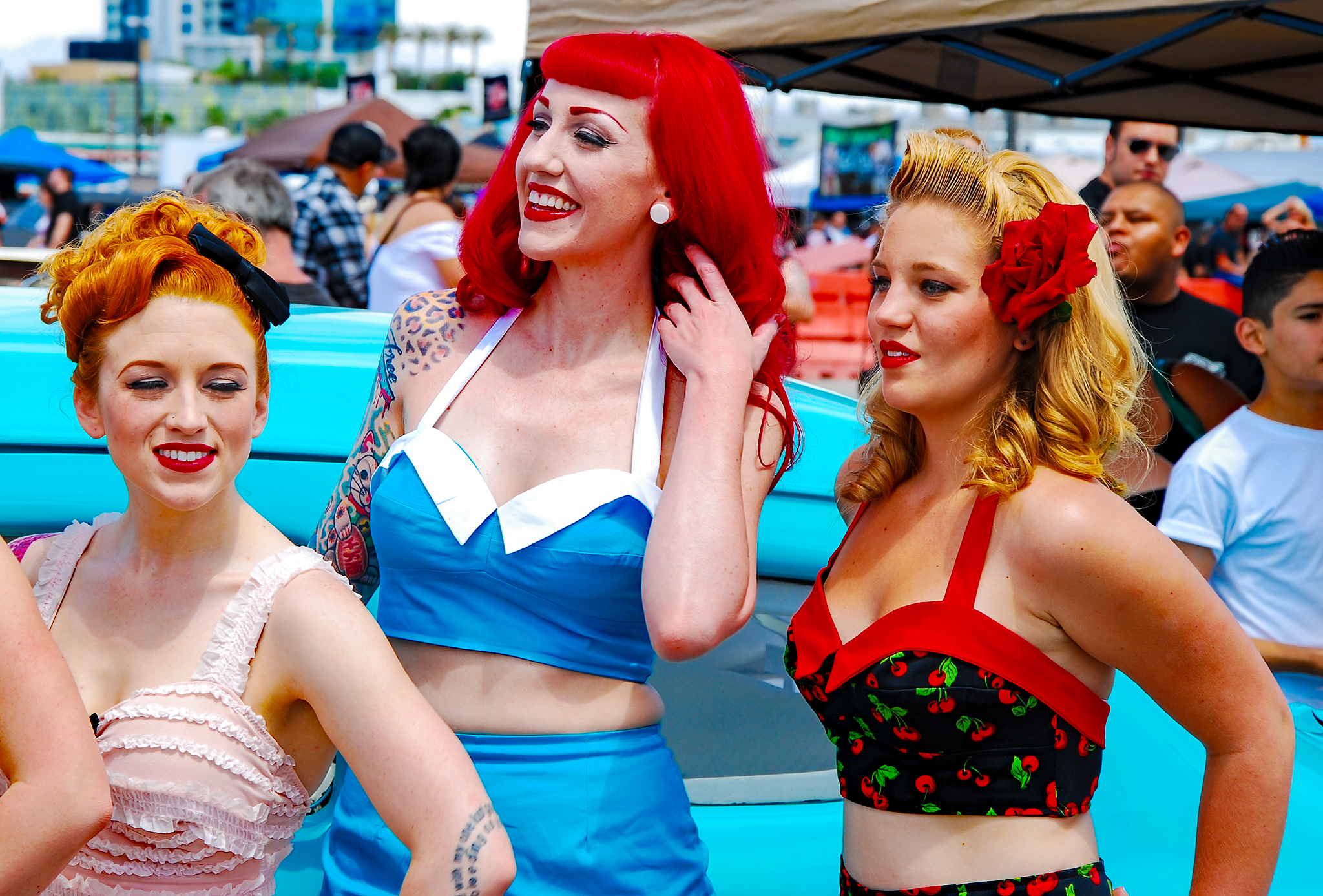
Three women in 1950s revivalist rockabilly clothing (2011)

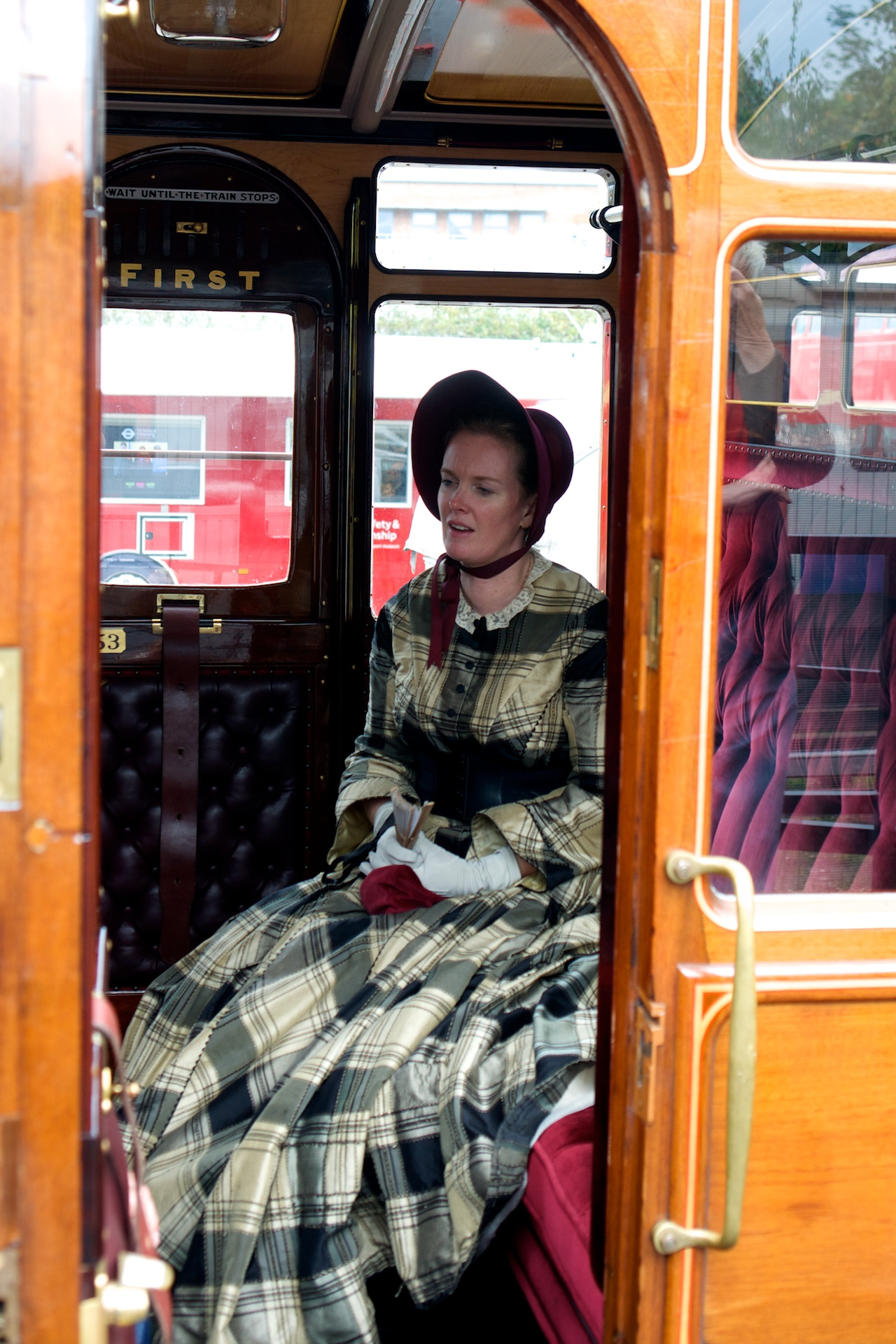
A woman in Neo-Victorian fashion (2013)

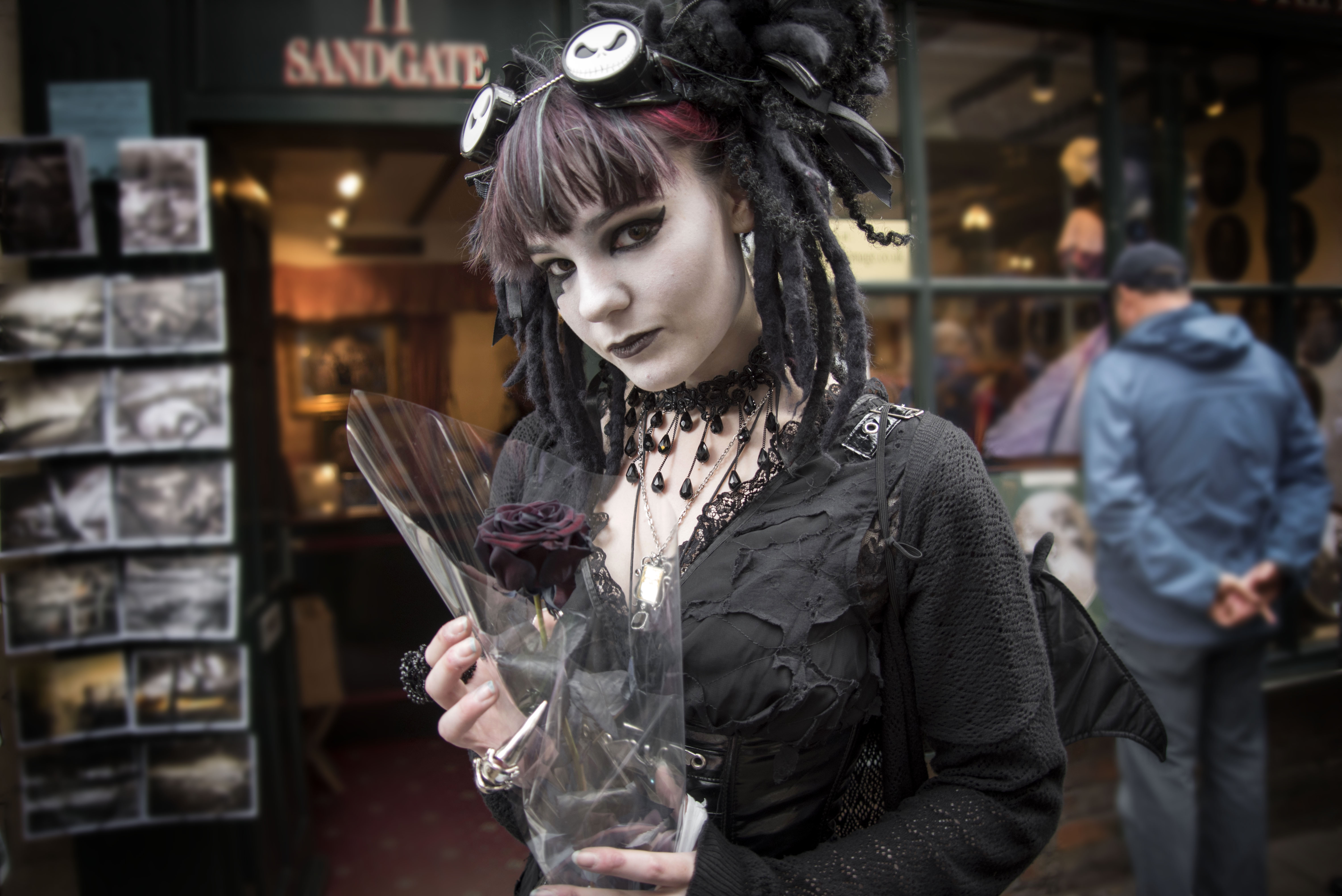
A goth in gothic fashion (2014)

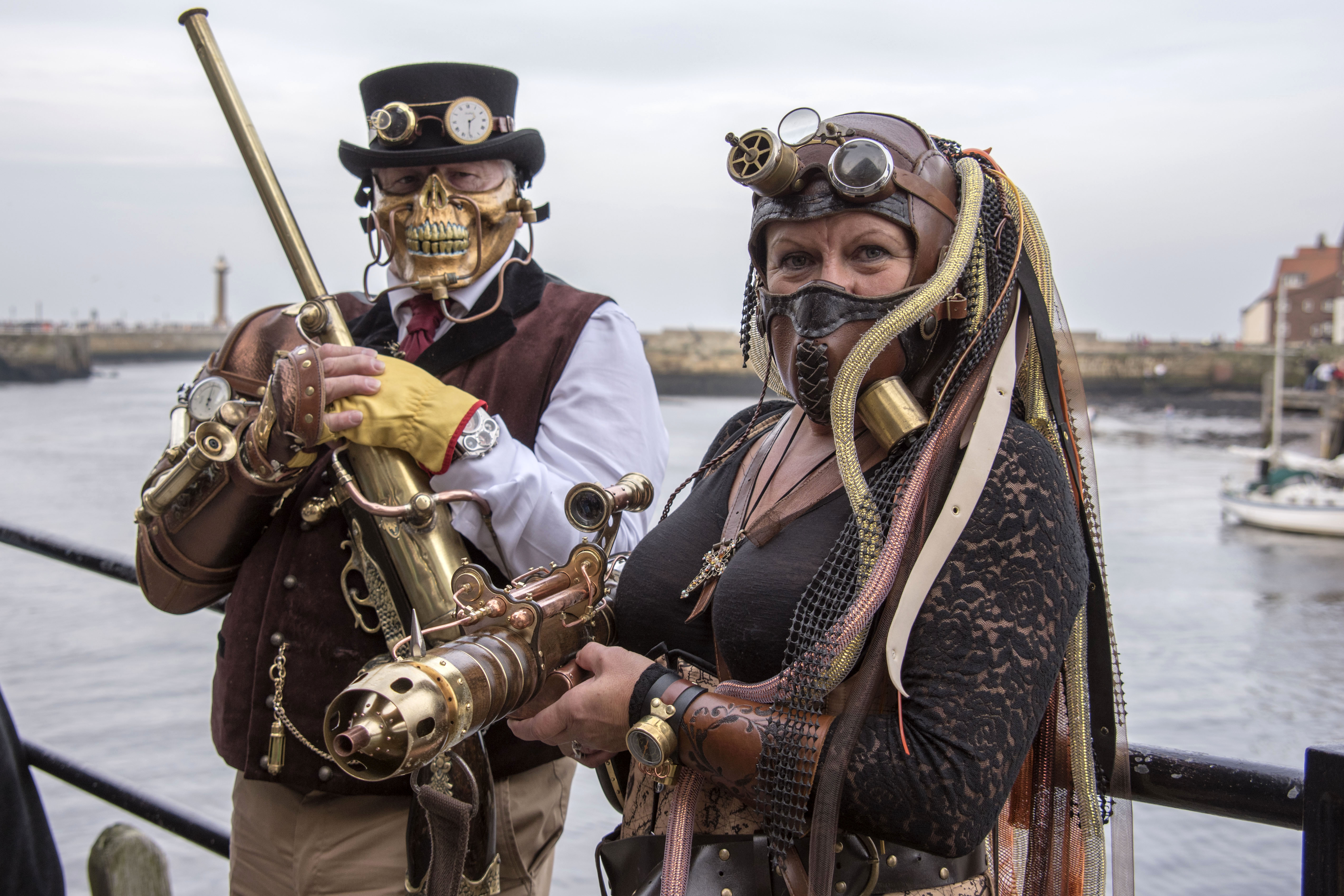
A man and woman in steampunk clothing (2014)

== See also ==
- Anti-fashion – Styles of dress contrary to popular fashion
- Subculture – Smaller culture within a larger culture
- List of subcultures
- Metal couture – Fashion accessory
- History of modern Western subcultures
- Youth subculture – Subcultures associated with young people
