= Yasmine Arrington =

American model and organizer

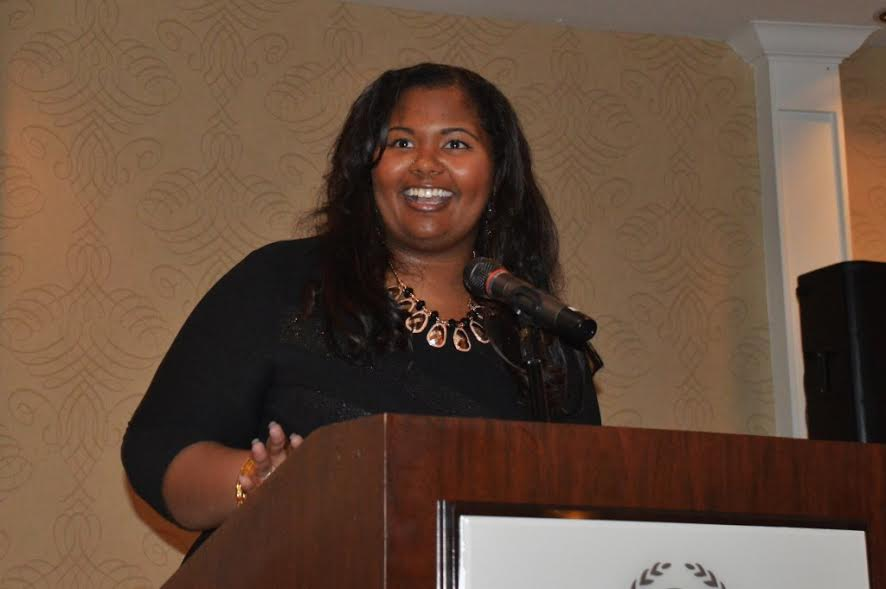
- Arrington speaking to the National Council of Negro Women
- Born: February 17, 1993 (age 33); Washington, DC
- Occupations: Plus-size model, motivational speaker, Founder and Executive Director of ScholarCHIPS

Yasmine Alexandra Arrington (born February 17, 1993) is the Founder and Executive Director of ScholarCHIPS and a 2015 winner of the Peace First Prize, the JM Kaplan Innovation Prize and DC Social Innovation Prize.

== Early life and education ==
Yasmine Arrington was born and grew up in Washington, D.C. From the time of her infancy until she was a teenager Arrington's father was often in prison. Arrington's mother died in her freshman year of high school. She attended Benjamin Banneker Academic High School in Northwest D.C., where she was in a program called LearnServe International, a DC non-profit that equips youth to be social changemakers. She studied Strategic Communications and History at Elon University in Elon, North Carolina. Arrington graduated in 2015. Arrington is a graduate student at Howard University School of Divinity.

== ScholarCHIPS ==
In 2010 Arrington founded ScholarCHIPS, a non-profit organization which provides high school graduates with incarcerated parents mentoring, support and funds to pursue higher education. As of July 2015 the organizations has given over $180,000 in scholarship funds to 61 scholars pursuing their educations in college. ScholarCHIPS also hosts an annual College Life Skills Conference which provides local youth with training on topics such as financial literacy, how to build credit, sexual health, healthy relationships, and professional development. ScholarCHIPS seeks to break down the stigma and burden of shame that comes with having an incarcerated parent. Today there are over 2 million youth in the United States with a parent in prison.

== Career ==
Arrington is a professional plus-size or curvy fashion model and motivational speaker. Arrington was named CurvySpokesmodel for Curves Rock Fashion Weekend 2013 and was named October 2015 Curvy Girl of the Month for CurvyGirlChronicles.net, a blog dedicated to body confidence, healthy curves and inner beauty.

Arrington has worked as a Public Relations intern with the Public Broadcasting Station, an Account Management intern at Ogilvy and Mather and as an Education Fellow with Hager Sharp. Arrington has been featured on numerous national radio, television, online and print outlets for her work such as Black Girls Rock, The Washington Post, the Baltimore Times, The Huffington Post, Forbes Magazine, TeenVogue, Essence, Black Enterprise, Daily Venus Diva Magazine, the Tom Joyner Morning Show, WJLA, WUSA9 and several others. Arrington has also been featured on two mega billboards in New York City.

== Awards and recognition ==
- Arrington is the 2013 recipient of the Iris Holt McEwen Community Service Award of the Omicron Delta Kappa society of Elon University.
- In 2012 she was featured on Black Entertainment Television's Black Girls Rock, and was given a Making A Difference award.
- She was a Jack Kent Cooke Foundation College Scholar in 2013.
- 2011 AXA National Achiever
- Abramson Foundation Scholar
- Washington Redskins College Success Foundation Leadership 1000 Scholar
- Linowes Leadership "Unsung Heroes Award" Youth Recipient.
- Winner of the 2015 Peace First Prize
- dec 2023

CNN heroes
