= Naki Depass =

Jamaican fashion model

- Born: Clarendon Parish, Jamaica
- Occupation: Model
- Modeling information
- Height: 1.80 m (5 ft 11 in)
- Hair color: Black
- Eye color: Brown
- Agency: Elite Model Management (New York City); MP Management (Paris); Why Not Model Management (Milan); Premier Model Management (London); Blow Models (Barcelona); Saint International Limited (Kingston) (mother agency)

Naki Depass is a Jamaican fashion model.

== Career ==
Depass debuted as an exclusive for Burberry and Prada, and a semi-exclusive for Céline; she also walked for Givenchy in her first season. She has walked for Balenciaga for 5 seasons. She has also walked for Isabel Marant, John Galliano, Giorgio Armani, Armani Privé, Hermès, Loewe, Valentino, Roberto Cavalli, Calvin Klein, Tory Burch, Salvatore Ferragamo, Jil Sander, Ralph Lauren, Victoria Beckham, and Off-White. Depass has appeared in i-D and Dazed editorials. Vogue Italia chose her as one of the "Top 50" black fashion models of 2016.

Depass has appeared in campaigns for Michael Kors, Mango, Balenciaga, and H&M.

== Personal life ==
Depass is studying accounting at the University of the West Indies.
