= MJ Long =

American architect

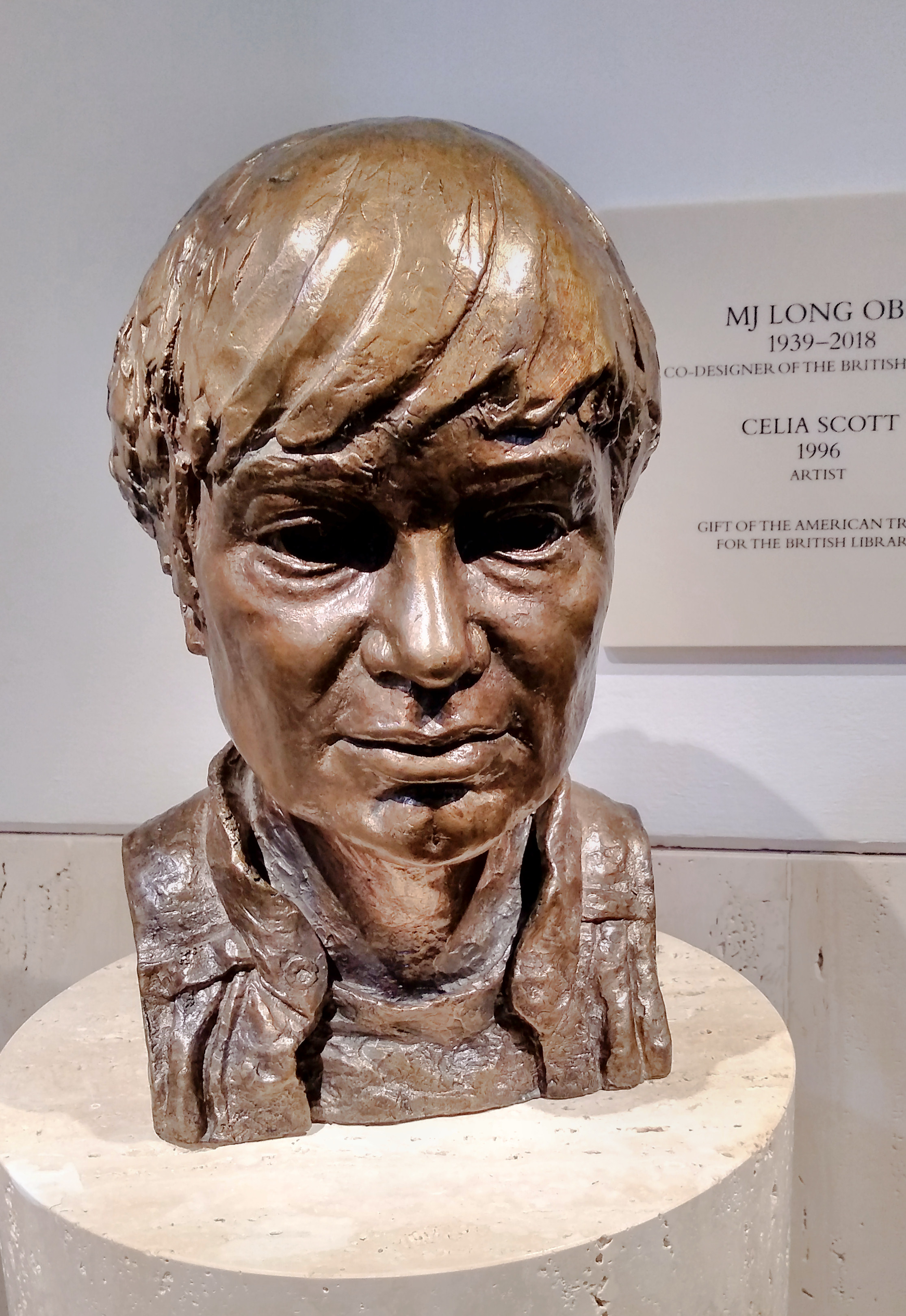
- Bust of Mary Jane Long by Celia Scott (1996) in the British Library
- Born: Mary Jane Long; July 31, 1939; Summit, New Jersey
- Died: September 3, 2018 (aged 79)
- Education: Yale University
- Occupation: Architect
- Spouse: Sir Sandy Wilson
- Children: 2
- Practice: Long & Kentish
- Buildings: British Library National Maritime Museum Cornwall Pallant House Gallery

Mary Jane Long, Lady Wilson, OBE (July 31, 1939 – September 3, 2018), known as MJ Long, was an American architect, lecturer and author, best known for her work as a principal architect partner on the British Library in London with her husband Sir Sandy Wilson. She created a series of purpose-built studios for the artists Peter Blake, RB Kitaj, Paul Huxley and Frank Auerbach, later documenting these in a book. In partnership with Rolfe Kentish as the practice Long & Kentish, she focused on designing museums, libraries and galleries, including the National Maritime Museum Cornwall, the Jewish Museum London in Camden Town and an extension to Pallant House Gallery. With Wilson, she also co-designed Spring House/Cornford House (1965) in Cambridge, for Christopher Cornford.

== Early life and education ==
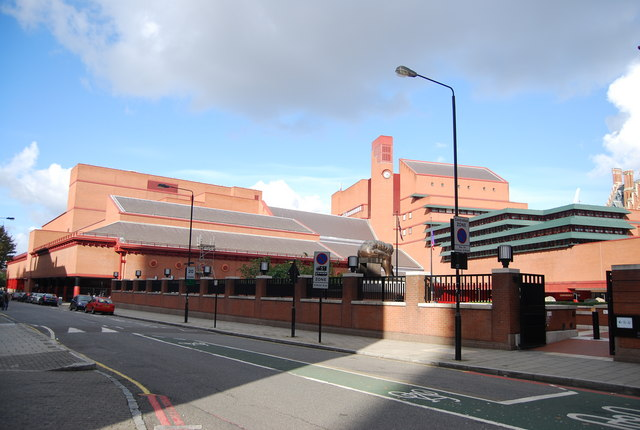
The British Library, London.

Long was born in Summit, New Jersey. She moved to Montreal, where she attended Westmount High School, graduating first in class in 1956. She studied at Smith College before enrolling on a four-year architecture course at Yale School of Architecture, studying under Paul Rudolph.

== Notable works ==
MJ Long was commissioned by RIBA to design the National Maritime Museum, Cornwall.

== Personal life ==
It was at Yale that she met Colin St John Wilson (Sandy), and in 1965 joined his newly formed architecture practice in London. The couple married in 1972. She had two children.

== See also ==
Long & Kentish website (external link) http://www.longkentish.com/practice.php

== Bibliography ==
- Long, MJ (2003). The architects' story: National Maritime Museum Cornwall. London: Long & Kentish architects.ISBN 9780954389505.
- Long, MJ (2009). Artists' studios. London: Black Dog. ISBN 9781906155728
- Wilson, Colin St John and MJ Long (2008). Kitaj: the architects. London: Black Dog. ISBN 9781906155445
