= Colin St John Wilson =

English architect

Sir Colin St John Wilson RA FRIBA
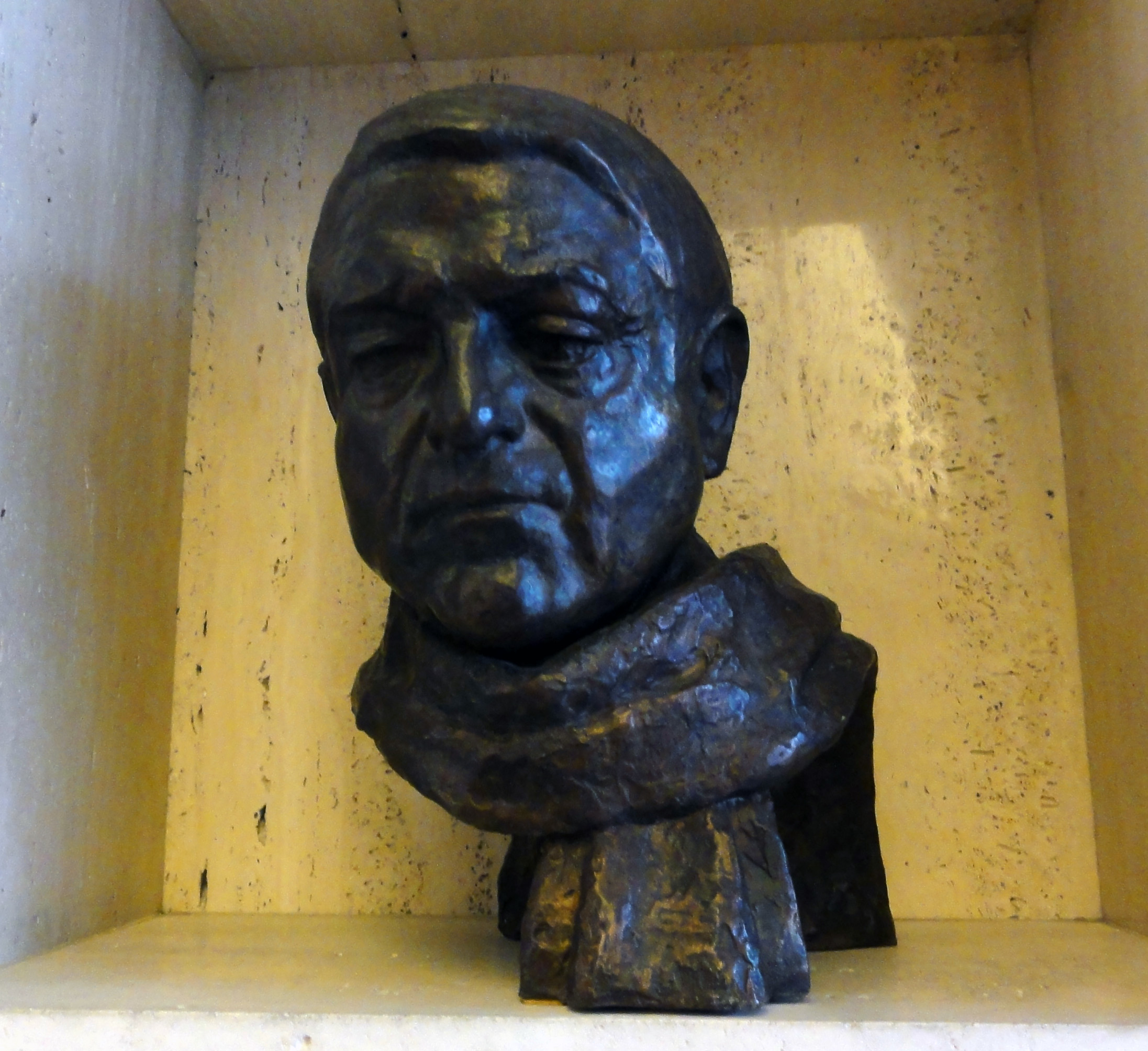
- Bust of Sir Colin St John Wilson by Celia Scott on display in the foyer of the British Library
- Born: Colin Alexander St John Wilson; 14 March 1922; Cheltenham, England
- Died: 14 May 2007 (aged 85)
- Resting place: Highgate Cemetery
- Education: Corpus Christi College, Cambridge
- Occupation: Architect
- Buildings: British Library, Pallant House Gallery, Spring House

Sir Colin Alexander St John Wilson, RA, FRIBA (14 March 1922 – 14 May 2007) was an English architect, lecturer and author. With his partner MJ Long, Wilson spent over 30 years progressing the project to build a new British Library in London, originally planned to be built in Bloomsbury and now completed near Kings Cross.

== Early life and education ==
Wilson was born in Cheltenham, the younger son of Henry Wilson, a Church of England clergyman who became Bishop of Chelmsford from 1929. His father was known as the "Red Bishop" as a result of his sympathy for the Republican cause in the Spanish Civil War. Wilson was educated at Felsted School, and he studied history and then architecture at Corpus Christi College, Cambridge from 1940 to 1942, when he joined the Royal Navy Volunteer Reserve.

Wilson served as a lieutenant in a Communication Squadron of the Fleet Air Arm in Europe during the Second World War and then India. He was demobilised in 1946.

He completed his studies under Sir Albert Richardson at the Bartlett School of Architecture at University College London, graduating as an architect in 1949.

== Career ==
=== London County Council ===
After graduating, Wilson worked at the London County Council architects department from 1950 to 1955, under the directorship of Sir Leslie Martin, alongside James Stirling, Alison and Peter Smithson, Alan Colquhoun, Peter Carter, and William Howell. His designs of this period include the Le Corbusier-inspired Bentham Road Estate, Hackney.

Wilson was involved with the Independent Group of artists at the Institute of Contemporary Arts in London, and he contributed to the seminal "This Is Tomorrow" exhibition at the Whitechapel Art Gallery in 1956.

=== University of Cambridge ===
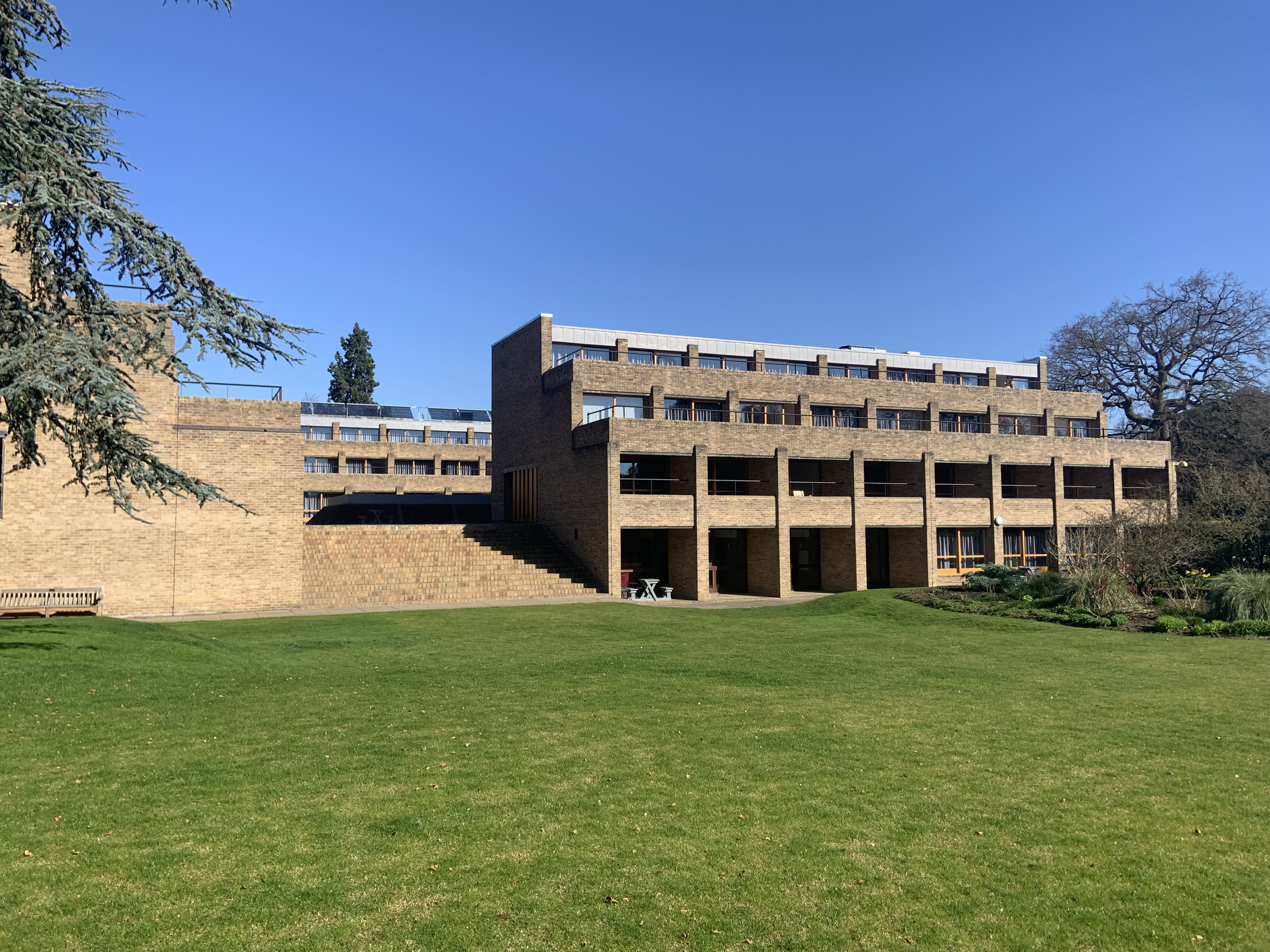
Harvey Court, Gonville & Caius, Cambridge.

Wilson was appointed as a lecturer in architecture at University of Cambridge in 1956, where Martin had been appointed Professor of Architecture. Wilson met Finnish architect Alvar Aalto through Martin and this had a major impact on his approach to architecture. He was a Fellow at Churchill College, Cambridge, from 1962 to 1971. He retired from teaching in 1969 to concentrate on his architectural practice. Wilson returned to Cambridge to become Professor of Architecture in 1975, stepping into shoes vacated by the early death of William Howell. He was a Fellow at Pembroke College, Cambridge, from 1977 to his death in 2007. He retired in 1989, becoming a professor emeritus.

As well as teaching together, Wilson and Martin also practised together as architects from offices in Cambridge, designing Harvey Court at Gonville and Caius College, Cambridge, which Wilson argues had an influence on Italian rationalist architecture, especially that of Aldo Rossi; an extension to the School of Architecture in Cambridge, a house for painter Christopher Cornford in Cambridge, and the Law, English and Statistical Libraries on Manor Road in Oxford; and other buildings in Cambridge and London.

Wilson designed his own home in Cambridge on Grantchester Road, built in 1961-64.

=== The British Library ===
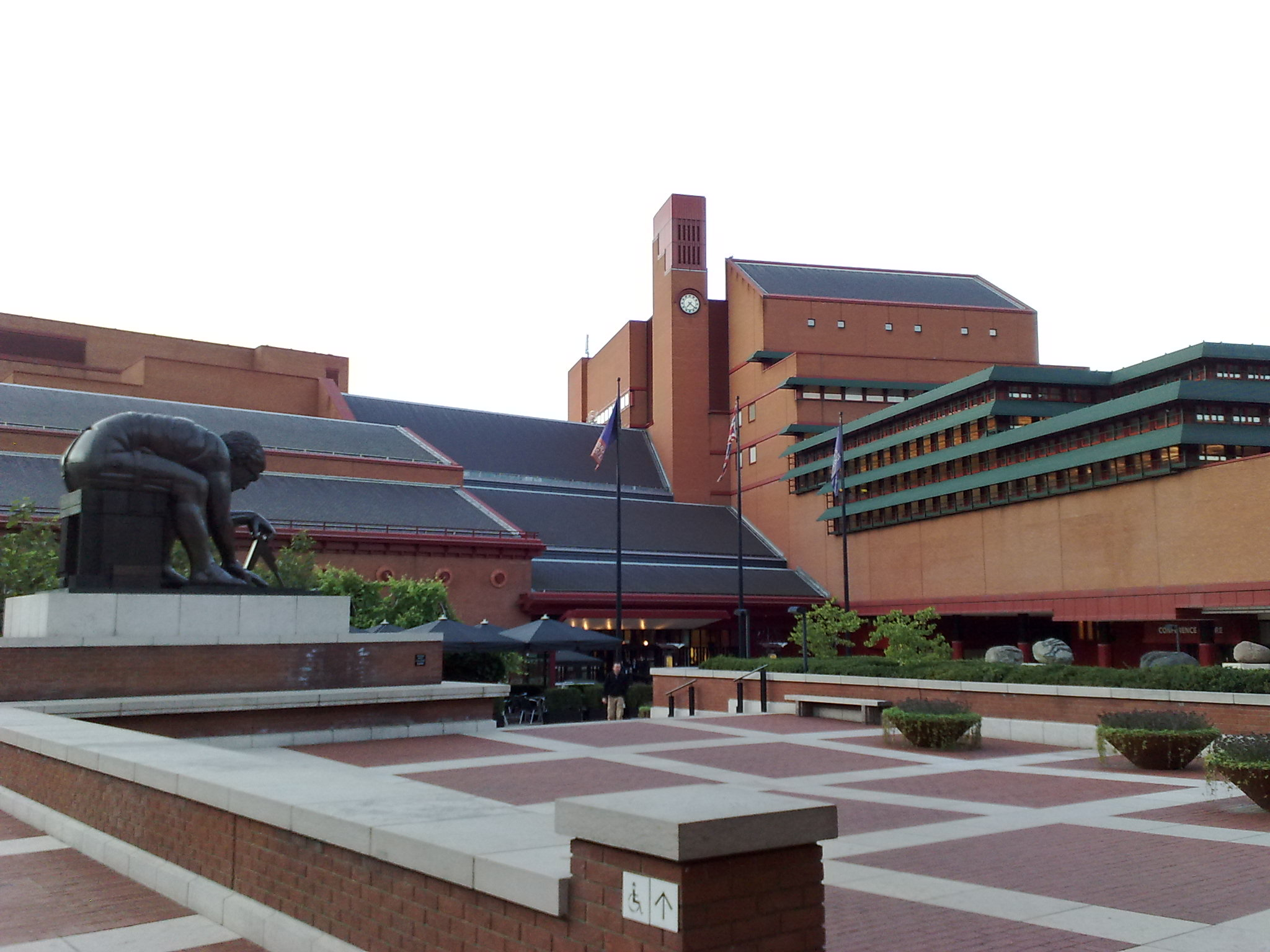
The piazza of the British Library featuring Newton by Eduardo Paolozzi.

In terms of architectural production, Wilson is best known for co-designing with MJ Long the current British Library building in London, begun in 1962 and finally completed – after a 35-year history of political wrangles, budget overspending and design problems – in 1997. Wilson described it as his "30-year war". The original scheme would have created a piazza to the south of the British Museum in Bloomsbury, but would have required the demolition of a large part of Bloomsbury. After a public protest, a new site was found further north, between Euston Station and St Pancras Station. A design was approved in 1978, but then delayed by the change of government after the 1979 general election, and ambitions were reduced amid rising costs.

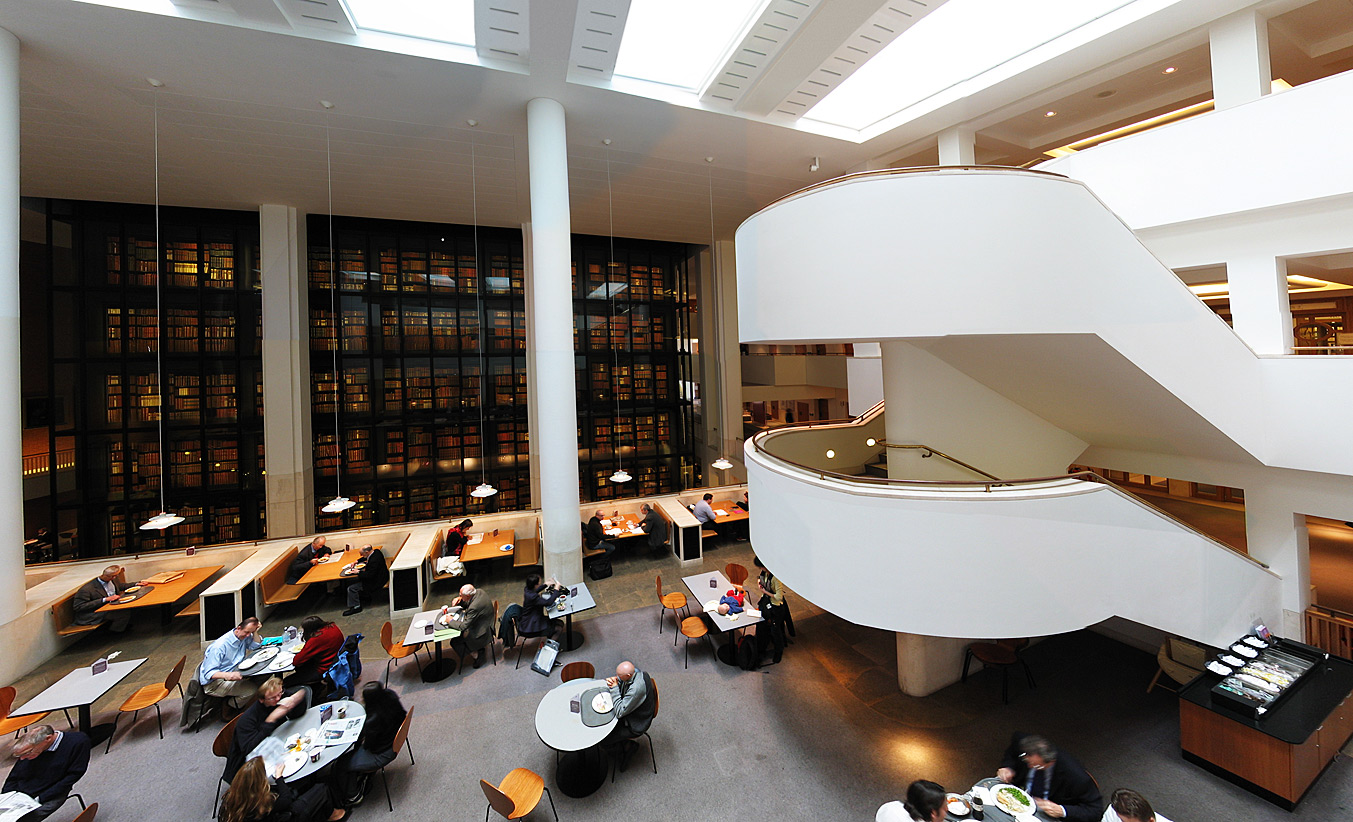
Interior of the British Library, with the smoked glass wall of the King's Library in the background.

The architecture of the huge building is influenced by several sources: the surrounding Victorian architecture in the St Pancras area of London and the collegiate architecture of Cambridge University. The use of finely detailed brickwork, multi-layer terraces, interplay of pitched roof elements and gradual stepping up of the entrance are all direct references to Aalto, in particular his Säynätsalo Town Hall. The entrance area features pendant lamps designed by the Finnish architect Juha Leiviskä, whom Wilson knew personally.

The British Library building was shortlisted for the RIBA Stirling Prize in 1998. An extension to the building opened in 2007, shortly before Wilson's death.

=== Pallant House Gallery ===
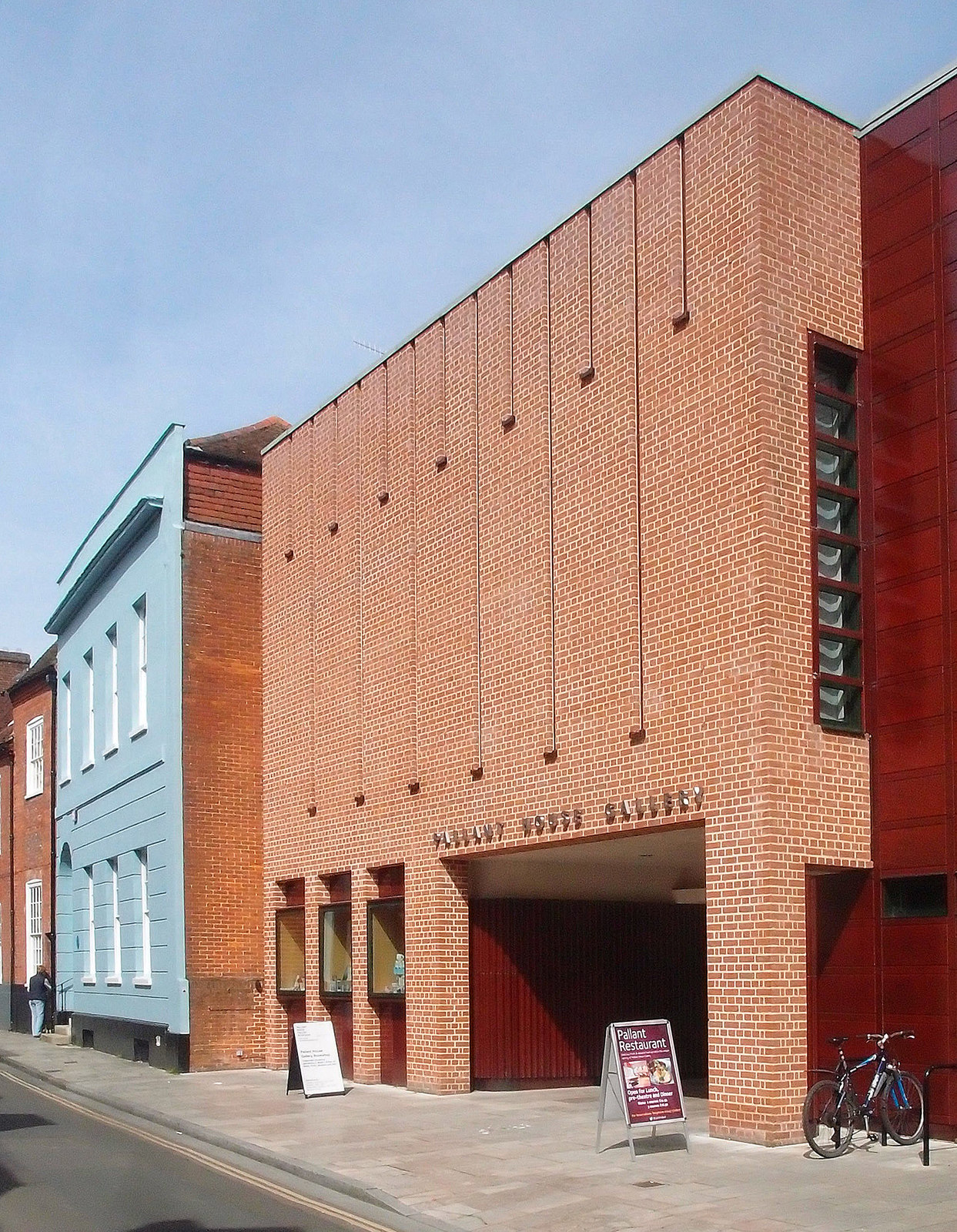
Facade of the Pallant House Gallery, Chichester

Wilson and Long & Kentish designed the new wing of Pallant House Gallery in Chichester, England, which opened in June 2006. The unashamedly modern block stands next to the original gallery, housed in a Grade I listed Queen Anne townhouse, was shortlisted for RIBA awards in 2007, and won the 2007 Gulbenkian Prize. Wilson also donated his share of his collection, owned jointly with MJ Long, of over 400 works of art to the gallery. Wilson's share of the collection, worth £5m, included works by Michael Andrews, Victor Willing, Peter Blake, David Bomberg, Patrick Caulfield, Lucian Freud, Richard Hamilton, R. B. Kitaj, Eduardo Paolozzi and Walter Sickert. Many of the works were acquired directly from the artists, who were friends of Wilson: indeed, he designed homes for several.

=== Unrealized designs ===
Wilson was commissioned to design the proposed Liverpool Civic and Social Centre, but the building was never finished, being deemed "fascist" by the council.

He also designed an extension for the British Museum, although only a reduced version of the scheme was partially realized.

=== Professional service and awards ===
He became a trustee of the Tate Gallery in 1974, and a trustee of the National Gallery in 1977, retiring from both positions in 1980. He was a member of the Royal Institute of British Architects and the Royal Academy. He was knighted in the 1998 New Year Honours for services to architecture, and was an Honorary Fellow at Churchill College from 1998 to 2007. He received honorary doctorates from the universities of Cambridge, Essex and Sheffield. He was a visiting professor at Yale four times (1960, 1964, 1983 and 2000) and at MIT from 1970 to 1972.

=== Publications ===
Wilson published two theoretical works, Architectural Reflections in 1992 and The Other Tradition of Modern Architecture in 1995, and The Artist at Work, on Michael Andrews and William Coldstream, in 1999.

Kitaj: the architects, co-written with MJ Long, was published posthumously in 2008. The book's name and front cover refer to a painting made by RB Kitaj of Wilson and Long, made while they were redesigning his home. The book's contents include diary entries recollecting Wilson and Long's own design processes, and their reflections on being painted by Kitaj.

== Personal life ==
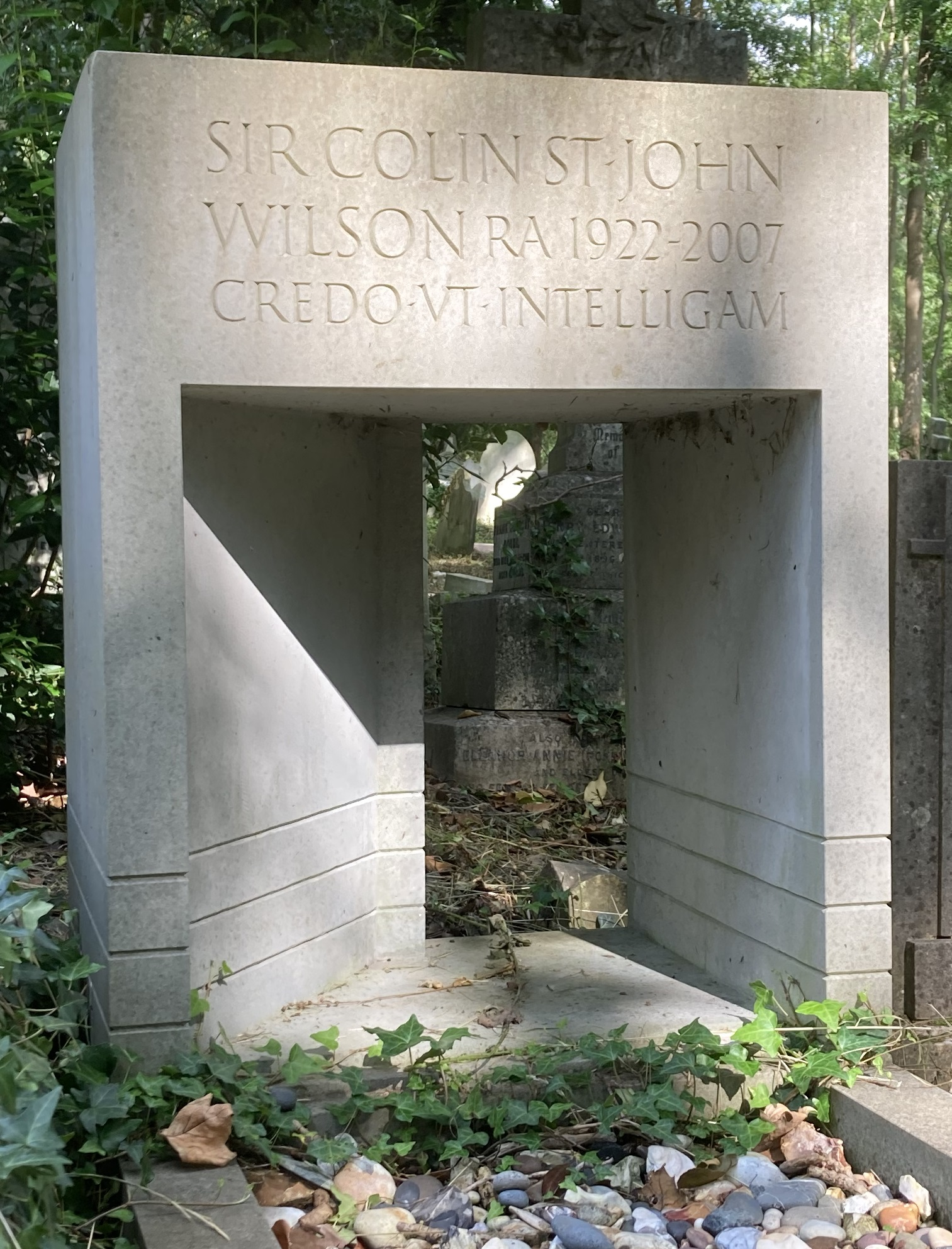
Grave of Colin St John Wilson in Highgate Cemetery

Wilson married twice. First he married Muriel Lavender in 1955, but they were divorced in 1971.

In 1972, Wilson married the American-born architect Mary Jane Long, who was later a founding partner of Long & Kentish architects. Together they had a son and a daughter. Long and Wilson often collaborated on design projects, including for The British Library and Pallant House Gallery.

Wilson died in 2007. He was survived by MJ Long, and their son and daughter. Wilson is buried on the east side of Highgate Cemetery.

National Life Stories conducted an oral history interview (C467/17) with Colin St John Wilson in 1996 for its Architects Lives' collection held by the British Library. A bust of Wilson by the sculptor Celia Scott is on display at the British Library.

== Sources ==
- Obituary, The Guardian, 16 May 2007
- Obituary, The Daily Telegraph, 16 May 2007
- Obituary, The Times, 17 May 2007
- Obituary, The Independent, 19 May 2007
- Biography from Pallant House Gallery
