= Paul Huxley =

British artist

Paul Huxley RA (born 12 May 1938) is a British painter.

== Biography ==
Huxley was born in London. He attended Harrow School of Art from 1951 to 1956, and the Royal Academy Schools from 1956 to 1960.

His first solo exhibition was in 1963 at the Rowan Gallery, London, where he continued to exhibit regularly for two decades. Huxley has taken part in group exhibitions since 1959, when he exhibited in 'Young Contemporaries', London. In 1964 he participated in 'The New Generation' exhibition at the Whitechapel Art Gallery with Patrick Caulfield, David Hockney, John Hoyland and Bridget Riley. More recently he has been part of group exhibitions at the Barbican (1993), the Gulbenkian Centre for Modern Art, Lisbon (1997), and Kettle's Yard, Cambridge and Leicester City Art Gallery (both 1999).

In 1964 Huxley travelled to the United States as first prize in the Stuyvesant Travel Awards. In 1965 he won a prize at the Paris Biennale and then a Harkness Fellowship which let him return to the U.S., where he lived in New York for two years. He won the Linbury Trust Award in 1977, first prize in the Eastern Arts Exhibition in 1983 and a National Art Collections award for Outstanding Service to the Arts in 1995.

He taught at the Royal College of Art from 1976, and was Professor of Painting there from 1986 until 1998, when he became professor emeritus. He has worked as a visiting lecturer at Glasgow School of Art.

He was commissioned to make 22 ceramic mural designs for King's Cross St Pancras tube station in 1984, and has also produced work for the Rambert Dance Company (1991) and Pallant House Gallery, Chichester (2001).

Huxley was a member of the advisory panels for the Arts Council of Great Britain and the Serpentine Gallery. From 1975 to 1982 he was a trustee of the Tate Gallery, and also served as chairman of its Exhibitions Committee. He was elected to the Royal Academy in 1987 and has been its treasurer since 2000.

== Solo exhibitions ==
- 2011 Gallery Reis, Singapore.
- 2011 Art in Focus, Charing Cross Hospital, London.
- 2009 Chang Art, Beijing.
- 2009 Watergate Gallery, Seoul, South Korea.
- 2008 Lyon & Turnbull, London.
- 2003 Rhodes + Mann, London.
- 2002 Rhodes + Mann, London.
- 2001 Pallant House Gallery, Chichester.
- 2001 Rhodes+Mann, London.
- 1999 New Art Centre, Roche Court, Salisbury.
- 1998 Jason & Rhodes Gallery, London.
- 1994 Gardner Art Centre, Sussex University.
- 1992 Gillian Jason Gallery, London.
- 1991 Galerie zur alten deutschen Schule, Thun, Switzerland.

== See also ==
- Royal Academy
