= Ian Stephenson =

English painter

Ian Stephenson RA (11 January 1934 – 25 August 2000) was an English abstract artist. Stephenson trained at King's College, Durham along with Noel Forster and had his first show in London at the New Vision Centre in 1958, with a solo show at The New Art Centre in 1962. An exhibition of his work was exhibited at the Hayward Gallery in 1977 and his work can be found in the collections of the Tate, the British Council and Whitworth Art Gallery. His work was also featured in the 1966 film, Blow-Up by Michelangelo Antonioni.

He returned to King's College, Durham to teach with Victor Pasmore and Richard Hamilton. Since his death, his work has been exhibited at the De La Warr Pavilion in Bexhill on Sea and the Baltic Centre for Contemporary Art in Gateshead.

Stephenson's work was characteristically made by splattering droplets of paint onto paper or canvas and repeating this with many different colours. Because the layers are applied quite widely the effect created in the finished paintings is determined not only by the colour and quantity of the spots of paint, but by the order in which they were applied.

In September 2010, Stephenson and five other British artists including Howard Hodgkin, John Walker, John Hoyland, Patrick Caulfield and R.B. Kitaj were included in an exhibition entitled The Independent Eye: Contemporary British Art From the Collection of Samuel and Gabrielle Lurie, at the Yale Center for British Art.

In his obituary, published in The Independent the painter Andrew Forge described his work as:

"Pictures of nothing which are about everything. Pictures of a limitless scale which are pictures of minute particulars. Countless happenings in time present as one simultaneous expression. Emptiness filled with matter. Solids filled with space."
