= Francis Thorne =

American composer

Francis Thorne (June 23, 1922 – March 7, 2017) was an American composer of contemporary classical music and grandson of the writer Gustav Kobbé.

== Life ==
Francis Burritt Thorne, Jr. was born in Bay Shore, New York. His father was a ragtime pianist. His grandfather, Gustav Kobbé, author of The Complete Opera Book, was a musical critic, particularly of the Wagnerian canon. Thorne was a student of Paul Hindemith at Yale University, before entering the U.S. Navy in 1942 where he served during World War II. After the war, he pursued a career on Wall Street and later, as a jazz pianist, after Duke Ellington heard him play the piano, and arranged an engagement for him at a New York jazz club.

From 1959 to 1961, he studied composition in Florence, Italy with David Diamond, who encouraged Thorne to incorporate his jazz sensitivities into his symphonic compositions. In December 1961, Thorne's first opera, Fortuna, premiered in New York City. In 1964 Eugene Ormandy and the Philadelphia Orchestra premiered his Elegy for Orchestra. In 1968, he was inducted into the American Academy and Institute of Arts and Letters. He spent much of his career championing the works of emerging composers. He served as director of the Walter W. Naumburg Foundation and the Thorne Music Foundation from 1965–1974, organizations which commission new works by young composers. In 1975, he founded the American Composers Orchestra with Dennis Russell Davies. The orchestra focuses on performing new compositions by American composers.

== Personal life ==
Francis Thorne married Ann Chauncey Cobb on December 9, 1942. Thorne died at Geer Nursing and Rehab in Canaan, Connecticut on March 7, 2017, aged 94. He was survived by his three daughters, four grandsons, five great-grandchildren, and a brother.

== Legacy ==
Many of his more than 100 compositions are characterized by a distinct jazz flavor. He was also one of the first classical composers to write for the electric guitar and electric bass guitar (Sonar plexus, 1968; Liebesrock, 1968–69). A discussion of his works appears in R. Tomaro: Contemporary Compositional Techniques for the Electric Guitar in United States Concert Music. The Francis Thorne Papers (1956–2004) are held by the New York Public Library.

== Awards ==
- 1995 Rome Prize

== Sources ==
- Tomaro, Robert. 1992. The New Grove Dictionary of Opera, 4 vols., edited by Stanley Sadie. London: Macmillan Press; New York: Grove's Dictionaries of Music, Inc.; ISBN 0-333-73432-7/ISBN 1-56159-228-5
