= Muriel Lavender Wilson =

Welsh arts director and curator (1933–2018)

- Born: Muriel Lavender; 26 April 1933; Sketty, Wales
- Died: 11 June 2018 (aged 85); London, England
- Education: Courtauld Institute of Art

Muriel Lavender Wilson (1933–2018) was an arts administrator, curator and jewellery historian. She is best known for raising awareness of British contemporary jewellery.

Wilson née Lavender was born on 26 April 1933 in Sketty, Wales. She attended the Courtauld Institute of Art. She was married to the architect Colin St John Wilson from 1955 to 1971.

Wilson was involved with the British Council where she served for a time as curator, and then as Director of Visual Arts. She curated the traveling exhibition 'All that glisters'...New Jewellery in Britain which presented works of contemporary British jewellers.

Wilson was a founding member of the Association for Contemporary Jewellery and founded its magazine Findings which she edited from 1998 to 2013. she also served on the Arts Council of Wales as well as the Contemporary Art Society.

She died on 11 June 2018 in London.
