= William August Kobbé =

United States Army general

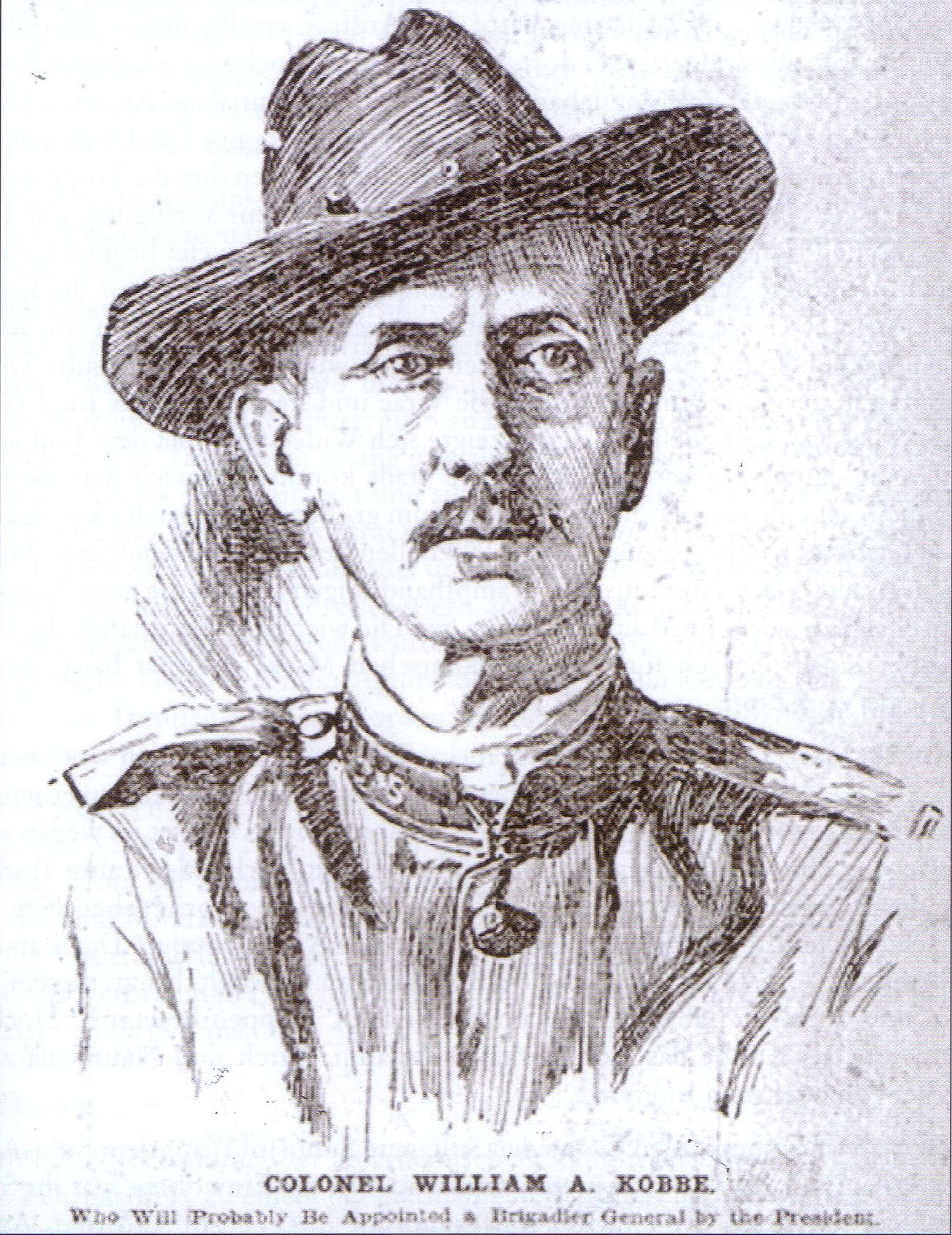
William August Kobbé

William Augustus Kobbé (May 10, 1840 – November 1, 1931) was a United States Army officer.

== Biography ==
Kobbé was born in New York City on May 10, 1840. His father, Carl Wilhelm Ludwig August Kobbé (1802–1881), was a German emigrant and part of the prominent Kobbe family (alternately Kobbeus or Kobbé), having served as the consul general of the duchy of Nassau in New York City. His mother, Sarah Lord Sistare, was a native of the United States descended from a Spanish sea captain whose vessel was lost off New London in the early 1700s.

Kobbé was educated in New York City and, from 1854 to 1857, in Wiesbaden, Germany. He studied mining engineering in Freiberg and Clausthal until 1862, when he enlisted in the 178th New York volunteers and served until the end of the Civil War, rising to rank of captain. He was brevetted lieutenant colonel of volunteers and major U.S. Army for gallantry at Nashville and at the capture of Fort Blakeley, Alabama. He was appointed 2nd lieutenant in the 19th U.S. Infantry (regular army) in 1866, serving on the frontier in New Mexico and Kansas during Indian hostilities.

In 1872, he was transferred to the 3rd U.S. Artillery. He graduated from the artillery school in 1873, and was in the Philippine service (see Spanish–American War and Philippine–American War), 1898–1901, as major of the 3d United States Artillery, colonel of the 35th United States Volunteers, brigadier-general of the United States volunteers and brigadier general of the United States Army.

He was in command of joint army and naval expedition to open the hemp ports to commerce and was made military governor of Mindanao and Jolo. He commanded the Department of Dakota at Saint Paul from 1902 until retired as major-general in 1904.

He was a member of the Military Order of the Loyal Legion of the United States and the Military Order of Foreign Wars.

== Family ==
On June 26, 1867, he married Isabella Hoffman at Ft. Leavenworth, Kansas. His son Ferdinand W. Kobbé (d. 1936) was commissioned in the Army in 1891, rose to the rank of colonel and served during World War I. His other sons, William, Eric and Herman, all served in the US Army as well. Gustav Kobbé, a New York music critic, was his brother.
