= Beverley Heath Hoyland =

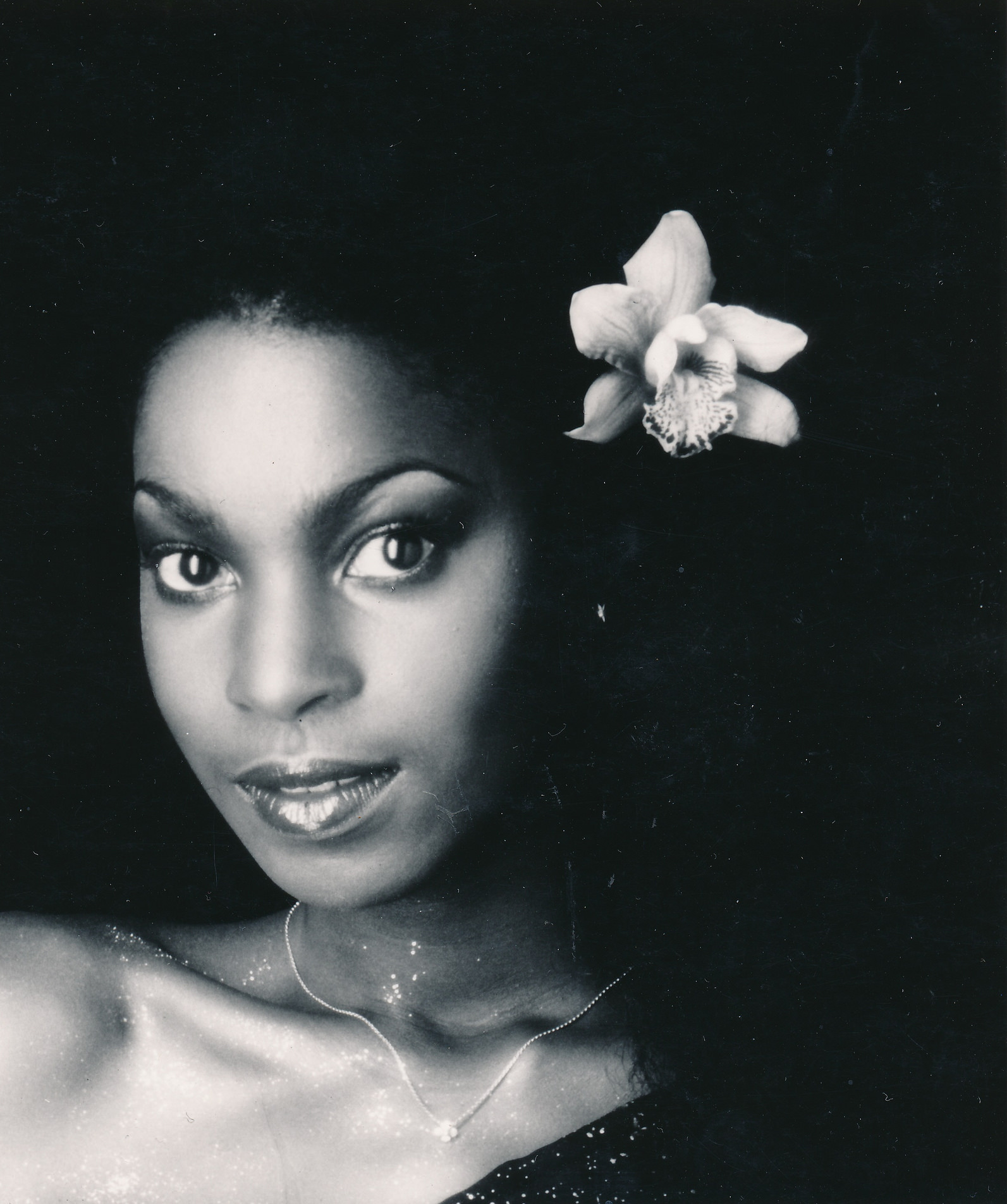
Beverley Heath - test shot taken by Tony Hutchings, 1975

Beverley Heath-Hoyland (born 18 November 1954) is a businesswoman, former model and widow of the artist John Hoyland.

== Early life and Modelling Career ==
Beverley Heath-Hoyland (née Beverley Heath) was born in Montego Bay on 18 November 1954. Her early years were spent in Jamaica with her grandmother, with Ms Heath joining her parents in the UK aged 9.

She broke into modelling accidentally when as a teenager a photo spread of her dressed in her school uniform and, in another picture, as a sultry young model was published in The Gleaner, a broadsheet newspaper in Jamaica.

By 1975 Beverley Heath was established as a model in London, having moved there in 1965. She had already won a series of titles: Miss Black Britain in 1971; Miss Caribbean Queen in 1974; Miss Variety Club of Great Britain and Miss West Indian in 1975 alongside regular work at fashion fairs and for boutiques across Europe, in TV commercials for the telecoms provider BT Group, British Rail, the car manufacturer Talbot, Imperial Leather, Avon Products and pop music promotion videos.

== Marriage to John Hoyland ==
Beverley Heath and John Hoyland entered into a relationship in the mid 70s Their mutual friend Ian Ritchie (architect) described Beverley Heath as having a 'particular sensitivity and understanding of John's need to be alone a lot of the time' combined 'with humour, style and beauty' which provided 'a rock in his life'.

In May 2008, John Hoyland entered London Bridge Hospital for emergency heart surgery. Beverley Heath and John Hoyland married on 28 June 2008. John Hoyland referred to Beverley Heath-Hoyland as his muse.

== Current career ==
Beverley Heath-Hoyland has been running the John Hoyland Estate since the artist's death in July 2011.

In July 2014 Beverley Heath-Hoyland announced the inaugural John Hoyland Scholarship at the Chelsea College of Arts in memory of the late John Hoyland with the stated aim of encouraging students from less privileged backgrounds to apply for the College's MA course in Fine Art by fully funding their course fees.

In May 2015 Hoyland Studio Ltd, part of the John Hoyland Estate run by Beverley Heath-Hoyland, provided funding for two classrooms to be built at Anchovy Primary School, St James, Jamaica.
