= Frank Dunphy =

Businessman and talent agent (1937–2020)

Frank Dunphy (27 November 1937 – 23 August 2020) was an Irish-born, British-based business manager, entrepreneur and accountant. He represented the interests of such artists and actors as Damien Hirst, Tracey Emin, Jake and Dinos Chapman and Ray Winstone.

== Early life in Ireland ==
Dunphy was born in Portrane. His father was a nurse and his mother was a republican activist and member of Cumann na mBan. He was married to Lorna.

== Career ==
Dunphy moved to England in the early 1950s and began his career in representation advising performers including Coco the Clown, Harry Worth, and Roy Castle. He reputedly charged his clients 10% of all sales/income revenue.

== Damien Hirst ==
Dunphy has represented artist Damien Hirst since 1995. He claimed he was first asked to represent artist Hirst by Hirst's mother, Mary, a claim which the artist has disputed.

In 2018, Dunphy and his wife gave six works by Young British Artists to the Pallant House Gallery, Chichester, including Butterfly by Hirst.
