= Antony Peattie =

British music writer

Antony Peattie is a British music writer. He co-edited the 1997 revision of The New Kobbé's Opera Book, with Lord Harewood.

== Career ==
Peattie was publications editor at Welsh National Opera, before leaving to help launch Opera Now magazine, and then going freelance, creating Opera Bites for Glyndebourne, surtitles for Scottish Opera and supertitles for the Royal Opera.

== Personal life ==
For around 25 years, Peattie lived with the artist Sir Howard Hodgkin until Hodgkin's death in March 2017. They lived in a four-storey Georgian house in Bloomsbury, near the British Museum.

== Selected publications ==
- The Private Life of Lord Byron
- The New Kobbé's Opera Book, (1997 revision), edited with Lord Harewood, New York: G. P. Putnam's Sons. London: Ebury Press. ISBN 0091814103
