= John Hoyland =

English painter (1934–2011)

- Lebanon, 2007, acrylic on cotton duck, 60 x 55 inches
- Born: 12 October 1934; Sheffield, United Kingdom
- Died: 31 July 2011 (aged 76)
- Education: Sheffield School of Art; Royal Academy Schools
- Known for: Painting
- Awards: Appointed Professor of Painting at the Royal Academy Schools (1999)

John Hoyland RA (12 October 1934 – 31 July 2011) was a London-based British artist. He was one of the country's leading abstract painters.

== Early life ==
John Hoyland was born on 12 October 1934, in Sheffield, Yorkshire, to a working-class family, and educated at Sheffield School of Art and Crafts within the junior art department (1946–51) before progressing to Sheffield College of Art (1951–56), and the Royal Academy Schools, London (1956–60), where Sir Charles Wheeler, the then President of the Royal Academy, ordered that Hoyland's paintings – all abstracts – be removed from the walls of the Diploma Galleries. It was only the intervention of Peter Greenham (Acting Keeper of the Schools) that saved the day, when he reminded Wheeler that Hoyland had painted admired landscapes and figurative paintings– evidence that he could "paint properly".

In 1953, Hoyland went abroad for the first time, hitch-hiking with a friend to southern France. After the bleakness of Sheffield it was a revelation: "To me it was like landing in Tahiti. There was still rationing here. Down there were all these brown girls, swimming and diving, and all these grapes." Hoyland visited again in 1957 with David Smith when he was at the Royal Academy, and succumbed to what he referred to as "the Gauguin syndrome", a lifelong romance with travel and the south.

== Career ==
The 1960s were a crucial decade for Hoyland starting in 1960 with the first of 3 annual London shows featuring large abstract pictures at least 30 feet square aimed at filling the viewers field of vision and dubbed as Situation (short for '' Situation in London now''); it was in these years that he found his voice as an artist. It was also the time when he made his first trip to America, to New York in 1964, travelling on a Peter Stuyvesant Foundation bursary. There he met Robert Motherwell, with whom he was to become great friends, also Mark Rothko and Barnett Newman, and visited their studios. Hoyland's first solo exhibition was held at the Marlborough New London Gallery in 1964 and his first solo museum show at the Whitechapel Art Gallery in 1967, curated by Bryan Robertson. In the 1960s, Hoyland's work was characterised by simple shapes, high-key colour and a flat picture surface. In the 1970s, his paintings became more textured. He exhibited at the Waddington Galleries, London throughout the 1970s and 1980s. During the 1960s and 1970s, he showed his paintings in New York City with the Robert Elkon Gallery and the André Emmerich Gallery. His paintings are closely aligned with Post-Painterly Abstraction, Color Field painting and Lyrical Abstraction. Hoyland disliked the 'abstract' painter label, describing himself simply as 'a painter'. When asked why he disliked the term 'abstraction', he answered: 'It's just too abstract a word. It smacks always of geometry to me, of rational thought. There's no geometry, there's no rectangles in nature, no real straight lines. There's only the circle, the one really powerful form in nature I keep getting drawn back to.'

Retrospectives of his paintings have been held at the Serpentine Gallery (1979), the Royal Academy (1999) and Tate St Ives (2006). In 1982, he won the John Moores Painting Prize and in 1998 the Royal Academy's Wollaston Award.

His works are held in many public and private collections, including the Tate and Damien Hirst's Murderme Collection. In September 2010, Hoyland and five other British artists including Howard Hodgkin, John Walker, Ian Stephenson, Patrick Caulfield and R.B. Kitaj were included in an exhibition entitled The Independent Eye: Contemporary British Art from the Collection of Samuel and Gabrielle Lurie, at the Yale Center for British Art.

Hoyland was elected to the Royal Academy in 1991 and was appointed Professor of Painting at the Royal Academy Schools in 1999. The National Portrait Gallery holds portraits of the artist in its collection.

== Death ==
Hoyland died on 31 July 2011 aged 76, of complications following heart surgery undertaken in 2008. He was survived by his wife Beverley Heath Hoyland and his son Jeremy, from his first marriage to Airi Karakainen.

== Books ==
- Hoyland, John (1988). Hans Hofmann, late paintings. Tate Gallery. ISBN 978-0-946590-88-9.
