= Gustav Kobbé =

American music critic and author

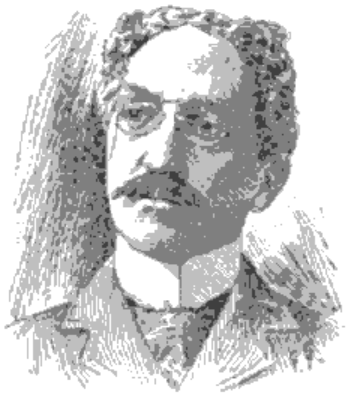
- Kobbe in 1900
- Born: March 4, 1857; New York, New York
- Died: July 27, 1918 (aged 61); Great South Bay, New York
- Education: Columbia University
- Occupations: Critic, writer
- Spouse: Carolyn Wheeler (m. 1882)
- Relatives: William August Kobbé (brother)

Gustav Kobbé (March 4, 1857 – July 27, 1918) was an American music critic and author, best known for his guide to the operas, The Complete Opera Book, first published (posthumously) in the United States in 1919 and the United Kingdom in 1922.

== Life and career ==
Kobbé was born in March 1857 in New York City, to Wilhelm August Kobbé (1802–1881) and Sarah Lord Sistare Kobbé. His father was born in Idstein, near Wiesbaden, in the Duchy of Nassau (now part of Germany), and represented that duchy in New York as consul general until it was absorbed by the Kingdom of Prussia in 1866. His mother was born in New London, Connecticut, to a prominent New England family.

When Gustav Kobbé was ten years old, he was sent to Wiesbaden to study musical composition and piano with Adolf Hagen. Following five years of study in Germany, he returned to New York City for additional study with Joseph Mosenthal. Afterward, he graduated from Columbia College in 1877 where he was a member of the Philolexian Society, and two years later from Columbia Law School. He received his M.A. from Columbia in 1880. In 1882, he married Carolyn Wheeler.

He made his career in literary and newspaper work, and contributed articles on musical and dramatic subjects to the leading magazines and periodicals. His hobby was sailing, and it was while he was out in the Great South Bay off Bay Shore, New York, in July 1918, that a seaplane, coming down for a landing, struck his boat and killed him instantly.

=== Literary work ===
Kobbé began his literary career as co-editor of the Musical Review. He was on the staff of the The Sun in New York in 1881, and in 1882 was sent as correspondent to Bayreuth, Germany, by the New York World for the first performance of Parsifal. He contributed many articles – on music, drama and travel – to the leading American magazines of his day, The Century Magazine, Scribner's Magazine, The Forum, North American Review, Ladies' Home Journal, The Delineator, etc. He became music critic of The New York Herald when that newspaper was owned by James Gordon Bennett, remaining with it for eighteen years.

He was on the point of completing the book which was afterwards published as The Complete Opera Book when he died. Various additions were made to it before publication, and the work in its original form was edited by Katharine Wright, who at the same time included some additional operas in sections that bear her initials. Its full title was The Complete Opera Book : the Stories of the Operas, Together with 400 of the Leading Airs and Motives in Musical Notation.

=== Notable works ===
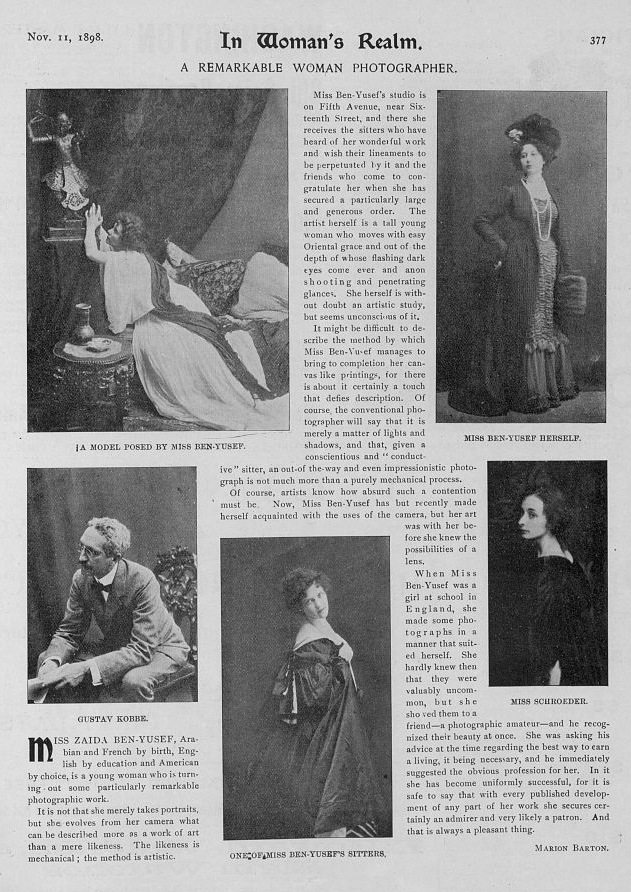
Gustav Kobbé (sitting down left)

- The Ring of the Nibelung (1887) reprinted in Wagner's Life and works
- Wagner's Life and works (two volumes, 1890)
- New York and its Environs (1891)
- The New Jersey Coast and Pines: An Illustrated Guide-book (with Road-maps) (1891)
- Plays for Amateurs (1892)
- My Rosary, and Other Poems (1896)
- Miriam (1898)
- Signora, a Child of the Opera House, a novel (1902)
- Famous Actors & Actresses And Their Homes (1903)
- Wagner's Music-Dramas Analyzed (1904), with which were combined his other later Wagner works
- The Loves of Great Composers (1905)
- Wagner and His Isolde (1905)
- Opera Singers (1905, sixth edition revised, 1913)
- Famous American Songs (1906)
- How to Appreciate Music (New York: Moffat, Yard & Company, 1906)
- The Pianolist (1907)
- Portrait Gallery of Great Composers (1911)
- A Tribute to the Dog-Including the Famous Tribute by Senator Vest (1910 & 1911)
- Modern Women (1916)
- The Complete Opera Book (1919 & 1922), continued for several editions by the Earl of Harewood

He was editor of the Lotus Magazine from 1909 to 1918.

== Family ==
Gustav's brother, Major General William August Kobbé (1840–1931), served with the United States Army. His grandson, Francis Thorne, is a well known composer. Through his daughter, Virginia, Kobbé is the great-great-grandfather of actor Justin Theroux.
