= Pallant House Gallery =

British art museum

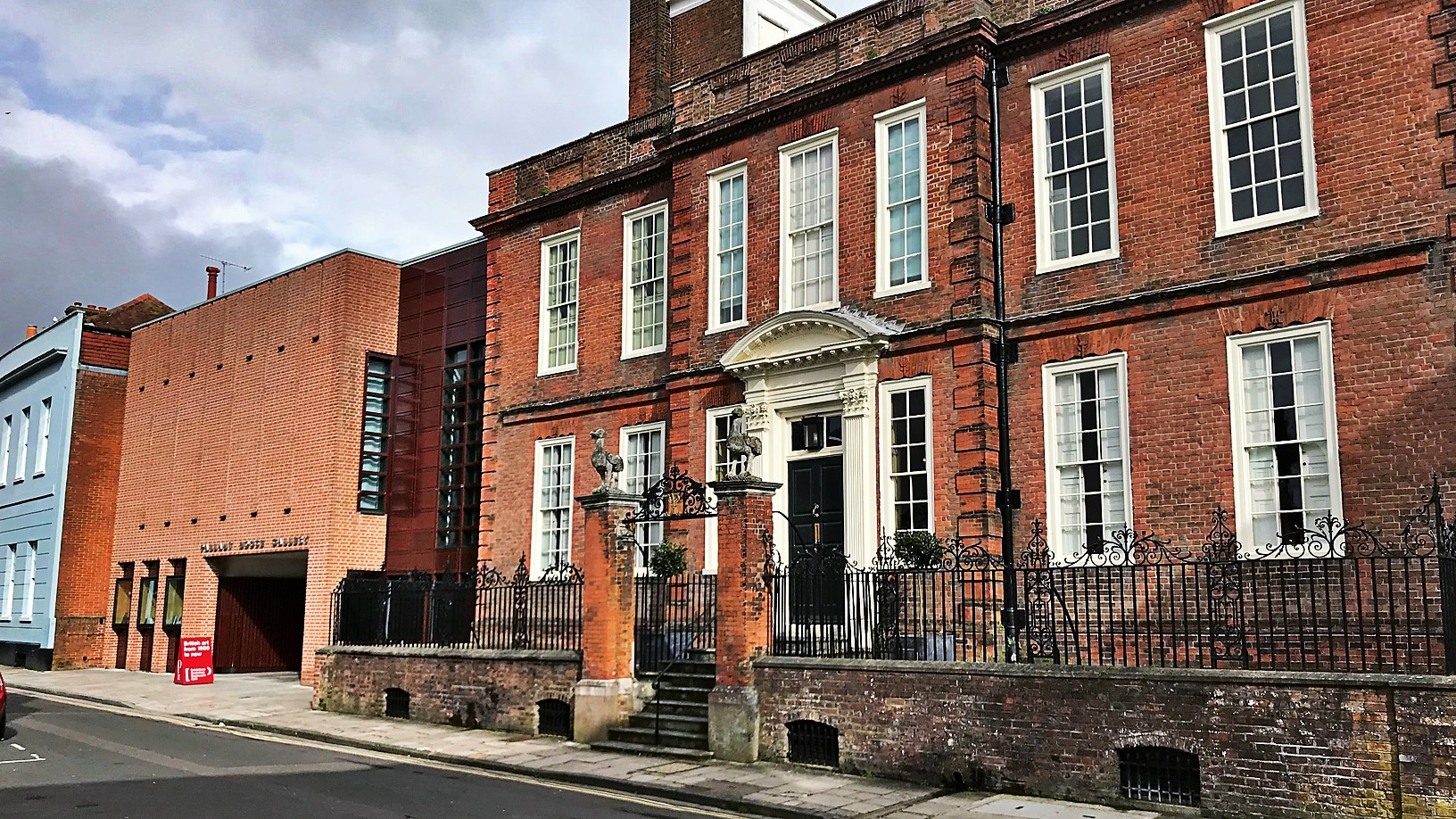
- The gallery extension, with Pallant House on the right

- Location of Pallant House Gallery
- Established: 1982
- Location: North Pallant, Chichester, West Sussex
- Coordinates: 50.835109°N 0.777800°W
- Type: Art Gallery
- Director: Simon Martin
- Architects: Colin St John Wilson, MJ Long
- Website: pallant.org.uk

Pallant House Gallery is an art gallery in Chichester, West Sussex, England. It houses one of the best collections of 20th-century British art in the world.

== History ==
The Gallery's collection is founded on works left to the city of Chichester by Walter Hussey in 1977, which included works by Barbara Hepworth, Henry Moore, Ivon Hitchens, John Piper, Ceri Richards and Graham Sutherland. Hussey stipulated that the collection must be shown in Pallant House.

In 1989, Charles Kearley bequeathed works by, among others, British artists such as John Piper and Ben Nicholson and European artists such as Paul Cézanne, André Derain, Fernand Léger, and Gino Severini.

In 2006, Colin St John Wilson donated works by Michael Andrews, Peter Blake, David Bomberg, Patrick Caulfield, Lucian Freud, Richard Hamilton, R. B. Kitaj, Eduardo Paolozzi, Walter Sickert and Victor Willing.

In 2002 the Gallery received a collection of 18th-century Bow porcelain, donated by Geoffrey Freeman. It later donated the collection to the Holburne Museum in Bath as part of a deaccession programme approved by the Trustees of Pallant House Gallery in 2020.

In 2018, Frank and Lorna Dunphy gave six works by Young British Artists to the Pallant, including Butterfly by Damien Hirst.

== The collection ==
The Gallery's collection is founded on works left to the city of Chichester by Walter Hussey in 1977, on his retirement from the position as Dean of Chichester Cathedral which he held from 1955. Hussey's collection included works by Barbara Hepworth, Henry Moore, John Piper, Ceri Richards and Graham Sutherland. Hussey stipulated that the collection must be shown in Pallant House.

The Gallery's collection has been augmented by other donations. In 1989, property developer Charles Kearley donated works by British artists such as John Piper and Ben Nicholson and European artists such as Paul Cézanne, André Derain, Fernand Léger, and Gino Severini. In 2006, architect Sir Colin St John Wilson donated works by Michael Andrews, Peter Blake, David Bomberg, Patrick Caulfield, Lucian Freud, Richard Hamilton, R. B. Kitaj, Eduardo Paolozzi, Walter Sickert and Victor Willing. Many of the works were acquired directly from the artists, who were friends of Wilson: indeed, he designed homes for several. Other works are displayed on long-term loan, many on the understanding that they will be donated to the gallery in due course. As well as modern British art, the Gallery had one of the world's outstanding collections of 18th-century Bow porcelain, donated by Geoffrey Freeman, but it has since been transferred to the Holburne Museum in Bath.

== Exhibitions ==
From October 2015 to February 2016 the Gallery mounted an exhibition, Evelyn Dunbar: The Lost Works; 500 paintings by Evelyn Dunbar that had disappeared after her death in 1960 and rediscovered in 2013, doubling the number of her known works.

In 2016, the Gallery mounted an exhibition entitled John Piper: The Fabric of Modernism of Piper's textile designs.

In 2019, the Gallery mounted an exhibition entitled Ivon Hitchens: Space Through Colour "Ivon Hitchens: Space Through Colour".

In 2021, the Gallery mounted an exhibition entitled Glyn Philpot: Flesh and Spirit. This was the first major exhibition of Glyn Philpot's work since an exhibition at the National Portrait Gallery in 1984.

Other exhibitions at Pallant House include Gwen John (2023), Sussex Landscape (2022-2023), Glyn Philpot (2022), Hockney to Himid: 60 Years of British Printmaking (2021-2022), and David Remfry (2015).

== Pallant House ==
Pallant House is a Grade I listed Queen Anne townhouse built in 1712 for wine merchant Henry "Lisbon" Peckham and his wife Elizabeth. It is a fine, brick-built building with large windows, with stone ostriches from the Peckham family arms guarding the entrance gateway, and a fine oak staircase inside. Its urbane design from a London architect was the subject of a suit in Chancery, for William Smart, mason of Chichester, provided a design about 1711, but the Peckhams went to London and obtained another design, designated "the London modell" in court papers. The architect was not identified.

The building had been used as council offices since 1919. The building was restored in 1979, and the gallery opened in 1982. It has been managed by an independent trust since 1985.

A new wing was opened in June 2006, designed by Sir Colin Wilson and Long & Kentish. The £8.6 million project was funded by the Heritage Lottery Fund, Arts Council England, the local council, and other donors. The unashamedly modern block, which stands next to and integrates with the original Queen Anne building, won the 2007 Gulbenkian Prize; in the words of the judges, the juxtaposition creates "a vibrant relationship between old and new ... continued in a series of inspired contemporary installations" which are housed within. The extension was also listed for a 2007 RIBA award.

It is believed to be the first art gallery in the UK which is heated and cooled by a geothermal system, using water pumped through 69 pipes descending 35 metres under the building, connected to reversible heat pumps, which roughly halves its carbon emissions.

To the rear is a new courtyard garden, designed by Christopher Bradley-Hole, a Chelsea Flower Show gold medallist.
