= Spring House (Cambridge) =

House in Cambridge, UK

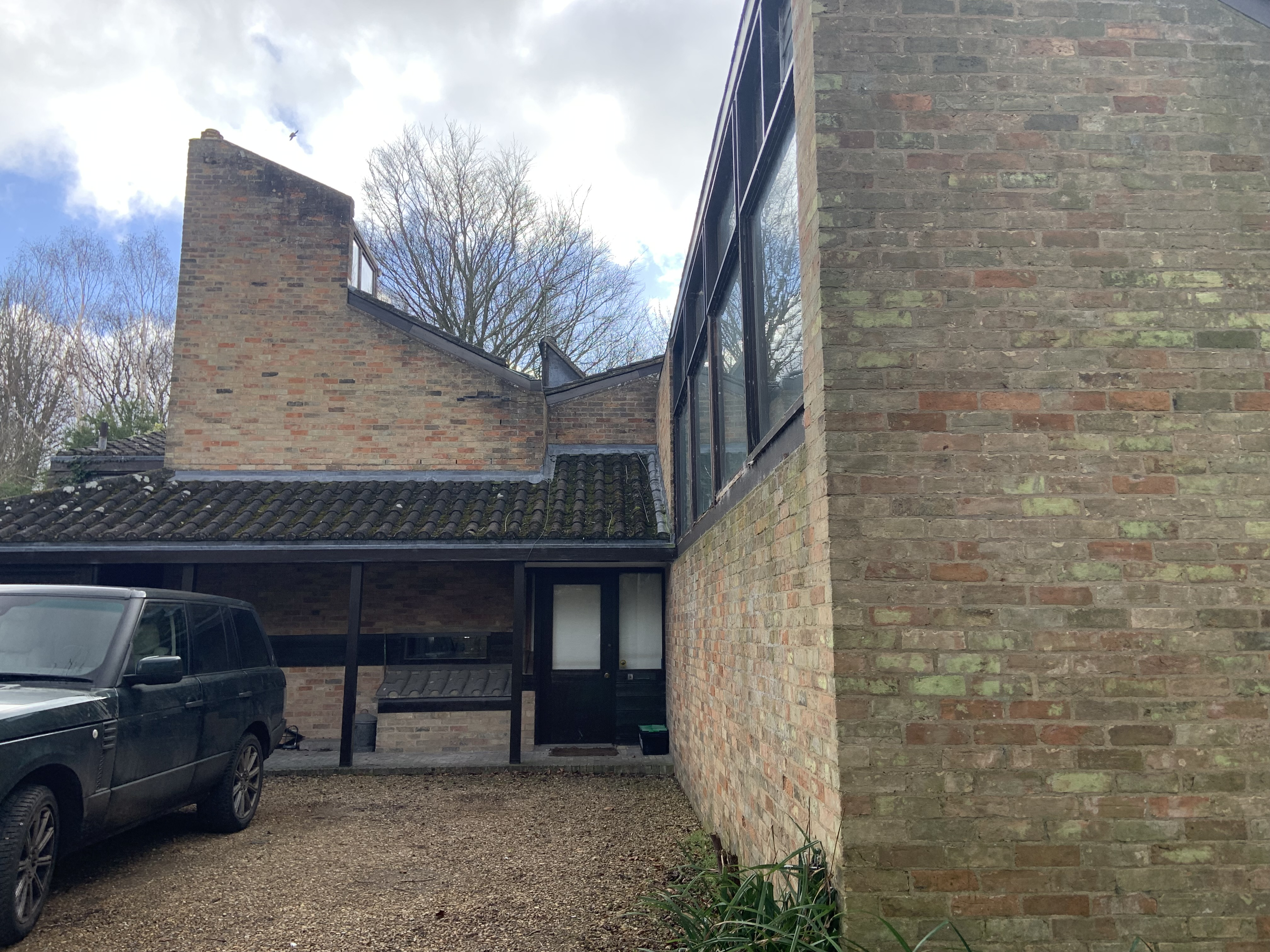
- Interactive map of Spring House
- 52°12′55″N 0°05′26″E
- Location: Cambridge

History
- Built: 1965

Site notes
- Architect(s): Colin St John Wilson, MJ Long
- Architectural style: Modernism

Listed Building – Grade II
- Designated: 2000
- Reference no.: 1380900

Spring House, also known as Cornford House, is a Grade II listed building in Cambridge, Cambridgeshire, England, designed by architects Colin St John Wilson and MJ Long. The house was commissioned by artist and writer Christopher Cornford and completed in 1965.

The house has been described as a transitional work that anticipated some of the architectural themes later featured in the British Library building in London.
