= Patrick Caulfield =

English painter (1936–2005)

- After Lunch, 1975, Tate Gallery
- Born: Patrick Joseph Caulfield; 29 January 1936; Acton, Middlesex, England
- Died: 29 September 2005 (aged 69); London, England
- Education: Chelsea School of Art, 1956–1959 Royal College of Art, 1960–1963
- Known for: Painting, Printmaking
- Notable work: After Lunch, 1975 Still Life with Dagger, 1963 Les Demoiselles d'Avignon vues de derrière, 1999
- Awards: Prix des Jeunes Artistes, 1965 Royal Academician, 1993 Jerwood Painting Prize, 1995 London Institute Honorary Fellowship, 1996 Commander of the Order of the British Empire, 1996

Still Life with Dagger, 1963, Tate Gallery

Patrick Joseph Caulfield, CBE, RA (29 January 1936 – 29 September 2005), was an English painter and printmaker known for his bold canvases, which often incorporated elements of photorealism within a pared-down scene. Examples of his work are Pottery and Still Life Ingredients.

== Early life ==
Patrick Joseph Caulfield was born on the 29th of January, 1936 at 17 All Saints Road, Acton, west London. During the second world war Caulfield's family returned to Bolton, where his parents had been born, and his father worked at the De Havilland factory. Leaving Acton Secondary Modern at the age of 15, Caulfield secured a position as a filing clerk at Crosse & Blackwell and later transferred to the design studio, working on food display and carrying out menial tasks. At 17, he joined the Royal Air Force at RAF Northwood, pre-empting requirement for national service. Inspired by the 1952 film Moulin Rouge about the artist Henri de Toulouse-Lautrec, he spent his free time attending evening classes at Harrow School of Art (now part of the University of Westminster).

== Studies and work ==
Patrick Caulfield studied at Chelsea School of Art from 1956 to 1960, and during this time he won two prizes which funded a trip he made to Greece and Crete upon graduation. The visit to the island proved important, with Caulfield finding inspiration in the Minoan frescoes and the bright, hard colours on Crete. One of his greatest friends was the abstract painter John Hoyland, whom he first met at the Young Contemporaries exhibition in 1959. Progressing to the Royal College of Art from 1960 to 1963, his contemporaries included David Hockney and Allen Jones. He taught at Chelsea School of Art from 1963 to 1971. In 1964, he exhibited at the New Generation show at London's Whitechapel Gallery, which resulted in him being associated with the pop art movement. This was a label Caulfield was opposed to throughout his career, seeing himself rather as "a 'formal' artist". He first exhibited with Leslie Waddington in 1969 and was represented by him for over thirty years, until Caulfield's death in 2005.

From the mid-1970s he incorporated more detailed, realistic elements into his work; After Lunch (1975) is an early example. Still-life: Autumn Fashion (1978) contains a variety of styles – some objects have heavy black outlines and flat colour, but a bowl of oysters is depicted more realistically and other areas are executed with looser brushwork. Caulfield later returned to his earlier, more stripped-down style of painting.

Caulfield's paintings are figurative, often portraying a few simple objects in an interior. Typically, he used flat areas of simple colour surrounded by black outlines. Some of his works are dominated by a single hue.

From the mid-1980s onward, Caulfield's work moved away from the heavy black outlines characteristic of his earlier paintings. As noted by Marco Livingstone, by 1987 "the long-favoured descriptive device of a black outline" had been eliminated altogether. Critics including William Feaver have described his later work as increasingly concerned with light and the construction of space; Feaver wrote that "tricks of the light became a prime resource in later years". Clarrie Wallis has compared these later interiors to those of Edward Hopper, noting their treatment of mood and detachment in everyday spaces. His final painting, Braque Curtain (2005), completed less than a fortnight before his death is in the collection of Tate. The work draws on imagery from Georges Braque's The Duet (1937), and Wallis has described it as a meditation on the transition from light to darkness within an enclosed interior.During this period, Caulfield was shortlisted for the Turner Prize in 1987, elected a Royal Academician in 1993, awarded the Jerwood Painting Prize in 1995, and appointed a Commander of the Order of the British Empire (CBE) in 1996.

In 1987, Caulfield was nominated for the Turner Prize for his show The Artist's Eye at the National Gallery in London. In 1996 he was made a CBE.

On 24 May 2004, a fire in a storage warehouse destroyed many works from the Saatchi collection, including three by Caulfield. In September 2010 Caulfield and five other British artists, Howard Hodgkin, John Walker, Ian Stephenson, John Hoyland, and R.B. Kitaj were included in an exhibition entitled The Independent Eye: Contemporary British Art From the Collection of Samuel and Gabrielle Lurie, at the Yale Center for British Art.

He died in London in 2005 and is buried in Highgate Cemetery. His work is held in the private collections of Charles Saatchi and David Bowie and the road on which he was born was renamed Caulfield Road after his death when the area was redeveloped.

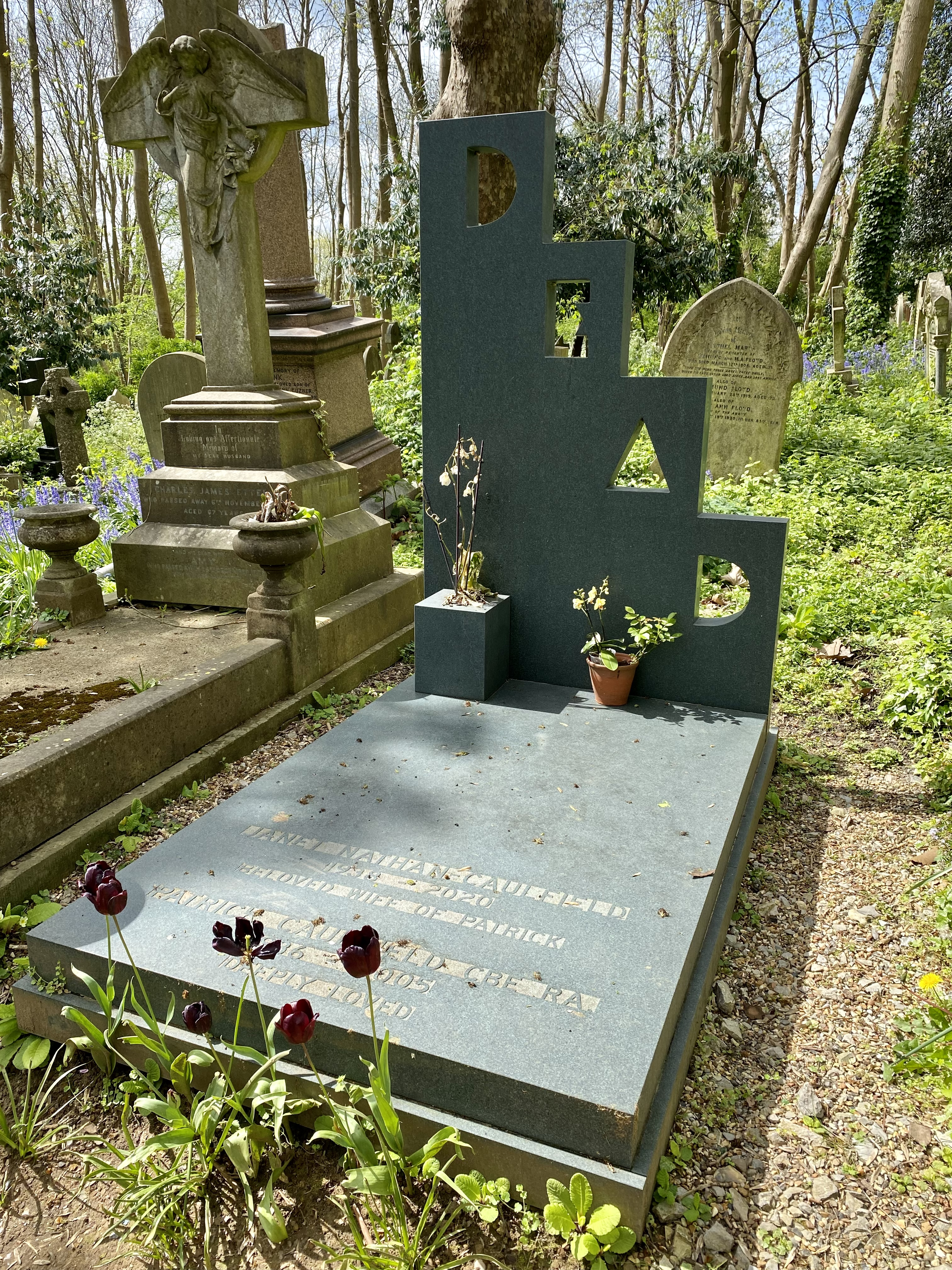
Patrick Caulfield's grave in Highgate Cemetery, with headstone simply stating "DEAD", designed by Caulfield himself

== Belsize Square Studio ==
In 1986, Caulfield moved to Belsize Square, where he lived and maintained a studio for the rest of his life.

== Commissions ==
Later in his career, Caulfield worked on several commissions in addition to his painting and printmaking. In 1990 he designed a stained glass window for The Ivy restaurant, it is visible from within the restaurant and on its exterior. In 1992 he designed a 12-metre carpet for the British Council's Manchester headquarters and in 1984 and 1995 set designs for Party Game and Rhapsody (respectively) at the Royal Opera House. Caulfield painted the doors of the Great West Organ at Portsmouth Cathedral in 2001.

== Selected solo exhibitions ==
- 2023 Pass The Peas, Josh Lilley Gallery London UK
- 2020 Alex Vardaxoglou, London, UK
- 2019 Patrick Caulfield: Morning, Noon and Night, Waddington Custot, London, UK
- 2013 Tate Britain, London, UK
- 2009 Patrick Caulfield: Between the Lines, Pallant House Gallery, Chichester, UK
- 2009 Prints 1964–1999, Alan Cristea Gallery, London, UK
- 2006 Royal Academy, London, UK (Special Summer Exhibition Show)
- 2006 Tate Liverpool, Liverpool, UK
- 1999 Hayward Gallery, London, UK
- 1996 Claudine Papillon, Paris, France
- 1992–93 Retrospective, Serpentine Gallery, London, UK
- 1989 Waddington Galleries, London, UK
- 1985 Waddington Galleries, London, UK
- 1982 Retrospective, Nishimura Gallery, Tokyo, Japan
- 1981 Patrick Caulfield: Paintings 1963–81, Walker Art Gallery, Liverpool, UK (touring to Tate Britain, London and Waddington Galleries, London, UK)
- 1978 Tate Gallery, London, UK
- 1968 Robert Elkon Gallery, New York, USA
- 1965 Robert Fraser Gallery, London, UK

== Selected public collections ==
UK

- Arts Council of Great Britain, London
- British Council, London & Manchester
- Manchester City Art Gallery, Manchester
- National Museum of Wales, Cardiff
- Scottish National Gallery of Modern Art, Edinburgh
- Tate Gallery, London
- Walker Art Gallery, Liverpool
- Whitworth Art Gallery, Manchester
- Victoria and Albert Museum, London

USA

- Dallas Museum of Art, Texas
- Harry N Abrams Collection, New York
- Virginia Museum of Fine Arts, Richmond

Australia

- National Gallery of Australia, Canberra
- Art Gallery of Western Australia, Perth
