= The Complete Opera Book =

Book by Gustav Kobbé

Dust jacket of the 1997 edition

The Complete Opera Book is a guide to operas by American music critic and author Gustav Kobbé first published (posthumously) in the United States in 1919 and the United Kingdom in 1922. A revised edition from 1954 by the Earl of Harewood is known as Kobbé's Complete Opera Book. The 1997 revision, edited by Harewood and Antony Peattie, is titled The New Kobbé's Opera Book.

== The original Complete Opera Book ==
Gustav Kobbé was on the point of completing the book which was afterwards published as The Complete Opera Book when he died. Various additions were made to it before publication, and also in subsequent editions or reprints, as the subject demands constant revision and renewal, both through new works and through the discovery or revival of lesser known existing ones. The work in its original form was first finally edited and brought together for publication by Katharine Wright, who at the same time included some additional operas in sections that bear her initials. Its full title was The Complete Opera Book : the Stories of the Operas, Together with 400 of the Leading Airs and Motives in Musical Notation. The early American editions were copyrighted in 1919 (first), and then in 1922 and 1924, by C. W. Kobbé.

Much of the additional material first appeared in a supplement or appendix to the main work. The last opera of the main text is the Goyescas of Enrique Granados, and the Supplement is still (in the English edition, p. 851 ff.) described as such in 1929, but in other editions called "Recent and Revised Operas." This continued to evolve, and incorporated additional material written by Ferruccio Bonavia (signed F.B.). The earlier supplement included works by Maeterlinck, Reginald de Koven, Ravel, Henry Hadley, Andre Messager, Holst, Rutland Boughton, Ethel Smyth, Rimsky-Korsakov, Mussorgsky and Stravinsky, and Mozart's Il Seraglio, occupying pp. 851–901. After 1929 it was enlarged to include Verdi's Simone Boccanegra, Boito's Nerone, Alban Berg's Wozzeck, Puccini's Turandot, Rossini's La Cenerentola, Mozart's Così fan tutte, Jaromir Weinberger's Schwanda the Bagpiper and Vaughan Williams's Hugh the Drover (pp. 901–930). The English 1935 imprint included Bonavia's notes on Rossini's L'Italiana in Algeri, Rimsky-Korsakov's Snegourochka and two operas of Ildebrando Pizzetti: parts of the former supplement had by now been incorporated into the main text, and the overall page-count before index was now 945 pages.

While no amount of enlargement could possibly have made the work literally complete, these additions supplied gaps in Kobbé's unfinished manuscript, some works of importance which appeared after his death, and others (such as Simone Boccanegra) which had important revivals.

The pre–World War II editions were enriched by a superb series of sixty-four photographs of singers in operatic roles. In general these did not change, though the frontispiece of Nellie Melba as Juliet was substituted by an engraved bust of Jenny Lind in other editions. The illustrations reflected exactly the singers of Kobbé's time, (including Winckelmann and Materna in the first Parsifal), and many of the famous international artists who sang at the Met from the 1890s to around 1920. They are typically the singers of the acoustic (i.e. pre electric-microphone) recording period c.1898-1925, so that the book remained popular with collectors of operatic 78 rpm records well after the real-life careers of these singers had been superseded by others. Hence in early editions the illustrations are listed in the sequence in which they appear, following the operas, but in later editions the illustrations table is alphabetical by singer.

== Kobbé's Complete Opera Book ==
The final (11th) impression (in fact variant editions) of the English edition was in September 1949. This constant revision reflected the fact that the book, with all its shortcomings, was the best encyclopedic account of operas from Gluck to Mascagni in existence. It was therefore this work which was chosen by the distinguished operatic patron the Earl of Harewood to form the basis of his complete new revision, retaining Kobbé's plan and a good deal of his text, but bringing the whole work up to date under the title of Kobbé's Complete Opera Book. Details of specific productions were supplied by Harold Rosenthal. The text was now arranged in three main sections. In Part 1, "Before 1800", sections on Monteverdi, Purcell, The Beggar's Opera and Pergolesi were added, Gluck was enlarged, and the Mozart operas systematized. The great body of Kobbé's work was maintained and enlarged in Part 2, "The Nineteenth Century" (beginning with Beethoven), preserved the original format of the various national "schools", with specific sections on Wagner and Verdi. Composers and synopses were similarly grouped by nationality in Part 3, "The Twentieth Century", treating the period 1900-1950 as a separate coherent whole, including an American section for Thomson, George Gershwin and Gian-Carlo Menotti, and a substantial English section culminating in Benjamin Britten. The illustrations were completely replaced with forty new photographs of post-War operatic productions and singers. Further reprints (with revisions) appeared in 1956 and 1958. The convention of noting authorship of different sections was retained by the initial "K" for Kobbé and "H" for Harewood. The resultant edition, while preserving and paying due homage to Kobbé's original work, was a newly authoritative work in its own right.
