= R. B. Kitaj =

American painter (1932–2007)

R. B. Kitaj RA
- Kitaj in 1998
- Born: Ronald Brooks; October 29, 1932; Chagrin Falls, Ohio, U.S.
- Died: October 21, 2007 (aged 74); Los Angeles, California, U.S.
- Education: Ruskin School of Drawing and Fine Art, Oxford Royal College of Art
- Known for: Painting, printmaking
- Awards: Royal Academician, 1991; Golden Lion, Venice Biennale, 1995

Ronald Brooks Kitaj RA (/kiːˈtaɪ/; October 29, 1932 – October 21, 2007) was an American artist who spent much of his life in England.

== Life ==
He was born in Chagrin Falls, Ohio, United States. His Hungarian father, Sigmund Benway, left his mother, Jeanne Brooks, shortly after he was born and they were divorced in 1934. His mother was the American-born daughter of Russian-Jewish immigrants. She worked in a steel mill and as a teacher. She remarried in 1941, to Dr Walter Kitaj, a Viennese refugee research chemist, and Ronald took his surname. His mother and stepfather were non-practicing Jews. He was educated at Troy High School (New York). He became a merchant seaman with a Norwegian freighter when he was 17 and travelled by boat to Havana and Mexico.

He studied at the Akademie der bildenden Künste in Vienna and the Cooper Union in New York City. After serving in the United States Army for two years, in France and Germany, he moved to England to study at the Ruskin School of Drawing and Fine Art in Oxford (1958–59) under the G.I. Bill, where he developed a love of Cézanne, and then at the Royal College of Art in London (1959–61), alongside David Hockney, Derek Boshier, Peter Phillips, Allen Jones and Patrick Caulfield. Richard Wollheim, the philosopher and David Hockney remained lifelong friends. He lived in California from 1967–68 and became friends with Robert Creeley and painter Jess Collins.

Kitaj married his first wife, Elsi Roessler, in 1953; they had a son, screenwriter Lem Dobbs, and adopted a daughter, Dominie. Elsi died by suicide in 1969. After living with Sandra Fisher for 12 years, he married her in December 1983 and they had one son, Max. Sandra Fisher died in 1994, at age 47, from acute disseminated encephalomyelitis (not an aneurysm, as is commonly written). Kitaj had a mild heart attack in 1990. He died in Los Angeles in October 2007, eight days before his 75th birthday. Seven weeks after Kitaj's death, the Los Angeles County coroner ruled that the cause of death was suicide by suffocation.

== Career ==
Kitaj settled in England, and through the 1960s taught at the Ealing Art College, the Camberwell School of Art and the Slade School of Art. He also taught at the University of California, Berkeley in 1968. He staged his first solo exhibition at Marlborough New London Gallery in London in 1963, entitled "Pictures with commentary, Pictures without commentary", in which text included in the pictures and the accompanying catalogue referred to a range of literature and history, citing Aby Warburg's analysis of symbolic forms as a major influence.

=== "School of London" ===
He curated an exhibition for the Arts Council at the Hayward Gallery in 1976, entitled "The Human Clay" (an allusion to W. H. Auden's lines 'To me Art's subject is the human clay, / And landscape but a background to a torso ... '), including works by 48 London artists, such as William Roberts, Richard Carline, Colin Self and Maggi Hambling, championing the cause of figurative art at a time when abstract was dominant. In an essay in the controversial catalogue, he invented the phrase the "School of London" to describe painters such as Frank Auerbach, Leon Kossoff, Francis Bacon, Lucian Freud, Euan Uglow, Michael Andrews, Reginald Gray, Peter de Francia and himself.

=== Style and influence ===
Kitaj had a significant influence on British pop art, with his figurative paintings featuring areas of bright colour, economic use of line and overlapping planes which made them resemble collages, but eschewing most abstraction and modernism. Allusions to political history, art, literature and Jewish identity often recur in his work, mixed together on one canvas to produce a collage effect. He also produced a number of screen-prints with printer Chris Prater. He told Tony Reichardt, manager of the Marlborough New London Gallery, that he made screen-prints as sketches for his future paintings. From then onwards Tony Reichardt commissioned Chris Prater to print three or four copies of every print he made on canvas. His later works became more personal.

Kitaj was recognised as being one of the world's leading draftsmen, almost on a par with, or compared to, Degas. Indeed, he was taught drawing at Oxford by Percy Horton, whom Kitaj claimed was a pupil of Walter Sickert, who was a pupil of Degas; and the teacher of Degas studied under Ingres. Meanwhile art historian Edgar Wind encouraged him to become a 'Warburgian artist'. His more complex compositions build on his line work using a montage practice, which he called 'agitational usage'. Kitaj often depicts disorienting landscapes and impossible 3D constructions, with exaggerated and pliable human forms. He often assumes a detached outsider point of view, in conflict with dominant historical narratives. This is best portrayed by one his best-known works, The Autumn of Central Paris (After Walter Benjamin) (1972–73).

Kitaj staged a major exhibition at Los Angeles County Museum of Art in 1965, and a retrospective at the Hirshhorn Museum in Washington, D.C. in 1981. He selected paintings for an exhibition, "The Artist's Eye", at the National Gallery, London in 1980. In 1981 he was elected into the National Academy of Design as an Associate member and became a full Academician in 1984.

=== Later years ===
In his later years, he developed a greater awareness of his Jewish heritage, which found expression in his works, with reference to the Holocaust and influences from Jewish writers such as Kafka and Walter Benjamin, and he came to consider himself to be a "wandering Jew". In 1989, Kitaj published First Diasporist Manifesto, a short book in which he analysed his own alienation, and how this contributed to his art. His book contained the remark: "The Diasporist lives and paints in two or more societies at once." And he added: "You don't have to be a Jew to be a Diasporist."

A second retrospective was staged at the Tate Gallery in 1994. Critical reviews in London were almost universally negative. British press savagely attacked the Tate exhibit, calling Kitaj a pretentious poseur who engaged in name dropping. Kitaj took the criticism very personally, declaring that "anti-intellectualism, anti-Americanism, and anti-Semitism" had fueled the vitriol. Despite the bad reviews, the exhibition moved to the Metropolitan Museum of Art in New York and afterwards to the Los Angeles County Museum of Art in 1995. His second wife, Sandra Fisher died from hyperacute haemorrhagic leuco-encephalitis in 1994, shortly after his exhibition at the Tate Gallery had ended. He blamed the British press for her death, stating that "they were aiming for me, but they got her instead." David Hockney concurred and said that he too believed the London art critics had killed Sandra Fisher. Kitaj returned to the US in 1997 and settled in Los Angeles, near his first son. "When my Wife died", he wrote to Edward Chaney, "London died for me and I returned home to California to live among sons and grandsons – It was a very good move and now I begin my 3rd and (last?) ACT! hands across The Sea." Three years later he wrote: "I grow older every day and rather like my hermit life." The "Tate War" and Sandra's death became a central themes for his later works: he often depicted himself and his deceased wife as angels. In Los Angeles No. 22 (Painting-Drawing) the beautiful young (and naked) girl records the shadow of her aged lover (on whose lap she sits) in a pose directly taken from the Scots Grand Tourist David Allan's Origin of Painting. The latter was included by Ernst Gombrich in his 1995 National Gallery exhibition (and catalogue) on Shadows so that Kitaj would have seen it two years before he left England for ever.

In 1997 Kitaj exhibited his work Sandra Three, an installation of paintings, photographs and text that stretched across an entire wall of the gallery at the Royal Academy's Summer Exhibition. Kitaj used the Academy's Summer Exhibition to showcase this sequence of works that dealt with the events of the "Tate War" and Sandra's death and even included a graffiti inscription stating 'The Critic Kills'.

In 2000, Kitaj was one of several artists to make a Post-it note for an internet charity auction held by 3M to celebrate the 20th anniversary of their product. The charcoal and pastel piece sold for $925, making it the most expensive post-it note in history, a fact recorded in the Guinness Book of World Records. Kitaj was elected to the Royal Academy in 1991, the first American to join the Academy since John Singer Sargent. He received the Golden Lion at the Venice Biennale in 1995. He staged another exhibition at the National Gallery in 2001, entitled "Kitaj in the Aura of Cézanne and Other Masters".

In 2007, Kitaj published his Second Diasporist Manifesto with Yale University Press and died one month later.

In September 2010, Kitaj and five British artists including Howard Hodgkin, John Walker, Ian Stephenson, Patrick Caulfield and John Hoyland were included in an exhibition entitled The Independent Eye: Contemporary British Art From the Collection of Samuel and Gabrielle Lurie, at the Yale Center for British Art.

In October 2012 a major international symposium was held in Berlin to mark what would have been Kitaj's 80th birthday. It accompanied Obsessions, the first comprehensive exhibition of Kitaj's work since his death, held at the Jewish Museum, Berlin. The title is partly in reference to what he dubbed his "erratic Jewish obsessions". The exhibition was shown in the UK in two parts at Pallant House Gallery, Chichester (February 23 to June 16, 2013) and the Jewish Museum London (February 21 to June 16, 2013).

All Too Human: Bacon, Freud and a Century of Painting Life opened at Tate Britain in February 2018, inspired by Kitaj's School of London.

== Sources ==
- Kitaj, R. B. (1989). First Diasporist Manifesto. Thames and Hudson. ISBN 0-500-27543-2.
- Kitaj, R. B. (2007). Second Diasporist Manifesto. A New Kind of Long Poem in 615 Free Verses. Yale University Press. ISBN 978-0-300-12456-9.
