= John Walker (painter) =

British and American artist

- Born: 1939 (age 86–87); Birmingham, England
- Education: Birmingham School of Art
- Known for: Painting, printmaking
- Spouse: Kayla Mohammadi
- Awards: Guggenheim Fellowship; John Moores Painting Prize; American Academy of Arts and Letters; National Academy of Design
- Website: John Walker

John Walker, Meder's Smoke, oil on canvas, 72" x 60", 2015.

John Walker (born 1939) is a British-born artist and educator based in the northeast United States. Over a career spanning sixty-plus years, he has received international recognition for a direct, expressive style of painting that merges abstraction, figuration, and diverse pictorial strategies and visual references. Walker typically paints in series distinguished by subject, shape, method or format. He drew critical attention in the 1960s and 1970s, becoming associated with post-war abstraction before developing a lexicon of forms and pattern motifs—their inspirations ranging from Aboriginal art to the costal landscape of Maine—that incorporated representational elements. Summarizing Walker's career, critic John Yau wrote, "Walker has always kept moving. He has never developed a signature motif or brand. [His] cross-pollination of direct observation, his dialogue with art history, autobiography, historical events, such as World War I, and abstraction is part of why he has never fit in. He invites the viewer into a world that is disconsolate, dissonant, elegiacal, haunted, inchoate and primordial … [His] art embodies the desire for artistic freedom in the face of mortality."

Walker has had solo exhibitions at the Museum of Modern Art (MoMA), Tate and the Hayward Gallery in London, the Venice Biennial, the Phillips Collection, Art Gallery of New South Wales, Kunstverein Hamburg, and Yuan Art Museum (Beijing). His work belongs to the collections of institutions including MoMA, Tate, the British Museum, National Gallery of Art, Whitney Museum, Metropolitan Museum of Art, National Gallery of Australia, Art Institute of Chicago, and Museum of Fine Arts, Boston.

Walker lives and works in South Bristol, Maine and is professor emeritus of art at Boston University. In 2025, an extensive monograph about his life and career, John Walker: Touch, was published.

== Early life and education ==
John Graham Walker was born in 1939 into a working class family in the industrial city of Birmingham, England, the third of four sons to John Henry Walker and May Stait Walker. He was admitted into the Birmingham School of Art at age 16 and graduated in 1960. Between 1960 and 1962 he extended his studies at the British School at Rome and Académie de la Grande Chaumière in Paris. Goya was a formative influence on his early work, which was figurative and personal; it often examined the difficult experiences of his parents—notably, his father's World War I trauma—through anguished figures, pointed text and scrawled graphics.

== Work and reception ==
Critics, including William Corbett and John Yau, frequently identify an uncompromising strain in Walker's painting that rejects decorum, easy cognition and the picturesque, characterizing his work as "tough," "blunt," "brutal" or "jarring". They note that rather than synthesize wide-ranging inspirations into a seamless style, he maintains the disjuncture between them. Among the referents enumerated in his work are the currents of places he has lived—England, the U.S. and Australia—and themes and devices from European masters like Rembrandt, Velázquez, Goya and Manet, early modernists such as Cézanne, Matisse and the Cubists, Aboriginal and African art, and American abstract expressionism.

Writers attribute the artist's embrace of complexity to his simultaneous commitments to abstraction, direct observation, the materiality of the painted surface, mark-making and emotional expression. Together, these concerns produce hard-to-reconcile elements in his paintings: paradoxical pictorial devices and spatial registers and different kinds of paint handling and facture, among them. Art historian Alex Bacon observes that Walker's painting—in a reversal of the development of early modernism—pushed out instead from abstraction to the edge of figuration, with legible forms that resisted identification or anthropomorphism; in later work, these forms often co-exist alongside recognizable imagery and loosely geometric shapes and patterns, creating a persistent ambiguity regarding abstraction and representation. Jack Flam identified a related tension between the thick physicality of the surfaces and their ability to evoke space and imaginary objects, which allows them to function as both things unto themselves and arenas for reality.

=== Early abstraction, 1965–78 ===
By 1965 Walker had shifted to abstraction, attaining international recognition over the next decade through prominent exhibitions, prizes and critical notice. His first mature series included the painting Study for Anguish (1964–65), a gridded surface of squares filled with a loose hatch of sprayed marks, onto which he painted a form based upon a piece of folded cardboard—a forerunner to his later "Alba" motif. It won the John Moores Painting Prize for artist under 35 in 1965. After being appointed a Gregory Fellow in painting at the University of Leeds (1967), he received a Harkness Fellowship to work in the U.S and a Theodoron Award from the Guggenheim Museum in 1969.

John Walker, Hannah's Blue, mixed media, acrylic and collage on canvas, 120" x 95", 1976, Hood Museum of Art, Dartmouth College.

In subsequent work, Walker turned to immersive (up to 22-foot-long) shaped canvases In which color, geometric shapes and varied application methods (e.g., forcing paint through a metal grill) played a greater role. His exhibition at Hayward Gallery (1968) featured long, low-hung, trapezoid canvases that produced a temporal and spatial experience similar to the embodied modalities of contemporary sculpture. Critics such as Dore Ashton emphasized Walker's use of shape—both as structure and painted forms—which brought elements of surrealism and ancient echoes to abstraction. She wrote that works such as Remembrance (1971) "successfully accommodated allusiveness while giving full reign to Walker's novel, almost narrative, interaction of forms without compromising their richly tactile, abstract character."

In the 1970s, Walker returned to rectilinear formats, while emphasizing ambiguous geometry and architectonic form, jostling types of pictorial space and facture, surface and—in the "Numinous" series (1977)—recognizable imagery. After representing England at the 1972 Venice Biennial, he sought a different approach and worked directly on gallery walls, creating large, heavily worked chalk-dust pieces that existed only for the duration of an exhibition. Titled Blackboards (1972–74), the delicate, site-specific works were exhibited at Ikon Gallery, Nigel Greenwood Gallery, Kunstverein Hamburg and MoMA. Critic Caroline Tisdall noted the work's directness and balancing of striking shapes with "lively, responsive and animated surface." Walker's Juggernauts series (1973–77) pushed the physicality of his surfaces further, combining jagged, cut and collage pieces of painted canvas and Russian suprematist forms in works that critic John Russell called "sculptural" (e.g., Hannah's Blue, 1976). In 1976, Juggernaut with Plume for P. Neruda (1974–76) won the biennial John Moore Painting Prize for best contemporary painting.

=== "Alba" and "Oceania" series, 1979–89 ===
By 1979 Walker was painting tangible, but unidentifiable, quasi-figural forms set in increasingly theatrical abstract spaces. Created through the 1980s, these works are collectively labeled his "Alba" paintings, denoting a repeated, vertical shape—a variation on his 1965 Anguish form—that loosely references Goya's cinch-waisted depictions of a female subject. Critic Paul Brach described the Alba form as a "notched monolith" cast as the artist's subject and capable of encompassing themes involving gender, the human and inanimate, and the spiritual and mundane; for Walker, the figural form restored a sense of space and depth in his painting that had been flattened by the collaged works. Critics have noted how the artist's use of impasto and chiaroscuro surfaces re-emphasizing the picture plane counter the form's tendencies toward narrative and symbolism.

John Walker, Rejection, oil on canvas, 84" x 66", 1986–96.

After Walker moved to Australia in the early 1980s, he encountered the influence of Oceanic art and Aboriginal bark painting, as well as the local landscape. In the "Oceania" series , Alba paintings took on a brighter, more airy quality, and like Aboriginal art, combined naturalistic or schematic depictions of objects (often beads or vessels) alongside characteristic motifs and abstract elements, raising epistemological questions and issues of pictorial representation. In an exhibition (Hayward Gallery, 1985) review, Tony Godfrey called the work "a site of struggle … a drama of psychological states that are uncertain and not easily expressed … like being surrounded by the presences of a primeval forest endlessly talking to one another."

=== World War I works, 1993–00 ===
In the 1990s, Walker continued to explore the materiality of paint and reinventions of personal iconography, while introducing markedly new subjects in his "World War I" works, including biography, poetry and text, and history, both familial and global. Presented initially in the six-venue traveling exhibition, "A Theater of Recollection" (1997–99), these paintings and prints took as a point of departure his late father's experiences serving at the front in the British army; their visceral quality and themes of historical trauma, loss and grief brought Walker's work into dialogue with that of Philip Guston (e.g., Rejection, 1986–96). In multileveled, thickly painted canvases such as The Somme (July 1, 1916) or Passchendaele II, he combined a rush of imagery: Aboriginal elements, cruciforms, rivers of mud, fields of cursive text (fragments of poems by World War I soldiers/writers Wilfred Owen and David Jones), and a recurrent, solitary soldier with a bare sheep skull for a head—a stand-in for Walker's father—that referenced the notion of sheep sent to slaughter. Reviewers deemed the series "sobering and vivid" work striking "a note of elegy and not-so-muted horror."

=== Landscape-inspired paintings, 2001–present ===
The year 2001 signaled another shift in direction as Walker sought to capture the essence of a rugged New England cove near his home, an effort that would occupy him over the next two-plus decades. Unlike other painters of Maine, however, he was drawn downwards to where dark mud mixed with detritus stirred up and caught by tides. Largely abstract and expressionistic, the landscapes are characterized by their freewheeling rearrangements of visual cues, gritty, near-sculptural surfaces (often textured with cove mud, sand and pine needles), and movement between spontaneity and careful composition. According to curator Christopher Crosman, rather than depictions of landscape, the paintings "are meditations on the ineffable qualities of a place as Walker has experienced it—color, light, motion, shape, texture"— recording his feeling across seasons, months and years. John Yau likens them to the visionary work of Marsden Hartley, for whom the coast was a springboard to metaphysical speculation.

Walker presented the landscapes in exhibitions between 2001 and 2004, at Knoedler & Co., Nielsen Gallery and The Phillips Collection, among others. Described as "messy, brawny and exultant," these canvases were painted in somber earth tones and stormy grays pierced by brilliant jewel tones. They typically featured a horizon line under a narrow ribbon of sky near the top, with a large expanse of earth below containing enigmatic biomorphic shapes. including flat, vertical, violin-shaped gulley forms dropped from the horizon. Critic Grace Glueck observed that the textured, individual elements had "an abstract force to them, yet the whole is a readable landscape."

With the "Seal Point" series (2005–23), Walker enacted a dramatic shift in scale, painting the cove on old, 5.5" x 7.25" bingo cards that he found in the grange hall that became his studio. The compact oils (eventually numbering over 200) have been noted for their range of painterly technique, expressivity, and incisive glimpses of shifting season, weather, time, sky and topography, which merge with faint traces of the cards' printed numbers and grids. Dore Ashton described them as functioning on multiple levels: "these are landscapes with a stunning range of emotional tone, but they are also abstractions, to the highest degree, of Walker's experiences, not only before the motif, but of his generously endowed imagination."

The large canvases Walker exhibited from 2014 to 2018 retained the primordial aspects of earlier work, while introducing an element of jagged dissonance. These paintings embrace both observational evidence and visual signs, forming what critic Thomas Micchelli called, slow-to-disclose, "vertically tilted, crazily Cubistic landscapes." In works such as John Constable's Tree (2014), Walker invoked master landscapists as well as geometric abstractionists like Malevich and Mondrian, juxtaposing figural forms and bright ideogrammatic arrangements. Others such as Meder's Smoke or Bait I (both 2015), featured aggressively brushed, zigzagging horizontal and vertical stripes in Veronese greens and deep blues, punctuated by interlocking and overlapping shapes that suggested fronds, shields or puzzle pieces.

Walker's late paintings bring together his influences of the past sixty years and recall Matisse’s late collages in their airiness and effect of fragmentation and union. Largely abstract, the often cobalt-blue and white works feature short vertical or horizontal strokes and schematic shapes vaguely suggesting dock pieces, fishery gear and beads (Resurrection III, 2022). Amy Rahn of The Brooklyn Rail commented, "Walker's painting collages Maine's vernacular and art's history into, emphatically, new work, which survives and transforms its referents."

== Collections and recognition ==
Walker's work belongs to the public collections of institutions including the Art Gallery of New South Wales, Art Institute of Chicago, The British Council, The British Museum, Cleveland Museum of Art, Dallas Museum of Art, Harvard University Art Museums, Hirshhorn Museum, Imperial War Museum, Irish Museum of Modern Art, Iziko South African National Gallery (South Africa), Leeds Museums & Galleries, Metropolitan Museum of Art, MIT List Visual Arts Center, Museum of Contemporary Art, Chicago, Museum of Contemporary Art, Los Angeles, Museum of Contemporary Art, San Diego, Museum of Fine Arts Budapest, Museum of Fine Arts, Boston, Museum of Fine Arts, Houston, Museum Liaunig (Austria), Museum of Modern Art, National Gallery of Art, National Gallery of Australia, National Galleries Scotland, National Gallery of Victoria, The Phillips Collection, Portland Museum of Art, Seattle Art Museum, Solomon R. Guggenheim Museum, Tate, Ulster Museum, Victoria and Albert Museum, Virginia Museum of Fine Arts, Walker Art Gallery, Whitney Museum, and Yale Center for British Art, among others.

In the first half of his career, Walker received awards in Britain and the U.S. including the John Moores Painting Prize, Guggenheim Fellowship, Harkness Fellowship and Guggenheim Museum Theodoron Award, as well as a Turner Prize nomination. In the 2000s, he has been recognized with an Academy of Design painting prize, an American Academy of Arts and Letters award in art, and election to the National Academy of Design, among other honors. Walker has been an artist-in-residence at several institutions throughout his career, including the University of Leeds, Oxford University and National Art School in Sydney.

== Teaching ==
After moving to the U.S., Walker served as a professor of painting and head of the graduate painting program at Boston University from 1992 until his retirement in 2015 as professor emeritus. Prior to that, he was dean of Victorian College of the Arts at the University of Melbourne from 1982 to 1986. In the 1970s he taught at the Royal College of Art in London and was a visiting professor at Yale University. He began his teaching career at Stourbridge College of Art and Birmingham College of Art in England in the 1960s.
