= List of officers of the Royal Academy of Arts =

== Officers of the Royal Academy of Arts ==
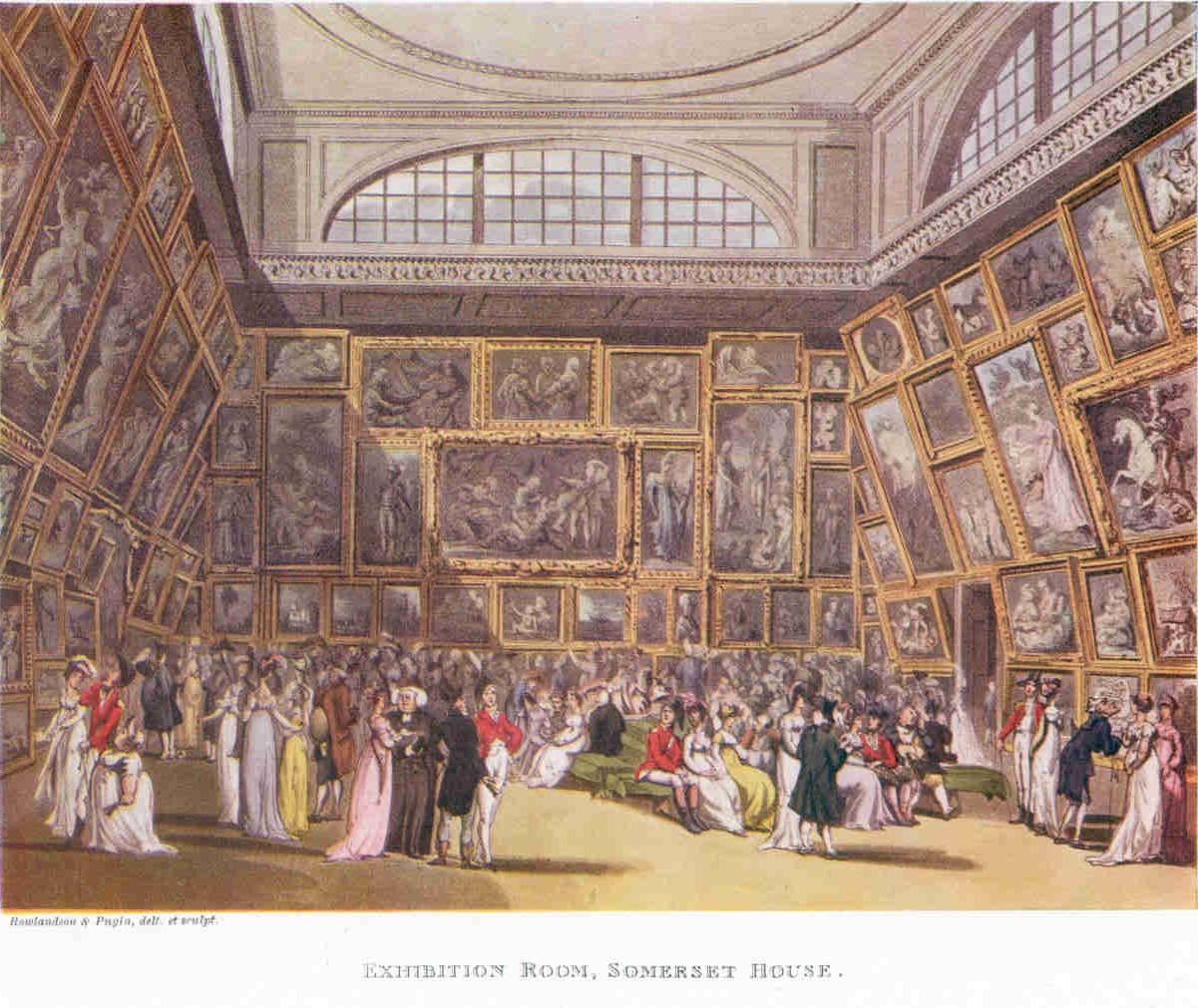
An early Summer Exhibition at the Academy's original home in Somerset House.

This is a list of the officers of the Royal Academy of Arts.

=== Presidents (PRA) ===
President	Served
Joshua Reynolds	1768–1792
Benjamin West	1792–1805
James Wyatt	1805–1806
Benjamin West	1806–1820
Thomas Lawrence	1820–1830
Martin Archer Shee	1830–1850
Charles Lock Eastlake	1850–1865
Francis Grant	1866–1878
Lord Leighton	1878–1896
John Everett Millais	February–August 1896
Edward Poynter	1896–1918
Aston Webb	1919–1924
Frank Dicksee	1924–1928
William Llewellyn	1928–1938
Edwin Lutyens	1938–1944
Alfred Munnings	1944–1949
Gerald Kelly	1949–1954
Albert Richardson	1954–1956
Charles Wheeler	1956–1966
Thomas Monnington	1966–1976
Hugh Casson	1976–1984
Roger de Grey	1984–1993
Philip Dowson	1993–1999
Phillip King	1999–2004
Nicholas Grimshaw	2004–2011
Christopher Le Brun	2011–2019
Rebecca Salter	2019–present

=== Keepers ===
Keeper	Served
George Michael Moser	10 Dec 1768 – 24 Jan 1783
Agostino Carlini	3 Mar 1783 – 24 Sep 1790
Joseph Wilton	24 Sep 1790 – 25 Nov 1803
Henry Fuseli	24 Dec 1804 – 16 Apr 1825
Henry Thomson	9 Jun 1825 – 10 Dec 1827
William Hilton	10 Dec 1827 – 30 Dec 1839
George Jones	3 Mar 1840 – 31 Dec 1850
Charles Landseer	29 Mar 1851 – 6 May 1873
Frederick Richard Pickersgill	10 Jul 1873 – 3 Aug 1887
Philip Hermogenes Calderon	3 Aug 1887 – 30 Apr 1898
Ernest Crofts	29 Sep 1898 – 19 Mar 1911
Andrew Carrick Gow	8 Dec 1911 – 1 Feb 1920
Charles Sims	18 Mar 1920 – 8 Nov 1926
Walter Westley Russell	1 Oct 1927 – 31 Dec 1942
Gerald Kelly	19 Jan 1943 – 11 Dec 1945
Philip Connard	11 Dec 1945 – 31 Dec 1949
Henry Rushbury	22 Apr 1949 – 30 Jun 1964
Peter Greenham	30 Jun 1964 – 30 Sep 1985
Edward Middleditch	1 Oct 1985 – 30 Sep 1986
Norman Adams	1 Oct 1986 – 30 Sep 1995
Leonard McComb	1 Oct 1995 – 21 May 1998
Brendan Neiland	21 May 1998 – 28 Jul 2004
Maurice Cockrill	28 Oct 2004 – 1 Oct 2011
Eileen Cooper	1 Oct 2011 – 31 Aug 2017
Rebecca Salter	1 Sep 2017 – 4 May 2020
Cathie Pilkington	5 May 2020 – present

=== Treasurers ===
Treasurer	Served
William Chambers	10 Dec 1768 – 8 Mar 1796
John Yenn	2 Apr 1796 – 8 Jun 1820
Robert Smirke	8 Jun 1820 – 18 Jul 1850
Philip Hardwick	18 Jul 1850 – 25 Mar 1861
Sydney Smirke	25 Mar 1861 – 26 Feb 1874
Edward Middleton Barry	26 Feb 1874 – 27 Jan 1880
George Edmund Street	19 Nov 1880 – 18 Dec 1881
Richard Norman Shaw	8 Mar 1882 – 28 Mar 1882
John Callcott Horsley	14 Jun 1882 – 17 Nov 1897
Alfred Waterhouse	17 Nov 1897 – 5 Dec 1901
Thomas Graham Jackson	5 Dec 1901 – 8 May 1912
Aston Webb	8 May 1912 – 25 Apr 1919
Frank Short	25 Apr 1919 – 5 Dec 1932
Sydney Lee	5 Dec 1932 – 5 Dec 1940
Edwin Cooper	5 Dec 1940 – 24 Jun 1942
E. Vincent Harris	3 Dec 1942 – 7 Dec 1954
Edward Maufe	7 Dec 1954 – 10 Dec 1958
Louis de Soissons	10 Dec 1958 – 23 Sep 1962
Basil Spence	11 Dec 1962 – 31 Oct 1964
James Gunn	8 Dec 1964 – 30 Dec 1964
Donald McMorran	20 Jan 1965 – 6 Aug 1965
Marshall Sisson	7 Dec 1965 – 8 Dec 1970
William Holford	8 Dec 1970 – 20 Oct 1975
Hugh Casson	9 Dec 1975 – 29 Apr 1976
Roger de Grey	29 Apr 1976 – 31 Dec 1984
Philip Powell	1 Jan 1985 – 30 Sep 1995
Michael Kenny	1 Oct 1995 – 28 Dec 1999
Paul Huxley	30 Mar 2000 – 31 Aug 2014
Chris Orr	12 Mar 2014 – 19 Mar 2018
Chris Wilkinson	19 Mar 2018 – 31 October 2020
Peter St John	1 November 2020 – present

=== Secretary & Chief Executive ===
Secretary	Served	Ref.
Francis Milner Newton	10 Dec 1768 – 10 Dec 1788	
John Inigo Richards	10 Dec 1788 – 2 Mar 1810	
Henry Howard	11 Feb 1811 – 20 Jan 1847	
John Prescott Knight	23 Nov 1847 – 10 Jul 1873	
Frederick A. Eaton	10 Jul 1873 – 10 Sep 1913	
Walter Lamb	2 Dec 1913 – 31 Dec 1951	
Humphrey Brooke	1 Jan 1952 – 12 Jul 1968	
Sidney C. Hutchison	1 Oct 1968 – 31 Mar 1982	
Piers Rodgers	1 Apr 1982 – 30 Sep 1996	
David Gordon	1 Oct 1996 – 31 Jul 2002	
Lawton Fitt	21 Oct 2002 – 24 Mar 2005	
MaryAnne Stevens	1 Apr 2005 – 1 Sep 2007	
Charles Saumarez Smith	1 Sep 2007 – December 2018	
Axel Rüger	June 2019 – 31 October 2024	
Natasha Mitchell	1 November 2024 – present	

== Honorary officers of the Royal Academy of Arts ==
=== Honorary Academician Extraordinary ===
Honorary Academician Extraordinary	Elected	Notes	Ref.
Winston Churchill	1948 – 1965		

=== Honorary Fellows ===
Honorary Fellow	Elected	Notes	Ref.
David Attenborough	10 December 1992		
Edward Fox	9 December 1993		
Alan Bennett	18 May 2000		
Pierre Rosenberg	18 May 2000		
Quentin Blake	24 May 2001		
Alfred Brendel	2009		
A. S. Byatt	2009		
Richard Cork	2011		
Joseph Rykwert	2011		
John Tusa	2011		
Jeanette Winterson	2011		
Svetlana Alpers	2014		
Nicholas Hytner	2014		
Peregrine Cavendish, 12th Duke of Devonshire	9 March 2016		
Agnes Gund	9 March 2016		
Marina Warner	19 March 2018		
Tim Berners-Lee	10 December 2019		
Zadie Smith	11 September 2020		
Sarah Gilbert	14 December 2021		
Hisham Matar	14 December 2021		
Ngaire Woods	2022		

=== Honorary Members ===
Honorary Member	Position	Elected	Ref.
James Fenton	Antiquarian of the Royal Academy	2002 – present	
Sidney C. Hutchison	Antiquarian of the Royal Academy	1992 – 2000	
Lucy Winkett	Chaplain	2010 – present	
John Boardman	Professor of Ancient History	1989 – present	
Mary Beard	Professor of Ancient Literature	2013 – present	
Charles Saumarez Smith	Professor of Architectural History	1 September 2019 – 31 August 2023	
Dawn Adès	Professor of History of Art	2008 – present	
Alan Moses	Professor of Law	2006 – present	
Peter Ricketts	Secretary of Foreign Correspondence	2018 – present	
Simon Robertson	Honorary Corresponding Member	2008 – present	
Scott Mead	Honorary Corresponding Member	2019 – present	

=== Honorary Members ex officio ===
An incomplete list of the ex officio members, by virtue of their holding of another office.

Honorary Member	ex officio	Elected	Preferred media	Notes	Ref.
Dermod O'Brien	President of the Royal Hibernian Academy	1911 – 1945	Painting		
Joyce W. Cairns	President of the Royal Scottish Academy	2018 – present			
Derek Balmer	President of the Royal West of England Academy	2003 – 2010			

=== Honorary Archivists ===
Honorary Archivist	Elected	Notes	Ref.
Sidney C. Hutchison	1982 – 2000		

=== Honorary Curators ===
Honorary Curator	Elected	Notes	Ref.
Stephen Farthing	1999 – present		
Donald Hamilton Fraser	1992 – 1999		
Lawrence Gowing	1985 – 1991		

=== Honorary Curators of Architecture ===
Honorary Curator	Elected	Notes	Ref.
Adrian Forty			

=== Honorary Curators of Prints and Drawings ===
Honorary Curator of Prints and Drawings	Elected	Notes	Ref.
Andrew Wilton	2003 – present		

=== Honorary Surveyors ===
Honorary Surveyor	Elected	Notes	Ref.
Roger Zogolovitch	2015 – present		

== Other posts ==
=== Professors of the Royal Academy Schools ===
Professor of Painting	Served	Notes	Ref.
Lubaina Himid	2020 – present		
Mali Morris	2019 – 2020		
Chantal Joffe	2015 – 2019		
Fiona Rae	2011 – 2015		

Professor of Chemistry	Served	Notes	Ref.
Bronwyn Ormsby	2019 – present		

Eranda Professor of Drawing	Served	Notes	Ref.
Alison Wilding	1 October 2018 – present		
David Remfry	2016 – 19 March 2018		
Michael Landy	2014 – 2016		
Tracey Emin	2011 – 2013		
Ian McKeever	2006 – 2011		
Gary Hume	2004 – 2006		
Peter Blake	2002 – 2004		
Christopher Le Brun	2000 – 2002		

The post was created in 2000, supported by the Eranda Rothschild Foundation.

Professor of Perspective	Served	Notes	Ref.
Fiona Banner	2020 – present		
Humphrey Ocean	2012 – 2020		
J. M. W. Turner	1807 – 1837		

Professor of Printmaking	Served	Notes	Ref.
Norman Ackroyd	1999 – 2000		

Professor of Sculpture	Served	Notes	Ref.
Mike Nelson	2019 – present		
Cathie Pilkington	2015 – 2019		
Richard Wilson	2011 – 2015		
David Mach	2000 – 2007		
Bryan Kneale	1985 – 1989	Master of the Sculpture School 1982 – 1985	

=== Residents ===
Poet-in-Residence	Served
Pele Cox	2 Sep 2011 – 2012

== See also ==
- List of Royal Academicians
