= Shutov =

Shutov (Russian: Шутов) is a Russian masculine surname, its feminine counterpart is Shutova. It may refer to

- Lyubov Shutova (born 1983), Russian fencer
- Oleksandr Shutov (born 1975), Ukrainian football player
- Sergei Shutov (born 1955), Russian artist
  - The Shutov Assembly, an album by British musician Brian Eno dedicated to Sergei Shutov
- Stepan Shutov (1902–1963), Soviet military officer
- Vladimir Shutov (born 1971), Russian football player
- Yury Shutov (1946–2014), Russian politician
