= Fitt =

Fitt is a surname. Notable people with the surname include:

- Alfred B. Fitt (1923–1992), United States lawyer
- Gerry Fitt (1926–2005), politician in Northern Ireland
- Lawton Fitt (born 1953), American banker
- Matthew Fitt, Lowland Scots/Lallans poet and novelist
