= Elizabeth Prettejohn =

American art historian

Elizabeth Francesca Prettejohn (born 15 May 1961) is an art historian and author of several books about art history. Her books have included Rossetti and his Circle (1997), The Art of the Pre-Raphaelites (2000) and Art for Art's Sake (2007). She has also co-edited and co-authored several publications. She has written exhibition catalogues and papers for journals such as The Burlington Magazine, Journal of Victorian Culture and Art Bulletin.

== Education and career ==
Prettejohn was the professor of the history of art at the University of Bristol from 2005, before becoming head of the history of art at the University of York in 2012. She had also been the Professor of Modern Art at the University of Plymouth and (briefly) the curator of Paintings and Sculpture at Birmingham Museum and Art Gallery. She studied at Harvard University, where she got her Bachelor of Arts degree (summa cum laude), and at the Courtauld Institute of Art, where she got her Master of Arts degree in 1987 and PhD degree in 1991. She is married to the Professor of Classics and Dean of Arts, Charles Martindale.

== Publications ==
=== Books ===
Name	Year	Publisher	Notes
Modern painters, old masters : the art of imitation from the Pre-Raphaelites to the First World War	2017	Yale University Press	
The Modernity of Ancient Sculpture: Greek Sculpture and Modern Art from Winckelmann to Picasso	2012	I. B. Tauris	
Art for Art's Sake: Aestheticism in Victorian Painting	2007	Yale University Press	Won the 2008 Historians of British Art Prize for single-authored book on a subject from the period after 1800
Beauty and Art 1750–2000	2005	Oxford University Press	Part of the Oxford History of Art series
The Art of the Pre-Raphaelites	2000	Tate Publishing and Princeton University Press	
Interpreting Sargent	1998	Tate Publishing	
Rossetti and his Circle	1997	Tate Publishing	
After the Pre-Raphaelites: Art and Aestheticism in Victorian England	1999	Manchester University Press and Rutgers University Press	Editor
Frederic Leighton: Antiquity, Renaissance, Modernity	1999	Yale University Press	Edited with Tim Barringer

=== Curated exhibitions ===
Name	Time	Locations	Notes
J.W. Waterhouse: The Modern Pre-Raphaelite (in Europe); J.W. Waterhouse: Garden of Enchantment (in Canada)	2008–2010	Groninger Museum Groningen, Royal Academy of Arts London and Museum of Fine Arts Montreal	With Peter Trippi, Robert Upstone and MaryAnne Stevens.
Dante Gabriel Rossetti	2003–04	Walker Art Gallery and Van Gogh Museum	With Julian Treuherz and Edwin Becker
Adrian Stokes	2002 June	Arnolfini	With Edwin Becker and others
Sir Lawrence Alma-Tadema	1996–97	Walker Art Gallery and Van Gogh Museum	With Edwin Becker and others
Imagining Rome: British Artists and Rome in the Nineteenth Century	1996–97	Bristol City Museum and Art Gallery	With Michael Liversidge
Characters and Conversations: British Art 1900–1930	1996–97	Tate Gallery Liverpool	With Fiona Bradley
Impressionism for England: Samuel Courtauld as Patron and Collector	1994	Courtauld Institute Galleries	Researcher
