= Wrong Way Up =

Studio album by Brian Eno and John Cale
- Released: 5 October 1990
- Recorded: April – July 1990
- Studios: Brian Eno's Wilderness Studio, Woodbridge, Suffolk, UK
- Genre: Art rock
- Length: 41:30
- Labels: Opal/Warner Bros. All Saints/Hannibal (2005)
- Producers: Brian Eno, John Cale

Brian Eno chronology
Textures (1989)	Wrong Way Up (1990)	Nerve Net (1992)

John Cale chronology
Songs for Drella (1990)	Wrong Way Up (1990)	Paris s'eveille - suivi d'autres compositions (1991)

Singles from Wrong Way Up
- 1. "One Word" Released: October 1990; 2. "Spinning Away" Released: 1990

Wrong Way Up is the sole collaborative studio album by Brian Eno and John Cale, originally released on October 5, 1990, on Opal and Warner Bros. Records. The album sits between the electronic, prog-rock and art rock genres and features some of both Eno and Cale's most mainstream work.

The 2005 re-release on All Saints Records was remastered and had a different cover, but reverted to the original in 2020. It contains two bonus tracks, "Grandfather's House" and ″You Don't Miss Your Water″ by Eno. Both titles only appeared on single or EP before; the latter was taken from the 1988 OST album Married to the Mob.

The album was acclaimed upon release by critics, whilst it is recognized by some for the single "Spinning Away", which was notably covered by the American rock band Sugar Ray.

== Reception ==
Professional ratings
Review scores
Source	Rating
AllMusic	4.5/5 stars
Chicago Tribune	3/4 stars
Entertainment Weekly	A−
The Guardian	3/5 stars
Mojo	4/5 stars
NME	7/10
Pitchfork	8.7/10
Q	4/5 stars
Rolling Stone	4/5 stars
The Village Voice	A−

Trouser Press praised the album, calling it "an absolutely wonderful pop record, a subversion of Top 40 formulae to the pair's own idiosyncratic (but utterly accessible) ends." In a retrospective review, Pitchfork called it "an album of contention, contrasts, cycles, and pop songs so layered and euphoric it ranks among the best albums either artist has ever made."

== Track listing ==
All tracks written by John Cale and Brian Eno; except where indicated.

=== Original 1990 release ===
Side A

1. "Lay My Love" – 4:44
2. "One Word" – 4:34
3. "In the Backroom" – 4:02
4. "Empty Frame" – 4:26
5. "Cordoba" – 4:22

Side B

6. "Spinning Away" – 5:27
7. "Footsteps" – 3:13
8. "Been There, Done That" – 2:52
9. "Crime in the Desert" – 3:42
10. "The River" (Brian Eno) – 4:23

=== Bonus tracks on 2005 remaster ===
UK & rest of the world

"Grandfather's House" (John Cale)
1. "You Don't Miss Your Water" (William Bell)

US

"You Don't Miss Your Water" (William Bell)
1. "Palanquin" (John Cale)

=== Singles ===
"Been There, Done That" b/w ?, 1990 US ?
"Spinning Away" b/w "Grandfather's House", 1990 German 7"
"Spinning Away (edit)" b/w "Grandfather's House" / "Palanquin", 1990 German 12" & CD-single
"One Word" b/w "Grandfather's House" / "Palanquin", 1990 UK 12" & CD-single
"One Word" (edit) / "Empty Frame" / "You Don't Miss Your Water" / "One Word" (The Woodbridge Mix) / "Grandfather's House", 1991 US CD-EP

=== Promotional tracks ===
In the early 1990s, Warner Bros. US released a series of promotional-only 7" colored vinyl split-artist EPs called Soil Samples. Each side of these 7"ers would have unreleased tracks from the sessions of the artist's record these promos were ostensibly promoting.

Soil Samples #3 had unreleased tracks by House of Freaks on one side, and two unreleased cuts from the Eno/Cale Wrong Way Up sessions on the other side: a cover of "Ring of Fire" with vocals by Eno, and the instrumental "Shuffle Down to Woodbridge", apparently Cale solo.

To date, neither of these has been issued on CD, or anywhere else except this promotional 7".

== Personnel ==
- John Cale – lead vocals (2, 3, 5, 7, 8, 9), backing vocals, pianos, keyboards, bass, harp, horn, dumbek, viola, strings, Omnichord
- Brian Eno – lead vocals (1, 2, 4, 6, 9, 10), backing vocals, keyboards, rhythm bed, Indian drum, guitars, Shinto bell, bass, little Nigerian organ, cover picture
- Robert Ahwai – rhythm guitar
- Nell Catchpole – violins
- Rhett Davies – backing vocals
- Daryl Johnson – bass
- Ronald Jones – tabla, drums
- Bruce Lampcov – backing vocals
- Dave Young – guitars, bass

Technical

- Recordings engineered by Brian Eno, except John Cale's vocals recordings, which were engineered by Dave Young
- Rhett Davies, Bruce Lampcov, Brian Eno – mixing
- Brian Eno, Kevin Cann – art, design
