= Charlotte Verity =

British painter

- Charlotte Verity in her studio, 2018
- Born: Charlotte Verity; 1 June 1954 (age 71); RAF Wegberg, West Germany
- Known for: Painting, printmaking

Charlotte Verity, Lady Le Brun (born 1 June 1954) is a British painter and printmaker. She lives and works in Somerset, England. In 2016, a monograph on her work, titled Charlotte Verity, was published by Ridinghouse.

== Biography ==
Born in Germany, Verity studied at the Slade School of Art from 1973 to 1977, receiving a prize in her final year. In 1978, she was awarded a Boise travelling scholarship, which she used to study in Italy.

Verity has participated in group exhibitions such as the John Moores Painting Prize, the Whitechapel Gallery Open, the Hayward Annual, the Discerning Eye and the Royal Academy’s Summer Exhibition.

She has held solo exhibitions at Anne Berthoud Gallery (1984, 1988, 1990), Browse and Darby (1998, 2002, 2007), Purdy Hicks Gallery (2016), the Garden Museum in London (2011 and 2018), and the New Art Centre in Wiltshire (2019).

In 2001, Verity joined the faculty of the Royal Drawing School in London, where she continues to teach. In 2010, she was commissioned by Sir John Soane’s Museum to paint a portrait of its former director, Margaret Richardson.

A monograph on her work, Charlotte Verity, was published by Ridinghouse in 2016, featuring texts by artist Garry Fabian Miller, art historian Paul Hills, and artist Edmund de Waal.

She has held residencies at institutions including the Towner Art Gallery in Eastbourne and the Garden Museum in London.

Her work is held in public collections including the Arts Council Collection (UK), Deutsche Bank, the Garden Museum (London), the Museum of Contemporary Art (San Diego), Sir John Soane’s Museum (London), Tate Education, and University College London.

Verity is married to artist Sir Christopher Le Brun, and they have three children.

== Public collections ==
- Arthur Anderson & Co
- Arts Council England
- Derby Museum and Art Gallery
- Deutsche Bank
- Eastern Arts Association
- Electra Investment Trust
- Garden Museum, London
- Museum of Contemporary Art San Diego
- Paintings in Hospitals, UK
- St George's Hospital, London
- Sir John Soane's Museum
- Stanhope Properties
- Tate Education
- Unilever
- University College London
- Westminster School
