= Kilburn and the High Roads =

Former British pub rock band founded in 1970

- Origin: London; Cambridge
- Genres: Pub rock; rock and roll; protopunk
- Years active: 1970–1975
- Labels: Dawn; Pye
- Past members: Ian Dury; Russell Hardy; Keith Lucas (Nick Cash); Humphrey Ocean; Rod Melvin; David Newton-Rohoman; Ian Smith; Edward "Ted" Speight; George Khan; Charlie Hart; Terry Day; Davey Payne; Charlie Sinclair; Chris Lucas

Kilburn and the High Roads were a British pub rock band formed in London by Ian Dury in 1970. The band released one studio album Handsome in 1975, disbanding the same year. AllMusic credits the band with being "an undeniable influence on punk and new wave".

== History ==
Dury formed Kilburn and the High Roads in 1970. The band consisted of Ian Dury as lead vocalist and lyricist, pianist Russell Hardy, guitarist Edward "Ted" Speight (later replaced by Keith Lucas), bassist Charlie Hart (later replaced by Humphrey Ocean and later by Charley Sinclair), saxophonist George Khan (later replaced by Davey Payne) and drummer Chris Lucas (replaced by Terry Day and later by ex-Kripple Vision drummer David Newton-Rohoman, who was disabled and used crutches). The band performed their first gig in 1971 and were regulars on the pub rock scene by 1973. The Kilburns also supported the Who on their Quadrophenia tour of late 1973.

The band signed to Warner Bros. subsidiary Raft Records and recorded an album in 1974 but it remained unreleased when the label was shut down. The band were managed by fashion entrepreneur Tommy Roberts, presaging acquaintance Malcolm McLaren's involvement with the Sex Pistols. Signing to Pye subsidiary Dawn Records, the band released debut single "Rough Kids" the same year and a second single and their re-recorded debut album Handsome in 1975, before disbanding soon afterwards.

Dury then formed the short-lived Ian Dury and the Kilburns and later, with different personnel, a new group, Ian Dury and the Blockheads, initially releasing records under his own name alone. Dury's solo success led to the release of a second Kilburn and the High Roads album, Wotabunch! in 1977, despite the group's earlier demise, largely duplicating the first album but remixed from earlier demos and later a compilation EP, The Best of Kilburn & the High Roads on Dury's next label, Stiff Records, in 1983.

In 2016, Cherry Red Records released an expanded edition of Handsome with a bonus disc containing a previously unreleased 1974 Capital Radio broadcast.

== Legacy ==
Davey Payne followed Dury into the Blockheads. Keith Lucas (as Nick Cash) went on to form punk band 999. Humphrey Ocean recorded a one-off single for Stiff Records in 1978, written by Dury.

Suggs has credited Kilburn and the High Roads with being "a huge influence" on Madness. Paul Simonon of the Clash has credited Dury as an influence on punk. The Sex Pistols were inspired by Chris Thomas' production on the first Kilburn's single to work with him; it has also been suggested that John Lydon borrowed some of his early performance style from Dury, although the claim is rejected by Lydon.

== Personnel ==
=== Kilburn and the High Roads ===
- Ian Dury – lead vocal, percussion (also lyricist and songwriter) (1970–75)
- Russell Hardy – piano (also songwriter) (1970–74)
- Rod Melvin – piano, vocals (also songwriter) (1974–75)
- Edward "Ted" Speight – guitar (1970)
- Keith Lucas (Nick Cash) – guitar (1971–75)
- Charlie Hart – bass (1970, 1972–73)
- Ian Smith – bass (1971)
- Humphrey Ocean – bass (1973)
- Charley Sinclair – bass (1974 –75)
- George Khan – saxophone (1970)
- Davey Payne – saxophone (1971 –75)
- Terry Day – drums (1970, 1972 –73)
- Chris Lucas – drums (1971 –72)
- David Newton-Rohoman – drums (1973, 1974 –75)
- George Butler – drums (1974)

=== Ian Dury and the Kilburns ===
- Ian Dury – lead vocal (1975 –76)
- Rod Melvin – keyboards (1975 –76)
- Edward "Ted" Speight – guitar (1975 –76)
- John Earle – saxophone (1975 –76)
- Giorgi Dionisiev – bass (1975 –76)
- Malcolm Mortimore – drums (1975 –76)
- Chaz Jankel – keyboards, guitar (1976)

== Discography ==
=== Studio albums ===
Album title	Label	Recorded	Released
Handsome	Dawn Records	1974	1975
Wotabunch!	Warner Bros. Records	1974	1977

=== Singles ===
Song title	Label	Recorded	Released
"Rough Kids"/"Billy Bentley"	Dawn Records	1974	1974
"Crippled with Nerves"/"Huffety Puff"	Dawn Records	1975	1975

=== Compilations ===
Album title	Label	Recorded	Released
The Best of Kilburn & the High-Roads	Stiff Records	1982	1983
Upminster Kids	PRT Records	1974–75	1983
