= Wotabunch! =

Studio album by Kilburn and the High-Roads
- Released: 1978
- Recorded: January 1974
- Studios: Apple, London
- Genre: Rock
- Length: 35:28
- Label: Warner Bros.
- Producer: Tony Ashton

Kilburn and the High-Roads chronology
The Best of Kilburn & The Highroads EP (1977)	Wotabunch! (1978)

Professional ratings
Review scores
Source	Rating
AllMusic	3/5 stars

Wotabunch! is an album by Kilburn and the High Roads, released by WEA in 1978 following the success of Ian Dury as a solo artist. It is technically the "second album" by the band, as though it predated their debut record Handsome it was released three years afterwards.

When talking about Kilburn and the High Roads' output in his track-by-track comments in the booklet for Repertoire Records 2CD Ian Dury & The Blockheads: Reasons to be Cheerful retrospective, Ian Dury said:

"The Kilburns made two albums, but they were both the same. The second one was to try and stop the first one coming out! In fact, it didn't prevent them, because Warner Bros. Records waited until I had some success, and then they put out that album called Wotta Bunch."

Wotabunch! was recorded in January 1974 at the Beatles' Apple Studios in London shortly after two line-up changes in the band. Two long-term members, bassist Humphrey Ocean and drummer David Newton-Rohoman, were no longer in the band at the time. In fact, new bassist Charlie Sinclair had only just joined the group when the sessions began. Newton-Rohoman had been sacked virtually on the eve of the recording sessions, being replaced by session musician Louis Larose. Charlie Sinclair and Louie Larose had left the Pub Rock band Phoenix (led by Roy St. John), in which David Newton-Rohoman replaced Larose on drums.

Though the session went fairly well, with recording interspersed with trips to local pubs, there was a problem with capturing the band's live sound. This was a problem that the Kilburns had suffered before when making demos the previous year and would suffer again when making Handsome. Some blame is given to Larose's conventional drumming style (and later, on the Handsome sessions, to producer Hugh Murphy). Despite the trouble, Wotabunch! is much closer to their live sound than the softer, polished Handsome versions. Dury was not pleased with the release due to a remix featuring the addition of strings. The final remix for the recordings was done more or less behind Dury's back, while on he was on a week-long holiday. However, this was soon to be irrelevant, as shortly after the sessions were over Raft (the record label that had signed the band) folded. The bands on the Raft label were told that they would go to WEA, who owned Raft, but after a visit from WEA's top man, Joe Smith at a concert, Kilburn and The High Roads were dropped.

In 1977, following the success of Ian Dury's solo album New Boots and Panties!!, and the good response to "Sex and Drugs and Rock and Roll", Warner Bros. Records issued the Raft recordings as Wotabunch! WEA listed the band as 'Kilburn & The Highroads featuring Ian Dury' in order to capitalize on Dury's success. The cover art, featuring cardboard cut-outs of the band posed with a group of stuffed animals, features a different line-up of the band than the one that recorded the album.

As of 2010, the album has not been re-issued on CD.

== Track listing ==
All tracks written by Ian Dury and Russell Hardy unless otherwise noted.

1. "The Call Up" – 2:24
2. "Crippled with Nerves" – 3:02
3. "Patience (So What?)" – 2:04
4. "You're More Than Fair" – 3:03
5. "Upminster Kid" – 3:26
6. "Billy Bentley" (Dury, Charlie Hart) – 3:34
7. "Huffety Puff" – 2:13
8. "Rough Kids" – 3:15
9. "The Roadette Song" – 3:05
10. "The Badger and the Rabbit" – 2:39
11. "The Mumble Rumble and the Cocktail Rock" – 3:41
12. "Pam's Moods" – 2:57

== Personnel ==
- Ian Dury – lead vocals
- Russell Hardy – piano
- Keith Lucas – guitar
- Charlie Sinclair – bass
- Davey Payne – saxophones
- Louis Larose – drums

== Sources ==
- Sex and Drugs and Rock and Roll: The Life of Ian Dury by Richard Balls, first published 2000, Omnibus Press
- Ian Dury & the Blockheads: Song by Song by Jim Drury, first published 2003, Sanctuary Publishing
- Reasons to Be Cheerful, 2-disc compilation first released 1996, Repertoire Records
