= Nerve Net =

Studio album by Brian Eno
- Released: 1 September 1992
- Genres: Experimental, electronic
- Length: 64:25
- Label: Opal/Warner Bros.
- Producer: Brian Eno

Brian Eno chronology
Wrong Way Up (1990)	Nerve Net (1992)	The Shutov Assembly (1992)

Nerve Net is the eleventh solo studio album by Brian Eno, released on 1 September 1992 on Opal and Warner Bros. Records. It marked a return to more rock-oriented material, mixed with heavily syncopated rhythms, experimental electronic compositions and occasional elements of jazz. The ambient sensibility is still present on several tracks, though it is often darker and moodier than the pieces Eno is best known for.

The album released 12-inch and CD singles for the pieces "Ali Click" and "Fractal Zoom", both of which featured various remixes of the songs by the likes of Moby, Markus Dravs and Isaac Osapanin. It received mixed reviews.

Eno's decision to eschew ambient music has been seen as ironic, as it was issued when the genre was enjoying peak popularity in Britain. Alongside several other of Eno's 1990s albums, Nerve Net was re-released in 2014, including a bonus disc containing a previously unreleased Eno album, My Squelchy Life, originally set for release in 1991.

== Background ==
During 1990 and 1991, between his sessions with U2, Eno made impromptu recordings while travelling, often with local musicians, which he assembled into the album My Squelchy Life. The Eno biographer David Sheppard described it as a "by turns playful and claustrophobic digital art funk, interleaved with dark, unsettling pools of DX7 ambience and a smattering of post-Wrong Way Up avant-pop songs". After Eno's record label, Opal, was restructured as an administrative office, he signed to Warner Records and delivered the finished album in mid-1991. Promotional copies were sent to journalists for review.

After Warner delayed the release of My Squelchy Life to 1992, Eno cancelled it and returned his advance, saying he had already moved on and was working on his next album, Nerve Net. He said: "There's always a cutting edge and a trailing edge to what you are doing. Well, when I finished that record, I knew what the cutting edge was … And so I went straight back into the studio and had begun working on some new material, which followed what I felt was the cutting edge of this soon-to-be-released record." Nerve Net included some Squelchy Life songs.

== Music ==
Eno described Nerve Net as "paella – a self-contradictory mess; off-balance, post-cool, post-root, un-centred where-am-I? music". It was released in a period when ambient music – a genre that Eno had pioneered in the 1970s – had become popular in the UK, via musicians such as the Orb. Eno instead chose to make a loud, raucous album with Nerve Net, a sharp contrast to his preceding ambient body of work. The Irish Times critic Tom Clayton-Lee later wrote that it "steered clear of Eno's ambient signatures, focusing instead of mostly broody jazz-influenced and rock-oriented compositions". It was Eno's first non-ambient solo record in over 14 years, and his last pop album until Another Day on Earth (2005).

== Reception ==
Professional ratings
Review scores
Source	Rating
AllMusic	2.5/5 stars
Drowned in Sound	8/10
Entertainment Weekly	C−
The Irish Times	4/5 stars
NME	7/10
Pitchfork	7.7/10
PopMatters	9/10
Q	3/5 stars
Select	5/5 stars
Tom Hull – on the Web	B+

David Bennun of Melody Maker called it a "loud and unmistakably self-imposing record" that is comparable to earlier collaborative albums Eno made with Roxy Music, David Bowie, Talking Heads, David Byrne and U2, albeit "with all the tunes taken out and the found noises left in." NME critic Betty Page noted that Eno eschewed soothing meditative pieces, instead "stabbing bits of broken glass into funk, jazz, electro, world and otherworld, to produce a sonic mutation clearly ahead of its time." In Select, Dave Morrison awarded Nerve Net a perfect score, deeming it wholly unlike Eno's previous work and "a plunge into the deep end of the mainstream demonstrating his remarkable knack of keeping outside and ahead of current trends while remaining a pervasive influence." Morrison played down comparisons to artists such as System 7 as lazy and insufficient, instead noting the record's eclecticism and density, resulting in a "complete electric music for the mind and body for the '90s."

In the United States, Entertainment Weekly critic Arion Berger lamented the album's dance rhythms, adding that "Nerve Net may sport intricate drumming and spoken-word weirdness, but it's woefully retro, as tinny and uninspired as the computerized synthesizer experiments of the '70s, and often as irritating." The critic Robert Christgau dismissed the album as a "dud" in his "Consumer's Guide" for The Village Voice.

Retrospectively, AllMusic's Rick Anderson named Nerve Net Eno's "most rocking solo album in years, and also his funkiest", and considering it very fun in "a slightly inhuman, claustrophobically funky sort of way" but also relatively unexciting. Douglas Wolk of Pitchfork found "more obviously a product of its time than any other Eno record", evident through the synthesiser presets and "some iffy rapping", and noted the cold, brittle sound. He called My Squelchy Life Eno's most enjoyable solo 1990s album "by a wide margin".

Drowned in Sound reviewer Alexander Tudor considered Nerve Net edgy and frequently abrasive and a rare successful example of jazztronica, comparing its funkier, more propulsive material to This Heat and its coldest and most intellectual to Autechre. Tudor also noted the influence of Fela Kuti, imbued in a way that "never feels like pastiche, ethnographic forgery (a la Can) or cultural colonialism; instead, it feels like dialogue."

In a favourable review for PopMatters, Rhea Rhollmann noted its upbeat sound, sometimes bordering jazz-rock, but retaining strong, moody ambient elements, and contrasted it with The Shutov Assembly, Eno's more ethereal follow-up album, saying: "The denser, more synthetic and more danceable Nerve Net – with its more easily discernible beats, sporadic guitar twangs, occasional minimalist vocals and piano-driven swings to spacy jazz – indeed carries a certain urban ambient vibe." The author Jim DeRogatis interprets both albums as tributes to the dance and techno producers that Eno believed were making the most innovative studio work of the period, such as the Orb and Moby, both of whom took influence from Eno's ambient works. However, DeRogatis deems both albums inferior to Wrong Way Up (1990). Ian Stonehouse named Nerve Net as one of Eno's key records in The Rough Guide to Rock (2003), saying the producer "rematerialized in fine form with this 'Bleep & Booster' song assemblage."

== Track listing ==
All tracks composed by Brian Eno.

1. "Fractal Zoom" – 6:24
2. "Wire Shock" – 5:27
3. "What Actually Happened?" – 4:41
4. "Pierre in Mist" – 3:47
5. "My Squelchy Life" – 4:02
6. "Juju Space Jazz" – 4:26
7. "The Roil, the Choke" – 5:00
8. "Ali Click" – 4:13
9. "Disturbed Being" – 6:10
10. "Web" – 6:21
11. "Web (Lascaux Mix)" – 9:44
12. "Decentre" – 3:26

=== My Squelchy Life ===
Alongside several other of Eno's 1990s albums, Nerve Net was re-released in 2014. It included a bonus disc containing the cancelled album My Squelchy Life.

1. "I Fall Up"
2. "The Harness"
3. "My Squelchy Life"
4. "Tutti Forgetti"
5. "Stiff"
6. "Some Words"
7. "Juju Space Jazz"
8. "Under"
9. "Everybody's Mother"
10. "Little Apricot"
11. "Over"

== Personnel ==
- Robert Ahwai – guitar
- Peter Anderson – guitar
- Richard Bailey – drums
- Duchess Nell Catchpole – vocals, voices
- Ian Dench – drum loop
- Markus Dravs – drums, drum programming, treatments
- Wayne Duchamp – alto saxophone
- Brian Eno – organ, synthesiser, keyboards, tenor saxophone, bass guitar, guitar, vocals, voices, multi instruments, guitar treatments, African organ, animal sounds, Arabesque
- Roger Eno – piano, sampling
- Robert Fripp – guitar
- John Paul Jones – piano
- John May – voices, speech/speaker/speaking part
- Rod Melvin – piano
- Sugarfoot Moffett – drums
- John Moorby – voices, speech/speaker/speaking part
- Alice Ngukwe – tenor saxophone
- Winston Ngukwe – conga
- Isaac Osapanin – conga
- Anita Patel – voices, speech/speaker/speaking part
- Sunita Patel – voices, speech/speaker/speaking part
- Yogish Patel – voices, speech/speaker/speaking part
- Curtis Pelican – trumpet
- Robert Quine – guitar, rhythm guitar
- Gregg Arreguin – guitar
- Cecil Stamper III – drums
- Benmont Tench – percussion
- Christine West-Oram – vocals
- Jamie West-Oram – guitar, rhythm guitar
- Romeo Williams – bass guitar

== Singles ==
In conjunction with Nerve Net, two CD maxi-singles were released.

=== Ali Click ===
Ali Click (1992) is a CD maxi-single of remixes of the song "Ali Click" from Brian Eno's album Nerve Net. It is also notable for including a version of "I Fall Up", a track from the withdrawn My Squelchy Life album, which is longer than the 3:42 version included in Eno Box II: Vocal.

1. "Ali Click [Grid Master Edit]" – 4:48
2. "Ali Click [Album Edit]" – 3:41
3. "Ali Click [Rural 'Doo Gap' Mix]" – 4:43
4. "Ali Click [Trance Mix – Long]" – 7:28
5. "Ali Click [Darkly Mad Mix]" – 4:09
6. "Ali Click [Grid Master Remix]" – 7:10
7. "Ali Click [Beirut Hilton Mix]" – 4:04
8. "I Fall Up" – 4:54

=== Fractal Zoom ===
Fractal Zoom (1992) is a CD maxi-single of remixes of the song "Fractal Zoom" from Brian Eno's album Nerve Net. Tracks marked '*' mixed by Markus "Dravius" Draws. Tracks marked '**' mixed remixed with additional production by Moby.

1. "Fractal Zoom [Separate Time Edit]" * – 4:14
2. "Fractal Zoom [Mary's Birthday Edit]" ** – 3:50
3. "Fractal Zoom [Up River Mix]" ** – 8:10
4. "Fractal Zoom [Small Country]" * – 7:00
5. "The Roil, The Choke" – 5:03
6. "Fractal Zoom [Naive Mix I]" ** – 5:27
7. "Fractal Zoom [Zaire Mix]" * – 6:16
8. "Fractal Zoom [Naive Mix II]" ** – 5:56
9. "Fractal Zoom [Landed Mix]" ** – 5:55
10. "Fractal Zoom [Bucolic Mix]" ** – 4:44
11. "Fractal Zoom [Separate Time Full Length]" * – 6:26
12. "Fractal Zoom [Mary's Birthday Mix]" ** – 7:06
