= Christopher Le Brun =

British artist

Sir Christopher Mark Le Brun PPRA
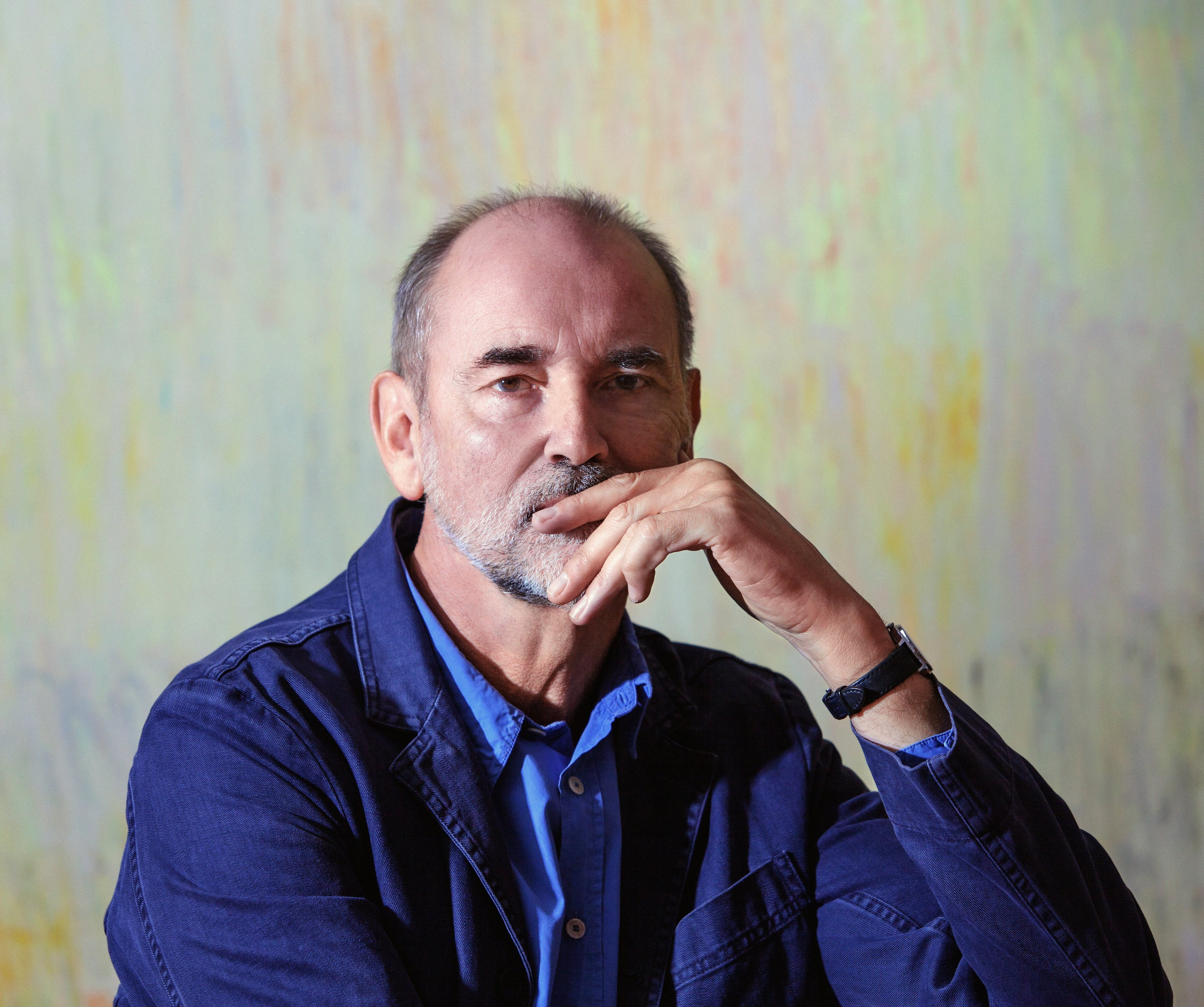
- Le Brun in 2018
- Born: 20 December 1951 (age 74); Portsmouth, England, UK
- Education: Slade School of Art (1970–74); Chelsea School of Art (1974–75)
- Known for: Painting; sculpture; printmaking
- Notable work: Union (Horse with Two Discs)
- Spouse: Charlotte Verity
- Awards: John Moores Painting Prize (Shortlisted, 1978) (3rd Prize, 1980); Gulbenkian Printmakers Award (1983); DAAD (1987–88); Turner Medal for Watercolour, RA Summer Exhibition 2005; University of the Arts London Honorary Fellow (2011)
- Elected: RA (1996); PRA (2011–19)
- Website: christopherlebrun.co.uk

Sir Christopher Mark Le Brun PPRA (born 1951) is a British artist, known primarily as a painter. President of the Royal Academy of Arts from 2011 to December 2019, Le Brun was knighted in the 2021 New Year Honours "for services to the arts".

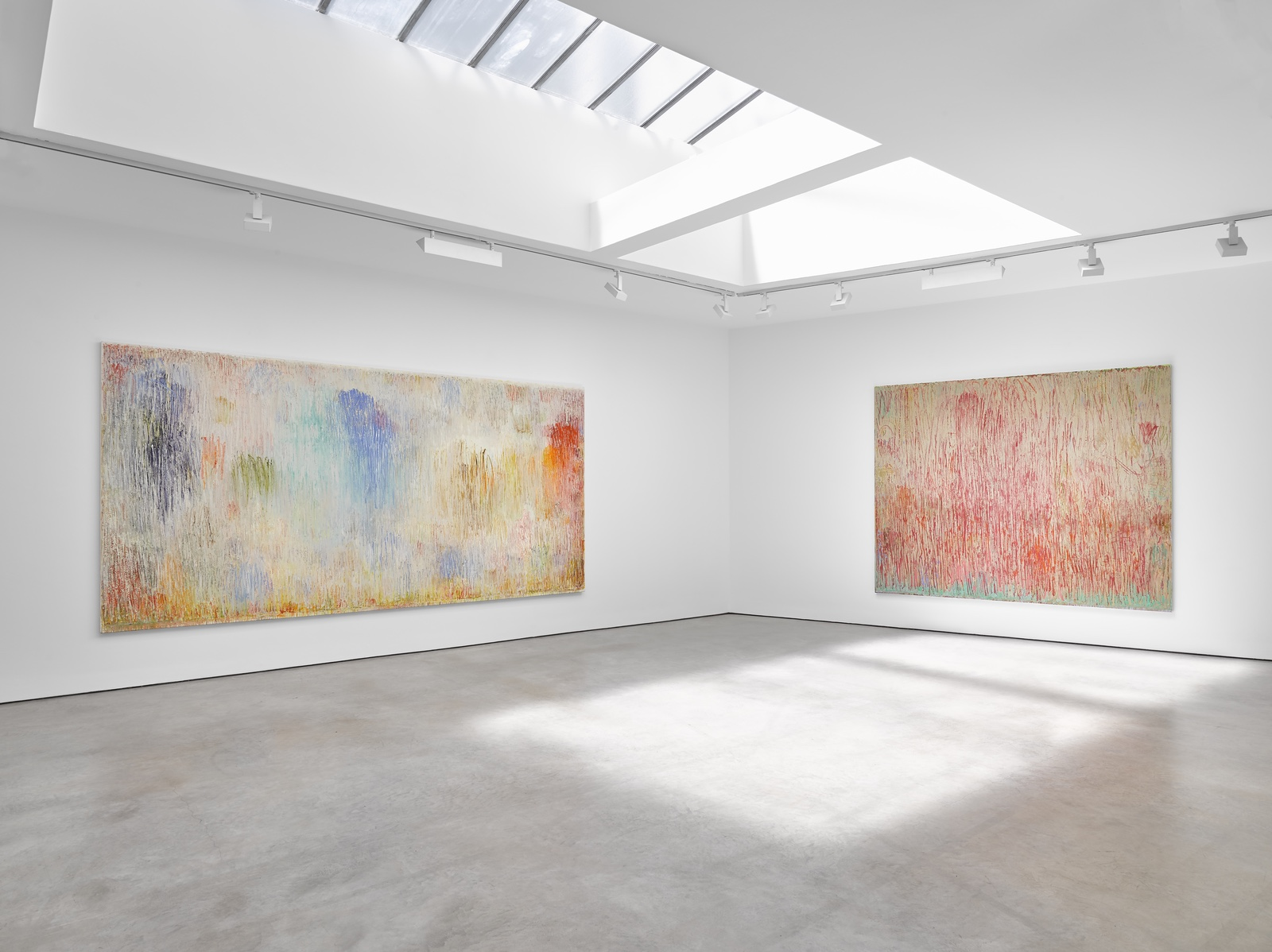
Two paintings by Christopher Le Brun from his exhibition "New Painting" at Lisson Gallery, 2018

== Biography ==
Le Brun was born in Portsmouth in 1951. From 1970–74, he studied for the DFA at Slade School of Art and for an MA at Chelsea College of Arts between 1974–75. He has taught and lectured at art schools, including Brighton, the Slade, Chelsea, Wimbledon and Royal Drawing School. A double prizewinner at the biennial John Moores Painting Prize, Le Brun was one of ten Shortlisted Prize Winners in 1978, and won 3rd Prize in 1980. His first solo exhibition was in 1980 with Nigel Greenwood Gallery and soon after he was included in international exhibitions such as the Venice Biennale and Zeitgeist at Martin-Gropius-Bau, Berlin. His international art include, "An International Survey of Recent Painting and Sculpture]" at the Museum of Modern Art, New York in 1984, "Avant-garde in the Eighties" at the Los Angeles County Museum of Art in 1987 and "Contemporary Voices" at MoMA in 2005.

He was one of the five artists shortlisted for a monumental sculpture commission, the Ebbsfleet Landmark (Angel of the South) in 2008. In 2011, he was the chief co-ordinator of the Royal Academy Summer Exhibition. On 8 December 2011, he was elected president of the Royal Academy and interviewed about his role by the Guardian Professional Networks in 2013. During his presidency, he was closely involved in the most significant redevelopment in the academy’s 250 year history. Le Brun stepped down in December 2019. He lives and works in London and is married to the artist Charlotte Verity.

== Printmaking ==
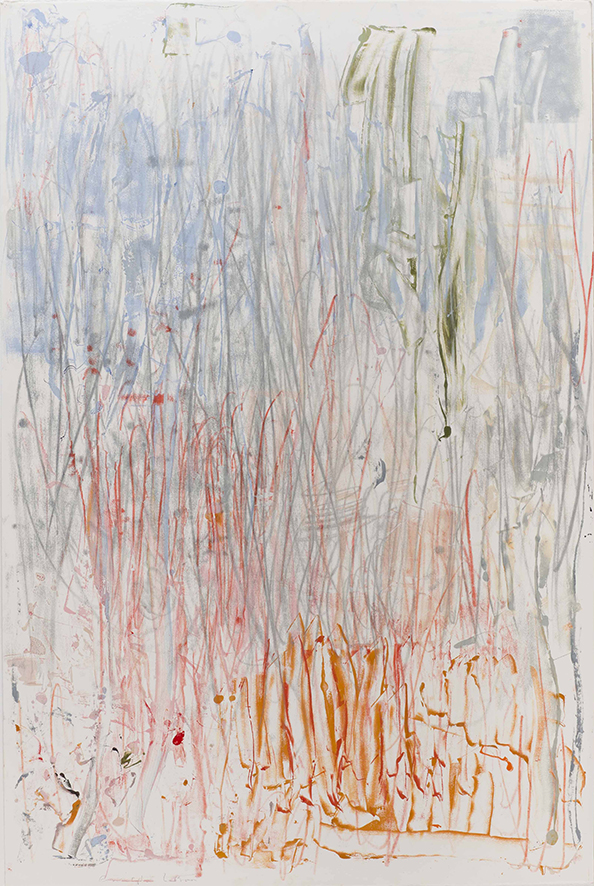
Christopher Le Brun, SL L IX, 2016, monoprint, 152 x 103 cm.

Le Brun is an experienced printmaker working in etching, lithography, woodcut and monotype. He had long term collaborations with Peter Kosowicz and Simon Marsh of the former Hope Sufferance Press as well as Paupers Press in London, Garner and Richard Tullis in Santa Barbara, Michael Woolworth Publications in Paris and Graphic Studio in Dublin. Most recently, he has been working with Paragon Press in London.

== Works ==
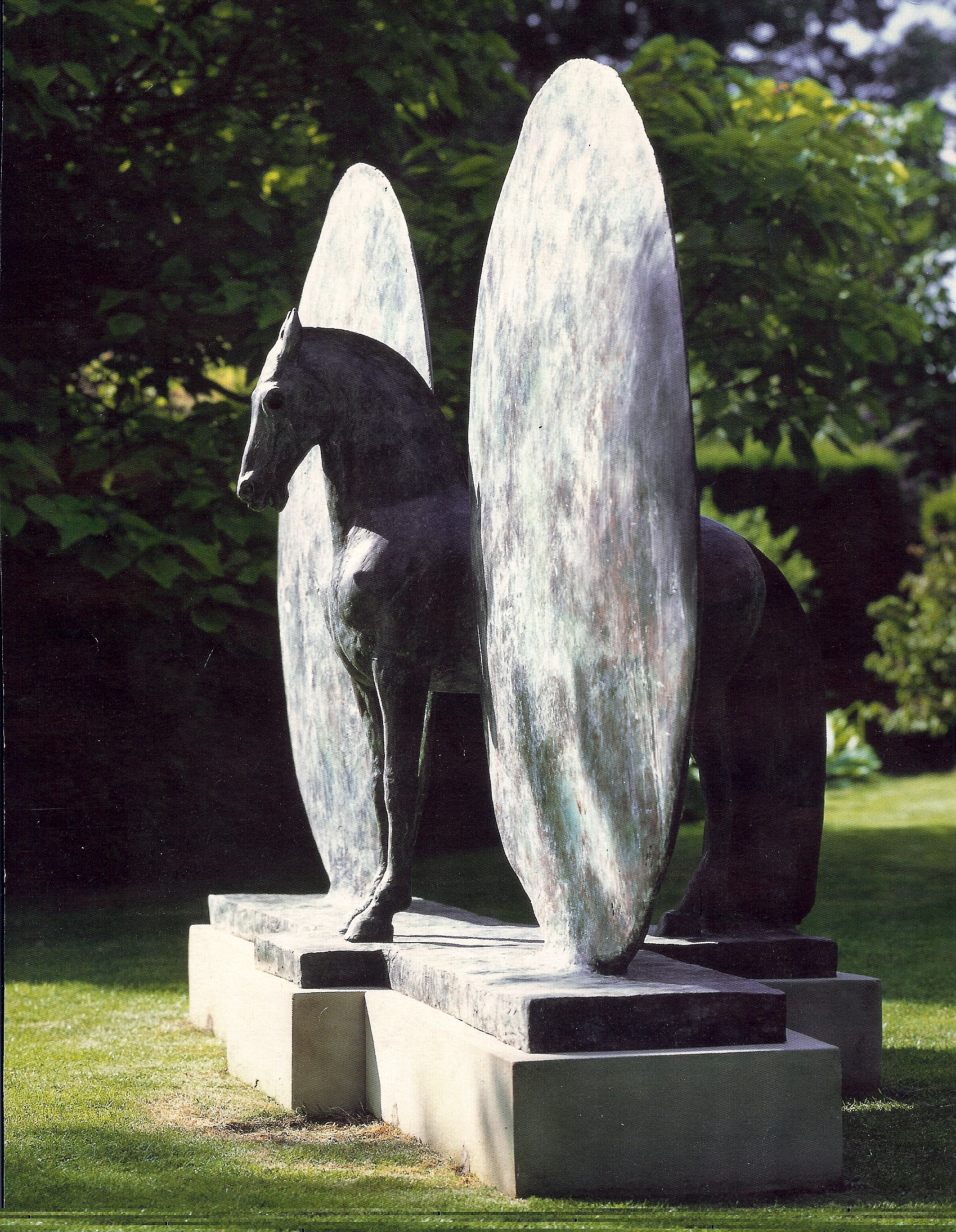
Christopher Le Brun, Union (Horse with Two Discs), 1999–2000, Bronze, 469 x 255 x 158 cm. Installed in New Art Centre, Wiltshire.

- City Wing, 2009–13, 1,050 x 325 x 60 cm, bronze. A monumental sculpture was installed on Threadneedle Walk in Bank, London in 2013.
- A cast of his large bronze sculpture, Union (Horse with Two Discs) 1999–2000, was acquired by and installed at the entrance to the Museum of London in 2005. This was Le Brun's first large scale bronze.

Notable publications include Seven Lithographs 1989, Fifty Etchings 1991, Four Riders 1993, Wagner 1994, Motif Light 1998, Paris Lithographs 2000, Fifty Etchings 2005, Seria 2015–2016, Composer 2017, Doubles 2018, New Painting 2018.

== Public collections ==
- His work can be found in museum collections including the Museum of Modern Art and the Metropolitan Museum of Art, New York; Yale Center for British Art, New Haven; Tate, the V&A and the British Museum, London; and Art Gallery of New South Wales, Sydney.

Cultural offices
Preceded by Sir Nicholas Grimshaw	President of the Royal Academy; 2011–2019	Succeeded by Rebecca Salter
