= Another Green World =

1975 studio album by Brian Eno

Studio album by Eno
- Released: 14 November 1975
- Recorded: July–August 1975
- Studios: Island, London
- Genres: Art pop; ambient; electronic pop; art rock; minimalist; ambient pop; avant-pop
- Length: 40:40
- Label: Island
- Producers: Eno; Rhett Davies

Eno chronology
Taking Tiger Mountain (By Strategy) (1974)	Another Green World (1975)	Evening Star (1975)

Another Green World is the third solo studio album by the English musician Brian Eno (credited as "Eno"), released by Island Records on 14 November 1975. It was produced by Eno and Rhett Davies. It marked a transition from the rock-based music of Eno's previous releases towards his late 1970s ambient work. Only five of its fourteen tracks feature vocals, a contrast with his previous albums.

Another Green World features contributions from musicians including Robert Fripp (electric guitar), Phil Collins (drums), Percy Jones (fretless bass), Rod Melvin (piano) and John Cale (viola). Employing tactics derived from his Oblique Strategies cards for guidance, Eno and the musicians variety of unconventional recording techniques and instrumental approaches, reflected in unusual instrumental credits such as "snake guitar" and "uncertain piano". The cover art is a detail from British artist Tom Phillips' After Raphael.

Although Another Green World received acclaim, its only contemporary chart success was in New Zealand, where it reached number 24. Several publications, including Rolling Stone, NME and Pitchfork, have named the album among the greatest of the 1970s and of all time.

== Production ==
Another Green World was recorded at Island Studios in Notting Hill, London, in July and August 1975. Brian Eno originally viewed his new album as an experiment and entered the recording studio with nothing written or prepared. For the first four days in the studio, Eno failed to be productive. To look for new ideas, Eno turned to his Oblique Strategies cards and began coming up with new ideas, as he had done on his previous album Taking Tiger Mountain (By Strategy).

Some of the album credits for the instruments have fanciful names that describe the sound they make. The "castanet guitars" are electric guitars played with mallets, electronically treated to sound something like castanets. The "Leslie piano" is an acoustic piano fed through a Leslie speaker. Eno described the "snake guitar" and "digital guitar" thus: "the kind of lines I was playing reminded me of the way a snake moves through the brush, a sort of speedy, forceful, liquid quality. Digital guitar is a guitar threaded through a digital delay but fed back on itself a lot so it makes this cardboard tube type of sound."

As on his previous two solo efforts, Eno had several guest musicians contributing to Another Green World, but also worked on more solo material. Eno played all the instruments on seven songs, including keyboards, guitars and percussion. Among the guest musicians was Phil Collins, who had played drums on the Tiger Mountain track "Mother Whale Eyeless" and got along with Eno, which led to calling him and his Brand X bandmate Percy Jones to play on Another Green World. On recording the album, Collins recalled:

[Eno] gave us all a bit of paper and we made lists from one to 15. Eno said "No. 2, we all play a G; No. 7 we all play a C sharp"; an so on. So it was like painting by numbers... [Eno] used to love me and Percy; we'd go in and run through our dictionary licks and he'd record them and make a loop of them.

The King Crimson guitarist Robert Fripp, who had worked with Eno on (No Pussyfooting) and Here Come the Warm Jets, performed the solo on "St. Elmo's Fire". Eno asked Fripp to improvise a fast guitar solo that would imitate an electrical charge in a Wimshurst high-voltage generator; this was credited as "Wimshurst guitar".

== Music and lyrics ==
Another Green World represents a turning point in Eno's career. While his previous albums had contained rock songs, only five of the fourteen tracks on Another Green World have lyrics. Critic Ian Wade of The Quietus noted that it is "much calmer" than Eno's previous work, "smoothed into a new pastoral ambient pop". Music critic Jim DeRogatis called it an ambient and art-pop album. According to eMusic's Richard Gehr, the music veers from the guitar-oriented experimental rock of Here Come the Warm Jets and Taking Tiger Mountain to the synthesiser-oriented ambient minimalism of Eno's subsequent work. Its minimalist instrumentals are scattered among more structured art-rock songs. According to AllMusic's Steve Huey, most of the album consists of "paced instrumentals that, while often closer to ambient music than pop, are both melodic and rhythmic". The instrumental tracks mark a transition between Eno's earlier rock songs and his later instrumental works in which texture and timbre are the most important musical elements. Dave Simpson described the album as creating a "largely song-based electronic pop", while AllMusic's Jason Ankeny described it as an art rock album.

"Sky Saw" opens the album with the instruments constantly changing parts, except for one of the two bass parts which plays the same pattern throughout. Eno later re-used portions of "Sky Saw" for a track on Music for Films in 1978 and a song on Ultravox's 1977 debut album, which he co-produced. According to Mike Powell, the album's instrumental pieces "start on A and linger, accumulating countermelodies, magnifying themes, staying the same and yet revealing new sides with every turn." On "In Dark Trees" and "The Big Ship", Eno plays all of the instruments. These instrumental pieces and others like "Little Fishes" have been described as "highly imagistic, like paintings done in sound that actually resemble their titles".

To create the lyrics, Eno would sing nonsense syllables to himself over the backing tracks, which he would then form into words and phrases. This method was used for all his vocal-based recordings of the 1970s. The tracks that do feature lyrics are in the same free-associative style as Eno's previous albums, with "gently whimsical and addled" humour.

== Release and reception ==
Retrospective professional ratings
Review scores
Source	Rating
AllMusic	5/5 stars
Blender	5/5 stars
Christgau's Record Guide	A+
Entertainment Weekly	A
Mojo	5/5 stars
The New Zealand Herald	4/5 stars
Pitchfork	9.8/10 (2004); 10/10 (2016)
The Rolling Stone Album Guide	5/5 stars
Spin Alternative Record Guide	10/10
Uncut	5/5 stars

Released by Island Records on 14 November 1975, Another Green World did not chart in either the United Kingdom or the United States. However, it received generally positive reviews. Henry Edwards of High Fidelity considered it Eno's most accessible album to date. Tom Hull of The Village Voice felt that, although it was not his best album, it was "his easiest to love". Charley Walters of Rolling Stone found it a "major triumph" that Eno's creative risks "so consistently pan out", and deemed it important and brilliant. Negative reviews focused on the lack of the rock songs from Eno's previous albums. Jon Pareles, writing in Crawdaddy!, found its electronic excursions less challenging than Eno's previous progressive rock songs and wrote: "This ain't no Eno record. I don't care what the credits say. It doesn't even get on my nerves." Lester Bangs was bored by much of the music and said that "those little pools of sound on the outskirts of silence seemed to me the logical consequence of letting the processes and technology share your conceptual burden".

Robert Christgau, who originally gave the album an "A−" in his review for The Village Voice, admitted that he resisted it at first, but grew to "love every minute of this arty little collection of static (i.e., non-swinging) synthesizer pieces (with vocals, percussion, and guitar)". In Christgau's Record Guide: Rock Albums of the Seventies (1981), he said that the fourteen pieces can be appreciated both individually and as a whole, calling the album "the aural equivalent of a park on the moon – oneness with nature under conditions of artificial gravity". In 1977, Another Green World was voted the 11th best album of 1976 in The Village Voice's Pazz & Jop critics' poll. Christgau, the poll's creator, ranked it second on his own list.

In 2004, Virgin Records began issuing remasters of Eno's albums in digipaks. Modern reception of Another Green World has been more unanimously positive. Steve Huey of AllMusic called it "a universally acknowledged masterpiece" and "the perfect introduction to [Eno's] achievements even for those who find ambient music difficult to enjoy". Mike Powell of Pitchfork deemed it Eno's definitive album, and Q wrote that it was "breathtakingly ahead of its time". J. D. Considine, writing in The Rolling Stone Album Guide (2004), said that Eno used the recording studio for the album "as an instrument, molding directed improvisations, electronic effects, and old-fashioned songcraft into perfectly balanced aural ecosystems". In his review for Blender, Douglas Wolk said that the clarity of the remastered edition "makes it easier to pay attention to every [song's] subtle complexities".

== Legacy ==
Pitchfork named Another Green World the tenth-greatest album of the 1970s. Rolling Stone ranked it number 429 on its 2012 list of the 500 greatest albums of all time, and number 338 in the updated 2020 list. In 2003, Blender included it on its list of 500 essential records, calling it "experimental yet accessible" and "exactly the kind of album that Eno devotees long for from him today". An extract from the title track was used as the theme music for the BBC Two television documentary series Arena.

== Track listing ==
All tracks are written by Brian Eno.

Side one
No.	Title	Length
1.	"Sky Saw"	3:25
2.	"Over Fire Island"	1:49
3.	"St. Elmo's Fire"	3:02
4.	"In Dark Trees"	2:29
5.	"The Big Ship"	3:01
6.	"I'll Come Running"	3:48
7.	"Another Green World"	1:38
Total length:		19:12

Side two
No.	Title	Length
8.	"Sombre Reptiles"	2:26
9.	"Little Fishes"	1:30
10.	"Golden Hours"	4:01
11.	"Becalmed"	3:56
12.	"Zawinul/Lava"	3:00
13.	"Everything Merges with the Night"	3:59
14.	"Spirits Drifting"	2:36
Total length:		21:28 (40:40)

== Personnel ==
Credits adapted from Another Green World back cover.

- Brian Eno – guitars (tracks 1–8, 10, 13), vocals (tracks 1, 3, 6, 10, 13), synthesizers (tracks 2, 4–6, 11, 12, 14), tapes (tracks 2, 8, 12), organ (tracks 3, 7–10, 12, 14), piano (tracks 3, 6, 7, 9–12), bass pedals (track 3), electric percussion (tracks 3–6, 8, 10), treated rhythm generator (tracks 4, 5), bass guitar (tracks 4, 5, 7–11, 14)
- Phil Collins – drums (tracks 1, 2), percussion (track 12)
- John Cale – viola (tracks 1, 10)
- Robert Fripp – electric guitar (tracks 3, 6, 10)
- Percy Jones – fretless bass guitar (tracks 1, 2, 12)
- Paul Rudolph – bass guitar (tracks 1, 6), snare drum (track 6), guitars (tracks 6, 12)
- Rod Melvin – electric piano (tracks 1, 12), lead piano (track 6)
- Brian Turrington – bass guitar and piano (track 13)

Production

- Brian Eno – production
- Rhett Davies – production, engineering
- Guy Bidmead – engineering assistance
- Barry Sage – engineering assistance
- Robert Ash – engineering assistance
- Bob Bowkett – sleeve typography
- Ritva Saarikko – back cover photography
- Tom Phillips – cover art (detail from After Raphael)

== Charts ==
Chart (1979)	Peak position
New Zealand Albums Chart	24

== See also ==
- Before and After Science
- 1975 in music
- British rock
- Music of the United Kingdom (1970s)
