= Paris s'eveille - suivi d'autres compositions =

Compilation album by John Cale
- Released: 1991
- Genre: Classical
- Length: 59:33
- Label: Les Disques du Crépuscule
- Producer: John Cale

John Cale chronology
| Wrong Way Up (1990) | Paris s'eveille - suivi d'autres compositions (1991) | Fragments of a Rainy Season (1992) |

Paris s'eveille - suivi d'autres compositions is a compilation album by Welsh multi-instrumentalist and composer John Cale, centered around the score to Olivier Assayas' film Paris s'eveille, featuring the Soldier String Quartet. It was released in 1991 on Belgian independent label Les Disques du Crépuscule. Cale wrote "Sanctus" for the Randy Warshaw Dance Company in 1987, "Animals at Night" for the Ralph Lemon Dance Company in the same year, and "Primary Motive" for Daniel Adams' film Primary Motive. "Booker T." was recorded live by The Velvet Underground at the Gymnasium club in New York in April 1967. The final song is a newly recorded version of "Antarctica Starts Here" from Cale's 1973 album Paris 1919.

== Track listing ==
All tracks composed by John Cale, except "Booker T." by Cale, Sterling Morrison, Lou Reed and Maureen Tucker. String arrangements and orchestra conducted by Dave Soldier.

1. "Paris s'eveille" − 17:07
2. "Sanctus (Four Etudes for Electronic Orchestra)" − 18:49
  1. "First Etude"
  2. "Second Etude"
  3. "Third Etude"
  4. "Fourth Etude"
3. "Animals at Night" − 4:46
4. "The Cowboy Laughs at the Round-up" − 5:04
5. "Primary Motive" − 7:20
  1. "Factory Speech"
  2. "Strategy Session"
  3. "Closing Titles"
6. "Booker T." − 3:07
7. "Antarctica Starts Here" − 3:20
