= Union (Horse with Two Discs) =

Sculpture by Christopher Le Brun

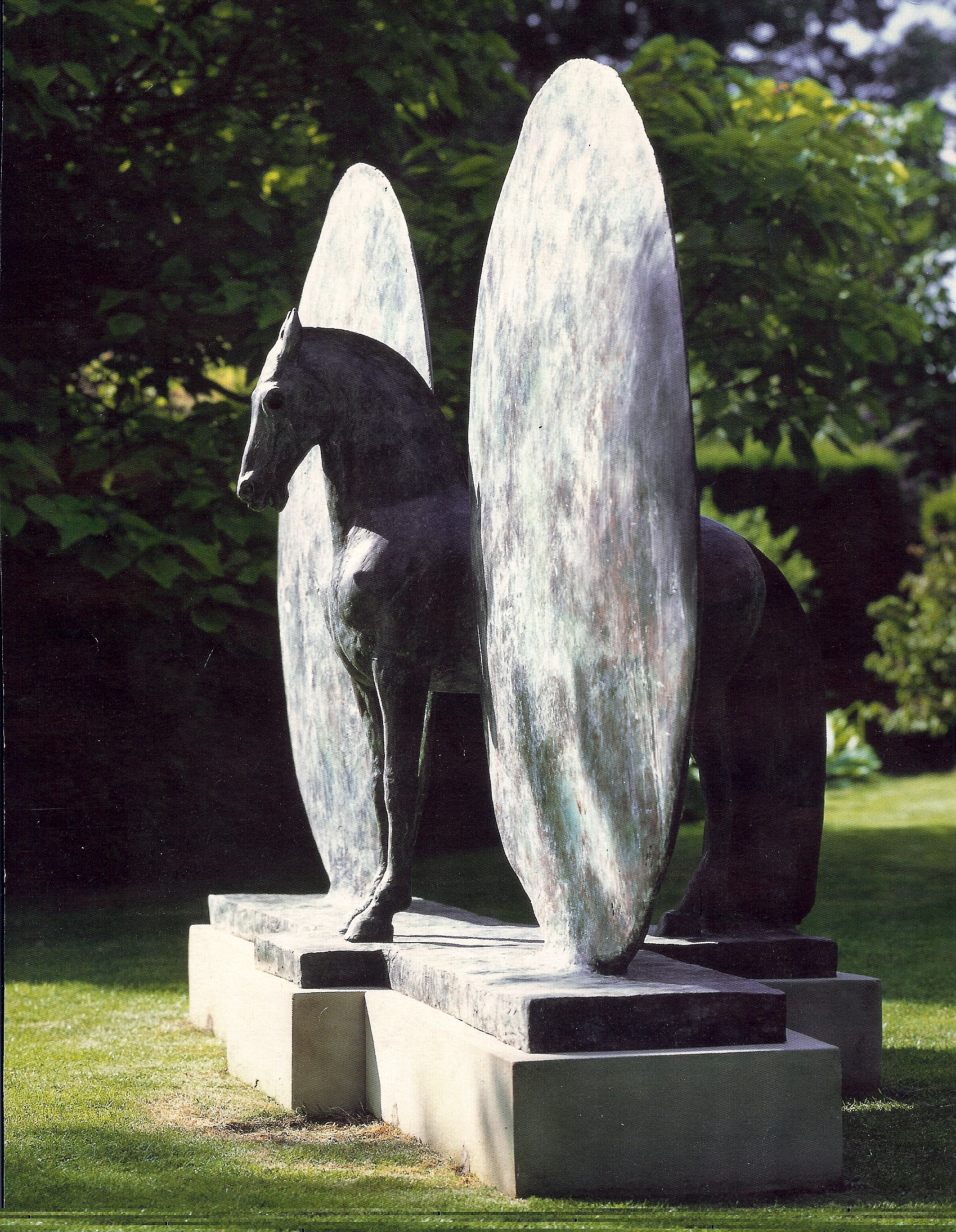
Christopher Le Brun, Union (Horse with Two Discs), 1999–2000, Bronze, 469 x 255 x 158 cm. Installed in the New Art Centre, Wiltshire.

Union (Horse with Two Discs) is a bronze sculpture by Christopher Le Brun, made in 1999–2000 in an edition of three large casts. It depicts a horse standing square on four legs, flanked on either side by a large disc. The sculpture measures 469 cm × 255 cm × 158 cm (185 in × 100 in × 62 in). One cast has been displayed on the highwalk at London Wall, beside the entrance to the Museum of London, since 2005. A second cast is held in a private collection, but it has been exhibited in the gardens of Schloss Wendlinghausen at Dörentrup, in Germany. The third and final cast is displayed at the New Art Centre, at Roche Court in Wiltshire.

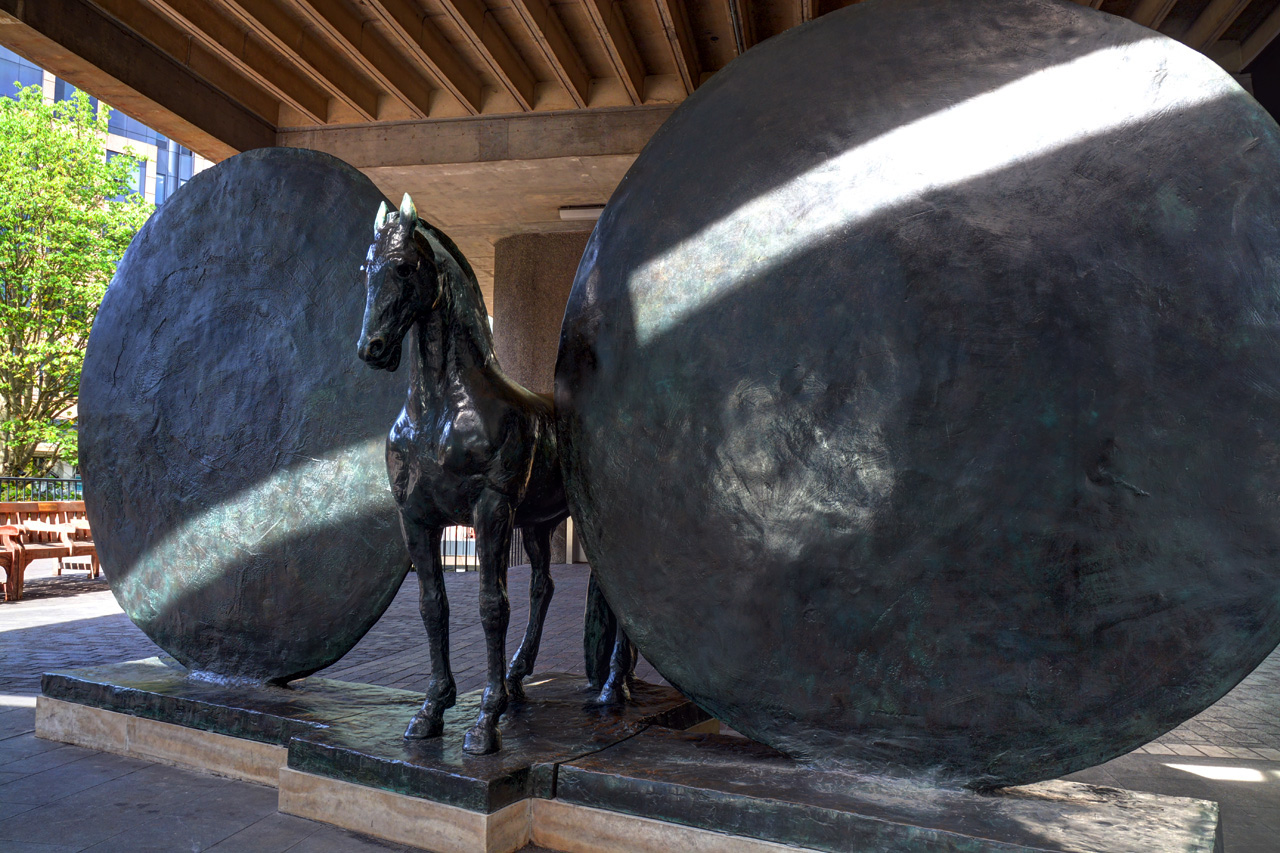
The cast at the Museum of London
