= Rebecca Salter =

English artist (born 1955)

Rebecca Salter CBE PRA
- Born: 1955 (age 70–71)
- Education: Bristol Polytechnic
- Occupation: Artist
- Known for: First female President of the Royal Academy of Arts
- Website: www.rebeccasalter.com

Rebecca Margaret Salter (born 1955) is a British abstract artist who lives and works in London, England. Previously elected Keeper in 2017, she was elected as the first female President of the Royal Academy of Arts in London on 10 December 2019. Formerly a ceramicist, she is best known as painter and printmaker. Salter specialises in woodblock printing, combining Western and Eastern traditions. She has written two books on Japanese wood blocks: Japanese Woodblock (2001) and Japanese Popular Prints: From Votive Slips to Playing Cards (2006).

== Education ==
Rebecca Salter trained at Bristol Polytechnic, graduating in 1977. According to Gillian Forrester, George Rainer, Salter's teacher at Bristol, motivated his students not to be confined to their chosen media, but to use the opportunity of university to experiment. Salter enjoyed the freedom to engage with mixed media and practices, which has become an integral part of her ongoing practice.

In 1979, Salter received a Leverhulme Scholarship, enabling her to become a research student at Kyoto City University of Arts in Japan until 1981. She studied traditional Japanese woodblock printing with Professor Kurosaki Akira. Salter was an associate lecturer on the MA Printmaking course at Camberwell College of Arts before 2016.

== Work ==
Salter lived and worked in Japan from 1979 to 1985. This move changed the nature of her work significantly, having an impact not only on her palette but on her artistic practice also. She began working more with two-dimensional works, creating pieces that complicate the relationship between painting, drawing, printmaking and sculpture. Her earliest, Untitled B119 (1981), is a suite of woodblock prints on paper, stained with persimmon juice, to give the impression of age, reminiscent of Japanese wab. She also studied calligraphy in the evenings, which she learnt was more than merely drawing lines but about dynamic movement.

Arriving back in London, in 1985, Salter took up painting on canvas. Though she was no longer a ceramicist, she continued to view her practice as "making an object" rather than a surface. Her time in Japan continued to prevail through this new medium. Calligraphic traditions can be seen through the lines in Untitled RR21 (2009), which Sadako Okhi suggests is reminiscent of a lily pond by Monet, where the lilies have been replaced by killifish. She won the Pollock-Krasner Foundation award in 1995 and the Cheltenham Open Drawing award in 1997.

In 2009, Salter worked on the refurbishment of St George's Hospital in Tooting, south London, in collaboration with architects Gibberd. The refurbishment demonstrated her engagement with the Japanese concepts of space and her belief in the therapeutic value of art. Salter said:

"For my inspiration as to how to transform the new main entrance into a special place, I turned to aspects of Japanese art and architecture which have influenced me since studying there earlier in my career. The most important spatial concept I wanted to introduce was an intuitive way of navigating using light and texture. I hope that anyone arriving at the perimeter of the site will no longer need to study a map for directions."

Salter has twice (2003, 2011) been artist in residence at the Josef and Anni Albers Foundation, Connecticut, where she envisaged her work would be a tribute to Josef Albers' practice.

Salter exhibits regularly in London, and internationally. In 2011, she had her first major museum retrospective, Into the light of things, at the Yale Center for British Art, Connecticut. It was more than a conventional retrospective of a single artist's work; it was a sustained investigation of the centrality of drawing to art making and of the notion of a dialogue between Eastern and Western aesthetics, artistic practice, and architecture.

=== Royal Academy of Arts ===
In 2014, Salter was elected as a Royal Academician by the Royal Academy of Arts in London and in 2017, she was elected as Keeper of the Royal Academy; with the responsibility of guiding the RA Schools.

In 2019, Salter was elected as President of the Royal Academy on 10 December, the first female President in the Royal Academy's then 251 year history. She continued to hold the position of Keeper until an election was held to appoint a new Keeper of the RA Schools in 2020.

== Selected exhibitions ==
- LINE, Fosterart, London, UK, 2004
- Bliss of Solitude, Beardsmore Gallery, London, UK, 2006
- The Unguiet Gaze, Howard Scott Gallery, New York, USA, 2007
- Pale Remembered, Beardsmore Gallery, London, UK, 2009
- Into the Light of Things, Yale Center for British Art, Connecticut, USA, 2011
- In Praise of Shadows, Cassina Projects, NYC and ARTUNER.com, 2017
- The Realm of Objects and Ideas, ARTUNER.com, 2018
- Memories Arrested in Space, The Italian Cultural Institute of London and ARTUNER.com, 2018
- One Year Anniversary Show, Galerie Pugliese Levi, Berlin, Germany, 2018
- Multiple Thoughts: Artists Make Prints, The Keeper's House, Royal Academy of Arts, London, UK, 2018

== Selected bibliography ==
- 2001: Japanese Woodblock Printing, A & C Black.
- 2006: Japanese Popular Prints: From Votive Slips to Playing Cards, University of Hawaii Press.

Cultural offices
Preceded by Christopher Le Brun	President of the Royal Academy of Arts; 2019–present	Incumbent
