= Rod Melvin =

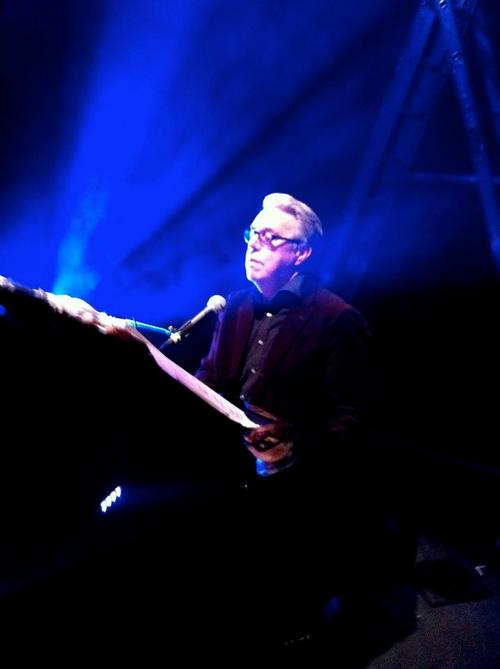

Background information
- Born: Rod Melvin; Whitehaven, England
- Occupations: Musician, songwriter, composer, singer
- Years active: 1976–present
- Website: rodmelvin.com

Rod Melvin is an English, London-based pianist and singer, appearing regularly at residencies such as the Groucho Club and previously Le Pont de la Tour.

He studied Fine Art at Chelsea School of Art and Reading University where he was a co-founder of The Moodies, a performance-art/cabaret group which included Anne Bean.

After touring with The Moodies and appearing in two films in Germany, Melvin joined Kilburn and the High Roads, the band of Ian Dury. The band recorded two singles and an album Handsome which included two compositions by Melvin in collaboration with Dury. After the band's demise, Dury and Melvin continued writing and this work produced "England's Glory" recorded by Max Wall and "What a Waste", later recorded by Ian and The Blockheads which became Dury's first Top Ten hit.

As well as playing on Brian Eno's albums Another Green World, Music For Films and Nerve Net, Melvin has worked with performers Lindsay Kemp, Evelyn Kunneke and Immodesty Blaize and has continued his work as a live pianist and singer in many different venues.

More recent work has included live accompaniment of incidental music for several productions at the National Theatre and collaboration with film director Peter Richardson on several films including Stella Street (2004), Churchill: The Hollywood Years (2004) and TV commercials; some of his music was also used in Sex & Drugs & Rock & Roll (2010).

Melvin took part in a series of performances in February 2013 at the ICA, London for Will Gompertz, the BBC arts editor at the time.

In 2013, Melvin was invited to play on the Mick Ronson tribute album, Sweet Dreamer, produced by Maggi Ronson. A live showcase of this work was previewed at the ICA in April 2013.

Melvin is married to the painter Johanna Melvin . They have three sons.

== Work in film ==
=== Composer ===
- Beyond Biba: A Portrait of Barbara Hulanicki (Documentary)(2009)
- The Comic Strip Presents... (TV Series)

- Sex Actually (2005)
- War (1983)

- Churchill: The Hollywood Years (2004)
- Stella Street (2004)
- Coilin and Platonida (1976)

=== Soundtrack ===
- Top of the Pops: The Story of 1978 (TV Movie documentary) (writer: "What a Waste") (2013)
- Sex & Drugs & Rock & Roll (writer: "What a Waste") (2010)
- Churchill: The Hollywood Years (performer: "For All We Know") (2004)
- Top of the Pops (TV Series), episode dated 25 May 1978 (writer: "What a Waste") (1978)

=== Music department ===
- Chemical Wedding (musician: additional keyboards) (2008)
- The Comic Strip (TV short) (musician) (1981)

== Actor ==
- Alexei Sayle's Stuff – Whistling Calculus for Tax Purposes (TV Series) (1989)
