= Peter Trippi =

Peter Trippi is editor-in-chief of Fine Art Connoisseur, a bimonthly magazine for collectors of representational painting, sculpture, drawings and prints—both historical and contemporary. From 2003 until 2006, Trippi was director of New York City's Dahesh Museum of Art, the only institution in the United States devoted to 19th- and early 20th-century European academic art.

Most recently, Trippi co-curated (with Elizabeth Prettejohn and Ivo Blom) the major touring exhibition Lawrence Alma-Tadema: At Home in Antiquity. Organized by the Fries Museum (Leeuwarden, Netherlands), this project premiered at that museum on 1 October 2016; it closed there on 7 February 2017 and moved to the Belvedere in Vienna, where it was seen from 24 February through 18 June 2017. Its final venue was London's Leighton House Museum (7 July - 29 October 2017.) Trippi co-edited the accompanying 250-page book (published by Prestel) with Prof. Prettejohn, and co-convened (with her and others) a symposium in London devoted to Alma-Tadema in October 2017 (Paul Mellon Centre and Birkbeck Institute of the Moving Image).

Before arriving at the Dahesh Museum, Trippi held positions at the Brooklyn Museum, Baltimore Museum of Art, Association of Art Museum Directors (where he wrote a history of that organization from 1916 to 1991), Cooper-Hewitt Museum, National Arts Education Research Center at New York University, and American Arts Alliance in Washington, D.C. He holds an MA in Art History from the Courtauld Institute of Art, London; an MA in Visual Arts Administration from New York University; and a BA in History and Art History from the College of William and Mary, Virginia. His 250-page biography of the British painter J. W. Waterhouse R.A. (1849–1917) was published by Phaidon Press (London) in 2002, and has sold more than 50,000 copies. He contributed two chapters to the catalogue accompanying the exhibition "A Grand Design: The Art of the Victoria and Albert Museum" (1997, organized by the Baltimore Museum of Art and published by Abrams). In 2002, Trippi co-founded, with Professor Petra ten-Doesschate Chu (Seton Hall University) and Professor Gabriel P. Weisberg (University of Minnesota), the peer-reviewed journal Nineteenth-Century Art Worldwide, and he has served on the boards of the Association of Historians of Nineteenth-Century Art, Historians of British Art, and American Friends of Attingham. In 2011 he completed a three-year term as chair of the Courtauld Institute of Art's U.S. Alumni program, and became president of Historians of British Art. In 2013 he became past president of HBA and became president of the Association of Historians of Nineteenth-Century Art.

Trippi operates his own firm, Projects in 19th-Century Art, organizing exhibitions, writing articles, essays, and catalogues, and lecturing widely. He guest co-curated (with Elizabeth Prettejohn, Robert Upstone, and Patty Wageman) a popular touring retrospective of J. W. Waterhouse that visited the Groninger Museum, Royal Academy of Arts, and Montreal Museum of Fine Arts (2008–2010) and was accompanied by a catalogue honored in February 2011 by Historians of British Art as the best in its category. Recent lecturing/moderating venues have included the College Art Association, Christie's, Royal Academy of Arts, Florence Academy of Art, Grand Central Academy, Oil Painters of America, Bard Graduate Center, Grolier Club, and International Fine Print Dealers Association.
