= Handsome (Kilburn and the High-Roads album) =

Studio album by Kilburn and the High Roads
- Released: June 1975
- Recorded: 1974
- Studios: Pye Studios, London
- Genre: Rock
- Length: 40:10
- Label: Dawn (Pye)
- Producer: Hugh Murphy

Kilburn and the High Roads chronology
Handsome (1975)	Wotabunch! (1977)

Ian Dury chronology
Handsome (1975)	New Boots and Panties!! (1977)

Singles from Handsome
- 1. "Rough Kids" Released: November 1974; 2. "Crippled with Nerves" Released: February 1975

Professional ratings
Review scores
Source	Rating
AllMusic	4/5 stars
Record Collector	3/5 stars

Handsome is the debut studio album of the Ian Dury rock group Kilburn and the High Roads, released in June 1975 by Dawn Records.

The band had apparently originally wanted to call the album No Hand Signals, but the idea was rejected by Dawn. The photo on the back cover displayed a Chuck Berry style duckwalk, which is said to be the inspiration for the Madness group's 'nutty train' on the front cover of their album (and single) One Step Beyond....

== Track listing ==
=== Original album ===
All tracks are written by Ian Dury and Russell Hardy, except where indicated.

No.	Title	Writer(s)	Length
1.	"The Roadette Song"		3:25
2.	"Pam's Moods"		3:40
3.	"Crippled with Nerves"		3:45
4.	"Broken Skin"	Dury, Rod Melvin	2:16
5.	"Upminster Kid"		5:18
6.	"Patience (So What?)"		3:13
7.	"Father"	Dury, Charles Sinclair	2:00
8.	"Thank You Mum"	Dury, Melvin	1:21
9.	"Rough Kids"		2:26
10.	"The Badger and the Rabbit"		3:56
11.	"The Mumble Rumble and the Cocktail Rock"		4:39
12.	"The Call-Up"		4:07

Pye-Dawn re-released the original LP in 1977 following the success of Ian Dury as a solo artist.

=== 1999 edition ===
In 1999, as part of their 30th Anniversary series, Dawn re-issued the album onto CD in a very unconventional way; instead of adding bonus tracks to the end of the album or on a second disc, Dawn decided to reorganise the album's track order to accommodate the missing B-sides as well as adding four previously unreleased tracks. These included a cover version of Alma Cogan's "Twenty Tiny Fingers", one of only two cover versions Ian Dury has ever officially released, the other being "Girls (Watching)" on his 1980 album Lord Upminster.

No.	Title	Writer(s)	Length
1.	"Rough Kids" (single version)		2:26
2.	"Billy Bentley (Promenades Himself in London)"	Dury, Charlie Hart	3:02
3.	"Crippled with Nerves"		3:45
4.	"Huffety Puff"		3:14
5.	"The Roadette Song"		3:25
6.	"Pam's Moods"		3:40
7.	"Broken Skin"	Dury, Melvin	2:16
8.	"Upminster Kid"		5:18
9.	"Patience (So What?)"		3:13
10.	"Father"	Dury, Sinclair	2:00
11.	"Thank You Mum"	Dury, Melvin	1:21
12.	"The Badger and the Rabbit"		3:56
13.	"The Mumble Rumble and the Cocktail Rock"		4:39
14.	"The Call Up"		4:07
15.	"Who's to Know?"	Dury, Melvin	2:18
16.	"Back to Blighty"	Dury, Melvin	4:13
17.	"O.K. Roland"	Dury, Hart	2:55
18.	"Twenty Tiny Fingers" (Sore Throat Mix)	Sid Tepper, Roy Bennett	3:16

- Track 1, 2 from the single "Rough Kids"
- Tracks 3, 5–14 from the original LP Handsome
- Track 4 from the single "Crippled with Nerves"
- Tracks 15–18 previously unreleased

=== 2016 edition ===
In 2016, Cherry Red Records released an expanded edition of Handsome with a bonus disc containing a previously unreleased 1974 Capital Radio broadcast. The first disc includes both the single and album version of "Rough Kids".

Disc 1

- As per 1999 edition, adding "Rough Kids" (album version) as track 12 (between "Thank You Mum" and "The Badger and the Rabbit")

Disc 2

In session - Sarah Ward & Friends Capital Radio Fri 26th/Sat 27th April 1974
No.	Title	Writer(s)	Length
1.	"Upminster Kid"
2.	"The Walk"	Jimmy McCracklin, Bob Garlic
3.	"The Roadette Song"
4.	"Crippled with Nerves"
5.	"The Call-Up"
6.	"Pam's Moods"
7.	"Billy Bentley"	Dury, Hart
8.	"The Old Bang"
9.	"You're More Than Fair"
10.	"Rough Kids"
11.	"The Mumble Rumble and the Cocktail Rock"

== Personnel ==
Kilburn and the High Roads

- Ian Dury – vocals
- Keith Lucas – guitar
- Charles Sinclair – electric bass
- Rod Melvin – piano; vocals on "Broken Skin" and "Thank You Mum"
- David Newton-Rohoman – drums
- Davey Payne – saxophone, flute

Additional musicians

- Russell Hardy – keyboards on 1974 Capital Radio broadcast
- Louis Larose or George Butler – drums on 1974 Capital Radio broadcast

Technical

- Hugh Murphy – producer, arrangements
- Chris Thomas – producer on "Rough Kids" (single version) and "Billy Bentley (Promenades Himself in London)"
- Larry Bartlett – engineer
- Phil Chapman – engineer
- Elizabeth Rathmell – front cover painting "The Kilburns Near Tower Bridge"
- Gordon House – graphics
- Poundcake – photography

== First mixes ==
In 1996, Repertoire Records released a 2-CD Ian Dury retrospective Ian Dury & The Blockheads: Reasons to Be Cheerful which included tracks from all of his solo albums and many of his solo singles but instead of including tracks from either Handsome or Wotabunch! they chose to include 10 tracks recorded in 1974 which they claim are the first mixes for some of the tracks from Handsome. However, the version of "Rough Kids" is almost identical to the version on Wotabunch! (minus the ad-libs), and furthermore their time of recording suggests it is possible the tracks are in fact from the Raft recordings, regardless the ten tracks are "Rough Kids", "You're More Than Fair", "Billy Bentley", "Pam's Moods", "Upminster Kid", "The Roadette Song", "Pam's Moods 2", "The Call-Up" and the wrong titled "The Mumble Rumble" ("The Mumble Rumble and the Cocktail Rock"). "Pam's Moods 2" is another mix of "Pam's Moods".

These tracks show little signs of the smooth, softened, high-produced versions finally released on Handsome and are far similar to the band's live sound and are not mentioned at all in either Ian Dury autobiography and noticeably included "You're More Than Fair", which was not included on the final album.
