= Cathie Pilkington =

British sculptor

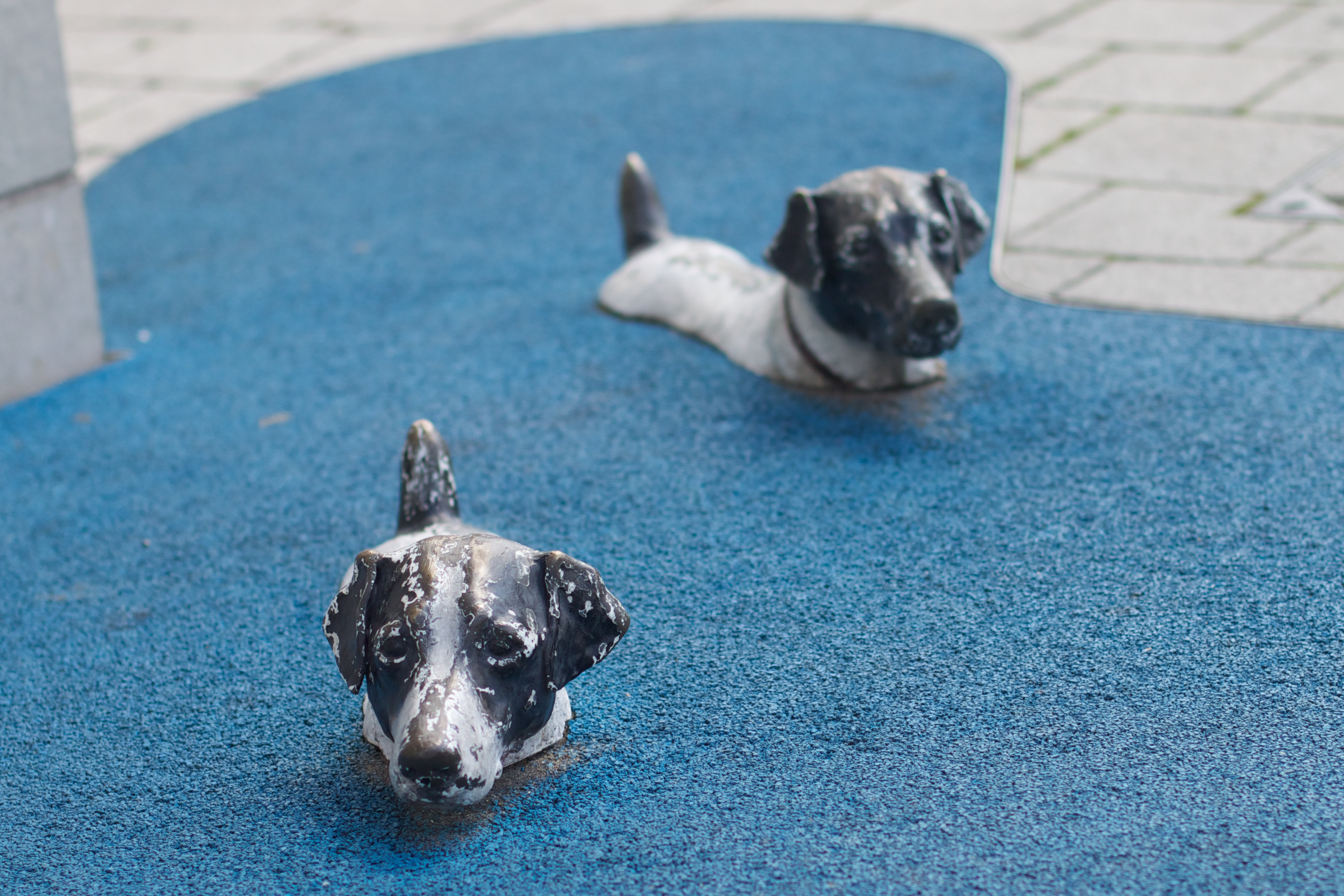
Bill and Bob, Millennium Square, Bristol

Cathie Suzzanne Pilkington RA (born 31 July 1968) is a London-based British sculptor represented by Karsten Schubert London. She studied at Edinburgh College of Art and the Royal College of Art, and was elected as a Royal Academician in 2014. She became professor of sculpture at the Royal Academy Schools in 2016.

== Early life and education ==
Pilkington was born in Manchester, England. She attended the art foundation course at North Cheshire College in Warrington (now part of the University of Chester), then went on to study silversmithing at Edinburgh College of Art from 1986. She graduated with a BA in 1991, with first-class honours, and in the same year was awarded the first John Watson Prize for Art. She also taught in America and India in 1989–1990. She exhibited with the Bruton Gallery in Bath from 1992, and was part of the first Royal West of England Academy Open Sculpture Exhibition in 1993. Pilkington studied at the Royal College of Art in London from 1995, gaining an MA in sculpture in 1997; she was subsequently awarded the Cheltenham Fine Art Fellowship.

== Career ==
In 1999, Pilkington's sculpture Bill and Bob, depicting two Jack Russell Terriers swimming in a pool, was installed in Millennium Square in Bristol. This was Pilkington's first commission for a public space, The two dogs are rendered in painted bronze and set in a pool of vivid blue rubber, flush with the square's paving.

Pilkington's "amusing and ambiguously sentimental sculptures" were included in the three-person show Off the Leash at the Graves Art Gallery in Sheffield in 2003, the same year that her Homunculus (2003), a miniature painted fibreglass manikin of a boy, was displayed outside the headquarters of The Economist magazine in London. At the time she was based in London as a lecturer at Camberwell College of Arts. In 2012, her solo exhibition entitled The Value of the Paw was held at the V&A Museum of Childhood in Bethnal Green, London.

Pilkington was elected as a Royal Academician in 2014, and was awarded the Sunny Dupree award for her work Reclining Doll (2013) Referencing the reclining figures of Henry Moore, Pilkington's interest in using shop windows and modes of display, and in using dolls and manikins in her work, is evident here: as she says, "The doll is a perfect object to put lots of ideas into" . In 2017, after being appointed Professor of Sculpture at the Royal Academy Schools, Pilkington created the project Anatomy of a Doll, in which she placed ballet-dancer figures, derived from those in the work of Edgar Degas, distorted and apparently in the process of being sculpted, in the Life Room of the Royal Academy Schools. her Surrealist approach to the figure was shared with participants in the project 'Exquisite Corpse' which she invited members of the public to attend classes based on the work.She says of her engagement with the female form: 'I am consciously joining in with the objectification of the female form, but on my own terms, and with glee'

For the Brighton Festival in 2017 Pilkington created Life Rooms and engaged with the work of British artist Eric Gill, co-curating the exhibition Eric Gill: The Body, with Cathie Pilkington which featured work by Gill and her own work, Doll for Petra, inspired by a doll made by Gill for his daughter, at Ditchling Museum of Art and Craft, Sussex.

Pilkington chose a doll as the personal item to be included in a portrait drawn from life by fellow Royal Academician Eileen Cooper in 2019; which has since been acquiring by the National Portrait Gallery.

Pilkington's work is held in the collections of the Deste Foundation in Athens, Manchester Art Gallery and the David Roberts Collection in London.

== Exhibitions ==
=== Solo ===
- 2021 Estin Thalassa, Karsten Schubert, London
- 2019 Working From Home, Pallant House Gallery, Chichester
- 2017 Life Room: Anatomy of a Doll, Royal Academy Schools, London
- 2017 The Life Rooms, Brighton University Gallery, lead visual artist at Brighton Festival
- 2017 Doll for Petra, Ditchling Museum of Art & Craft, Ditchling
- 2014 Thing-Soul, Marlborough Fine Art, London
- 2012 The Value of the Paw, V&A Museum of Childhood, Bethnal Green, London
- 2010 Peaceable Kingdom, Marlborough Fine Art, London
- 2009 Toby Jugs and other works, Space Station 65, London
- 2007 White Elephant, Marlborough Fine Art, London
- 2005 Garden, Program, London
- 2004 I’m a Winner! The Apartment, Athens
- 2004 Curio, Space Station 65, London
- 2003 Homunculus, The Economist Plaza, London
- 2000 Short Stories, Galway Arts Centre, Ireland
- 1998 Viva Chihuahua! Prema, Uley, Gloucestershire
- 1991 John Watson Prize, Gallery of Modern Art, Edinburgh

=== Group ===
- 2015 Thirteen Blackbirds Looked at a Man, Chapter Arts Centre, Cardiff
- 2012 Never Promised Pound Land, No Format Gallery, Woolwich, London
- 2010 Bedizzened, APT London
- 2008 That's Entertainment, Whitstable Biennale, Kent
- 2008 Arque Chiado, Lisbon, Portugal
- 2007 The Craft, Transition Gallery, London
- 2006 The Craft, The Metropole Gallery, Folkestone
- 2005 Engerland! OneOtwo, The Tea Buildings, London
- 2003 Emporium, Domo Baal, London
- 2003 Off the Leash, Graves Art Gallery, Sheffield
- 2001 For the Love of Dog, Battersea Pumphouse Gallery
- 2001 Auras and Avatars, The First Public School, Hydra, Greece
- 1999 Rover, Manchester City Art Gallery
- 1999 Medway Open, Rochester Art Gallery
- 1998 False Economy, Gasworks. London
- 1998 Viva Chihuahua! The Tannery, London

== Awards ==
- 2014 Elected Royal Academician, Royal Academy of Arts, London
- 2016 Appointed Professor of Sculpture, Royal Academy Schools, London
- 2014 Sunny Dupree Award, Royal Academy of Art, London
- 1997 Fine Art Fellowship, Cheltenham
