= The Shutov Assembly =

Studio album by Brian Eno
- Released: 9 November 1992
- Recorded: 1985–1990
- Genres: Ambient, dark ambient
- Length: 57:04
- Labels: Warner (Opal); All Saints (re-issue)
- Producer: Brian Eno

Brian Eno chronology
Nerve Net (1992)	The Shutov Assembly (1992)	Neroli (1993)

Professional ratings
Review scores
Source	Rating
AllMusic	3/5 stars
Drowned in Sound	7/10
Pitchfork	5.8/10
PopMatters	9/10
Q	3/5 stars
Rolling Stone	3.5/5 stars
Tom Hull – on the Web	B−
Uncut	3/5 stars

The Shutov Assembly is the twelfth solo studio album by Brian Eno, released on 9 November 1992 on Opal via Warner Bros. Records. One of Eno's ambient albums, it was reissued in 2014 with a second disc with bonus tracks. It is considered the follow-up to Nerve Net, which was released that same year.

== Overview ==
The album is dedicated to Russian artist Sergei Shutov, and was created as an assembly of tracks for him, as he had mentioned to Eno the difficulty he had of getting Eno's music in the then-communist Russia.

Shutov is a Russian painter who I know in Moscow, and a while ago he gave me a painting as a present. He uses my music in his studio a lot; he's got a little blaster there, and plays my music as he's working. So I thought I’d put together a tape for him of unreleased pieces from the past few years. I kept a copy of the tape, and when I started playing it I started to enjoy it and see a thread running through the pieces that I hadn't really seen before. They’d never been put together before, you see.

On the rear cover of the CD, the ten tracks of nine letters are arranged in a grid as seen in a word search puzzle.

- Triennale – Milan festival where Eno had an installation in 1985.
- Alhondiga – Spanish installation in 1988.
- Markgraph – German exhibition music & light company that helps with installations.
- Lanzarote – Canary Islands, host to a yearly music festival. Originally released as "Glint (East of Woodbridge)" on flexi disc in ARTFORUM Magazine, 1986.
- Francisco – Installation at the Exploratorium in 1988.
- Riverside – Riverside Studios in London was the site of a 1986 installation.
- Innocenti – 1987 Florence installation (In Harmonic Space).
- Stedelijk – Amsterdam museum with the video installation of Mistaken Memories of Mediaeval Manhattan.
- Ikebukuro – Tokyo installation in 1989.
- Cavallino – Venice gallery with 1985 installation

The album's Rykodisc entry describes it as "a journey through Eno's sumptuous audio-visual installations from around the world, each track touching down on a particular event and atmosphere."

== Track listing ==
1. "Triennale" – 4:02
2. "Alhondiga" – 3:16
3. "Markgraph" – 3:39
4. "Lanzarote" – 8:37
5. "Francisco" – 4:44
6. "Riverside" – 3:50
7. "Innocenti" – 4:19
8. "Stedelijk" – 5:26
9. "Ikebukuro" – 16:05
10. "Cavallino" – 3:06

2014 reissue's bonus disc

1. "Eastern Cities" – 4:32
2. "Empty Platform" – 4:29
3. "Big Slow Arabs" – 4:39
4. "Storm" – 6:29
5. "Rendition" – 5:15
6. "Prague" – 2:39
7. "Alhondiga Variation" – 6:33

== The music ==
Talking to Mojo magazine in 1998, Eno explained that The Shutov Assembly tracks were originally proposals for orchestral pieces. The Netherlands Metropole Orkest played two performances of the music in June 1999, orchestrated by Steve Gray, at the Holland Festival, which ran from 5 to 26 June in Amsterdam, the first of which was broadcast live on Dutch radio.

Though the music can certainly be classified amongst his other ambient works, most of the compositions have a certain "dark" feel to them. In an interview, Eno said "it's the association with danger that I didn't use to like, and it's exactly that, what I do like now".

== Credits ==
- Brian Eno – all instruments
- Recorded at The Wilderness Studio, Woodbridge, UK
- Mastering by Tony Cousins at the Townhouse, London
- The cover art is an image from the video painting Egypt by Eno and Greg Jakobek.

== Release history ==
Country	Label	Cat. No.	Media	Release date
US	Opal/Warner Bros	9-45010-2	CD	10 November 1992
US	Rykodisc/All Saints	42/HNCD 1478	CD	2004
US	Hannibal	1478	CD	28 June 2005
