= MaryAnne Stevens =

British art historian and curator (born 1947)

- Born: MaryAnne Victoria Stevens; April 1947 (age 78)
- Occupations: art historian and curator

MaryAnne Victoria Stevens (born April 1947) is a British art historian and curator. From 2005 to 2007, she was secretary of the Royal Academy.

In 2005, Stevens succeeded Lawton Fitt as secretary of the Royal Academy.

In 2013, Stevens left the Royal Academy, after working there for 29 years.
