= Sergei Shutov =

Russian artist (born 1955)

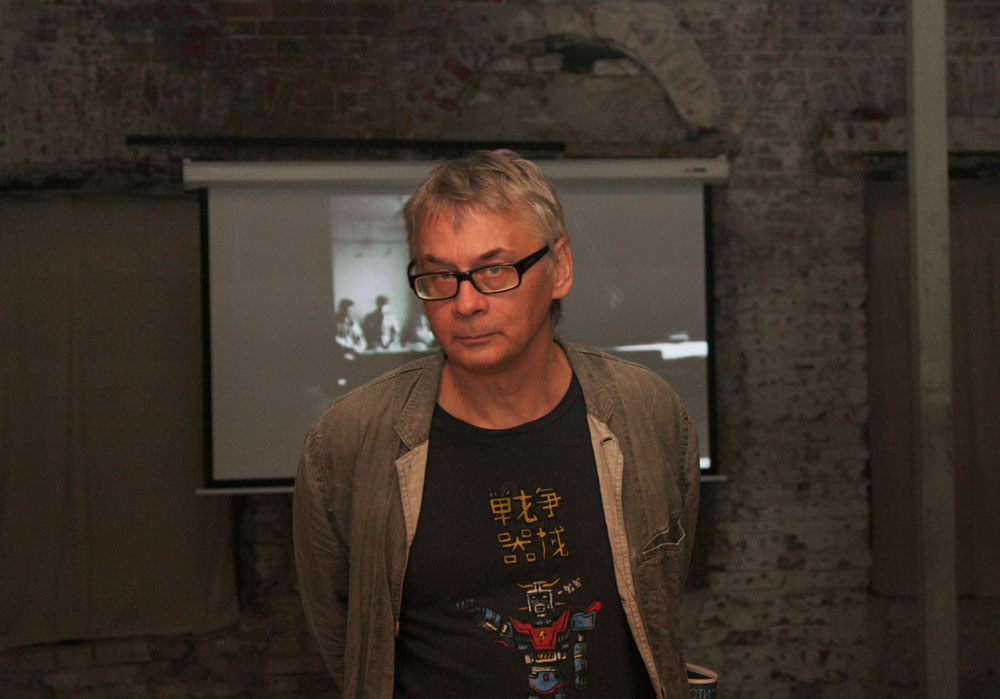
Sergey Shutov is a Russian installation artist and art worker

Sergei Alekseyevich Shutov (also spelled Sergey; Russian: Сергей Алексеевич Шутов, born 1955) is a Russian artist active in painting, drawing, sculpture, photography, and audio- and video installations. He lives and works in Moscow.

He was born in Potsdam, then East Germany. He is a member of numerous arts organizations in Russia, including the Hermitage Association and the Mayakovsky Friends' club. Since 1993 he has served as president of the Institute of Technology of Art, and since 1994 he has been the Practical Work Supervisor at Moscow Arts Laboratory New Media. He has worked in the Pushkin Museum, the Museum of the East, and the Moscow Zoo, and read lectures at the Moscow Planetarium. He has worked as a radio DJ (for Stantsiya 106.8) and was the first VJ in Russia, an artist for the magazine Ptyuch, and an actor and artist for the film Assa.

He is also a musician, and composed a soundtrack to the film The Cabinet of Dr. Caligari (with Timur Novikov), and the album 1988. Brian Eno's album The Shutov Assembly is named for him, after the painter gifted a painting to Eno.

In 2001 he represented Russia at the 49th Venice Biennale, with the project Abacus, which consists of forty automated figures, all dressed in black robes.
