= Eileen Cooper =

British artist (born 1953)

Eileen Cooper OBE RA
- Born: 10 June 1953 (age 73); Glossop, Derbyshire, England
- Known for: Painter and printmaker
- Website: eileencooper.co.uk

Eileen Cooper OBE RA (born 10 June 1953) is a British artist, known primarily as a painter and printmaker.

== Early life ==
Cooper was born in Glossop, Derbyshire and attended Ashton-under-Lyne College of Further Education. She went on to study at Goldsmiths College (1971-1974) and the Royal College of Art (1974-1977) gaining an MA in painting.

== Career ==
Between 1977 and 2000 she was visiting lectures at arts schools across the UK including Falmouth School of Art, Leicester College of Art & Design, St Martin’s School of Art, Camberwell College of Arts, and City & Guilds of London Art School. She lectured on Printmaking at the Royal College of Art between 1994 and 2006 and became Head of Printmaking at the Royal Academy Schools in 2005 until 2010.

She was elected a Royal Academician in 2001. From 2010 to 2017, Cooper served as Keeper of the Royal Academy, one of only 4 officers selected from the 80 Royal Academicians, and with primary responsibility for the Royal Academy Schools, thereby becoming the first woman to be elected to this role in the Royal Academy's 250-year history.

In 2017, Cooper curated and co-ordinated the Royal Academy of Arts' 249th annual Summer Exhibition.

After ending her teaching role at the Royal Academy Schools in 2017 Cooper returned to drawing from life and portraiture in particular. Two of the works from this series (one of fellow Royal Academician Cathie Pilkington and the other a self-portrait) were acquired by the National Portrait Gallery.

== Selected exhibitions ==
=== solo ===
- 2019 Personal Space, Huxley-Parlour Gallery, London
- 2018 Under the Same Moon, Letitia Gallery, Beirut, Lebanon
- 2017 Till the Morning Comes, The Fine Art Society, London
- 2017 Eileen Cooper: A Woman's Skin, Wolfson College, University of Cambridge
- 2016 Between the Lines, Galerie MIRO, Prague, Czech Republic
- 2015 Hide and Seek: Work on Paper 1977-2014, Royal Academy of Arts, London (touring to Swindon Museum and Art Gallery; The Mercer Art Gallery, Harrogate)
- 2015 In the Garden, Rabley Drawing Centre, Marlborough, Wiltshire
- 2013 Edge to Edge, Art First, London
- 2012 South Lookout Project, Aldeburgh Beach, Suffolk
- 2010 Collages, Royal Academy of Arts, London
- 2008 Taking Stock: The Printmaking of Eileen Cooper RA, Clifford Chance, London and Liverpool Hope University
- 2000 Raw Material: Eileen Cooper at Dulwich Picture Gallery, Dulwich Picture Gallery, London
- 1999 Second Skin: Eileen Cooper in the 80s and 90s travelling exhibition (Wolverhampton, Nottingham, Eastbourne)
- 1994 Eileen Cooper at Sadlers Wells, Sadlers Wells Theatre, London
- 1992 Drawings, Benjamin Rhodes Gallery, London
- 1986 Castlefield Gallery, Manchester
- 1979 AIR Gallery, London

=== Group ===
- 1997-2018 Regular exhibitor at Summer Exhibition, Royal Academy of Arts, London
- 2018 Sawdust and Sequins: The Art of the Circus, Royal West of England Academy, Bristol
- 2016 Towards Night, curated by Tom Hammick, Towner Art Gallery, Eastbourne
- 2015 She Came to Stay, curated by Aretha Campbell and Lucy Farley, Rook and Raven Gallery, London
- 2015 Good Figures, Mall Galleries, London, Jerwood Gridshell Space, Weald and Downland Open Air Museum
- 2014 Jerwood Drawing Prize 1994-2014: Artist as Selector, Jerwood Gallery, Hastings
- 2012/13 Encounter: The Royal Academy in the Middle East, Doha
- 2012 Encounter: The Royal Academy in Asia, Institute of Contemporary Arts, Singapore
- 2004 The Jerwood Drawing Prize, Jerwood Space, London
- 1993 Contemporary Art at the Courtauld, Courtauld Institute of Art, London
- 1992 The New Patrons: Twentieth Century Art from Corporate Collections, Christie's, London
- 1992 Myth, Dream and Fable, Angel Row Gallery, Nottingham
- 1992 Innocence and Experience, South Bank Centre, London, Manchester Art Gallery, Hull and Glasgow
- 1988 The New British Painting, Contemporary Arts Center, Cincinnati; Chicago Public Library Cultural Center; Haggerty Museum, Milwaukee; South-eastern Center for Contemporary Art, Winston-Salem; Grand Rapids Art Museum, Michigan
- 1986 John Moores, Walker Art Gallery, Liverpool
- 1985 Hand Signals, Ikon Gallery, Birmingham
- 1984 The Image as Catalyst, Ashmolean Museum, Oxford
- 1982, 1983, 1987 Whitechapel Open, Whitechapel Art Gallery, London
- 1980 Women's Images of Men, Institute of Contemporary Art, London
- 1974-76 New Contemporaries, Camden Arts Centre, London

== Selected public collections ==
- Arts Council Collection
- Government Art Collection, UK
- Birmingham Museum & Art Gallery
- Bristol Museum & Art Gallery
- British Museum, London
- Dallas Museum of Art, USA
- Imperial College, London
- Kunsthalle, Nuremberg, Germany
- Manchester Art Gallery
- MIMA, Middlesbrough
- National Portrait Gallery, London
- New Hall Art Collection, Murray Edwards College, University of Cambridge
- Newport Museum and Art Gallery, Wales
- The Open University
- Pallant House Gallery, Chichester
- Royal Academy of Arts, London
- The Royal Collection Trust
- Royal College of Art, London
- Southampton University Hospital NHS Trust
- Swindon Museum and Art Gallery
- The Towner Art Gallery, Eastbourne
- Victoria & Albert Museum, London
- University of Warwick Art Collection
- Lewis Walpole Library, Yale University, Connecticut, USA
- Whitworth Art Gallery, Manchester
- Wolverhampton Art Gallery

== Awards and honours ==
- 2018: Glyndebourne Opera Invited Artist
- 2009 & 2017: Co-ordinator and curator, Royal Academy of Arts Summer Exhibition
- 2016: Appointed Officer of the Order of the British Empire (OBE) for services to the Arts and Arts Education
- 2016: Made Honorary Fellow, Murray Edwards College, University of Cambridge
- 2013: Made Honorary Doctor of Arts, Southampton Solent University
- 2011: Made Honorary Fellow, Royal College of Art, London
- 2011: Elected Keeper of the Royal Academy of Arts, first woman elected to the post since its foundation in 1768
- 2010, 2013: Artist in Residence, Alayrac, Tarn France
- 2008-09: Artist in Residence, Lewisham College, London
- 2006: Made Fellow of the Royal College of Art
- 2002: Made Honorary Member, Royal Society of Painter-Printmakers
- 2001: Elected Royal Academician
- 1999: Arts & Humanities Research Council Award for ceramics
- 1998-99: Artist in Residence Dulwich Picture Gallery, London
- 1992: Staircase project Institute of Contemporary Art, London
- 1982: Purchase Prize, Nuremberg Drawing Triennial

== Publications ==
- Under the Same Moon by Anna McNay, Letitia Gallery, Beirut, 2018
- Eileen Cooper: A Woman's Skin by Meredith M Hale and Philip Lindley, Wolfson College, University of Cambridge, 2017 ASIN B0843RRZCR
- Eileen Cooper: Till the Morning Comes by Michèle Roberts, The Fine Art Society, London, 2017 ISBN 9781907052880
- Eileen Cooper: Between the Lines by Martin Gayford, Royal Academy of Arts, 2015 ISBN 1907533621, 978-1907533624
- Hide and Seek: Work on Paper 1977-2014 by Anna McNay, Royal Academy of Arts, 2015
- The New British Painting by Edward Lucie-Smith, Carolyn Cohen and Judith Higgins, Phaidon, Oxford, 1988
- Contemporary Women Artists by Sister Wendy Beckett, Oxford, 1988 ISBN 0876636911, 978-0876636916
- Trans Avant Garde International: New Painting in Britain by Achille Bonito Oliva, Milan, 1982

== Television and broadcast ==
- In the Studio film by Charlie Paul, 2015
- Art School, Smart School, BBC Radio 4 documentary, produced by Just Radio Ltd, 20 November 2014
- Women Artists interview with Emma Jane Kirby for ‘PM’, BBC Radio 4, 28 August 2014
- What I See Project, film, 2013
- A Story of Eileen Cooper, Artist and Keeper of the Royal Academy’, [www.ladieswhoimpress.com Ladieswholmpress], 17 October 2013
- Woman's Hour, BBC Radio 4, 2012
- Art School Education interview by Alexander Massouras for Tate Library & Archive, 16 September 2010
- Inside Art documentary series, Channel 4, 1994 (BAFTA nominated)
- The Art documentary, BBC Education, 1993
