= Humphrey Ocean =

English artist, born 1951

Humphrey Ocean RA
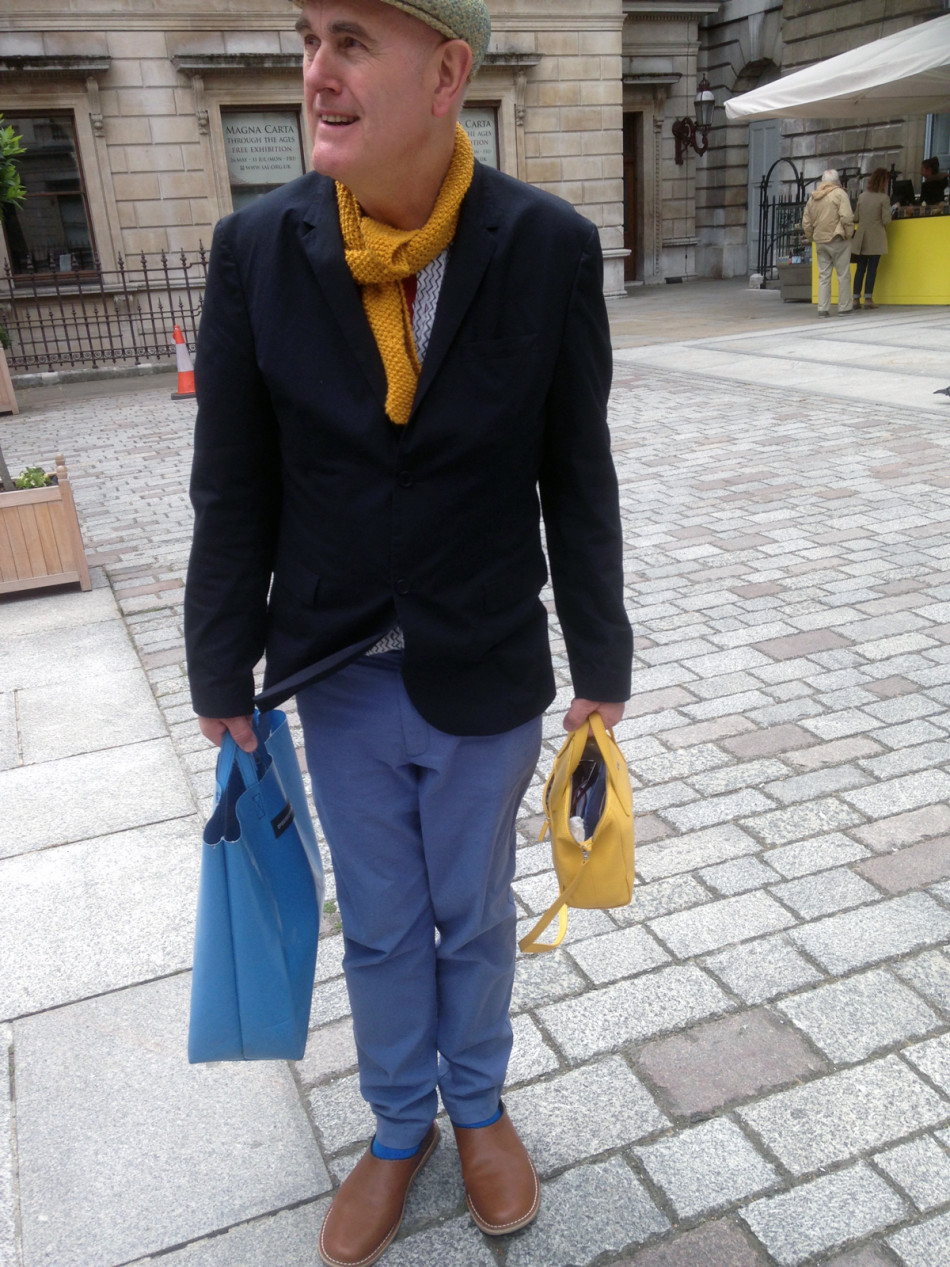
- Born: Humphrey Anthony Erdeswick Butler-Bowdon; 22 June 1951 (age 75); Pulborough, West Sussex, England
- Education: Ampleforth College; Tunbridge Wells School of Art; Brighton College of Art; Canterbury College of Art (1970–73) (DipAD Painting)
- Notable work: Lord Volvo and his Estate (1982); Paul McCartney (1983); Philip Larkin (1984); Black Love Chair (2007); Randy Lerner (2016)
- Spouse: Miranda Argyle
- Elected: Royal Academician (26 May 2004)
- Website: humphreyocean.com

Humphrey Ocean RA (born 22 June 1951) is a contemporary British painter.

== Early life ==
Humphrey Ocean was born Humphrey Anthony Erdeswick Butler-Bowdon, on 22 June 1951 in Sussex. He went to Ampleforth College and in 1967 went to Tunbridge Wells School of Art for two years, going on to do a Foundation Course at Brighton College of Art and DipAD Painting at Canterbury College of Art.

It was at Canterbury that he was taught by Ian Dury, then a painter. From 1971 he was bass player with the band Kilburn and the High Roads formed at Canterbury with Dury. They opened for The Who on its Christmas tour in 1973, after which Ocean resigned from music with the notable exception of recording the single "Whoops-a-Daisy" written by Ian Dury and Russell Hardy, for Stiff Records in 1978.

== Art ==
Ocean's earliest notable work was for record album covers and sleeves; in particular, he contributed pencil drawings for the cover and lyric insert for 10cc's 1975 album The Original Soundtrack, and inner-sleeve art for Paul McCartney and Wings' 1976 album Wings at the Speed of Sound.

In 1983, Ocean painted Paul McCartney's portrait as part of the first prize in the 1982 Imperial Tobacco Portrait Award with his painting Lord Volvo and his Estate and the following year painted the poet Philip Larkin's portrait, also for the National Portrait Gallery, a work described by the novelist Nick Hornby as "unanswerable".

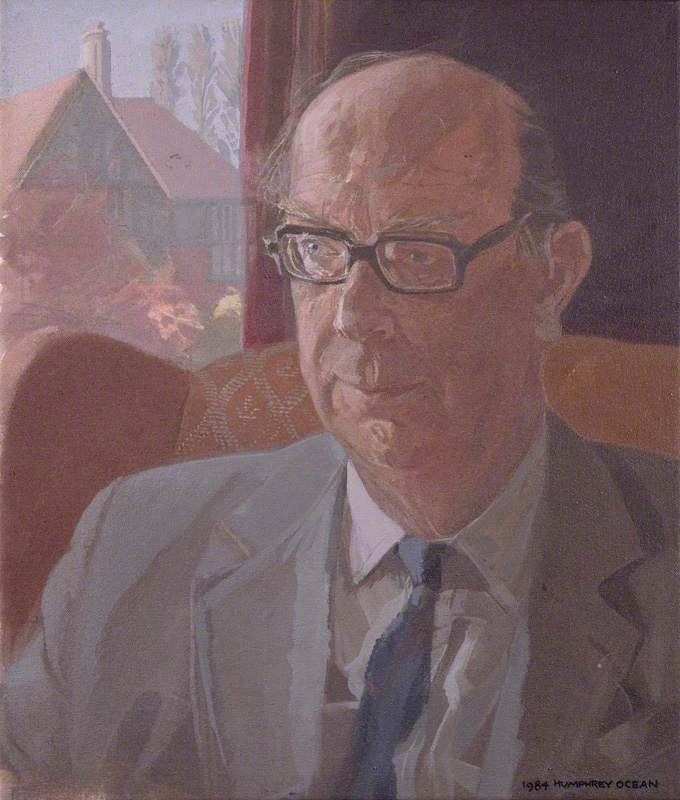
Philip Larkin, acrylic on canvas, 1984, Humphrey Ocean (NPG 5746)

In 1988 Ocean travelled to Northern Brazil with the American anthropologist Stephen Nugent, a lecturer at the University of London, eager to expose colonial caricatures of the region. Their subsequent book, Big Mouth: The Amazon Speaks, was published by Fourth Estate (HarperCollins) in 1990, and features evocative illustrations of Brazil. In 1999 the National Maritime Museum commissioned Ocean to paint a picture of modern maritime Britain. Throughout the 1990s and the early years of the twenty-first century, Ocean's paintings were exhibited in many of the leading museums in the United Kingdom.

In 2002, Ocean was Artist-in-Residence at the Dulwich Picture Gallery, culminating in how's my driving, an exhibition linking 17th-century Dutch genre paintings with south London suburbia. That year he was awarded an honorary fellowship by Canterbury College of Art where he had been a student between 1970-1973. In 2009 he worked on an Artangel project Life Class: Today's Nude directed by Alan Kane, shown on Channel 4 television. He also painted Catherine Hughes in her role as principal of Somerville College, Oxford.

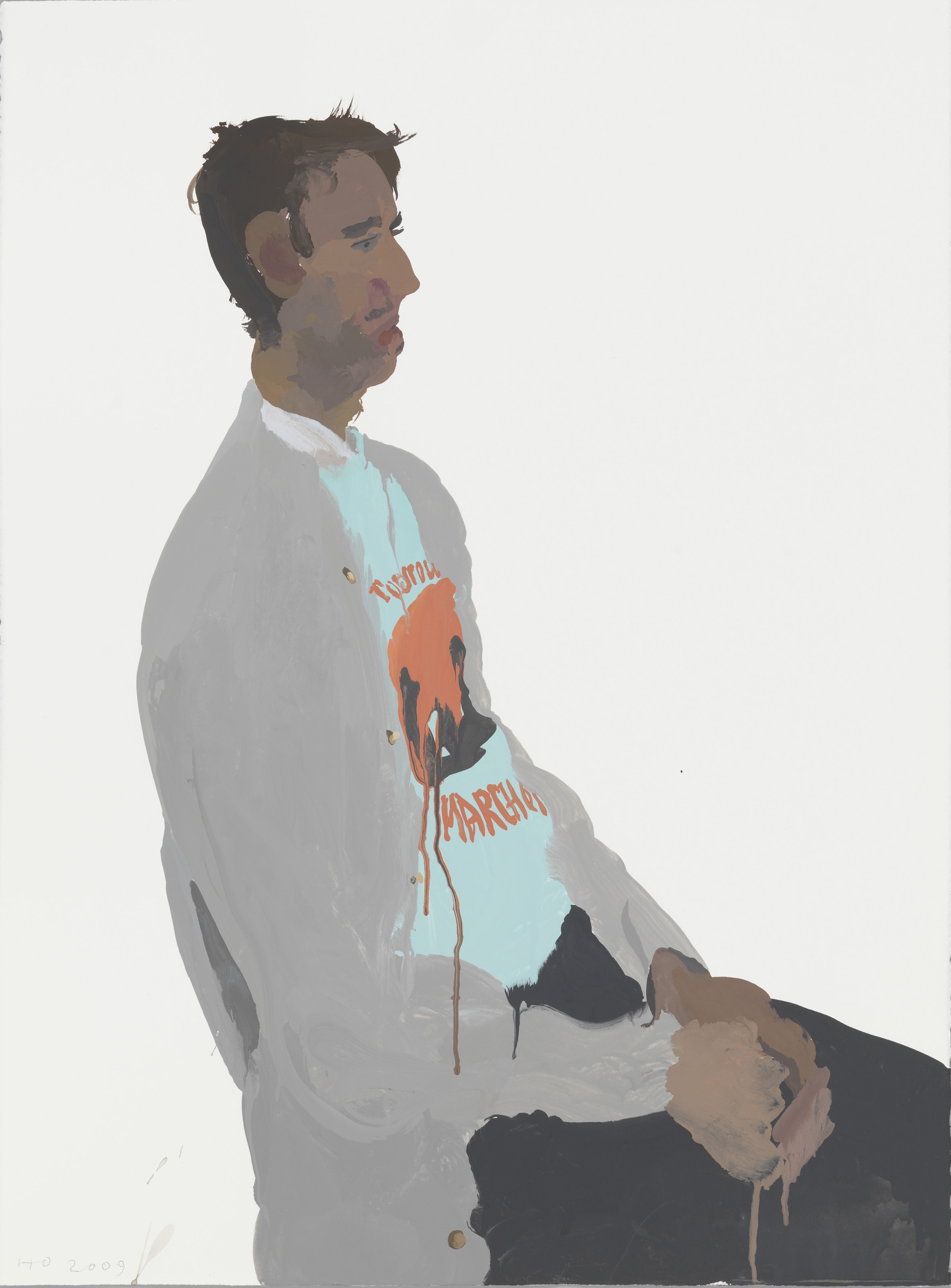
Gabor, gouache on paper, 2009 Humphrey Ocean

=== A handbook of modern life ===
Ocean came to prominence with his exhibition A handbook of modern life (2012–13) at the National Portrait Gallery London curated by Rosie Broadley who wrote:

"Working swiftly in gouache on large sheets of paper in his studio, Ocean paints his sitters, including family members, friends and professional acquaintances, in simple forms and bold colours. The project has an obsessive character that is compelling and, when seen together, the portraits are an exuberant display of the artist's love of painting, colour and people. The sitters have shared the experience of sitting for a portrait, but Ocean has illuminated something unique about each person-how they tilt their head or how they wear their shirt - with an immediacy that tethers the image to the day they visited the studio."

=== Etching ===
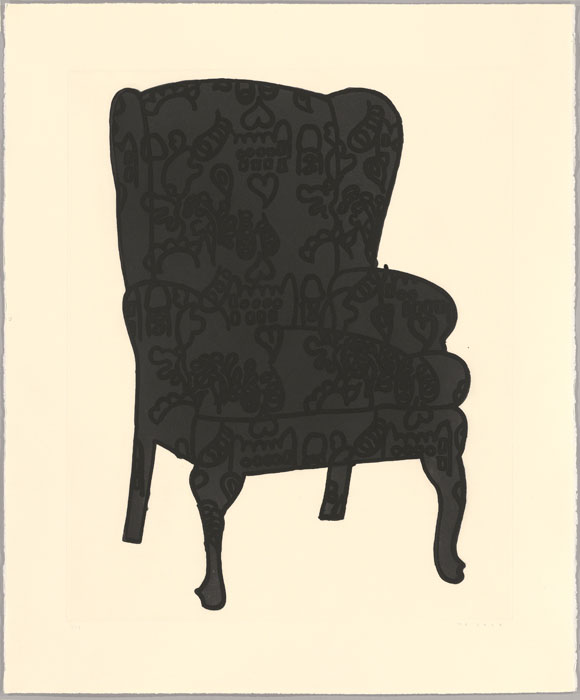
Black Love Chair, aquatint, 2004 Humphrey Ocean

In addition to his portrait of Philip Larkin, he is perhaps best known for his iconic etching, Black Love Chair, which appeared on the cover of Paul McCartney's 2007 album Memory Almost Full. This is an image McCartney chose from the series of etchings begun in 2003 when Ocean was working with Maurice Payne in Miankoma Studio in Amagansett, Long Island.

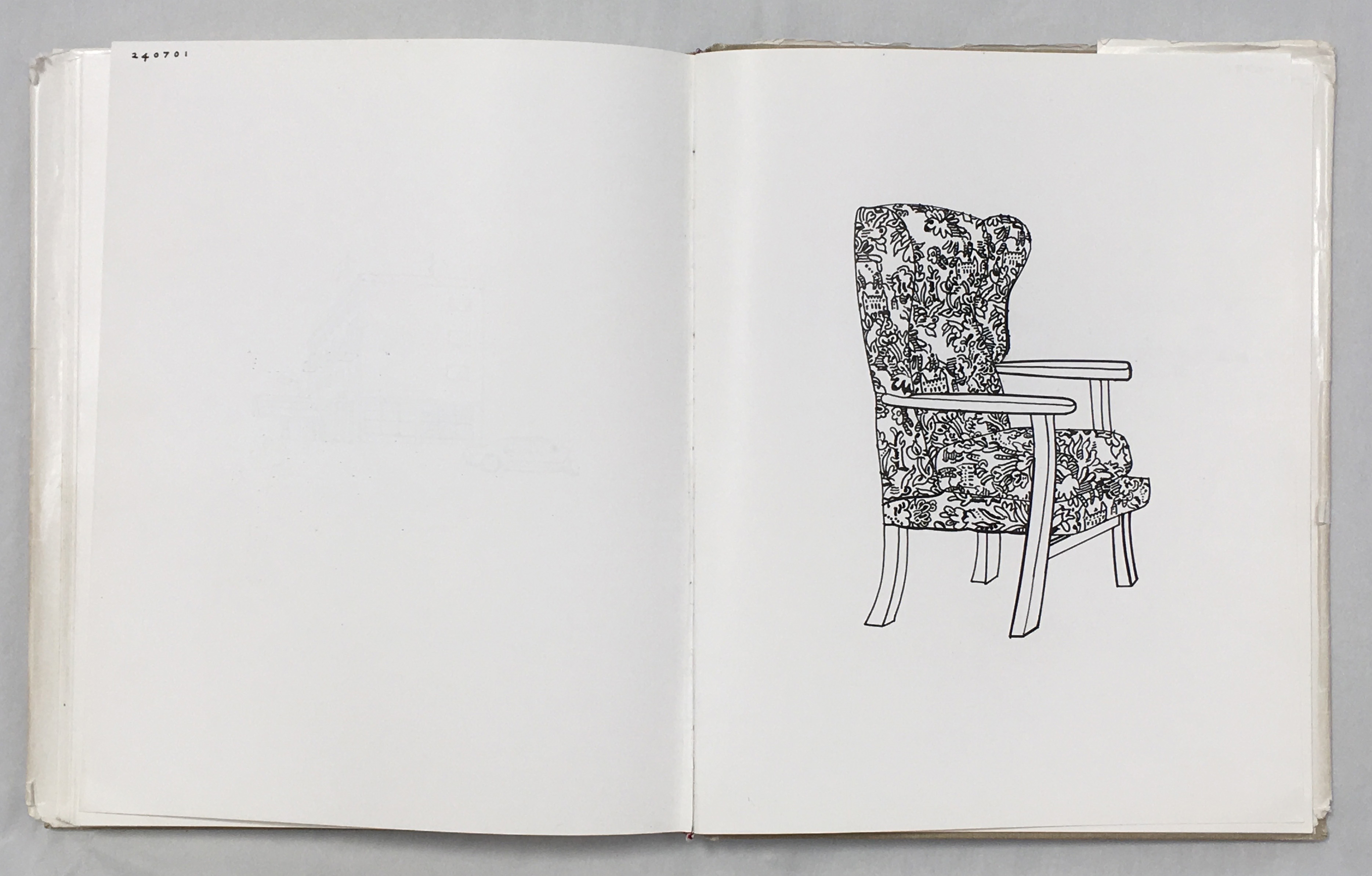
An armchair (page from Dot Book 1999-2001) Humphrey Ocean

=== Dot Books ===
In 2017 Ocean exhibited Dot Book 1 in Drawing Together at the Courtauld Gallery London curated by Dr Ketty Gottardo and Dr Ben Thomas who wrote:

"Humphrey Ocean’s Dot Book also represents a type of artistic wayfaring, on a local scale, as it could be described as recording a notional trip to the supermarket where it becomes ‘impossible to get to Sainsbury’s’ because there are so many arresting motifs to discover along the way which prompt the thought ‘I like that and I want to tell somebody I saw that’. However, this is not a case of taking a line for a walk but of a series of vivid illuminations registered, as it were, at thirty miles an hour through the windscreen of a family estate car. The unremarkable objects, logos and snatched views of corners of suburbia collected together in this album of precise, crisply executed drawings are all 'perfectly ordinary' (to use the title of one of Ocean's exhibitions)."

== Recent ==
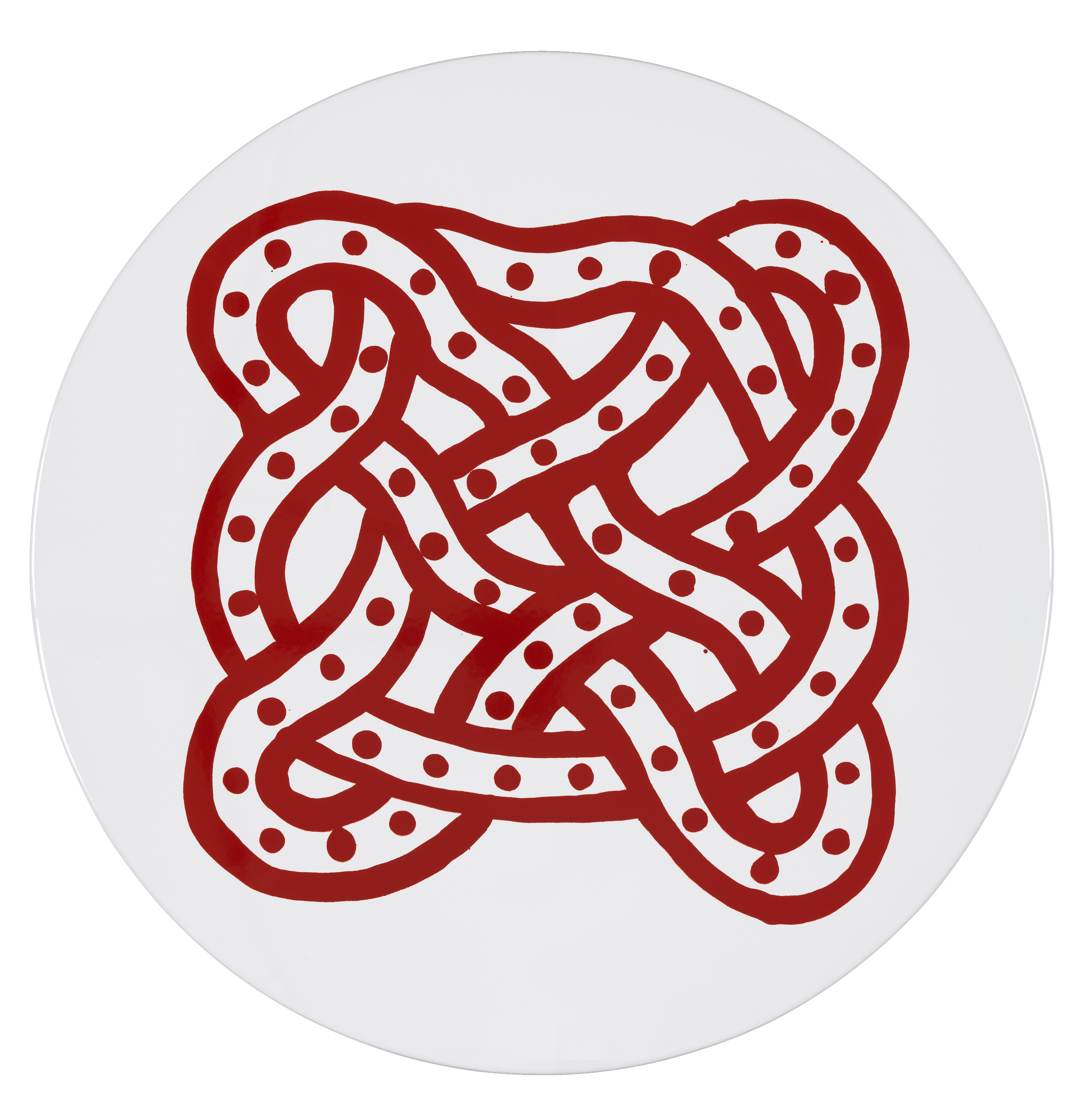
Roadsign, enamel on steel, 2015 Humphrey Ocean (for the 50th Anniversary of the British Road Sign exhibition at the Design Museum)

Ocean was elected a Royal Academician in 2004. He was Royal Academy Professor of Perspective 2012 - 2020, a position once held by J. M. W. Turner.

In 2013 Lord Volvo and his Estate (1982) by Ocean was voted one of 57 of the nation’s favourite paintings and appeared on billboards around Britain in Art Everywhere organised by the Art Fund. In 2014 he completed a portrait of Randy Lerner for the National Portrait Gallery. In the same year he advised on Turner's approach to perspective in Mike Leigh’s film Mr Turner.

He was made an Honorary Doctor by Canterbury Christ Church University in 2012. In 2015 he was made an Honorary Doctor by University of Kent. The same year he designed a road sign for his friend Margaret Calvert for 50th Anniversary of the British Road Sign at the Design Museum. At Christine König Galerie, Vienna he showed in books + papers(2015); Wären Fluss und Meere Tinte (2017); books + papers 2 (2019) and Me, Myself, I (2020).

For BBC Radio 3 he presented The Essay about Impington Village College (2016) and on Radio 4 he featured in Will Gompertz Gets Creative (2015), Only Artists with Mark Alexander (2018) and Start The Week (2019). In 2019 the Royal Academy published a 320 page full colour monograph of his work, written by Dr Ben Thomas. They simultaneously published A Book of Birds by Humphrey Ocean, followed in similar format in 2025 by Humphrey Ocean: Africa. At Eton College in 2022 the exhibition Fresh as Paint was Ocean's personal selection of objects and art from the school collections. In 2022 the British Museum acquired seven works, four of which were displayed in 2023 in New Acquisitions in the Department of Prints and Drawings.

Between 2024 and 2026 he had four utterly different exhibitions: in Peckham, Vienna, Hatton Garden and Sudbury. Also in 2026, he hung Gallery 4 in the Royal Academy’s 258th Summer Exhibition and most recently his painting of a curlew was shown in A Primer of Birds, Cristea Roberts Gallery, London.

Humphrey Ocean is married to artist Miranda Argyle and has two daughters, Ruby and Beatrice. He lives and works in south London.

== Collections ==
His art is featured in several collections, including British Museum, London; Victoria and Albert Museum, London; British Council; The Whitworth, University of Manchester; Wolverhampton Art Gallery; National Portrait Gallery, London; National Galleries Scotland: Portrait, Edinburgh; Government Art Collection.

== Solo exhibitions ==
- 1984: Paul McCartney New Portrait by Humphrey Ocean And Pictures Made on the 1976 Wings Tour, National Portrait Gallery
- 1992: Double-Portrait, Tate Liverpool
- 1997: urbasuburba (with Jock McFadyen), the Whitworth Art Gallery, Manchester
- 1999: The Painter's Eye (with John Tchalenko), National Portrait Gallery, London
- 2003: how's my driving, Dulwich Picture Gallery
- 2006: How do you look (film with John Tchalenko), Hunterian Museum, Royal College of Surgeons of England
- 2009: Perfectly Ordinary, Sidney Cooper Gallery, Canterbury Christ Church University
- 2011: Here and There, Jesus College, Cambridge
- 2012: A handbook of modern life, National Portrait Gallery, London
- 2018: I've No Idea Either, Sims Reed Gallery, London
- 2019: Birds, Cars and Chairs, Keeper's House, Royal Academy of Arts, London
- 2022: Fresh as Paint, Verey Gallery, Eton College
- 2024: That Was Close, DKUK, Peckham, London
- 2024: Das Bild und sein Buch, Christine König Chapter III, Vienna
- 2025: Sometimes I Wonder, Vivienne Roberts Projects, London
- 2025: Home, Gainsborough's House, Sudbury, Suffolk
