= Sidney Hutchison =

British art historian (1912–2000)

Sidney Charles Hutchison (26 March 1912 – 22 April 2000) was a British art historian, Secretary of the Royal Academy from 1968 to 1982.
