= Natasha Mitchell (executive) =

Secretary at the Royal Academy of Arts

Natasha Mitchell is the current Interim Secretary & Chief Executive at the Royal Academy of Arts. She took the interim position after the departure of previous Secretary and Chief Executive of the Royal Academy, Axel Rüger in September 2024.
