= Lawton Fitt =

American banker

- Born: Lawton Wehle Fitt; July 1953 (age 73)
- Education: Brown University (B.A.); University of Virginia (M.B.A.)

Lawton Wehle Fitt (born July 1953) is an American banker.

She completed college at Brown University, majoring in European history. After working in Burkina Faso with the Peace Corps, she studied at the University of Virginia's Darden School of Business.

From 1979 to 2002, Fitt was a banker with Goldman Sachs.

In 2002, Fitt succeeded David Gordon as secretary of the Royal Academy, holding that position until 2005.
