= List of Royal Academicians =

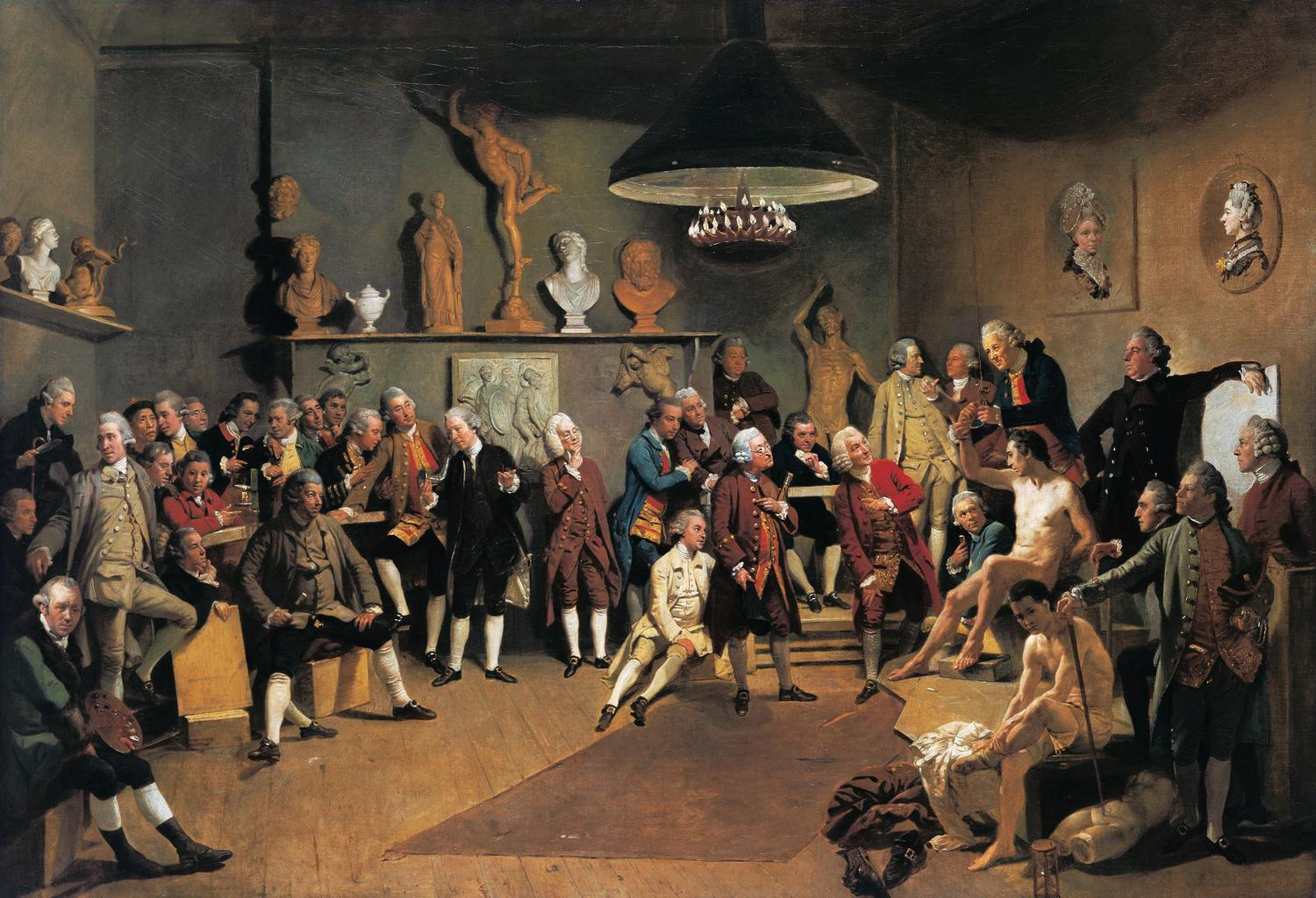
Johan Zoffany, The Academicians of the Royal Academy, 1771–72, Royal Collection.

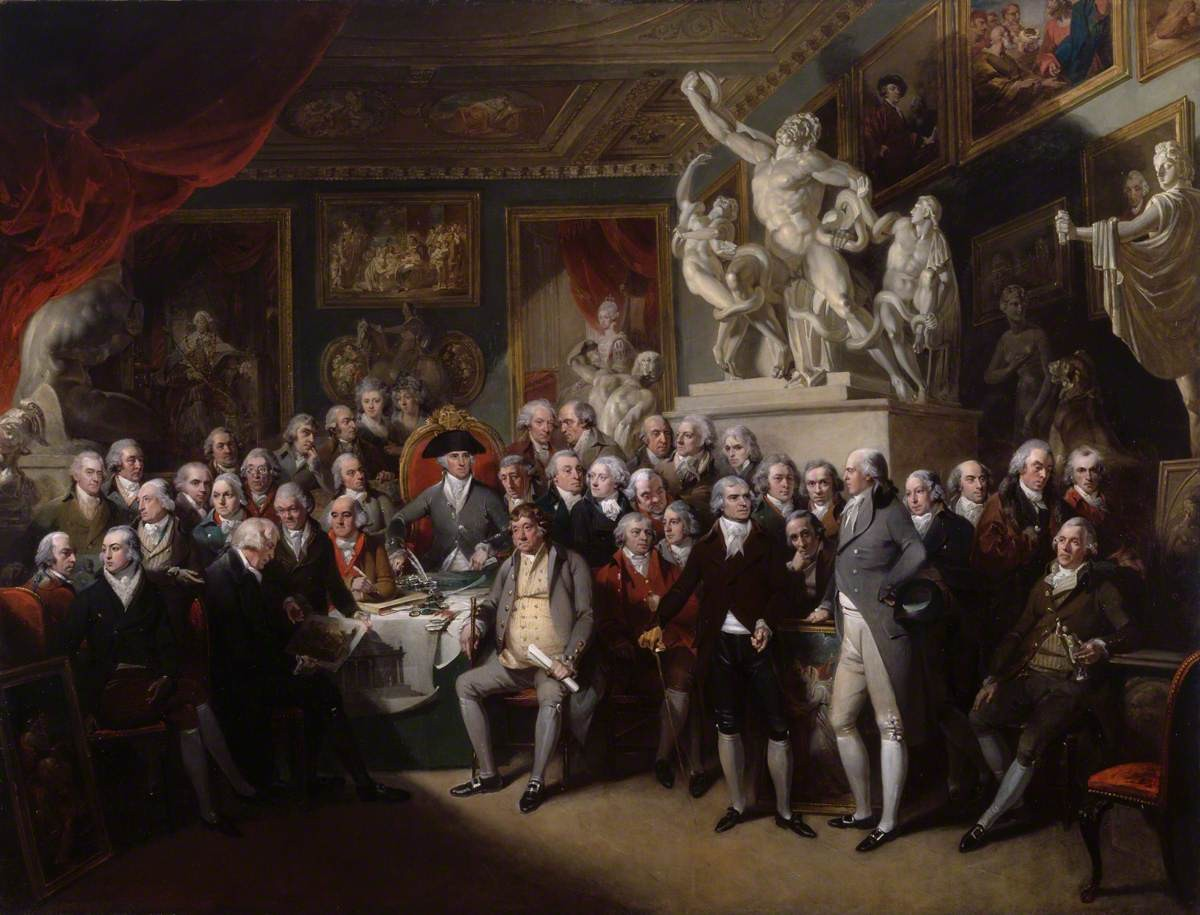
The Royal Academicians in General Assembly by Henry Singleton, 1795

This is a partial list of Royal Academicians (post-nominal: RA), academicians of the Royal Academy of Arts in London. A full list is available on the web pages of the Royal Academy Collections.

Name	Elected	Notes	Ref.
John Baker	1768	Foundation member	
George Barret	1768	Foundation member	
Francesco Bartolozzi	1768	Foundation member	
Agostino Carlini	1768	Foundation member; Keeper 1783–90	
Charles Catton	1768	Foundation member	
Mason Chamberlin	1768	Foundation member	
William Chambers	1768	Foundation member; first Treasurer 1768–96	
Giovanni Battista Cipriani	1768	Foundation member	
Francis Cotes	1768	Foundation member	
George Dance the Younger	1768	Foundation member; Professor of Architecture 1798–1805	
Nathaniel Dance-Holland	1768	Foundation member	
Thomas Gainsborough	1768	Foundation member	
John Gwynn	1768	Foundation member	
Francis Hayman	1768	Foundation member; first Academy librarian 1770–1776	
Nathaniel Hone	1768	Foundation member	
Angelica Kauffman	1768	Foundation member	
Jeremiah Meyer	1768	Foundation member	
George Michael Moser	1768	Foundation member; first Keeper 1768–83	
Mary Moser	1768	Foundation member	
Francis Milner Newton	1768	Foundation member; first Secretary 1768–88	
Edward Penny	1768	Foundation member; first Professor of Painting 1768–82	
Joshua Reynolds	1768	Foundation member; President 1768–92	
John Inigo Richards	1768	Foundation member; Secretary 1788–1810	
Paul Sandby	1768	Foundation member	
Thomas Sandby	1768	Foundation member; first Professor of Architecture 1768–98	
Dominic Serres	1768	Foundation member; Librarian 1792–93	
Peter Toms	1768	Foundation member	
William Tyler	1768	Foundation member	
Samuel Wale	1768	Foundation member; first Professor of Perspective 1768–1786; Librarian 1782–86	
Benjamin West	1768	Foundation member; President 1792–1805 & 1806–20	
Richard Wilson	1768	Foundation member; Librarian 1776–1782	
Joseph Wilton	1768	Foundation member; Librarian 1786–1790; Keeper 1790–1803	
Richard Yeo	1768	Foundation member	
Francesco Zuccarelli	1768	Foundation member	
William Hoare	1769	Nominated member	
Johann Zoffany	1769	Nominated member	
Edward Burch	1771	Librarian 1794–1814	
Richard Cosway	1771		
Joseph Nollekens	1772		
James Barry	1773	Professor of Painting 1782–1799	
Matthew William Peters	1777	Honorary Chaplain 1784–1788	
John Singleton Copley	1779		
John Bacon	1778		
Philip James de Loutherbourg	1781		
George Stubbs	1781		
Edmund Garvey	1783		
John Francis Rigaud	1784		
Thomas Banks	1785		
Joseph Farington	1785		
James Wyatt	1785	President 1805–1806	
William Hodges	1787		
James Northcote	1787		
John Opie	1788	Professor of Painting 1805–1807	
John Russell	1788		
William Hamilton	1789		
Henry Fuseli	1790	Professor of Painting 1799–1805 & 1810–25; Keeper 1804–1825	
Ozias Humphrey	1791		
Francis Wheatley	1791		
John Yenn	1791	Treasurer 1796–1820	
John Webber	1791		
Francis Bourgeois	1793		
Robert Smirke	1793		
Thomas Lawrence	1794	President 1820–30	
Richard Westall	1794		
Thomas Stothard	1794	Librarian 1814–1834	
John Hoppner	1795		
Sawrey Gilpin	1797		
William Beechey	1798	Associate RA: 1793	
Thomas Daniell	1799		
Henry Tresham	1799	Professor of Painting 1807–1809	
John Flaxman	1800	First Professor of Sculpture 1810–26	
Martin Archer Shee	1800	President 1830–50	
John Soane	1802	Professor of Architecture 1806–37	
J. M. W. Turner	1802	Professor of Perspective 1807–37	
Henry Thomson	1804	Keeper 1825–27	
William Owen	1806		
Samuel Woodforde	1807		
Henry Howard	1808	Secretary 1811–47; Professor of Painting 1833–1847	
Thomas Phillips	1808	Professor of Painting 1825–32	
Augustus Wall Callcott	1810		
Henry Bone	1811		
James Ward	1811		
David Wilkie	1811		
Richard Westmacott	1811	Professor of Sculpture 1827–56	
Robert Smirke	1811	Treasurer 1820–50	
Philip Reinagle	1812		
William Theed	1813		
George Dawe	1814		
Edward Bird	1815		
Henry Raeburn	1815		
Alfred Edward Chalon	1816		
John Jackson	1817		
Francis Leggatt Chantrey	1818		
William Hilton	1819	Keeper 1827–39	
William Collins	1820	Librarian 1840–42	
Abraham Cooper	1820		
Edward Hodges Baily	1821		
Richard Cook	1822		
William Daniell	1822		
Ramsay Richard Reinagle	1823		
George Jones	1824	Librarian 1834–1840; Keeper 1840–50	
Jeffry Wyatville	1824		
Charles Robert Leslie	1826	Professor of Painting 1847–52	
Henry William Pickersgill	1826	Librarian 1856–64	
William Wilkins	1826	Professor of Architecture 1837–39	
William Etty	1828		
John Constable	1829		
Charles Lock Eastlake	1830	Librarian 1842–44; President 1850–65	
Edwin Henry Landseer	1831		
William Allan	1835		
Clarkson Stanfield	1835		
Charles Robert Cockerell	1836	Professor of Architecture 1839–59	
John Gibson	1836		
John Peter Gandy	1838		
Frederick Richard Lee	1838		
Thomas Uwins	1838	Librarian 1844–55	
Daniel Maclise	1840		
Solomon Alexander Hart	1840	Professor of Painting 1854–63; Librarian 1864–81	
William Frederick Witherington	1840		
John James Chalon	1841		
Philip Hardwick	1841	Treasurer 1850–61	
David Roberts	1841		
Charles Barry	1842		
William Charles Ross	1843		
John Prescott Knight	1844	Secretary 1847–1873; Professor of Perspective 1852–1860	
Charles Landseer	1845	Keeper 1851–73	
John Rogers Herbert	1846		
Thomas Webster	1846		
Charles West Cope	1848	Professor of Painting 1866–75	
William Dyce	1848		
Richard Westmacott	1849	Professor of Sculpture 1857–68	
John Watson Gordon	1851		
Francis Grant	1851	President 1866–78	
Richard Redgrave	1851		
William Powell Frith	1853		
Samuel Cousins	1855		
Frederick Richard Pickersgill	1857	Keeper 1873–1887	
John Henry Foley	1858		
Sydney Smirke	1859	Treasurer 1861–1874; Professor of Architecture 1860–1865	
Augustus Egg	1860		
George Gilbert Scott	1860	Professor of Architecture 1866–1873	
Edward William Cooke	1863		
William Boxall	1863		
Frederick Goodall	1863		
John Everett Millais	1863	President 1896	
Henry Weekes	1863	Professor of Sculpture 1868–76	
John Callcott Horsley	1864	Treasurer 1882–1897	
Carlo Marochetti	1866		
George Richmond	1866		
Philip Hermogenes Calderon	1867	Keeper 1887–98	
Thomas Sidney Cooper	1867		
George Frederic Watts	1867		
Frederic Leighton	1868	President 1878–96	
Edward Middleton Barry	1869	Professor of Architecture 1873–80; Treasurer 1874–80	
James Sant	1869		
Richard Ansdell	1870		
William Charles Thomas Dobson	1871		
Lumb Stocks	1871		
George Edmund Street	1871	Professor of Architecture 1880–81; Treasurer 1880–81	
Frederick Walker	1871		
Edward Armitage	1872	Professor of Painting 1875–82	
Thomas Woolner	1874	Professor of Sculpture 1877–78	
John Gilbert	1876		
Edward Poynter	1876	President 1896–1918	
William Quiller Orchardson	1877		
Richard Norman Shaw	1877	Treasurer 1882	
Henry Stacy Marks	1878		
William Frederick Yeames	1878	Librarian 1896–1911	
Lawrence Alma-Tadema	1879		
John Evan Hodgson	1879	Librarian 1882–95; Professor of Painting 1882–95	
George Vicat Cole	1880		
Henry Hugh Armstead	1880		
John Loughborough Pearson	1880		
William Burges	1881		
Peter Graham	1881		
Edwin Long	1881		
Walter William Ouless	1881		
Briton Rivière	1881		
Joseph Edgar Boehm	1882		
Frank Holl	1883		
Alfred Waterhouse	1885	Treasurer 1897–1901	
Luke Fildes	1887		
Marcus Stone	1887		
Hamo Thornycroft	1888		
Hubert von Herkomer	1890	Professor of Painting 1899–1900 & 1906–1909	
Thomas Brock	1891		
Frank Dicksee	1891	President 1924–1928	
Andrew Carrick Gow	1891	Keeper 1911–1920; Librarian 1911–1920	
Alfred Gilbert	1892	Professor of Sculpture 1900–1904	
Val Prinsep	1894	Professor of Painting 1900–1903	
Edward Onslow Ford	1895		
William Blake Richmond	1895	Professor of Painting 1895–1899 & 1909–1911	
John William Waterhouse	1895		
Ernest Crofts	1896	Keeper 1898–1911	
Thomas Graham Jackson	1896	Treasurer 1901–1912	
John Singer Sargent	1897		
George Frederic Watts	1897		
Edwin Austin Abbey	1898		
George Aitchison	1898	Professor of Architecture 1887–1905	
Benjamin Williams Leader	1898		
George Frederick Bodley	1902		
George Frampton	1902		
Aston Webb	1903	Treasurer 1912–1919; President 1919–24	
Robert Walker Macbeth	1903		
David Murray	1905		
George Clausen	1908	Professor of Painting 1903–1906	
William Lionel Wyllie	1907		
John Belcher	1909		
Goscombe John	1909		
James Jebusa Shannon	1909		
Arthur Stockdale Cope	1910		
Charles Napier Hemy	1910		
Frank Bramley	1911		
Henry Herbert La Thangue	1912		
Reginald Blomfield	1914	Professor of Architecture 1907–11	
Alfred East	1913		
G.A. Storey	1914	Professor of Perspective 1914–19	
Henry Scott Tuke	1914		
John Arnesby Brown	1915		
Charles Sims	1915	Keeper 1920–26	
Ernest George	1917		
William Robert Colton	1917	Professor of Sculpture 1907–1911	
Frank Brangwyn	1919		
Mark Fisher	1919		
Ernest Newton	1919		
William Orpen	1919		
Adrian Scott Stokes	1919		
David Young Cameron	1920		
Richard Jack	1920		
William Llewellyn	1920	President 1928–1938	
Charles Haslewood Shannon	1920		
Edwin Landseer Lutyens	1920	President 1938–1944	
Robert Anning Bell	1922		
Giles Gilbert Scott	1922		
Bertram Priestman	1923		
Samuel Melton Fisher	1924		
Terrick Williams	1924		
Philip Connard	1925	Keeper 1945–1949	
John James Burnet	1925		
Alfred Munnings	1925	President 1944–1949	
Walter Westley Russell	1926	Keeper 1927–42	
Augustus John	1928		
William Reid Dick	1928		
Gerald Kelly	1930	Keeper 1943–1945; President 1949–1954	
Sydney Lee	1930	Treasurer 1932–40	
Herbert Baker	1932		
George Spencer Watson	1932		
Wilfrid de Glehn	1932		
Henry Macbeth-Raeburn	1933	Associate RA: 1922	
William Russell Flint	1933		
William Curtis Green	1933		
Frank Short	1933	Treasurer 1919–32	
Lamorna Birch	1934		
Frank Cadogan Cowper	1934		
Walter Sickert	1934		
Francis Dodd	1935		
Guy Dawber	1935		
Laura Knight	1936		
Henry Rushbury	1936	Keeper 1949–1964	
Harold Knight	1937		
Edwin Cooper	1937	Treasurer 1940–42	
Frederick William Elwell	1938		
Walter Thomas Monnington	1938	President 1966–76	
Charles Wheeler	1940	President 1956–66	
James Bateman	1942		
Meredith Frampton	1942		
Vincent Harris	1942	Treasurer 1942–54	
Arthur Joseph Davis	1942		
Thomas Cantrell Dugdale	1943		
Algernon Newton	1943		
Albert Richardson	1944	Professor of Architecture 1946–61; President 1954–56	
Charles Cundall	1944		
Edward Maufe	1947	Treasurer 1954–58	
Winston Churchill	1948	Honorary Academician Extraordinary	
Henry Lamb	1949		
Arthur Ralph Middleton Todd	1949		
Stanley Spencer	1950		
John Nash	1951		
Arnold Mason	1951		
Steven Spurrier	1952		
Frank Dobson	1953		
Louis de Soissons	1953	Treasurer 1958–1962	
Richard Eurich	1953		
William Dring	1955		
Hubert Worthington	1955		
Howard Robertson	1958		
Peter Greenham	1960	Keeper 1964–1985	
Basil Spence	1960	Professor of Architecture 1961–1967; Treasurer 1962–1964	
Herbert James Gunn	1961	Treasurer 1964	
Norman Hepple	1961		
Rodney Joseph Burn	1962		
L.S. Lowry	1962		
Donald McMorran	1962	Treasurer 1965	
John Aldridge	1963		
Marshall Sisson	1963	Treasurer 1965–70	
Raymond Erith	1964		
Andrew Freeth	1965	Uncle of Peter Freeth	
Carel Weight	1965		
Henry Carr	1966		
William Roberts	1966		
Raymond Teague Cowern	1968		
Charles Mahoney	1968		
Eric Schilsky	1968		
William Holford	1968	Treasurer 1970–1975	
Roger de Grey	1969	Treasurer 1976–1984; President 1984–1993	
Frederick Gibberd	1969		
Leonard Rosoman	1969		
Willi Soukop	1969		
Hugh Casson	1970	Treasurer 1975–1976; President 1976–1984	
Edward Ardizzone	1970		
Colin Hayes	1970		
John Bratby	1971		
Gertrude Hermes	1971		
Norman Adams	1972	Keeper 1986–1995; Professor of Painting 1986 & 1995–1999	
Ralph Brown	1972		
Jean Cooke	1972		
Maxwell Fry	1972	Professor of Architecture 1967–1975	
Frederick Gore	1972		
Edward Wolfe	1972		
William MacTaggart	1973		
Edward Middleditch	1973	Keeper 1985–1986	
Fred Cuming	1974		
Bryan Kneale	1974	Professor of Sculpture 1985–1989	
Kyffin Williams	1974		
Olwyn Bowey	1975		
Henry Thomas Cadbury-Brown	1975	Professor of Architecture 1975–88	
Ernő Goldfinger	1975		
Elizabeth Blackadder	1976		
Jennifer Dickson	1976		
Elisabeth Frink	1977		
Anthony Green	1977		
Philip Powell	1977	Treasurer 1985–1995	
Sandra Blow	1978		
Leonard Manasseh	1979		
Eduardo Paolozzi	1979		
David Tindle	1979		
Peter Blake	1981	Eranda Professor of Drawing 2002–2004	
William Bowyer	1981		
Sonia Lawson	1982		
Tom Phillips	1984		
Trevor Dannatt	1983	Professor of Architecture 1988–1995	
Michael Rothenstein	1983		
Richard Rogers	1984		
Philip Dowson	1985	President 1993–1999	
Donald Hamilton Fraser	1985		
Leslie Martin	1985		
Ove Arup	1986		
Allen Jones	1986		
Michael Kenny	1986	Treasurer 1995–1999	
Morris Kestelman	1986		
Norman Ackroyd	1988		
Eileen Agar	1988		
Craigie Aitchison	1988		
Phillip King	1988	Professor of Sculpture 1989–1999; President 1999–2004	
Ann Christopher	1989		
Lawrence Gowing	1989	Honorary Curator 1985–1991	
Berthold Lubetkin	1989		
Michael Sandle	1989		
Anthony Whishaw	1989		
Theo Crosby	1990		
Ivor Abrahams	1991	Professor of Sculpture 2007–2010	
Norman Ackroyd	1991	Professor of Printmaking	
Diana Armfield	1991		
Gillian Ayres	1991		
John Bellany	1991		
Edward Cullinan	1991		
Kenneth Draper	1991		
Peter Freeth	1991	Elected ARA: 30 May 1990 Nephew of Andrew Freeth	
Norman Foster	1991		
Paul Huxley	1991	Treasurer 2000–2014	
David Hockney	1991		
Ken Howard	1991	Professor of Perspective 2004–2012	
John Hoyland	1991	Professor of Painting 1999–2010	
Bill Jacklin	1991		
Geoffrey Jellicoe	1991		
R. B. Kitaj	1991		
Paul Koralek	1991		
Denys Lasdun	1991		
Leonard McComb	1991	Keeper 1995–98	
Dhruva Mistry	1991		
Sidney Nolan	1991		
James Stirling	1991		
Joe Tilson	1991		
Colin St John Wilson	1991		
Terry Frost	1992		
Gus Cummins	1992		
William Tucker	1992		
Michael Hopkins	1992		
Brendan Neiland	1992	Keeper 1998–2004	
Richard MacCormac	1993		
Jennifer Durrant	1994		
Mick Moon	1994		
Tony Cragg	1994		
Nicholas Grimshaw	1994	President 2004–11	
Christopher Orr	1995	Treasurer 2014–2018	
John Maine	1995		
Flavia Irwin	1996		
Christopher Le Brun	1996	Eranda Professor of Drawing 2000 – 2002; President 2011–2019	
Patrick Procktor	1996		
Barbara Rae	1996		
Eva Jiřičná	1997		
Albert Irvin	1998	Elected Senior RA: 10 December 1998	
Stephen Farthing	1998		
Richard Deacon	1998		
David Mach	1998	Professor of Sculpture 2000–2007	
Ian Ritchie	1998	Professor of Architecture 2004–2012	
Anish Kapoor	1999		
Alison Wilding	1999	Eranda Professor of Drawing 2018–Present	
Maurice Cockrill	1999	Keeper 2004–2011	
David Nash	1999		
Will Alsop	2000		
Gordon Benson	2000		
Lynn Chadwick	2001		
Eileen Cooper	2001	First female Keeper, 2011 – 2017	
Piers Gough	2001	Professor of Architecture 2013–2017	
Gary Hume	2001	Eranda Professor of Drawing 2004–2006	
Richard Long	2001		
Fiona Rae	2002	Professor of Painting 2011–2015	
Bill Woodrow	2002	Professor of Painting 2011–2015	
Peter Cook	2003		
Antony Gormley	2003		
Nigel Hall	2003		
Ian McKeever	2003		
Anthony Caro	2004		
Humphrey Ocean	2004	Professor of Perspective 2012–2020	
Frank Bowling	2005		
Zaha Hadid	2005		
Lisa Milroy	2005		
Stephen Chambers	2005		
Eric Parry	2006		
Basil Beattie	2006		
Michael Craig-Martin	2006		
David Remfry	2006	Eranda Professor of Drawing 2016–18	
Chris Wilkinson	2006	Treasurer 2018–Present	
Richard Wilson	2006	Professor of Sculpture 2011–15	
David Chipperfield	2007		
Tracey Emin	2007	Eranda Professor of Drawing 2011–13	
Tony Bevan	2007		
John Carter	2007		
Jenny Saville	2007		
Gillian Wearing	2007		
Spencer de Grey	2008		
Tacita Dean	2008		
Michael Landy	2008	Eranda Professor of Drawing 2014–16	
Terry Setch	2009		
Hughie O'Donoghue	2009		
Alan Stanton	2009		
Cornelia Parker	2009		
Tess Jaray	2010		
Mali Morris	2010	Professor of Painting 2019–2020	
Stephen Cox	2010		
Timothy Hyman	2011		
Phyllida Barlow	2011		
Anne Desmet	2011		
Grayson Perry	2011		
Ron Arad	2012		
Sean Scully	2012		
Jock McFadyen	2012		
Thomas Heatherwick	2013		
Chantal Joffe	2013	Professor of Painting 2018–2019	
Mike Nelson	2013	Professor of Sculpture 2019–Present	
Emma Stibbon	2013		
Conrad Shawcross	2013		
Yinka Shonibare	2013		
Tim Shaw	2013		
Neil Jeffries	2013		
Bob and Roberta Smith	2013		
Wolfgang Tillmans	2013		
Louisa Hutton	2014		
Cathie Pilkington	2014	Professor of Sculpture 2015–2019; Keeper 2020-Present	
Rebecca Warren	2014		
Eva Rothschild	2014		
Rose Wylie	2014		
Rebecca Salter	2014	Keeper 2017–2019; President 2019–Present	
Brian Catling	2015		
Farshid Moussavi	2015	Professor of Architecture 2017–Present	
Peter Randall-Page	2015		
Vanessa Jackson	2015		
Roger Zogolovitch	2015	Honorary Surveyor	
Paula Rego	2016		
Sonia Boyce	2016		
David Adjaye	2017		
Fiona Banner	2017	Professor of Perspective 2020–Present	
Isaac Julien	2017		
Gilbert & George	2017	Left the RA in 2020	
Jane and Louise Wilson	2018		
Lubaina Himid	2018	Professor of Painting 2020–Present	
Adam Caruso and Peter St John	2018		
Níall McLaughlin	2019		
John Akomfrah	2019		
Rana Begum	2019		
Amanda Levete	2021		
Ryan Gander	2021		
Peter Barber	2021		
Michael Armitage	2021		
Hew Locke	2022		
Katherine Jones	2022		
Assemble	2022		
Clare Woods	2022		
Shirazeh Houshiary	2022		
Brian Griffiths	2022		
Veronica Ryan	2022		
Barbara Walker	2022		
Roger Hiorns	2022		
Hurvin Anderson	2023		
Stephanie Macdonald and Tom Emerson (6a architects)	2023		
Nigel Coates	2023		
Elsie Owusu	2023		
Oona Grimes	2023		
Goshka Macuga	2023		
Claudette Johnson	2024		
Helen Sear	2024		
Sikelela Owen	2024		
Caragh Thuring	2024		
Margarita Gluzberg	2025		
Liane Lang	2025		

== Honorary Royal Academicians ==
This is a partial list of Honorary Royal Academicians (Post-nominal: HonRA), academicians of the Royal Academy of Arts in London. A full list is available on the web pages of the Royal Academy Collections.

Name	Elected HonRA	Preferred Media	Ref.
Louis Gallait	15 December 1869	Painting	
Jean-Léon Gérôme	15 December 1869	Painting, Sculpture, and Printmaking	
Jean-Baptiste Claude Eugène Guillaume	15 December 1869	Sculpture	
Louis Pierre Henriquel-Dupont	15 December 1869	Painting and Printmaking	
Ernest Meissonier	15 December 1869	Painting, Sculpture, and Printmaking	
Eugène Viollet-le-Duc	15 December 1869	Architecture	
Ludwig Knaus	29 December 1882	Painting	
Adolph Menzel	12 February 1896	Painting, Printmaking, and Illustration	
Jules Breton	31 January 1899	Painting	
Léon Bonnat	27 January 1904	Painting	
Emmanuel Frémiet	27 January 1904	Sculpture	
Jozef Israëls	9 January 1906	Painting and Printmaking	
Augustus Saint-Gaudens	9 January 1906	Sculpture	
Antonin Mercié	23 January 1908	Sculpture and Painting	
Jean-Paul Laurens	27 January 1909	Painting	
Albert Bartholomé	1 March 1921	Sculpture and Painting	
Paul-Albert Besnard	1 March 1921	Painting	
Ragnar Östberg	10 June 1930	Architecture	
Cass Gilbert	5 December 1930	Architecture	
Lucien Simon	5 December 1930	Painting	
Pierre Bonnard	26 April 1940	Painting, Printmaking, and Lithography	
Carl Milles	26 April 1940	Sculpture	
André Dunoyer de Segonzac	24 April 1947	Painting, Book illustration, and Printmaking	
Ivar Tengbom	24 April 1947	Architecture	
Walter Gropius	20 April 1967	Architecture	
Oskar Kokoschka	24 April 1970	Painting	
Giacomo Manzù	24 April 1970	Sculpture and Painting	
Marc Chagall	9 May 1979	Painting	
Joan Miró	22 May 1980	Painting and Sculpture	
Josep Lluís Sert	22 May 1980	Architecture	
Balthus	17 December 1981	Painting	
Stanley William Hayter	17 December 1981	Printmaking, Etching, Line engraving, and Painting	
Eduardo Chillida	18 May 1983	Sculpture	
Willem de Kooning	18 May 1983	Painting	
Jean Dubuffet	17 January 1985	Painting	
Ralph Erskine (architect)	17 January 1985	Architecture and Town-planning	
Rufino Tamayo	20 May 1985	Painting	
Jørn Utzon	20 May 1985	Architecture	
Nikos Hadjikyriakos-Ghikas	11 December 1986	Painting, Sculpture, Printmaking, Theatre design, and Book illustration	
Maria Helena Vieira da Silva	4 May 1988	Painting	
Jasper Johns	7 December 1989	Painting and Printmaking	
Richard Diebenkorn	27 May 1992	Painting	
Antoni Tàpies	27 May 1992	Painting	
I. M. Pei	10 December 1993	Architecture	
Frank Stella	10 December 1993	Painting	
Roy Lichtenstein	23 May 1994	Painting	
Arata Isozaki	23 May 1994	Architecture	
Richard Serra	22 May 1995	Sculpture	
Anselm Kiefer	29 May 1996	Painting, Sculpture, Installation art, and Artists' books	
Andrew Wyeth	29 May 1996	Painting	
Roberto Matta	19 May 1997		
Frank Gehry	21 May 1998	Architecture	
Cy Twombly	21 May 1998	Painting	
Mimmo Paladino	26 May 1999	Sculpture, Painting, and Printmaking	
Georg Baselitz	26 May 1999	Painting and Sculpture	
Robert Rauschenberg	18 May 2000	Painting, Sculpture, and Printmaking	
Ellsworth Kelly	24 May 2001		
Bruce Nauman	24 May 2001	Sculpture, Photography, Video art, Drawing, Printmaking, and Performance	
Tadao Ando	29 May 2002	Architecture	
James Turrell	29 May 2002	Sculpture and Installation art	
Daniel Libeskind	23 May 2003	Architecture	
Edward Ruscha	26 May 2004	Painting, Printmaking, Photography, Drawing, Film making, and Artists' books	
Renzo Piano	31 May 2007	Architecture	
Rebecca Horn	10 March 2009	Sculpture, Installation art, Performance, and Film making	
Julian Schnabel	8 December 2009	Painting and Film making	
Jeff Koons	16 March 2010	Painting and Sculpture	
Cindy Sherman	16 March 2010	Photography	
Ai Weiwei	26 May 2011	Sculpture, Installation art, Architecture, and Film making	
Per Kirkeby	28 May 2011	Painting and Sculpture	
Marina Abramović	27 September 2011	Performance	
Helen Frankenthaler	27 September 2011		
Rosemarie Trockel	13 March 2013	Sculpture and Painting	
Marlene Dumas	13 March 2013	Painting and Drawing	
Peter Zumthor	12 March 2014	Architecture	
El Anatsui	12 March 2014	Sculpture	
William Kentridge	10 December 2014	Sculpture, Film making, Graphic design, Engraving, and Animation	
Jim Dine	10 December 2014	Painting, Watercolour, Assemblage, Happenings, Lithography, Photography, Sculpture, and Performance art	
Olafur Eliasson	9 March 2016	Sculpture and Installation art	
Jenny Holzer	9 March 2016	Printmaking and Sculpture	
Bill Viola	1 June 2017	Installation art, Video art, and Film making	
Kiki Smith	1 June 2017	Sculpture, Printmaking, and Artists' books	
Wim Wenders	19 March 2018	Film making and Photography	
Laurie Anderson	19 March 2018	Performance and Film making	
Carmen Herrera	30 May 2019	Painting	
Kara Walker	30 May 2019	Painting, Printmaking, Illustration, Film making, and Silhouettist	
Pipilotti Rist	9 September 2021	Video art and Installation art	
Ellen Gallagher	9 September 2021	Painting, Video art, and Film making	
Kerry James Marshall	13 December 2022		
Joan Jonas	14 December 2023		
Toyo Ito	14 December 2023		
Sarah Sze	11 December 2024		

== See also ==
- List of officers of the Royal Academy of Arts
- List of RWA Academicians – List of Royal West of England Academicians
