= The Academicians of the Royal Academy =

Painting by Johan Zoffany

- Life School of the Royal Academy
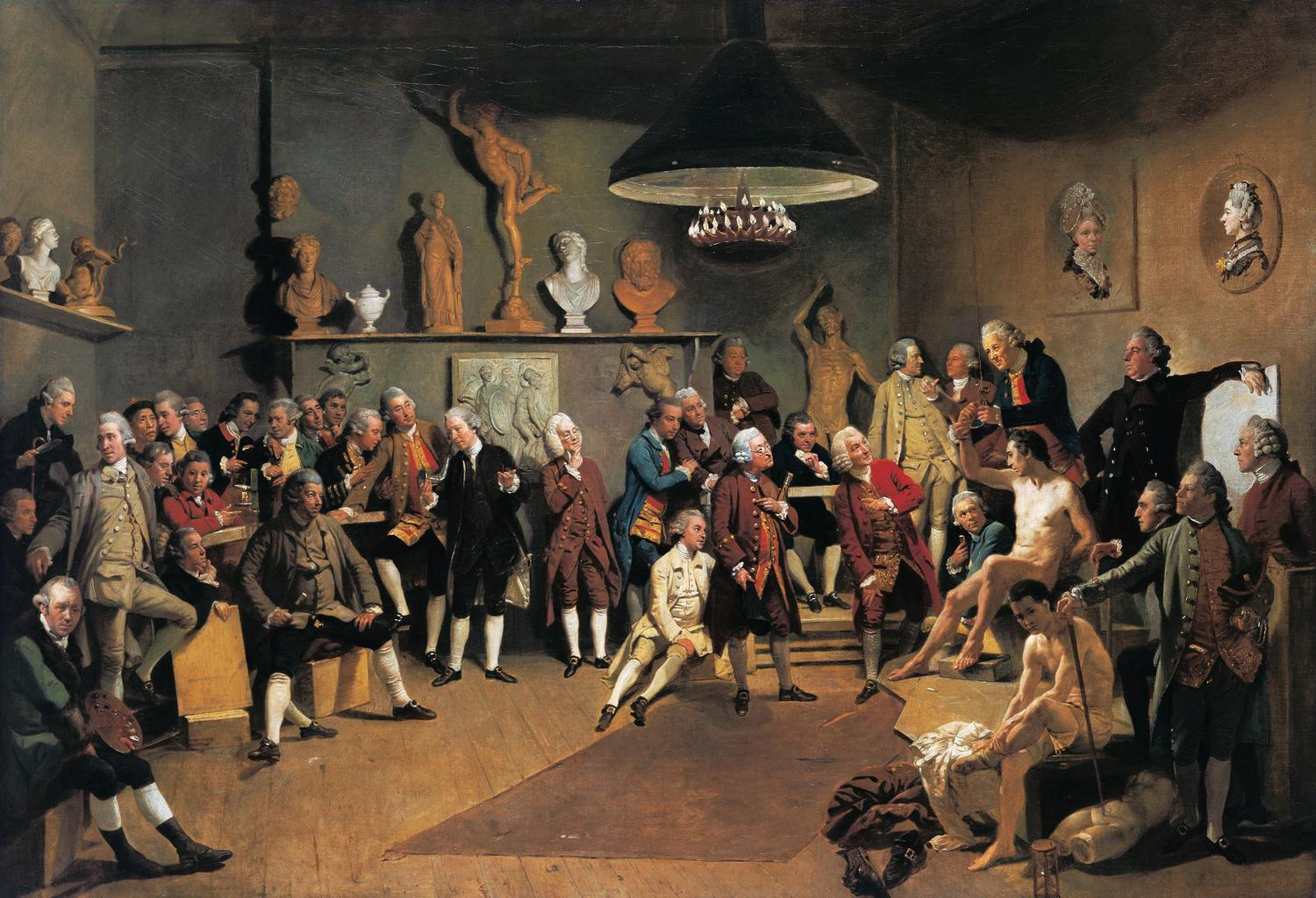
- Artist: Johan Zoffany
- Year: 1771–1772
- Medium: Oil-on-canvas
- Subject: A group portrait of members of the Royal Academy
- Dimensions: 101.1 cm × 147.3 cm (39.8 in × 58.0 in)
- Location: Royal Collection
- Accession: RCIN 400747

The Academicians of the Royal Academy (also known as Life School of the Royal Academy) is an oil painting executed in 1771–72 by Johan Zoffany. The group portrait was produced shortly after the foundation of the Royal Academy of Arts in London in 1769. It portrays 34 of the early members of the Royal Academy preparing for a life drawing class with a nude male life model. The two female founding academicians – Angelica Kauffmann and Mary Moser – are not shown as present, as it would have been deemed inappropriate for them to attend a life drawing class in person: rather, Zoffany includes them by showing their portraits hanging on the walls.

== Description ==
The oil on canvas painting measures 101.1 cm × 147.5 cm (39.8 in × 58.1 in). It may have been commissioned by George III and it is held in the Royal Collection. It draws inspiration from Raphael's School of Athens, with the artist Joshua Reynolds and the anatomist William Hunter taking the roles of Plato and Aristotle in a new "School of London".

The painting depicts the academy's cluttered drawing room at Old Somerset House, demolished from 1775 – a working space not a show space, decorated with various paintings and casts of statues. A nude male life model has taken a pose on a platform to the right. A second male model is shown in the act of removing his clothes, in the pose of the Spinario sculpture. An hourglass times each pose, but also acts as a memento mori, that life is short but art is long ("Ars longa, vita brevis"). The main source of light is a large oil lamp hanging from the ceiling, creating deep shadows on the walls: its flames show the colours of a Newtonian spectrum. A table running round the edge of the room has individual shaded candleholders for each of the artists.

== Subjects ==
The Academicians depicted (all founder members in 1768 unless noted) are:

- George Barret Sr.
- Francesco Bartolozzi
- Edward Burch (1771)
- Agostino Carlini
- Charles Catton (the Elder)
- Mason Chamberlin
- Sir William Chambers
- Giovanni Battista Cipriani
- Richard Cosway (1771)
- John Gwynn
- Francis Hayman
- William Hoare (1769)
- Nathaniel Hone the Elder
- William Hunter
- Angelica Kauffmann (portrait)
- Jeremiah Meyer
- George Michael Moser
- Mary Moser (portrait)
- Francis Milner Newton
- Joseph Nollekens (1772)
- Edward Penny
- Sir Joshua Reynolds
- John Inigo Richards
- Paul Sandby
- Thomas Sandby
- Dominic Serres (the Elder)
- Peter Toms
- William Tyler
- Samuel Wale
- Benjamin West
- Richard Wilson
- Joseph Wilton
- Richard Yeo
- Johan Zoffany (1769)
- Francesco Zuccarelli

They are distributed around the room, most conversing rather than drawing or painting. Sir Joshua Reynolds, the President of the Royal Academy, is in black to the left of centre, with his ear trumpet. Zoffany became a Royal Academician in 1769, and he includes himself as a self portrait at the far left, with his palette. He is balanced on the right side of the painting by the second model and a fragment of marble torso.

Also included with the Royal Academicians is the Chinese artist Tan-Che-Qua – fifth from the left – who was visiting London at the time, and two life models.

Five founder members of the Royal Academy are not depicted: John Baker (died 1771), Francis Cotes (died 1770), George Dance the Younger, Nathaniel Dance, and Thomas Gainsborough.

== See also ==
- List of Royal Academicians
- The Royal Academicians in General Assembly by Henry Singleton, 1795
