= The Royal Academicians in General Assembly =

Painting by Henry Singleton

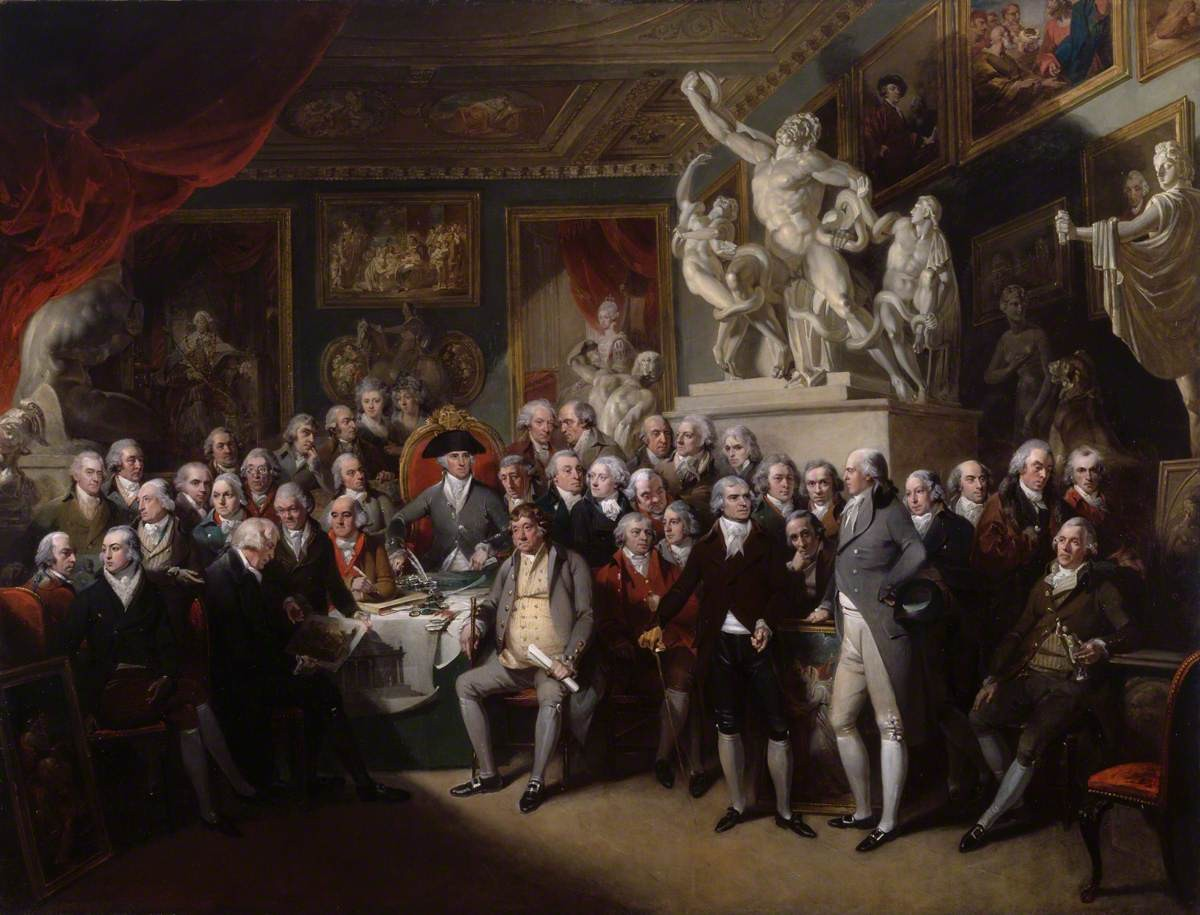
- Artist: Henry Singleton
- Year: 1795
- Type: Oil on canvas, history painting
- Dimensions: 198.1 cm × 259 cm (78.0 in × 102 in)
- Location: Royal Academy of Arts, London

The Royal Academicians in General Assembly is a 1795 oil painting by the English artist Henry Singleton. It depicts the assembled members of the British Royal Academy of Arts in the Council Chamber at Somerset House in London, then the headquarters of the academy. They are judging the various works of art produced by students of the academy. In his diary Joseph Farington noted disagreements amongst the Academicians about their respective placings in the picture. It includes many members who did not actually attend meetings including the two founding female members Angelica Kauffman and Mary Moser.

On the wall on the right is a self-portrait of the first president of the Royal Academy Joshua Reynolds who had died in 1792. Two subsequent presidents are shown in the crowd, his successor the American-born Benjamin West and the young Thomas Lawrence, then an associate of the Royal Academy. West sits on the Presidential throne while to his right in a yellow waistcoat is the architect William Chambers who had designed the building at Somerset House. The noted portraitist William Beechey is included, although he wasn't elected for another three years. There are a number of casts of sculptures on display behind the artists, including the Apollo Belvedere, Borghese Gladiator, Laocoön and His Sons, and Venus de' Medici. The paintings include portraits of George III and Queen Charlotte by Reynolds, Christ Blessing Little Children by West, Spring by Mary Moser, The Tribute Money by John Singleton Copley and Samson and Delilah by John Francis Rigaud.

The work is today in the collection of the Royal Academy as is an 1800 engraving based on it by Cantlo Bestland. The painting was commissioned by Bestland in anticipation of the engraving, but Singleton may have hoped it would be purchased as a commemoration by the academy, which had celebrated its twenty fifth anniversary in December 1793. In fact it was not exhibited there until 1822 and was only acquired when Philip Hardwick gifted it in 1861.

== See also ==
- The Academicians of the Royal Academy, 1771 painting by Johan Zoffany

== Bibliography ==
- Betzer, Sarah. Animating the Antique: Sculptural Encounter in the Age of Aesthetic Theory. Penn State Press, 2022.
- Hutchison, Sidney C. The History of the Royal Academy 1768-1968. Chapman & Hall, 1968.
