= David Garrick Between Tragedy and Comedy =

Painting by Joshua Reynolds

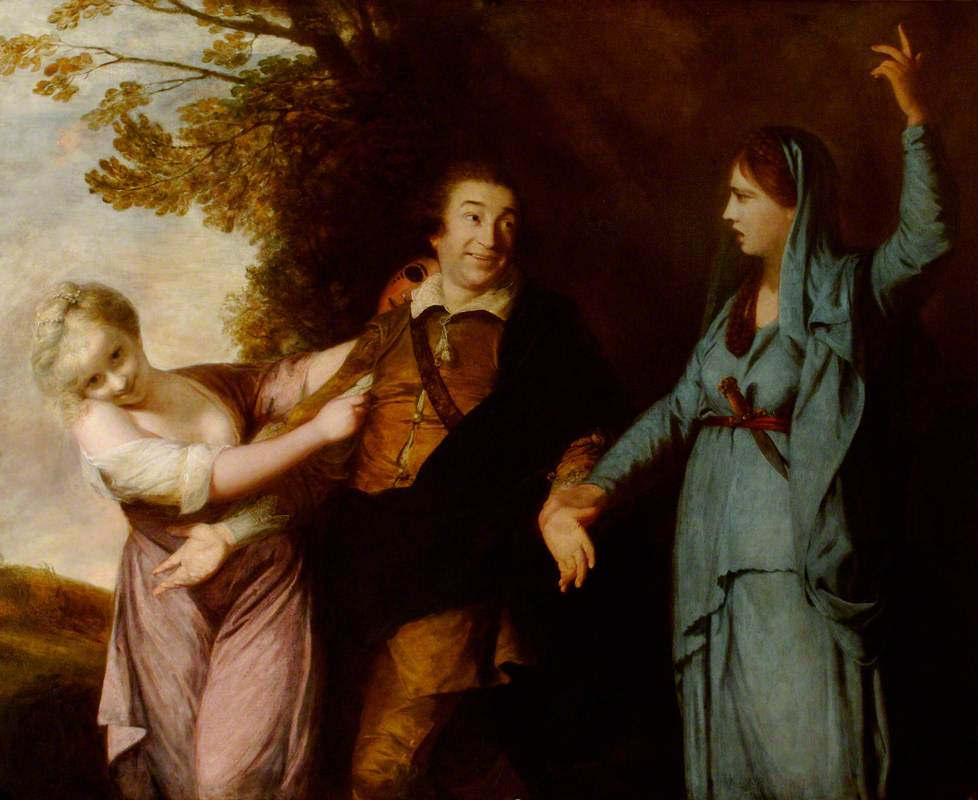
- Artist: Joshua Reynolds
- Year: 1761
- Movement: Rococo, Neoclassical
- Subject: Melpomene, David Garrick, Thalia
- Location: Waddesdon Manor, Buckinghamshire
- Owner: National Trust

David Garrick Between Tragedy and Comedy is a 1761 painting by the English painter Joshua Reynolds, depicting the actor and playwright David Garrick caught between the Muses of Tragedy and Comedy. It is regarded as one of Reynolds's most studied and well-known paintings, and is on display at Waddesdon Manor, Buckinghamshire.

== Description ==
Reynolds has drawn a large picture of three figures to the knees, the thought taken by Garrick from the judgment of Hercules. It represents Garrick between Tragedy and Comedy. The former exhorts him to follow her exalted vocation, but Comedy drags him away, and he seems to yield willingly, though endeavouring to excuse himself, and pleading that he is forced. Tragedy is a good antique figure, but wants more dignity in the expression of her face. Comedy is a beautiful and winning girl–but Garrick's face is distorted, and burlesque. Lord Halifax has given him £300 for it!

— Horace Walpole

The art historian Horace Walpole provided the earliest known description of David Garrick Between Tragedy and Comedy. Walpole also recorded that George Montagu-Dunk, 2nd Earl of Halifax, bought the painting for £300, though it is unclear if this ever actually occurred.

David Garrick stands in the centre of the painting wearing an Anthony van Dyck costume, against a rural landscape with a field and woodland. He stands between the Muse of Comedy, known as Thalia, and the Muse of Tragedy, known as Melpomene. He appears conflicted and hesitates between them, starting to transform from a tragic playwright into a comedian. Tragedy grabs Garrick's wrist with one hand and raises her other hand. Comedy is framed by a field and sky as she pulls on Garrick's arm. The painting has motifs similar to 18th-century theatrical frontispieces depicting the Muses of Tragedy and Comedy: the Muse of Tragedy has a dagger and raises one arm, and the Muse of Comedy holds a mask in her left hand.

The differences between the two Muses are both formal and iconographic. Comedy is painted in the rococo style, reminiscent of the work of Antonio da Correggio. Tragedy is drawn in the neoclassical style, after the style of Guido Reni. The painting employs elements of Augustan imagery, with its clothing, light, and shadow. Comedy has slightly tousled fair hair, resembling the bacchante drawn by Peter Paul Rubens. She wears washed-out mauve clothing. Tragedy wears a strong blue dress, with her head and arms covered as if in mourning. Comedy smiles at the viewer, while Tragedy looks sternly at Garrick. Comedy is in dappled light, while Tragedy is strongly lit from above, with a dark background. The side of Garrick's face towards Comedy is smiling and illuminated, while other side is in shadows as he looks worriedly at Tragedy.

Art historians often compare the painting to a scene in Greek mythology in which the god Hercules has to choose between Virtue and Pleasure. Reynolds' painting parodied this scene in that, whereas Hercules ultimately chooses the more modestly dressed Virtue, Garrick starts to succumb to the more immodestly dressed muse of Comedy. It also differs from traditional compositions of this scene, which generally feature detached full-length figures.

== History ==
=== Background ===
David Garrick was famous as both a tragedian and comedian, and his earliest known association with the Muses of Tragedy and Comedy was in a 1747 poem by William Whitehead. In 1761, the same year Reynolds finished his painting of Garrick, a pamphlet with the signatures of the Muses of Comedy and Tragedy praised Garrick's theatrical achievements. The historian David Mannings has suggested that the painting's composition was inspired by Guido Reni's Lot and his Daughters Leaving Sodom.

The painting follows instructions outlined in Notion of the Historical Draught of Hercules by Anthony Ashley-Cooper, 3rd Earl of Shaftesbury, which used the Choice of Hercules as an example of educational and moral art. The painting shows Reynolds moving away from strict portraiture, symbolized by Tragedy, to more witty iconography, symbolized by Comedy.

=== The painting and its prints ===
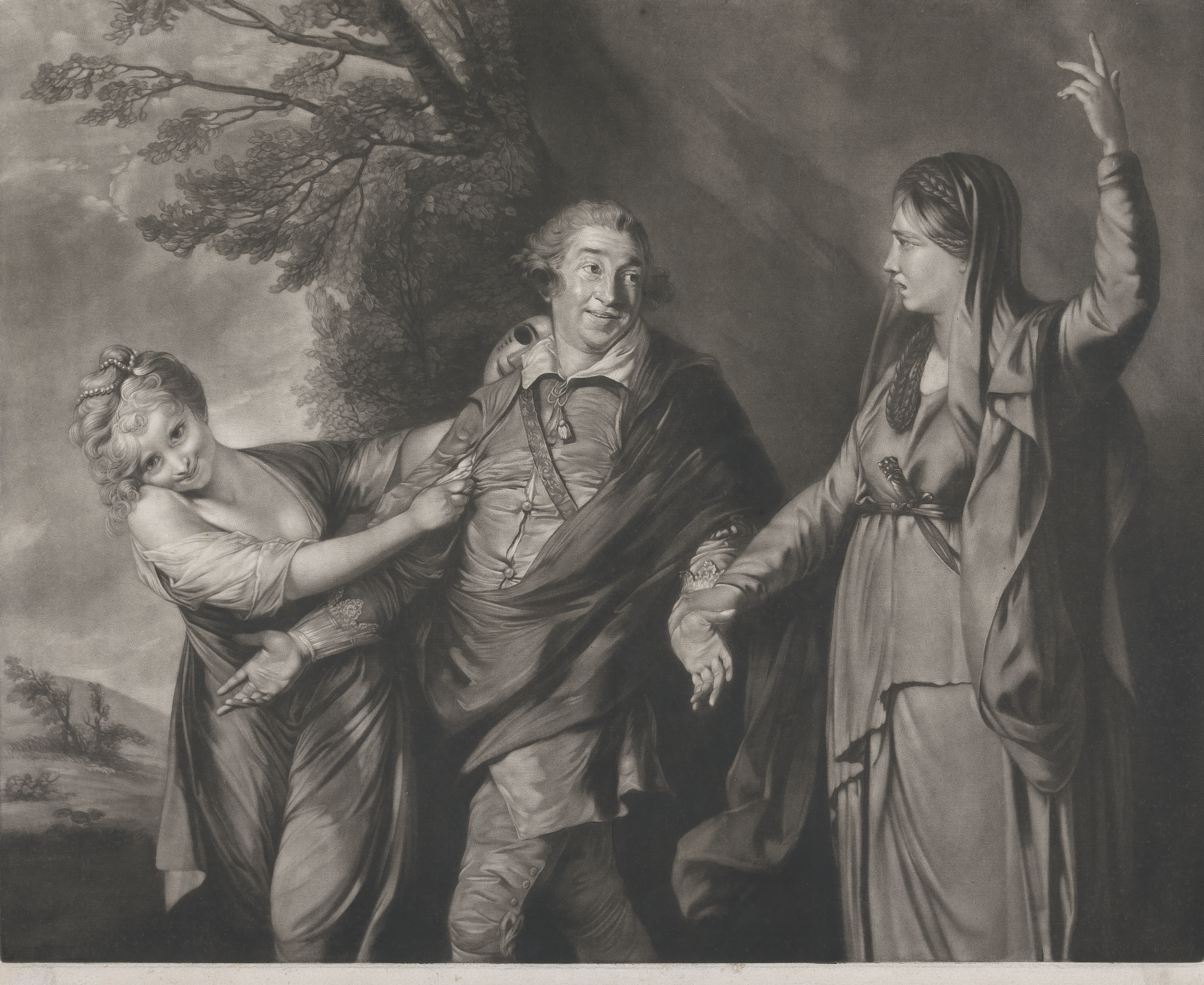
Mezzotint print by Edward Fisher

Reynolds made this painting mainly in 1760–1761, around the same time he was working on a portrait of Laurence Sterne. Edward Edwards called it Reynolds's "first attempt in historical composition". The painting had a mixed reception when it was first published, with some arguing it showed Reynolds' painting skills, while others disagreed.

Edward Fisher created a mezzotint for the painting in 1762 before he exhibited it in May 1762 at the Society of Artists' Exhibition of 1762 as Mr. Garrick, between two muses of tragedy and comedy. Fisher published his mezzotint in November 1762, having the inscription "Reddere personae scit convenientia cuique", meaning "he knows how to give to each what is appropriate". In 1764, Reynolds requested copies of this print to give to his admirers. The print was copied and pirated, producing at least fourteen different mezzotints. One of these prints, which was sold in France in 1765, had the inscription L'Homme entre le Vice et la Vertu.

=== Legacy ===
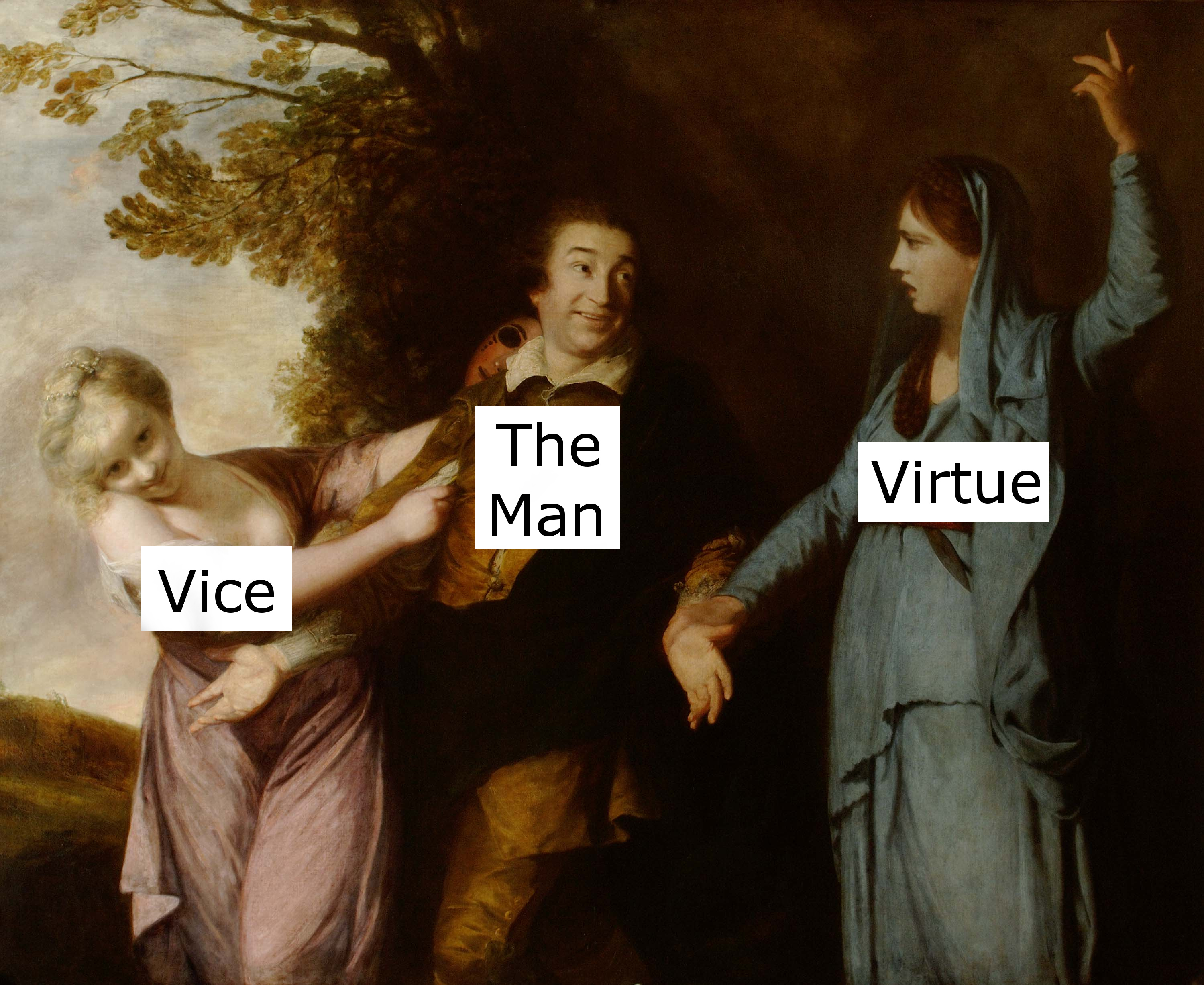
Distracted boyfriend meme inspired by a print of David Garrick Between Tragedy and Comedy

Garrick's 1775 play The Theatrical Candidates alludes to the painting when the two main characters Tragedy and Comedy enter into a dispute, and the character Harlequin interjects and argues the audience prefers him over both of them. The painting possibly helped inspire Henry Fuseli's painting "The Infant Shakespeare between Tragedy and Comedy".

The painting became one of Reynolds's most studied and well-known works. On 16 April 2018, a Twitter user called the painting "the 18th century equivalent" of the distracted boyfriend meme, a 2017 internet meme based on a 2015 stock photograph depicting a disloyal man and two women. The comparison went viral and eventually, other social media users started using the painting as a meme similar to the distracted boyfriend meme.

The painting was acquired by the Rothschild family and housed at Waddesdon Manor; after the death of Jacob Rothschild in 2024, the painting was given to the National Trust under the acceptance in lieu scheme and remains at Waddeson where it has been on display since 1995.
