= Stephen Francis Dutilh Rigaud =

English painter

Stephen Francis Dutilh Rigaud (London 26 December 1777 – 1861) was an English painter.

== Life ==
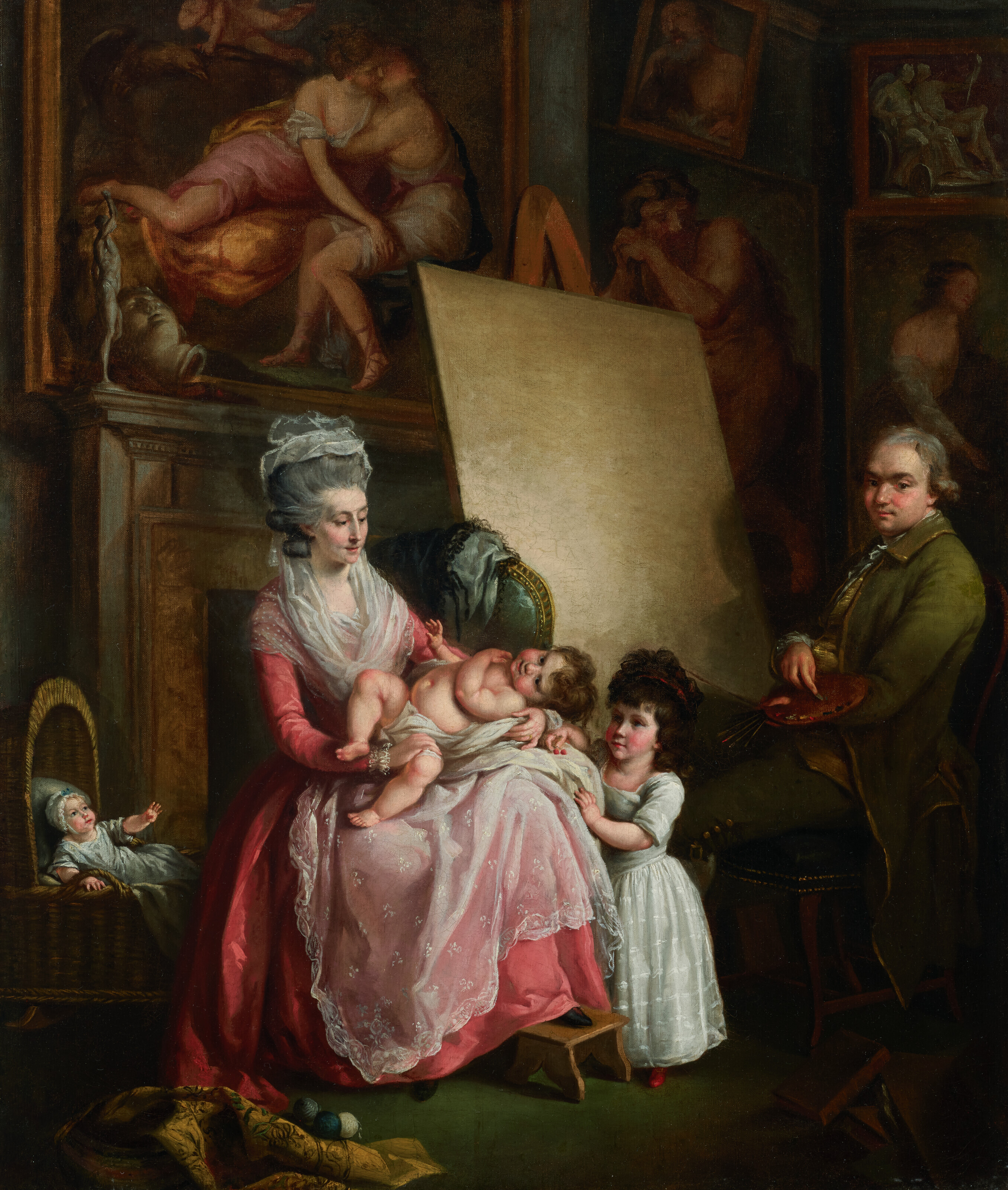
John Francis Rigaud, Portrait of the artist with his wife and children, in his studio, 1782. Stephen is the naked baby on his mother's lap..

He was the only son of John Francis Rigaud, born at 44 Great Titchfield Street, London. He was not closely related to Stephen Peter Rigaud, but was the godson of his father, Stephen.

Rigaud was brought up by his father as an artist, and in 1792 was admitted a student of the Royal Academy. In 1794 he gained the silver palette from the Society of Arts for a classical group and in 1799 the gold palette for a historical painting. In 1801 he gained the gold medal of the Royal Academy for a historical painting of Clytemnestra.

In 1798, while on a visit to the Rev. Robert Nixon at Foot's Cray in Kent, he accompanied Nixon and J. M. W. Turner on a sketching tour. He was the assistant of his father in many of his decorative paintings at Packington, Windsor Castle, and elsewhere. In 1805 he was one of the first six members added to the foundation members of the Old Society of Painters in Water-colours. After the temporary dissolution of the water-colour society in November 1812, he dropped out. In 1814 he was a member of a rival water-colour society which held exhibitions in that and the following years. He exhibited with the British Institution and the Society of British Artists.

Rigaud had, on 1 January 1808, married Margaret Davies of Milford Haven, and in 1817, because of his wife's health, he gave up professional work as an artist and moved to Pembrokeshire. After his wife's death, on 1 January 1839, he returned to London but had little success as an artist. He died in 1861, at the age of 84, and was buried in Abney Park Cemetery. He left no family.

== Works ==
As well as pictures at the Royal Academy, Rigaud exhibited drawings with the Old Society and the British Institution. His subjects were sacred, classical, or drawn from John Milton, Ossian, and other poets.
