= Terrick Williams =

British painter (1860–1936)

- Born: 20 July 1860; Liverpool, England
- Died: 20 July 1936 (aged 76); Plymouth, Devon, England
- Other names: John Terrick Williams
- Occupation: Painter
- Years active: 1889-1936
- Known for: Marine paintings and the painting of light
- Notable work: The Quayside, Concarneu

John Terrick Williams RA RI ROI (20 July 1860 – 20 July 1936), better known as Terrick Williams was a British painter who was a member of the Royal Academy.

== Early life ==
Williams was born on 20 July 1860 in Liverpool, England, the son of a businessman. He was educated at King's College School, Wimbleton, London and was expected by his father to continue in the family business. However, his determination to become an artist saw him abandon his business career and move to Europe in 1885 and study under Charles Verlat in Antwerp and later at the Académie Julian and Jean-Joseph Benjamin-Constant, William-Adolphe Bouguereau and Tony Robert-Fleury in Paris.

== Work ==
After his student days in Paris, he moved to St. Ives in 1890 where he lived, between there and his London home at 89 Guntherstone Road, West Kensington, until his death. Williams was a medallist at the Paris Salon in 1908 (3rd class), and 1911 (2nd class), and also won a 2nd class medal in Balcelona of the same year. He exhibited, not only in Europe, but also at the Carnegie Institute in Philadelphia.

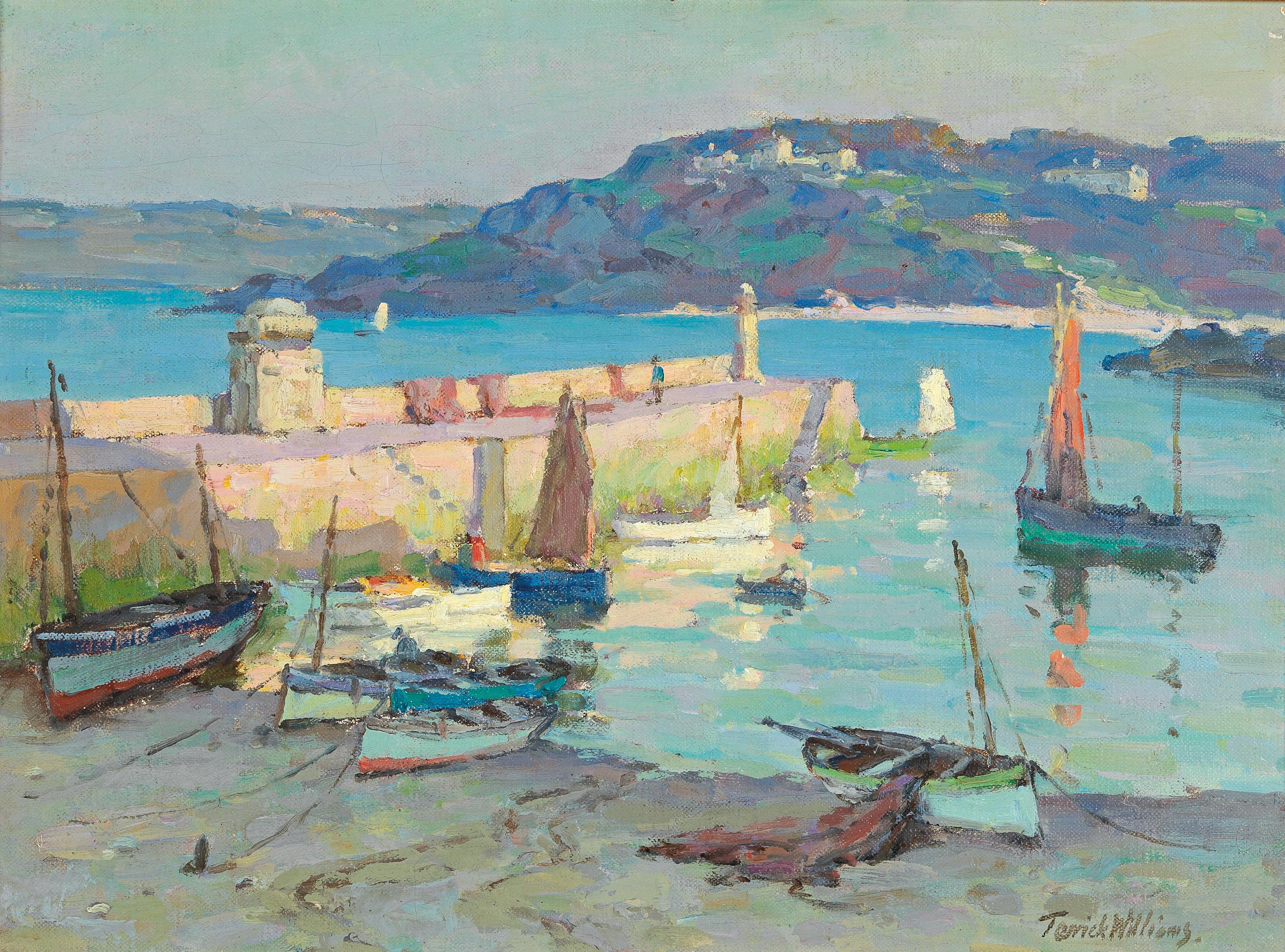
The Jetty St Ives Evening, an oil painting by Williams

Williams focussed on landscape and marine subjects and painted in oil, pastel and watercolour. Baldry said that a number of notable paintings of marine subject stand to Williams's credit, and that His right to a place among the chief of the British marine painters of the present day is indisputable. He travelled extensively and his impressionistic, luminous paintings sought the transient effects of light and reflections in Venice, St. Tropez, Paris, Brittany and St. Ives.

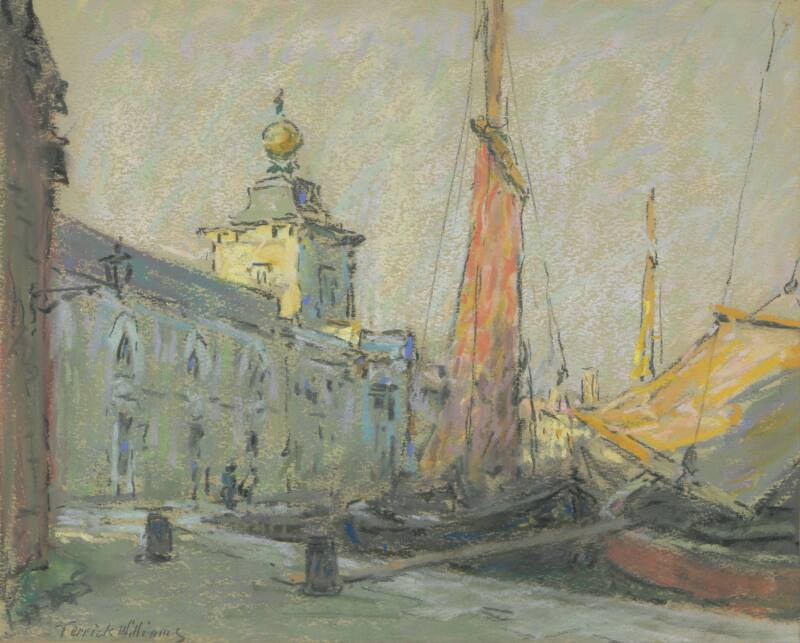
On the Zattere, Venice - ABDAG003440

Littlejohns said the Williams was pre-eminently a painter of light and that he found most inspiration in the sunniest parts of Europe. Baldry stated that as a colourist he is more than ordinarily endowed, that Williams had the real colour emotion, and that his use colour was controlled by an unerring taste. Littlejohns said that Williams' paintings was probably influenced by the fact that he sketches in colour. The Western Mail spoke of some of his paintings being beautiful works of mellow colouring

He was elected a member of the Royal Institute of Painters in Water Colours in 1904. His work was regularly exhibited at the Royal Academy from 1891. He was elected an Associate of the Royal Academy (A.R.A.) on 18 November 1924, a Royal Academician (R.A.) on 14 February 1933, and a Senior R.A. on 1 January 1936. In 1933 he was also elected President of the RI.

== Death ==
He died in at the Joe Park Nursing Home in Plymouth on his birthday in 1936 aged 76, after a number of years of indifferent health. He had never married. After his death a memorial exhibition was held at the Fine Art Society in 1937. Thirty-three of his works are in public collections in the UK.
