= Samuel Melton Fisher =

British artist

- Born: 2 January 1859; London, England
- Died: 5 September 1939 (aged 80); Camberley, Surrey, England
- Known for: Painting

Samuel Melton Fisher (1859–1939) was a British artist. After attending Dulwich College he was a student at the Royal Academy Schools. He spent over a decade in Italy, producing scenes of Venice He was elected an associate member of the Royal Academy in 1917 and a full member in 1924.

As well as routinely sending work to the Royal Academy Exhibitions, he also featured at the Royal Hibernian Academy and the Grosvenor Gallery amongst others. His son Stefani Melton Fisher (1894-1963) also became a painter.

== Gallery ==
Venetian Costume Makers, 1888

A Southern Belle, 1893

Asleep, 1902

The Chess Players, 1903

Hugh Edwardes, 6th Baron Kensington, 1919

== Bibliography ==
- Windsor, Alan (ed.) Handbook of Modern British Painting and Printmaking 1900-90. Taylor & Francis, 2022.
