= Distracted boyfriend =

Stock photograph and internet meme

Coordinates: 41°58′57.6″N 2°49′16.5″E

The stock photograph that inspired the meme

Distracted boyfriend is an Internet meme based on a 2015 stock photograph by Spanish photographer Antonio Guillem. Social media users started using the image as a meme at the start of 2017, and it went viral in August 2017 as a way to depict different forms of disloyalty. The meme has inspired various spin-offs and received critical acclaim.

== Stock photograph ==
The stock image was taken in the city of Girona in Catalonia, Spain, in mid-2015 by photographer Antonio Guillem from Barcelona. Guillem told Wired that he and the stock image models planned on having a session that would represent the concept of infidelity "in a playful and fun way". The boyfriend and girlfriend in the photograph are known by their stage names "Mario" and "Laura". "Laura" later described the experience shooting the stock images, saying: "When people saw us simulate those scenes in the street, they stopped to look and laugh and, in my case that I had to have a more serious face, I had a hard time to keeping it [sic]".

The image was uploaded to Shutterstock with the caption: "Disloyal man walking with his girlfriend and looking amazed at another seductive girl". Regarding the copyright status of this image, Guillem has stated that his images "are subject to copyright laws and the license agreements of the microstock agencies. It's not allowed to use any image without purchasing the proper license in any possible way, so each one of the people that use the images without the license are doing it illegally. This is not the thing that really worries us, as they are just a group of people doing it in good faith, and we are not going to take any action, except for the extreme cases in which this good faith doesn't exist".

== Meme ==
The first known use of the stock image as an internet meme was posted to a Turkish progressive rock Facebook group in January 2017. The post labeled the man as Phil Collins, who is being distracted from progressive rock by pop music. This meme was reposted on an English-language progressive rock Facebook page the next day, and then on Twitter on February 2, 2017. Later that month, the original stock photograph was shared on Instagram and got almost 30,000 likes.

The meme started going viral on August 19, 2017 after a Twitter user posted the photograph with the man labeled "the youth" being distracted from his girlfriend "capitalism" by "socialism". Another Twitter user copied this meme, getting retweeted more than 35,000 retweets and nearly 100,000 likes. The meme and its permutations went viral on Twitter, Reddit, and Facebook. The distracted-boyfriend meme is listed by Know Your Meme as an example of object labeling. The girlfriend in the meme generally came to represent something that one is supposed to do and the woman wearing red came to represent something more desirable or riskier.

The models "Mario" and "Laura" say they first learned about the memes based on their photograph when people started posting them to their social media accounts. In late August 2017, Guillem told The Guardian that "I didn't even know what a meme is until recently. The models discovered the meme on social media and they told me about it. None of us could imagine the media repercussion that it has reached right now".

Some brands started using the meme when it started going viral. In early January 2018, a version of the meme referencing the biblical story of Lot's wife turning into a pillar of salt went viral on Twitter. The meme was used in a sign for the "Enough! National School Walkout" gun violence protest in March 2018. On June 25, 2018, Twitter user Ernie Smith noted other stock images in which the girlfriend from the original meme is surprised looking at screens.

In November 2020, it was used in a commercial for Jules, a French clothing company.

The New York Times published the meme in its Business section on May 29, 2019, referencing the proposed merger of Renault and Fiat Chrysler Automobiles. The boyfriend is labeled as "Renault", who is being distracted by "Fiat Chrysler" with his girlfriend "Nissan".

== Variations and spin-offs ==
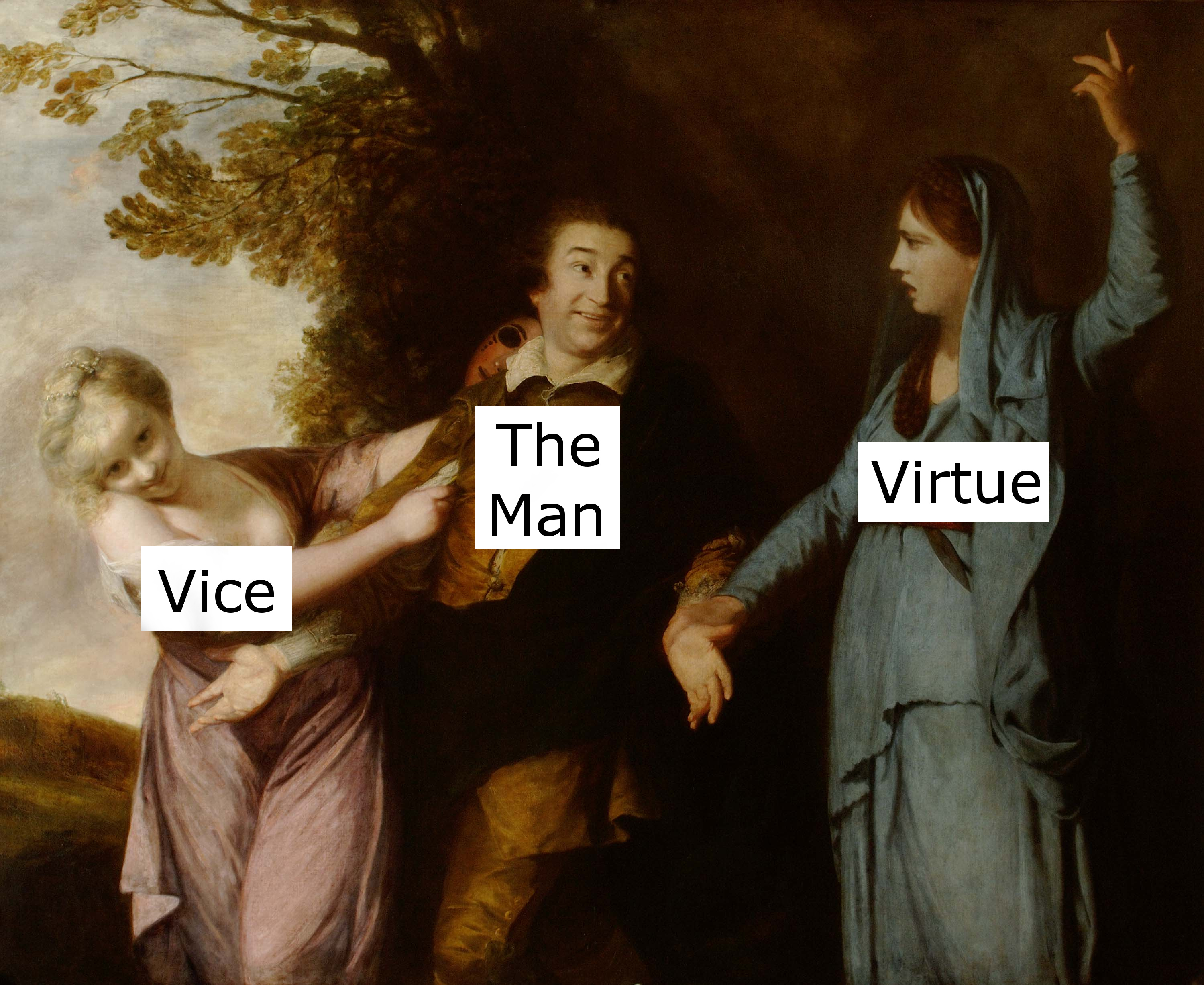
Meme inspired by a print of the 1761 painting David Garrick Between Tragedy and Comedy

Early variations of the distracted meme used other photos from Guillem's photo shoot of the three stock characters to create a story. In late January 2018, some social media users noted similarities between the meme and a Mission: Impossible – Fallout teaser image featuring Henry Cavill and Angela Bassett. On April 16, 2018, a Twitter user called the Joshua Reynolds 1761 painting David Garrick Between Tragedy and Comedy the "18th-century equivalent" of the distracted boyfriend meme; the painting itself would then become popular as a similar meme with historic references.

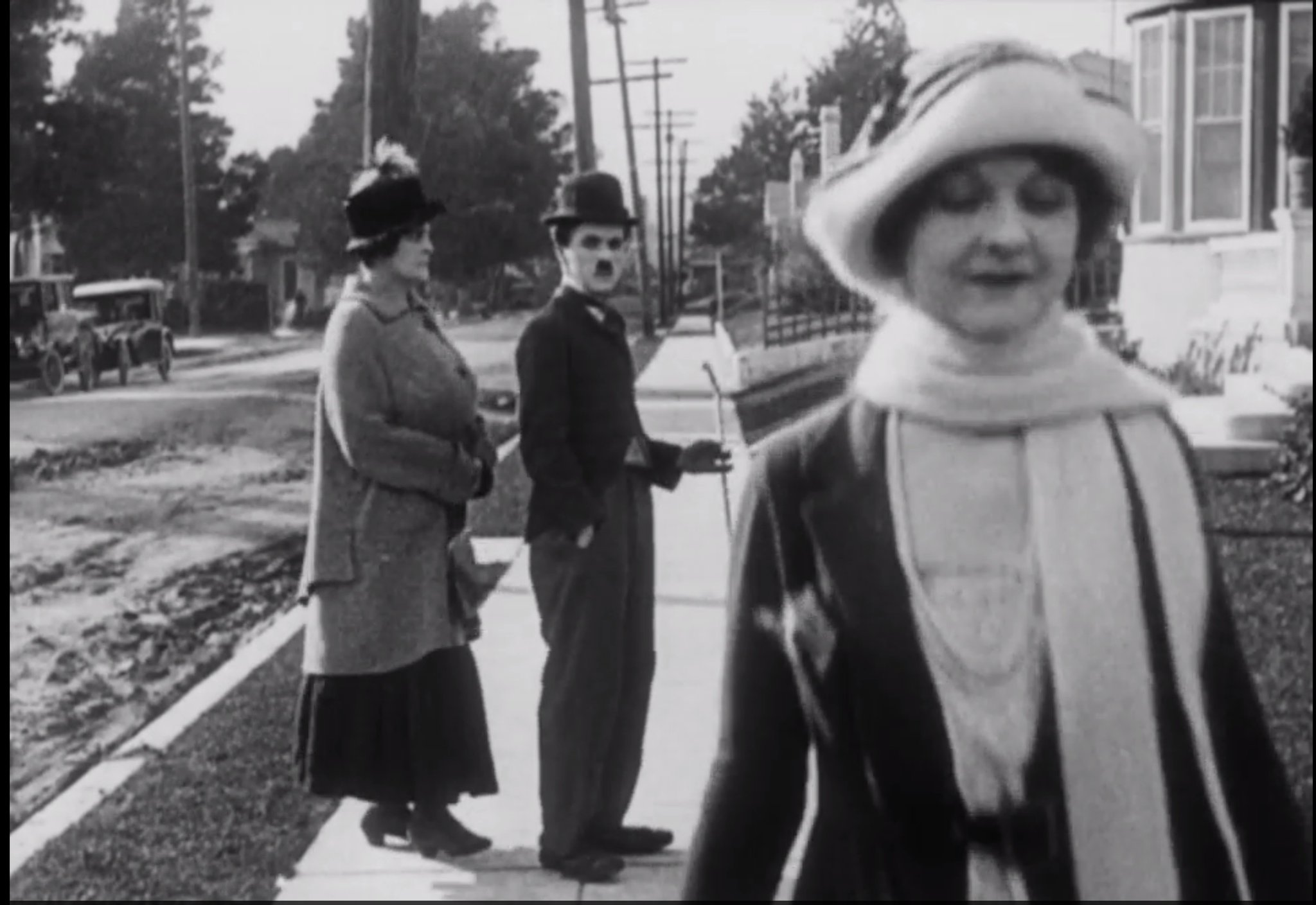
Similarities have been drawn with a shot from Charlie Chaplin's 1922 film, Pay Day

In May 2018, a Twitter user posted an image pairing a coin commemorating the wedding of Prince Harry and Meghan Markle with one of the characters from the meme. In June 2018, film writer Peter Goldberg posted on his Twitter account a scene from Charlie Chaplin's 1922 short film Pay Day with a format similar to the distracted-boyfriend meme. In July 2018, a photograph of a woman eating ice cream with a man and a woman holding hands in Venice went viral because of its similarities to the distracted boyfriend meme. A version of the meme featuring a distracted groom went viral on Twitter in October 2018.

In Hungary, another stock photo of the same two models was used in a government campaign to promote child birth, prompting ridicule.

== Reception ==
Nathan Heller of The New Yorker wrote that "the delight of the Distracted Boyfriend meme was not unlike the perverse pleasure taken by Distracted Boyfriend himself: it allowed America to turn its attention away from much more important commitments". Tiffany Kelly of The Daily Dot wrote that "the distracted boyfriend meme's range, unintentionally created by Guillem's portfolio, set it apart from other popular internet content [in 2017]". Clair Valentine of Paper listed the meme as one that defined the year 2017, writing that "They say that often, the most specific stories are in fact the most universal, and this meme's absurd popularity proves that point beyond a shadow of a doubt".

The meme made various lists of the top memes of 2017, including NDTV The Next Web, PC Magazine, The Ringer, and Narcity. The Washington Post listed the meme on its "Meme Hall of Fame of 2017", calling it "the ultimate stock photo meme with endless permutations". The Reddit moderators of the /r/MemeEconomy subreddit told Inverse that they thought it was one of the best memes of 2017. In April 2018, the meme won the Best Meme of 2017 category at the 10th Annual Shorty Awards.

Joe McCarthy of Global Citizen wrote that the original photograph depicts "sexual harassment", and criticized most uses of the meme for failing "to transcend the image's inherent, toxic sexism". In September 2018, Sweden's advertising ombudsman determined the internet service provider Bahnhof had broken rules against gender discrimination when it used the meme in an advertisement which portrayed Bahnhof's employment opportunities as the attention-stealing woman and the ignored girlfriend as "your current workplace".
