= Portrait of Horatio Nelson (Rigaud) =

Painting by John Francis Rigaud

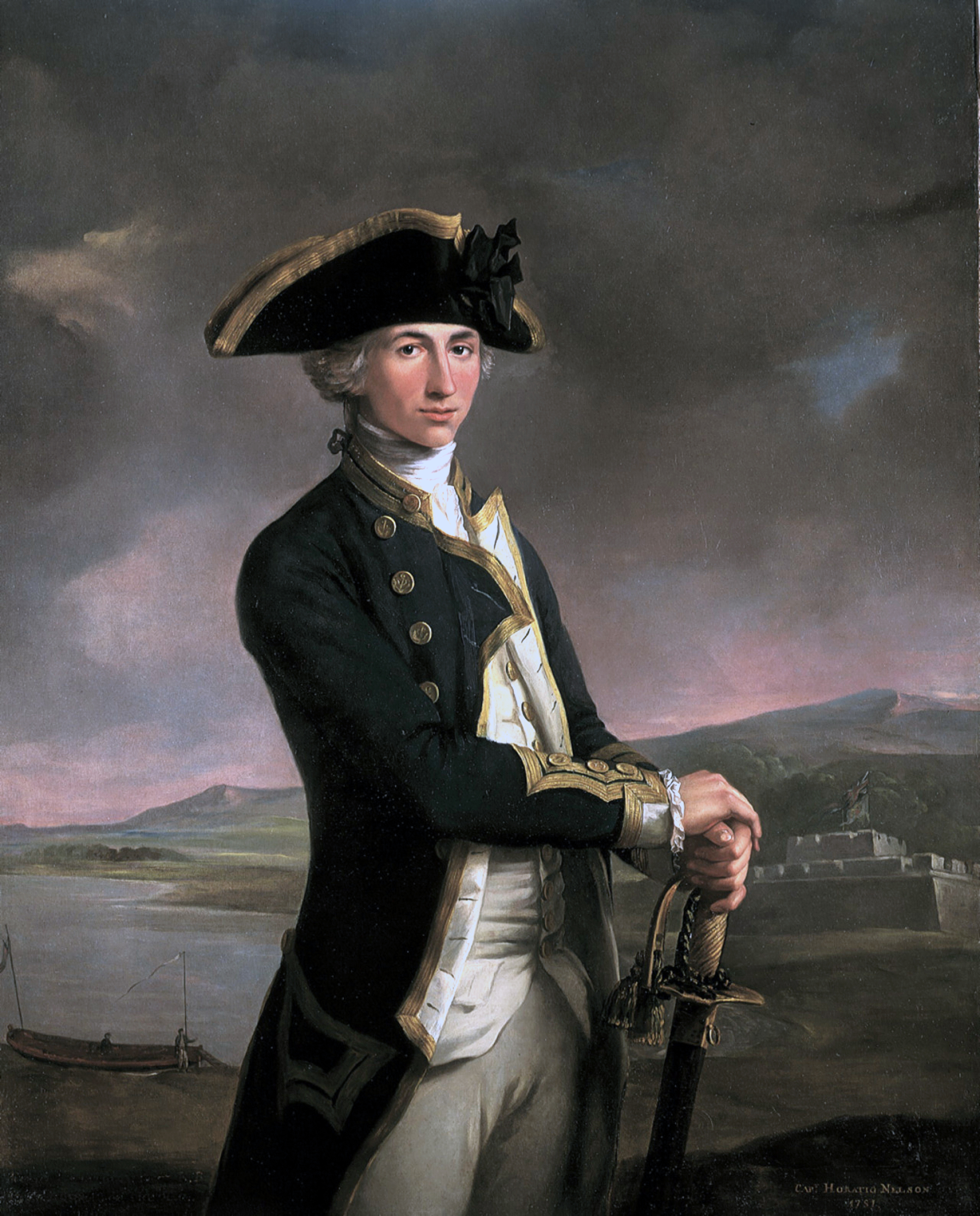
- Artist: John Francis Rigaud
- Year: 1781
- Type: Oil on canvas, portrait painting
- Dimensions: 127 cm × 101.5 cm (50 in × 40.0 in)
- Location: National Maritime Museum, Greenwich

Portrait of Horatio Nelson is a 1781 portrait painting by the Italian-born English artist John Francis Rigaud depicting the British sailor Horatio Nelson. Later a celebrated admiral, known for his victories at the Battle of the Nile and Battle of Trafalgar, Nelson was at this time a young captain in the Royal Navy. It is occasionally known as the Young Nelson.

It was one of several works commissioned of promising young officers by their commander William Locker. It was commissioned in 1777 when he was still a lieutenant but not finished until he had returned to England following service during the American War of Independence, by which time he had been promoted to captain. It was readjusted to reflect his promotion. He is shown in the full dress uniform with the 1780 attack on San Juan in Central America as a backdrop. Today it is in the collection of the National Maritime Museum in Greenwich.

== Bibliography ==
- Coleman, Terry. The Nelson Touch: The Life and Legend of Horatio Nelson. Oxford University Press, 2004.
- Vincent, Edgar. Nelson: Love & Fame. Yale University Press, 2003.
- Walker, Richard. The Nelson Portraits: An Iconography of Horatio, Viscount Nelson. Royal Naval Museum Publications, 1998.
