= Samson and Delilah (Rigaud) =

Painting by John Francis Rigaud

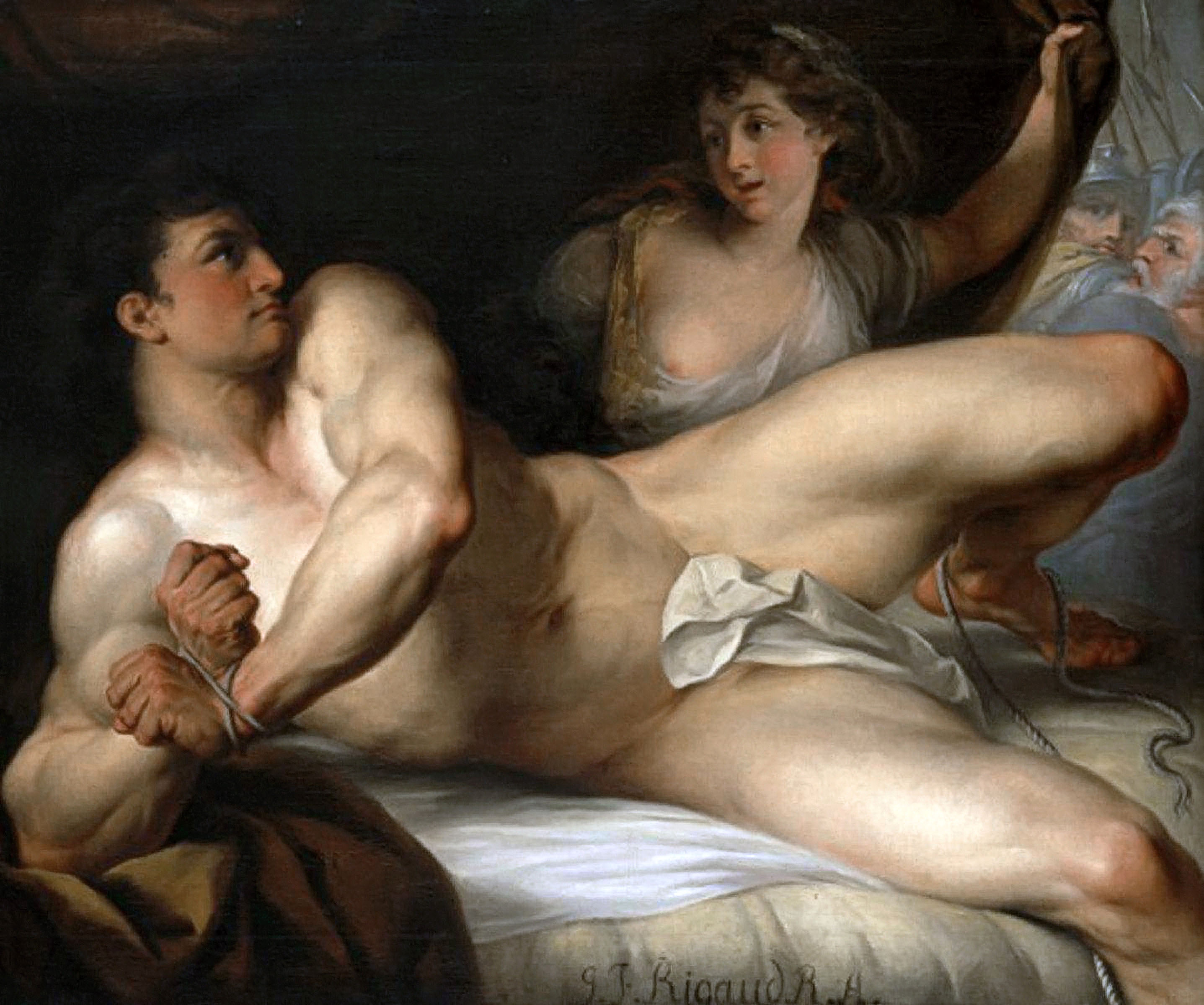
- Artist: John Francis Rigaud
- Year: 1784
- Type: Oil on canvas, history painting
- Dimensions: 130.3 cm × 152.6 cm (51.3 in × 60.1 in)
- Location: Royal Academy of Arts; London

Samson and Delilah is a 1784 history painting by the Italian-born British artist John Francis Rigaud. It depicts the biblical scene of Samson and Delilah, a popular subject in art. Unusually Riguad chose to show the moment of Samson breaking free of his chains rather than the more famous scene of Delilah cutting his hair. It is also known as Samson Breaking his Bands.

After being elected to full membership as a Royal Academician, Riguad presented this as his diploma work to the Royal Academy of Arts which was then based in Somerset House.

== Bibliography ==
- Eynikel, Erik M.M. & Nicklas, Tobias (ed.) Samson: Hero Or Fool? The Many Faces of Samson. Brill, 2014.
- Myrone, Martin, Frayling, Christopher & Warner, Matthew. Fothic Nightmares: Fuseli, Blake and the Romantic Imagination. Harry N. Abrams, 2006
