= Margarita Gluzberg =

Contemporary British artist

Margarita Gluzberg RA (born 1968) is a Russian-born British contemporary artist. Her work encompasses drawing, photography, painting, performance and sound installation. She was elected a Royal Academician in 2025.

== Early life and education ==
Margarita Gluzberg was born in Moscow, Soviet Union, in 1968. After her father emigrated to the West, Gluzberg and her mother followed in 1979, settling in London. The transition from Soviet Russia to Britain has informed aspects of her artistic practice, particularly her interest in cultural memory and the relationship between personal and political histories.

She studied Fine Art at the Ruskin School of Art,University of Oxford, before completing an MA in Painting at the Royal College of Art. In 2004 she was awarded the Wingate Scholarship at the British School at Rome, where she undertook a six-month residency.

== Works ==
Gluzberg first became known for her detailed black and white large-scale drawings. Early drawing series include Moebius Cat (1999) and Hairstyles for the Great Depression (2009). The latter juxtaposes elaborate coiffures with the economic hardship and social anxieties of the interwar period.

She later expanded her practice to include photography, painting, installation, sound and performance. It often combines archival research, literary and cinematic references, and autobiographical material.

Her first solo exhibition, Funk of Terror into Psychic Bricks (2007) at the London gallery Paradise Row focused on large-scale pencil drawings of 1950s-inspired iconography, such as pin-up girls, record-players, lilies and boxing. Reviewing the exhibition for Frieze, Sam Thorne identified the relationship between memory, desire and reconstruction as central to the work, noting its combination of autobiographical references, political history and fictional narrative.

Her second solo exhibition at Paradise Row, The Money Plot (2008), featured paintings of luxury goods, the UBS London trading floor and the soaring cast ironwork of the covered markets in Leeds. The exhibition was described as "semiautobiographical" by Laura K. Jones in Artforum, as it continued Gluzberg's exploration of memory, autobiography and consumer culture.

In 2012, Gluzberg presented the exhibition Avenue des Gobelins, which took its title from Eugène Atget's photograph of Parisian shopfronts. Presenting the series Consumystic, the exhibition examined consumer culture and the relationship between material desire, commerce and visual spectacle. It comprised slide projections, video projection and platinum prints produced from black-and-white 35 mm film. In an interview with Dazed, Gluzberg said she drew on the analogue photographic techniques of the Surrealists, using multiple exposures to layer images of retail environments in order to transmit the same "warped desire" she identified in Atget's shopfront photographs.

In 2019, Gluzberg presented In Paradise, her first institutional solo exhibition, at Pushkin House in London. The exhibition featured a series of large-scale graphite drawings derived from Andrei Tarkovsky's film Stalker, which follows a journey through the restricted Zone to a room said to grant any wish. Gluzberg has described the exhibited works as "cinema experiments," made at night by projecting scenes from the film onto paper and recording the moving images in graphite; the resulting drawings reconfigure the film's imagery into abstract compositions.

Since 2021, Gluzberg has developed a body of works on canvas and paper of pastel sphere drawings using vintage coloured pencils and pastels, many dating from the 1950s and 1960s and sourced from Eastern Europe and the United States. Works from this series were exhibited at 'Proper Time' at Karsten Schubert (2022), and Alma Pearl in 2023 in the exhibition Otherwhere. Reviewing 'Otherwhere' for the Contemporary Art Society, Caroline Douglas wrote that the drawings were neither figurative nor geometric abstraction, but marked a deliberate move by Gluzberg to "separate herself from content, from a research-based methodology".

Some of the materials originate from defunct Soviet-era pencil factories. In an essay for the Drawing Room, Emily LaBarge discussed Gluzberg's use of Soviet-era pencils, describing the materials as historical traces within the drawings.

These concerns were also developed in Gluzberg's 2025 exhibition Implicate Factory Outlet at the London gallery Alma Pearl, which included drawings from the same series as well as her sound installation The Captive Bird Society.

== Sound Installations & Performances ==
The Captive Bird Society is a long-running, recurring sound art project and performance series. Originally performed at the MacVal Museum in Paris, an expanded version was commissioned for the official programme of the Nuit Blanche in 2009. The project developed into an ongoing research-based work titled Captive Bird Society, centred on vinyl recordings of birdsong and questions surrounding nature, technology and historical memory. The work has included performances at Wysing Arts Centre and an Artangel commission presented as part of Elizabeth Price's exhibition Slowdans in 2020.

Gluzberg's bilingualism influenced her performance lecture 'Simultaneous Translation Through a Mouth Without Organs' at Tate Britain.

== Teaching ==
Alongside her artistic practice, Gluzberg has taught at the Royal College of Art and the Royal Academy Schools, where she was appointed Senior Lecturer at The Royal Academy Schools, Royal Academy of Arts in 2018.
