= Edward Fisher (engraver) =

Irish mezzotint engraver

Edward Fisher (1730–c.1785) was an Irish-born mezzotint engraver, mostly of portraits, working in London.

== Life ==
Fisher was born in Ireland in 1730. He was originally a hatter, but then took up engraving and went to London. He became a member of the Incorporated Society of Artists in 1766, and exhibited there fourteen times between 1761 and 1776. His earliest dated print is 1758, and his latest 1781. He was living in Leicester Square in 1761, and moved to Ludgate Street in 1778. It is said that Joshua Reynolds called him "injudiciously exact" for finishing the unimportant parts of his plate too highly.

He engraved more than sixty portraits, including George, earl of Albemarle, after Reynolds : Robert Brown, after Mason Chamberlin; William Pitt, Earl of Chatham, after Richard Brompton; Colley Cibber, after Jean-Baptiste van Loo; Christian VII of Denmark, after Nathaniel Dance; David Garrick, after Reynolds; Simon, earl Harcourt, after Hunter; Roger Long, after Benjamin Wilson; Hugh, Earl of Northumberland, and Elizabeth, countess of Northumberland, after Reynolds; Paul Sandby, after Francis Cotes; Laurence Sterne, after Reynolds; and the following fancy subjects: Lady in Flowered Dress, after Hoare; Hope Nursing Love after Reynolds; his Heads from "Vicar of Wakefield, ten plates engraved from his own designs, were published in 1776.

After his death, in about 1785, most of his copper plates were dispersed among several print-sellers, and in some cases altered.

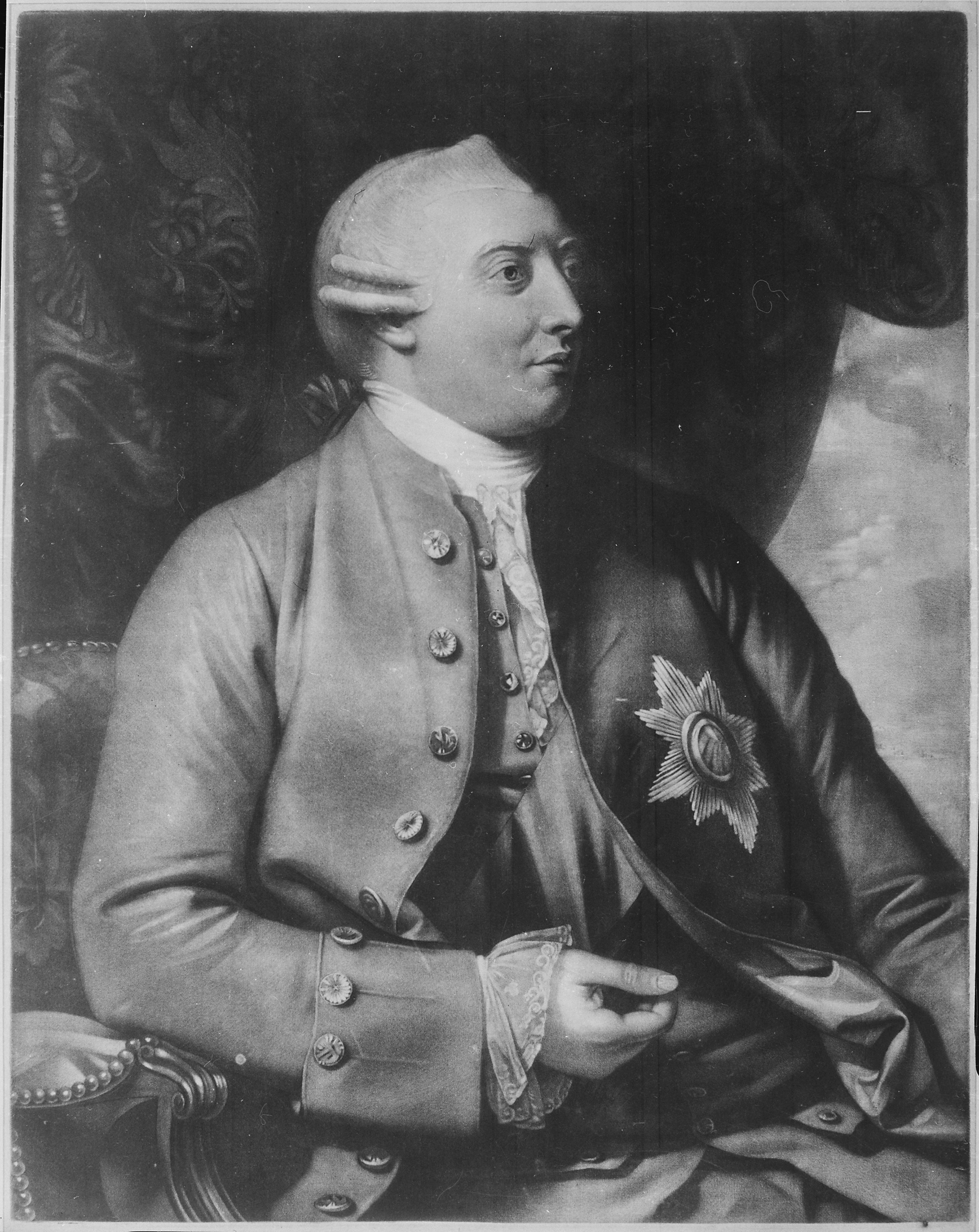
George III after Benjamin West

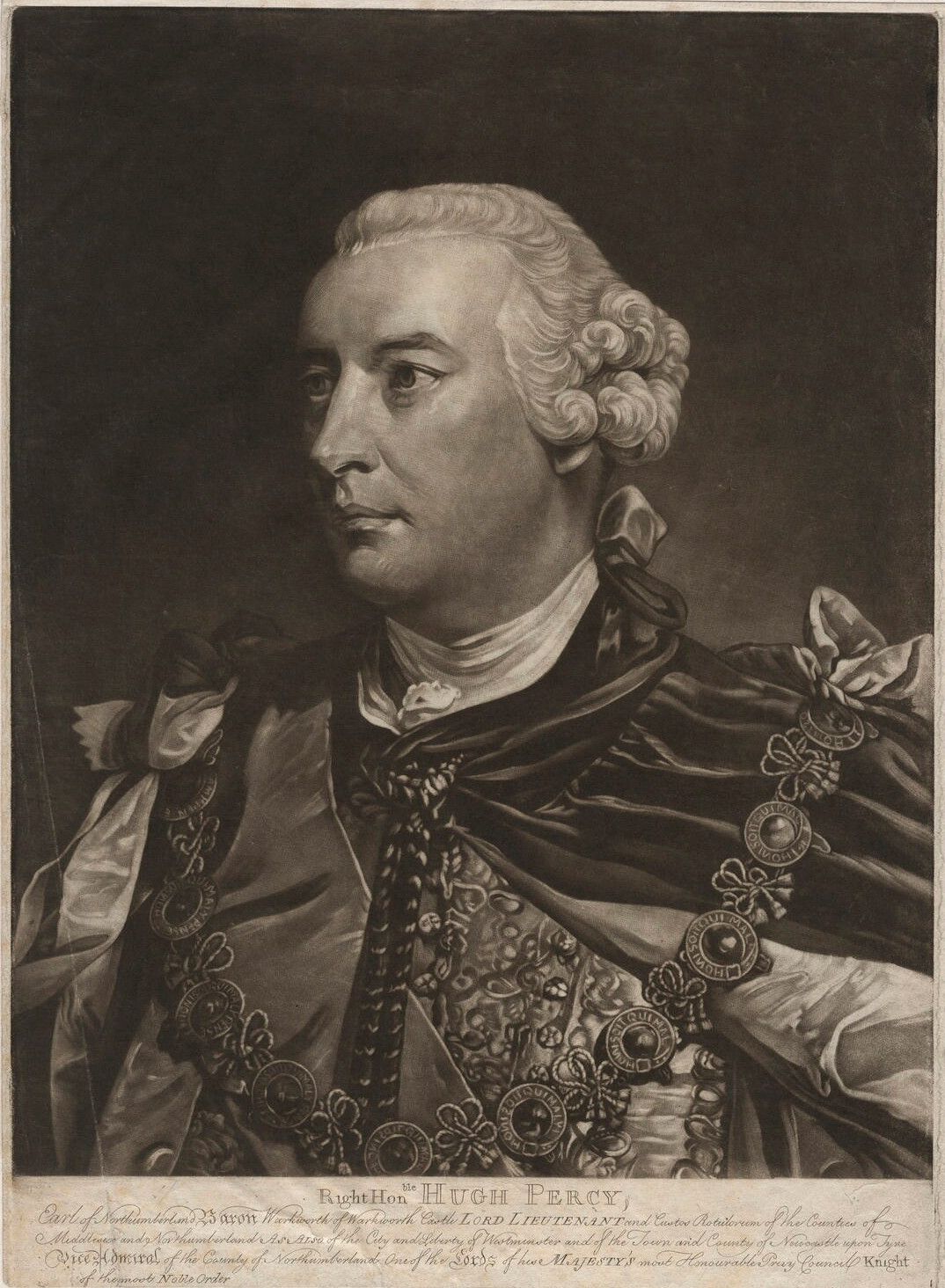
1st Duke of Northumberland after Joshua Reynolds

== Sources ==
This article incorporates text from a publication now in the public domain: This article incorporates text from a publication now in the public domain: "Fisher, Edward (1730-1785?)". Dictionary of National Biography. London: Smith, Elder & Co. 1885–1900.
