= Edward Burch =

English gem engraver, medalist, and wax modeller (1730–1814)

Edward Burch RA
- Edward Burch from The Academicians of the Royal Academy, 1771–72
- Born: Edward Burch; 1730; London, England, Kingdom of Great Britain
- Died: 11 February 1814 (aged 83–84)
- Education: Royal Academy Schools (2 September 1769–)
- Known for: Sculpture; gem engraving
- Children: Henry Jacob Burch
- Elected: Royal Academy of Arts (1771) ARA: 27 August 1770 RA: 11 February 1771 Librarian: 1794 – 11 February 1814
- Website: Edward Burch – Art UK

Edward Burch RA (1730–1814) was an English artist and Royal Academician known as a gem engraver, medalist and sculpture, particularly of wax modelling.

Burch first worked as a waterman on the Thames. Self-taught miniaturist and seal-engraver.

In 1788 Burch was appointed engraver to King George III and the Duke of York. He also modelled wax portraits for James Tassie and for Josiah Wedgwood.

Burch served as the librarian of the Royal Academy of Arts from 1794 until his death on the 11 February 1814.

== Collections ==
- Royal Academy of Arts
- Royal Collection
- Fitzwilliam Museum
- National Portrait Gallery, London
- Yale Center for British Art
