= Spencer de Grey =

British architect

Spencer de Grey CBE RA RIBA
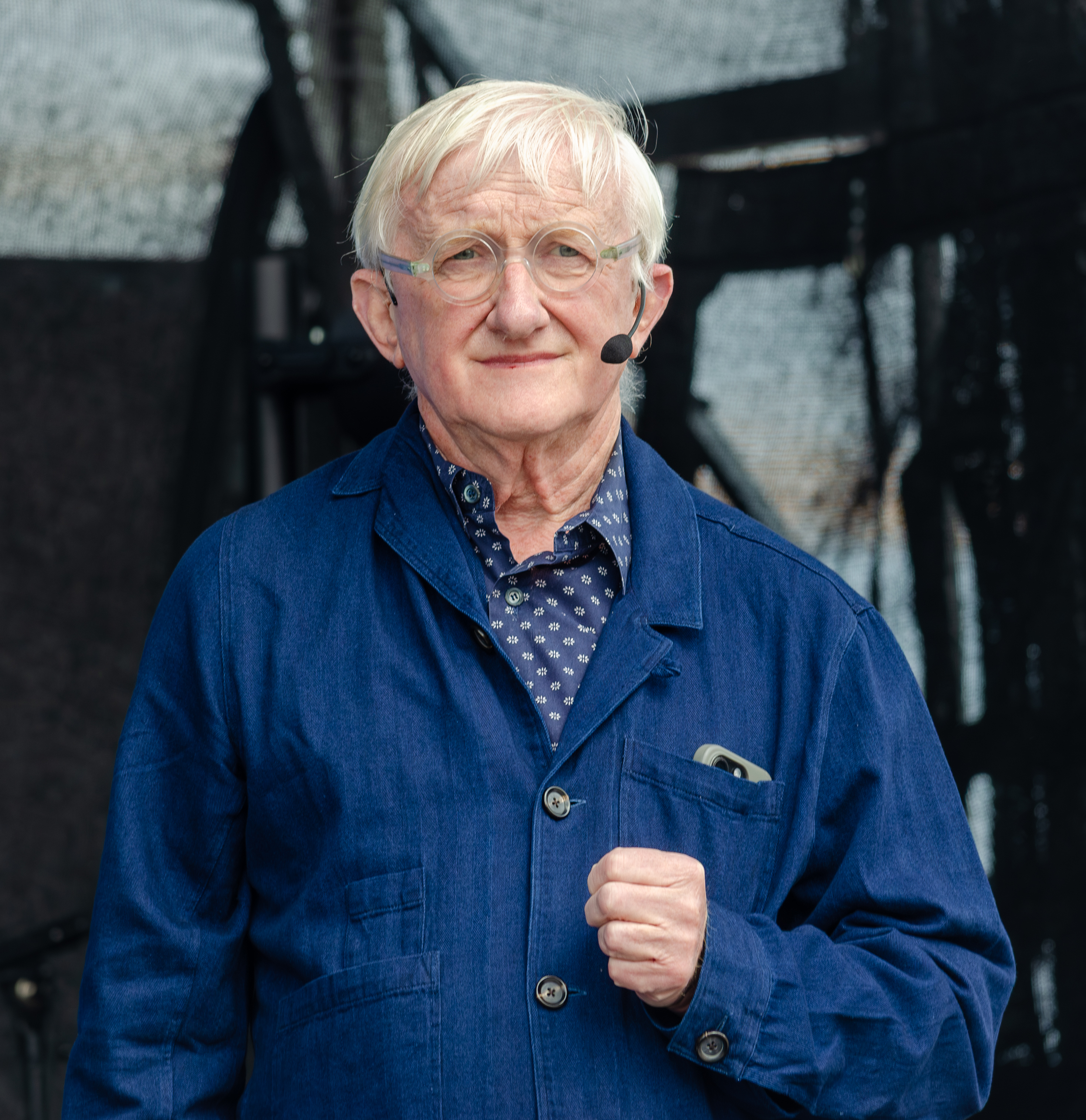
- Born: 1944 (age 81–82); Farnham, Surrey, England
- Occupation: Architect
- Practice: Foster + Partners
- Buildings: Stansted Airport; The Sage Gateshead; Great Court, British Museum

Spencer Thomas de Grey, CBE RA RIBA (born 1944) is a British architect.

== Early and personal life ==
He was born in 1944 in Farnham, Surrey, son of artists Capt. Sir Roger de Grey and Flavia Hatt Irwin.

== Early career ==
He studied architecture at Cambridge University under Sir Leslie Martin. On leaving Cambridge in 1969, he worked for the London Borough of Merton on one of the first middle schools in the United Kingdom. He became a registered architect in 1969 and a chartered architect in 1993.

== Career at Foster Associates (later Foster + Partners) ==
He joined Foster Associates in 1973, continuing his work in education on the Palmerston Special School in Liverpool. He then worked on the Hammersmith Centre before, in 1979, setting up Foster Associates' office in Hong Kong to build the Hong Kong and Shanghai Bank. In 1981 he returned to London to become the director in charge of Stansted Airport, which he saw through to completion in 1991. During this period, he also worked on the unbuilt BBC Radio Centre and was responsible for the Sackler Galleries at the Royal Academy of Arts in London.

He was made a partner in 1991 and since then he has overseen a wide range of projects, including Cambridge Law Faculty, the Commerzbank Headquarters in Frankfurt, the Great Court at the British Museum, the Great Glasshouse at the National Botanic Garden of Wales, the World Squares for All Masterplan together with the implementation of its first phase at Trafalgar Square, the redevelopment of Dresden Hauptbahnhof, The Sage Gateshead (Music Centre), HM Treasury in Whitehall and nine City Academy schools in the UK.

He is responsible for a number of projects in the USA including the masterplan and first phase of the Boston Museum of Fine Arts, the Winspear Opera House in Dallas, Avery Fisher Hall at New York's Lincoln Center and the competition winning scheme for the National Portrait Gallery courtyard at the Smithsonian, Washington DC.

In May 2007, Foster + Partners restructured with external investor 3i and the new executive board included Lord Foster as Chairman, Mouzhan Majidi as Chief Executive, and original shareholders Spencer de Grey and David Nelson as Heads of Design.

In August 2026, two years after stepping down as a director, de Grey retired from Foster + Partners after 52 years with the firm.

== Extracurricular activities ==
He lectures widely, is an architectural advisor for the Royal Botanical Gardens in Kew, chairman of the Building Centre Trust and was a visiting lecturer at the Royal College of Art's Curating Contemporary Art course. He is chairman of the Cambridge University School of Architecture Advisory Board, and was elected Visiting Professor of Architecture from January 2010 until September 2011. He was elected a Royal Academician in December 2008.

== Honours ==
de Grey was appointed a Commander of the Order of the British Empire (CBE) in the 1997 Birthday Honours for services to architecture.
