= Flavia Irwin =

British Painter

Flavia Irwin, Lady de Grey RA (15 December 1916 – 1 August 2009) was a British painter and Royal Academician.

She was born on 15 December 1916 in London to Lieutenant-Colonel Clinton de la Cherois Irwin, M.C., of the Manchester Regiment, and his wife Everilda, daughter of Hatt Cook, of Hartford Hall, Cheshire. Irwin studied at Ruskin School of Drawing and Fine Art, and Chelsea College of Art and Design, where her teachers included Henry Moore, Graham Sutherland and Robert Medley.

Irwin taught general design at Medway College of Art and the Royal College of Art, and ultimately became the head of decorative arts at City and Guilds Art School. She was elected to the Royal Academy of Arts 1996 and was also an Honorary Member of the Royal West of England Academy.

Her work is included in a number of private collections in both the UK and the US, including the Government Art Collection and the Walker Art Gallery. She was regularly shown at the Royal Academy's Summer Exhibition.

She married Sir Roger de Grey in 1942 and was also known by her title of Lady De Grey. They had three children, including the architect Spencer de Grey. Irwin died on 1 August 2009.
