= John Baker (artist) =

English painter

John Baker RA
- Born: 1726
- Died: 30 April 1771 (aged 44–45)
- Known for: Flower painting
- Elected: Royal Academy of Arts

John Baker RA (1726 – 30 April 1771) was an English flowerpainter.

== Life ==
Baker was mainly employed in the decoration of coaches. His biographer Edward Edwards, in his Anecdotes of Painters (1808), remarks on the effect of fashion in this area of art, and on Baker's high reputation in it, in his day. On the foundation of the Royal Academy John Baker was elected a member.
