= Roger de Grey =

English painter

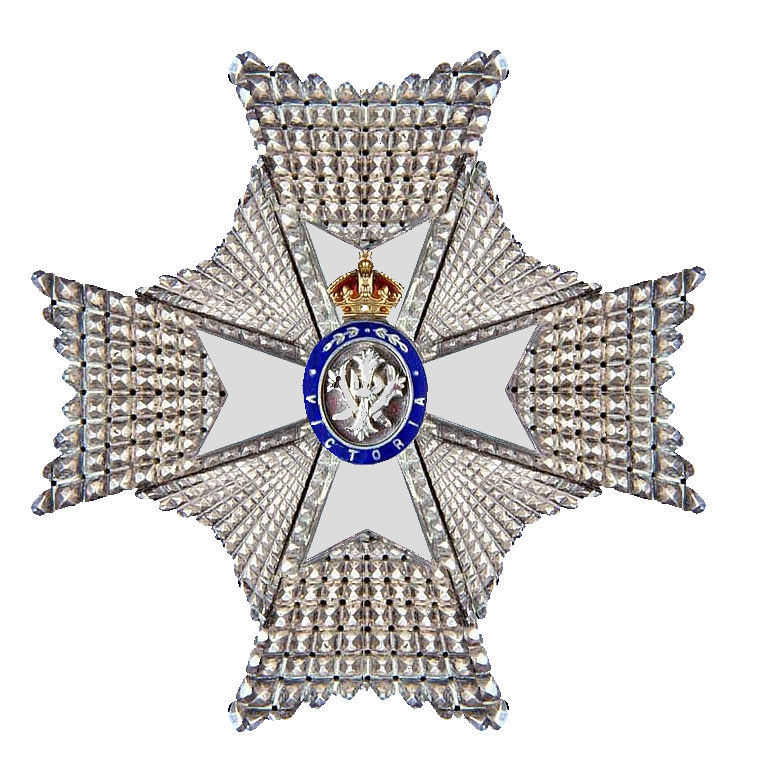
KCVO breast star

Sir Roger de Grey, KCVO PRA (18 April 1918 – 14 February 1995) was a British landscape painter. From 1984 to 1993 he served as President of the Royal Academy.

== Early life and career ==
De Grey was the second son (and youngest of three children) of Royal Navy Lieutenant-Commander Nigel de Grey (1886–1951) and his wife Florence, daughter of Spencer William Gore and a descendant of Arthur Gore, 2nd Earl of Arran and John Ponsonby, 4th Earl of Bessborough. Nigel de Grey was a grandson of Thomas de Grey, 5th Baron Walsingham, like his wife, descended from the 4th Earl of Bessborough, and was also descended from the Barons Rendlesham and Viscounts Dillon. He studied art at Chelsea Polytechnic from 1936–1939. During World War II he was commissioned in the Royal Armoured Corps. After the War he returned to Chelsea to complete his studies from 1946–1947. His tutors included Ceri Richards, Robert Medley, Harold Sandys Williamson and Raymond Coxon. De Grey was a landscape artist, often working in Kent and in France, painting outdoors and then finishing his work in his studio. His first solo exhibition was at the Thomas Agnew & Sons Gallery in 1954. Later he exhibited at the Tate Gallery and Royal Academy, as well as internationally. His paintings are still sought after by collectors.

== Teaching and administration ==
Arms of Sir Roger de Grey

De Grey had a long and distinguished career as an art educator: a Lecturer of King's College, Newcastle upon Tyne (1947–1951), then Master of Painting (1951–1953), at the Royal College of Art, he was Senior Tutor, and later Reader in Painting from 1953–1973. From 1973–1995 he was the Principal of the City and Guilds of London Art School. From 1971, he was a Trustee of Paintings in Hospitals and enabled the charity to acquire works by Royal Academicians. He was also a Trustee of the National Portrait Gallery from 1984 to 1995. In 1962, Roger de Grey was elected an Associate member of the Royal Academy, becoming a full Academician in 1969. From 1976 until 1984, he was the Treasurer of the RA under Sir Hugh Casson. De Grey succeeded Casson as President in 1984. Roger de Grey was elected Senior RA in October 1993, the year he stepped down from being President. He was elected an honorary member of the Royal West of England Academy of Art (RWA) in 1994.

== Family ==
A great-nephew of the 7th Baron Walsingham, de Grey was knighted in 1991 for "services to British art". The Royal Academy provided an exhibition of his work in memoriam in 1996. The Tate Gallery and Arts Council of Great Britain hold several examples of his work.

In 1942, he married Flavia Hatt RA, (née Irwin), also a notable artist, who died in London in 1995, aged 77. Sir Roger and Lady de Grey had three children: Spencer, Robert and Emilia.

== See also ==
- House of Grey
- Royal Victorian Order

Cultural offices
Preceded by Sir Hugh; Casson	President of the Royal Academy; 1984–1993	Succeeded by Sir Philip Dowson
