= John Francis Rigaud =

British painter (1742–1810)

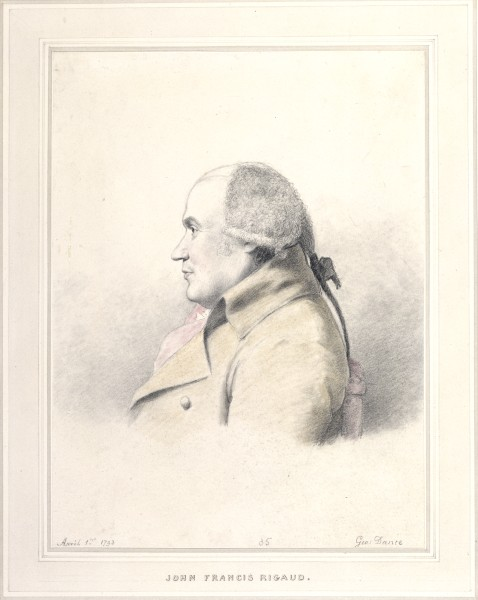
John Francis Rigaud by George Dance (1793)

John Francis Rigaud RA (18 May 1742 – 6 December 1810) was a British painter who specialised in history painting and portrait painting. Of French descent, he was born in Turin and spent most of his career in England.

== Early life ==
Rigaud was born in Turin on 18 May 1742 and baptised on 9 September. He was the second son of James Dutilh or Rigaud and Jeanne Françoise Guiraudet. His father came from a family of Protestant merchants; his grandfather Jacques Dutilh had fled from Lyon to Geneva with his family after the revocation of the Edict of Nantes. Jacques died on the journey, and his widow assumed her maiden name – Rigaud – by which the family became known. John had a brother Jacques Etienne Rigaud born 16 Jan 1741 and died 7 Mar 1767 at Turin.

Having demonstrated an artistic ability, Rigaud studied with Claudio Francesco Beaumont of Turin, a historical painter to the king of Sardinia. He left Beaumont to travel to Italy and study painting in Florence and Bologna, where he was made a member of the Accademia Clementina in 1766. He then travelled to Rome, but had to return home due to family considerations. In January 1768, he set off once again, this time to Piacenza, Parma, Bologna, and then, once again, to Rome. He settled there and studied the city's art, particularly the old masters, and participated in life-drawing schools. There, he produced what the Dictionary of National Biography describes as "one of his most important works": Hercules Resting from his Labours. While in Rome, Rigaud became friends with the Swedish sculptor Johan Tobias Sergel and the Irish painter James Barry.

== London ==
In April 1770, he and Barry travelled together to Florence, Bologna, and Turin. Rigaud then spent a short time in Paris before leaving for London in December 1771. He exhibited his Hercules at the Royal Academy in 1772 and was elected an associate of the Academy in the same year. Also in 1772 he lodged at Mr. Luther's, 20 Frith Street (now no. 25), Soho.

While Rigaud consistently exhibited paintings at the Royal Academy – showing a total of 155 works there between 1772 and 1815 – "his most lucrative and engrossing employment was decorative painting for the town and country houses of the nobility, including Lord Gower, Lord Sefton, and the Earl of Aylesford". Some of his exhibits at the Academy were studies for ceiling paintings, and in 1797 he showed three works described as "specimen[s] of fresco painting on Portland stone. The architect William Chambers offered him work in London at Melbourne House in Piccadilly (1772 and 1774) and at Somerset House (1780). He also helped decorate the Common Council Chamber of the Guildhall in London (1794) and Trinity House (1796). According to the Dictionary of National Biography, all these works were "executed in the fashionable Italian style of G. B. Cipriani and Biagio Rebecca, being mostly classical figures and imitations of bas-reliefs". His works at the Guildhall, representing "Providence", "Innocence", "Wisdom" and "Happiness" were painted at the expense of Alderman John Boydell. They did not last: a guidebook to the building, published in 1819, recorded that "these Paintings never dried perfectly and turned black. They exist no longer..."

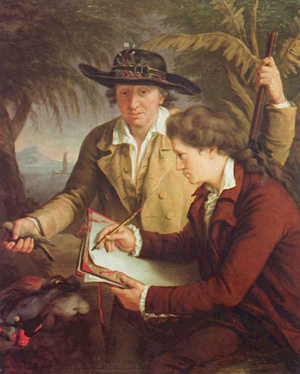
Johann Reinhold Forster and Georg Forster in Tahiti, by John Francis Rigaud 1780.

Rigaud also produced history paintings, such as Entry of the Black Prince into London with his Royal Prisoner (1775), and several works for the galleries of Thomas Macklin and Robert Bowyer, and for the Shakespeare Gallery of John Boydell in the late 1780s. According to the Dictionary of National Biography, "his historical paintings were not well received". He was also commissioned to paint two religious works: a Descent from the Cross for the Roman Catholic Sardinian Embassy Chapel in London in 1780 and a fresco of the Ascension for the newly rebuilt church of St Martin Outwich in 1797. This last painting soon fell into poor condition and was destroyed during alterations to the building in 1827. His "descent from the Cross," painted in 1780 is now visible in the Church of St Anselm and St Cecilia which was built after the destruction of the Sardinian Embassy Chapel during the Gordon riots.

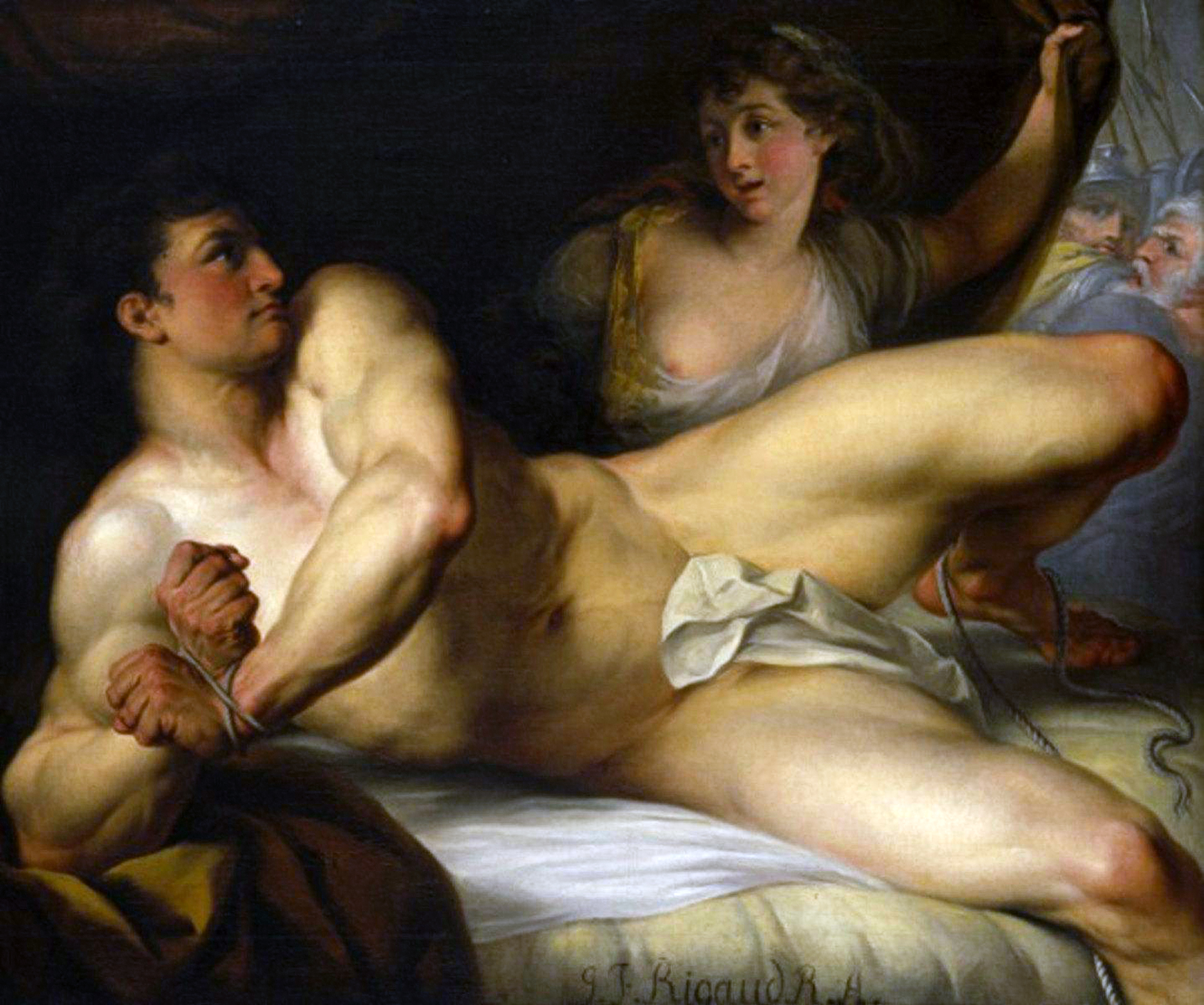
Samson Breaking his Bands (1784)

Rigaud was also a portrait painter, and painted a group portrait of the artists Francesco Bartolozzi, Agostino Carlini, and Giovanni Battista Cipriani in 1777 and another of Sir Joshua Reynolds, Sir William Chambers, and Joseph Wilton in 1782. He also painted a series of naval heroes, including Lord Nelson. According to the Dictionary of National Biography, his portraits "tend to be strongly characterized and boldly conceived, even occasionally eccentric".

On 10 February 1784 Rigaud was formally elected to the Royal Society, with Samson Breaking his Bands as his diploma work. In 1795, he was appointed historical painter to Gustavus IV of Sweden and was made a member of the Royal Academy of Stockholm. However, after 1800, according to the Dictionary of National Biography, his career as a painter seems to have declined. He translated Leonardo da Vinci's A Treatise on Painting (1802) and he restored painted decorations such as those in Greenwich Hospital and Montague House.

== Family ==
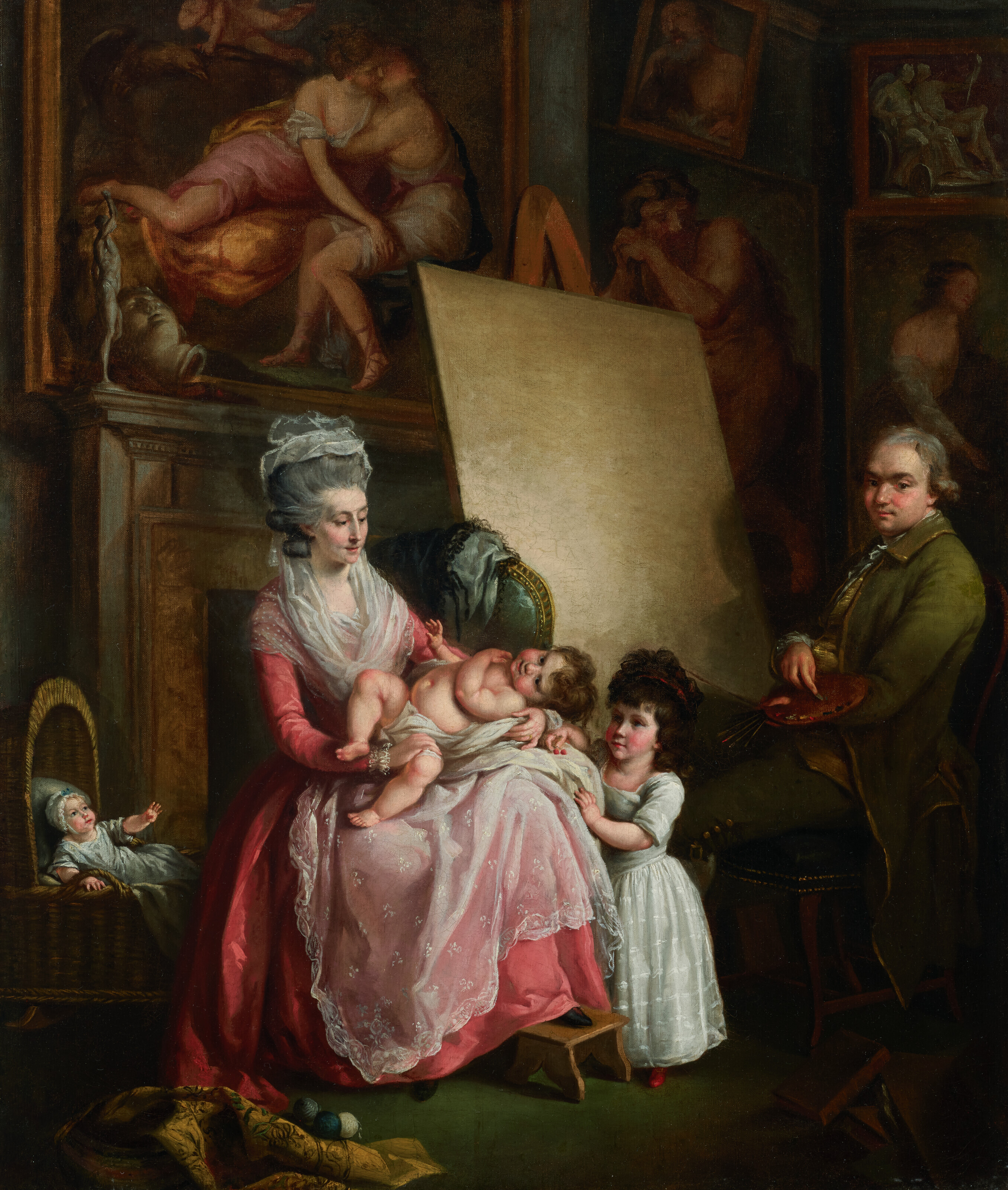
Portrait of the artist with his wife Mary Williams and children (Mary, Stephen and Betsy), in his studio, 1782.

Rigaud married Mary Williams (1740? – 1808) on 21 July 1774. They had three daughters and one son, Stephen Francis Dutilh Rigaud, who also became a painter.

After his wife's death, Rigaud lived with his son.

== Death ==
He died from apoplexy on 6 December 1810 at Packington Hall in Warwickshire and was buried in St James' Church, Great Packington.

== Gallery ==
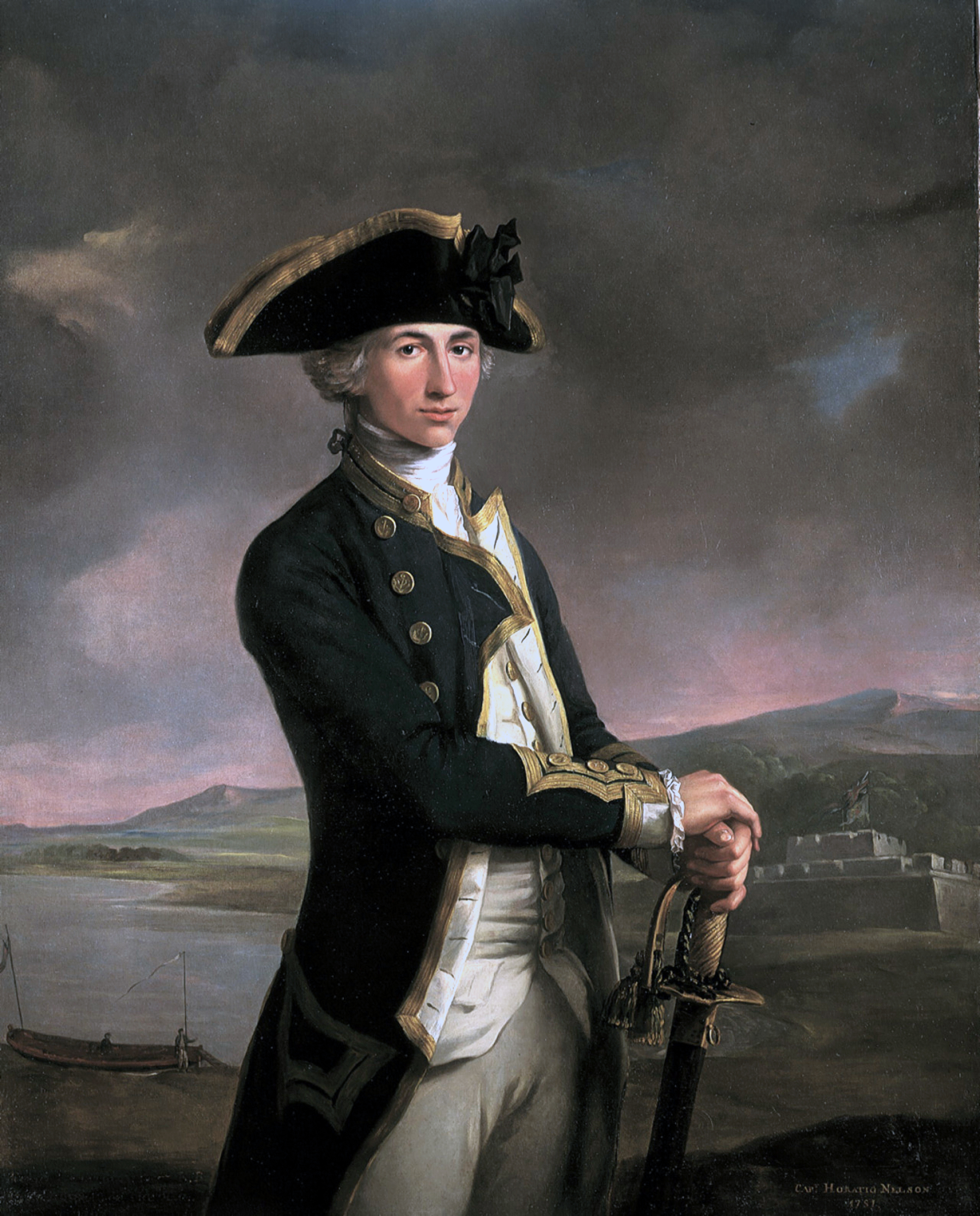
Portrait of Horatio Nelson, 1781

== Bibliography ==
- Cust, L. H. and Martin Myrone. "John Francis Rigaud" DNB. Oxford Dictionary of National Biography. Oxford University Press. 2004. Retrieved on 2 February 2008.
- The first edition of this text is available at Wikisource: "Rigaud, John Francis" . Dictionary of National Biography. London: Smith, Elder & Co. 1885–1900.
