= Mason Chamberlin =

English painter (1727–1787)

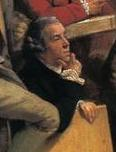
Chamberlin from The Portraits of the Academicians of the Royal Academy by Johan Zoffany

Mason Chamberlin RA (1727 – 20 January 1787) was an English portrait painter, who was one of the founding members of the Royal Academy in 1768. He was a student of Francis Hayman. He is perhaps best remembered for his portrait of Benjamin Franklin.

== Life ==
Chamberlin was a pupil of Francis Hayman. In 1768 he was one of the founding members of the Royal Academy. He exhibited 50 works at the academy between 1769 and 1786. All were portraits. The subjects of most of them are unnamed in the catalogues but in 1771 he showed a full-length painting of Prince Edward and Princess Augusta and in 1774 one of Catharine Macaulay. He also showed 22 works at the Society of Artists and two at the Free Society of Artists. His address is given as 7, Stuart Street, Spitalfields in the academy catalogues and from 1785 as 10, Bartlett's Buildings.

== Franklin portrait ==
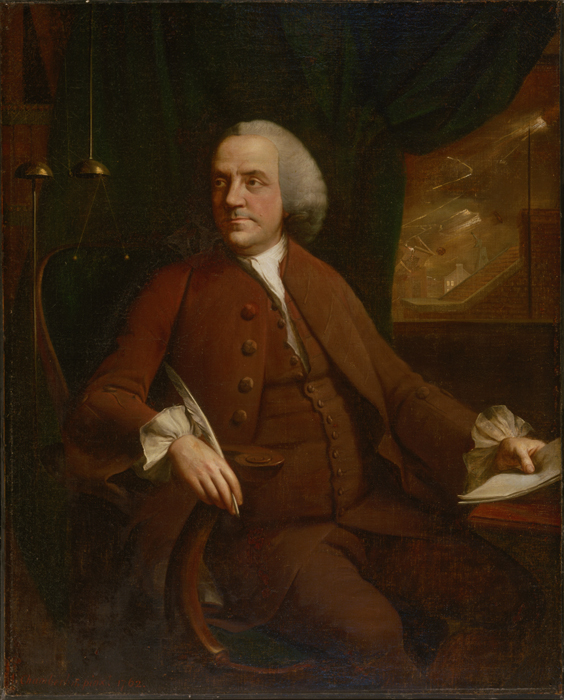
Chamberlin's portrait of Benjamin Franklin (1762)

He is perhaps best known for a portrait of Benjamin Franklin, commissioned by wealthy Virginian landowner and friend of Franklin's in London, Colonel Philip Ludwell III, and painted from life in 1762. It shows Franklin seated in his study with lightning striking outside the window in the background, and a lightning rod on his house. He looks to the left at a set of lightning bells (a device of his own invention), which would ring to signal when lightning was striking the rod. Franklin could then use the electricity in order to perform his experiments.

Later in 1762 (or early 1763) a popular mezzotint was made after it (possibly as part of the agreement between Chamberlin and Ludwell), by the Irish-born engraver Edward Fisher (1730–1785). Franklin's son William ordered 100 copies to sell in America, 18 of which Franklin distributed himself, mostly to friends in New England such as Mather Byles, Ezra Stiles, and his niece's husband, Jonathan Williams. This was Franklin's favorite print during the time, partially because of the accurate likeness.

The original painting is owned by the Philadelphia Museum of Art. Franklin's son William also commissioned a replica of this painting to be made, for Franklin to give him as a gift to hang in the dining room of William's new home — the copy is presumed to have been sent to America, but has since been destroyed.

== Death ==
He died at Bartlett's Buildings, Holborn, on 20 January 1787.

== Family ==
His son, also called Mason, was a prolific painter who exhibited 68 landscapes in London between 1780 and 1827, of which 58 were shown at the Royal Academy.
