= Cumbria Museum Consortium =

Grouping of museum organisations in England

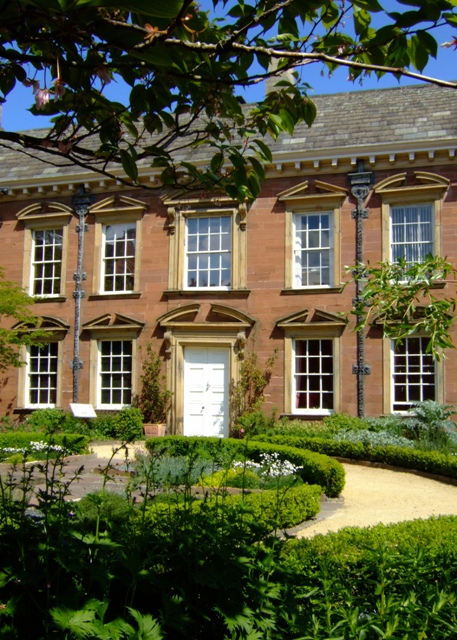
Tullie House Museum and Art Gallery, Carlisle: one of the three members of the consortium, and its administrative base.

Cumbria Museum Consortium is a grouping of museum organisations in Cumbria, north west England, which receives funding from Arts Council England as a "Major Partner Museum".

== Membership ==
The members of the consortium are Lakeland Arts (which operates Blackwell, the Arts & Crafts House near Windermere, Abbot Hall Art Gallery and the Museum of Lakeland Life & Industry in Kendal, and Windermere Jetty, scheduled to re-open in 2018, on Windermere); the Wordsworth Trust (which operates Dove Cottage and the adjacent Wordsworth Museum in Grasmere); and the Tullie House Museum and Art Gallery in Carlisle.

== Major Partner Museum funding ==
In 2015-2018 the consortium was allocated £3,135,495 by Arts Council England, a reduction of 5.5% in real terms compared to its 2012-2015 funding.

== Cumbrian cultural learning networks ==
The Consortium supports a programme of Cumbrian cultural learning networks, covering the county of Cumbria in three geographical areas: the Lakeland Museums Education Network (LMEN), The Cumbria Coast Learning Network (CCLN) and CONNECT Cumbria, which serves the North of Cumbria and the Eden Valley. The networks "support lifelong learning in its broadest sense, providing opportunities for people of all ages to engage with culture in a meaningful and appropriate way".

== Treasures of Cumbria ==
The Treasures of Cumbria website is a project of the Consortium, and encourages residents or visitors to contribute to "an online space for people to record and share what they treasure about Cumbria".
