= Windermere Jetty: Museum of Boats, Steam and Stories =

Museum in Bowness-on-Windermere, Cumbria, UK

Coordinates: 54°22′15.33″N 2°55′18.02″W

Windermere Jetty Museum of Boats, Steam and Stories

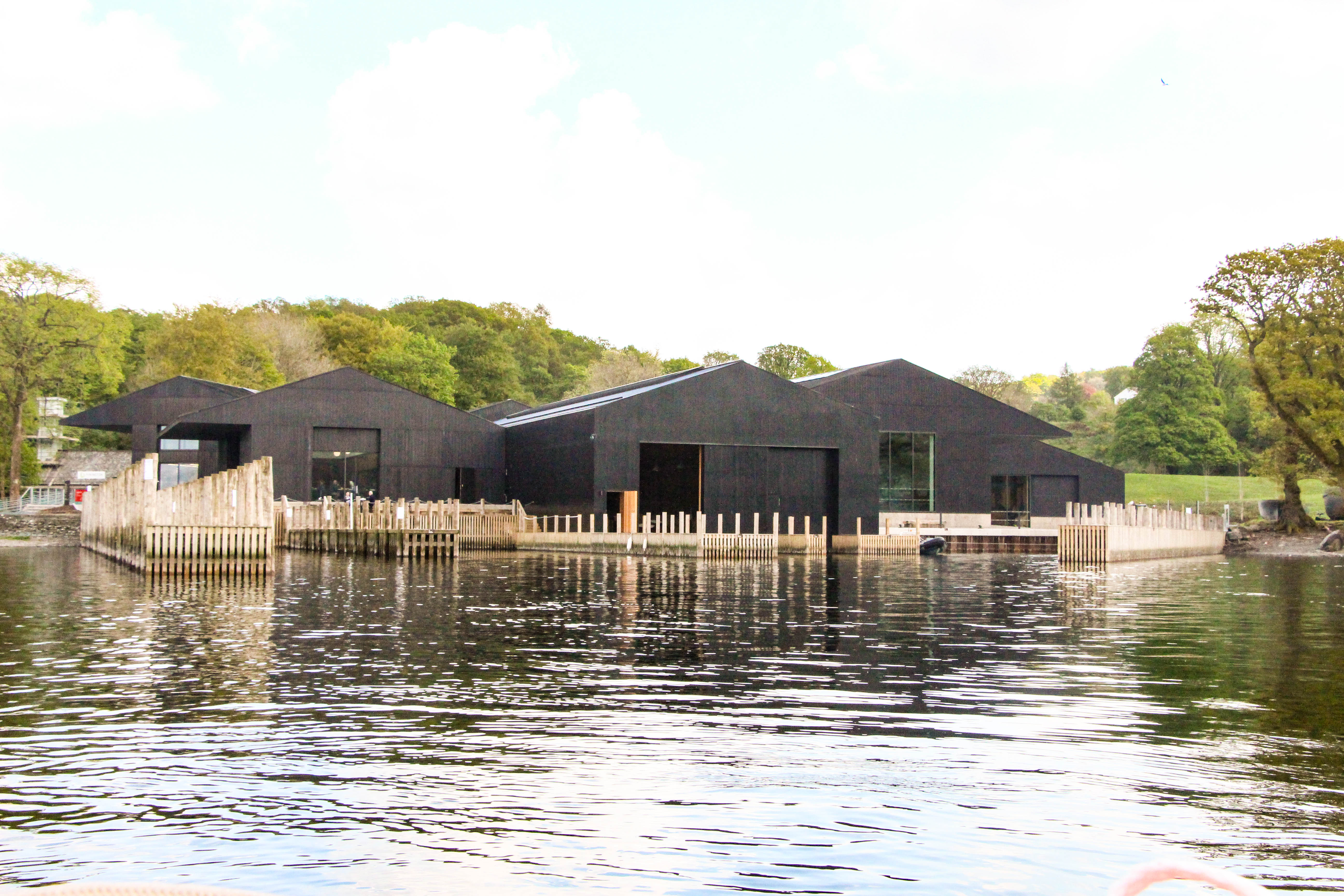
- Windermere Jetty from the water

- Location in South Lakeland Location in Cumbria
- Former name: Windermere Steamboat Museum
- Established: 1977
- Location: Windermere, Cumbria
- Key holdings: Steamboats and yachts
- Founder: George Pattinson
- Website: www.windermerejetty.org

Windermere Jetty: Museum of Boats, Steam and Stories (formerly Windermere Steamboat Museum) is a museum on the eastern shore of Windermere between Bowness-on-Windermere and the town of Windermere in Cumbria, England. It reopened in March 2019 after 12 years' closure and redevelopment work.

== History and media appearance ==
Windermere Steamboat Museum was opened in 1977 on the former Sand and Gravel Wharf on the eastern shore of Windermere, and was based on the collection built up by George Pattinson, a local builder and boat collector. It was operated by the Windermere Nautical Trust charity.

The original Windermere Steamboat Museum had a collection of a number of historically important steamboats, motor boats, yachts, and other important craft. This included the oldest mechanically powered boat in the world, SL Dolly (c.1850), and some of the finest steam launches from Windermere's long history of steam. Most luxurious was SL Branksome (1896), with its original velvet seats and marble wash hand basin; SL Raven (1871) was the cargo ship that took coal and other commodities to the settlements around the lake; and TSSY Esperance (1869) was the boat that Henry Schneider used to go to work in Barrow via Lakeside. The museum was able to boast that most of the steamboats were floating and still in full working order.

In 2007, the museum was closed to the general public when it was taken over by the Lakeland Arts Trust, a local charity (now Lakeland Arts) which also runs Abbot Hall Art Gallery, Blackwell and the Museum of Lakeland Life & Industry. Eleven of the Pattinson collection of boats were transferred to the Lakeland Arts Trust in 2007 under Acceptance in lieu arrangements, and the Windermere Nautical Trust, which had built up further collections, merged with Lakeland Arts in 2009.

In December 2011, the Lakeland Arts Trust announced that would redevelop the site and create a series of new buildings to house the boats and a conservation workshop where they would be restored and maintained. The museum, designed by Carmody Groarke, reopened under the new name "Windermere Jetty: Museum of Boats, Steam and Stories" in March 2019 with an official opening ceremony held on 8 April 2019 attended by HRH Prince Charles.

It appeared as the venue of BBC One’s Antiques Roadshow in February 2021, filmed in 2020.

== Collection ==
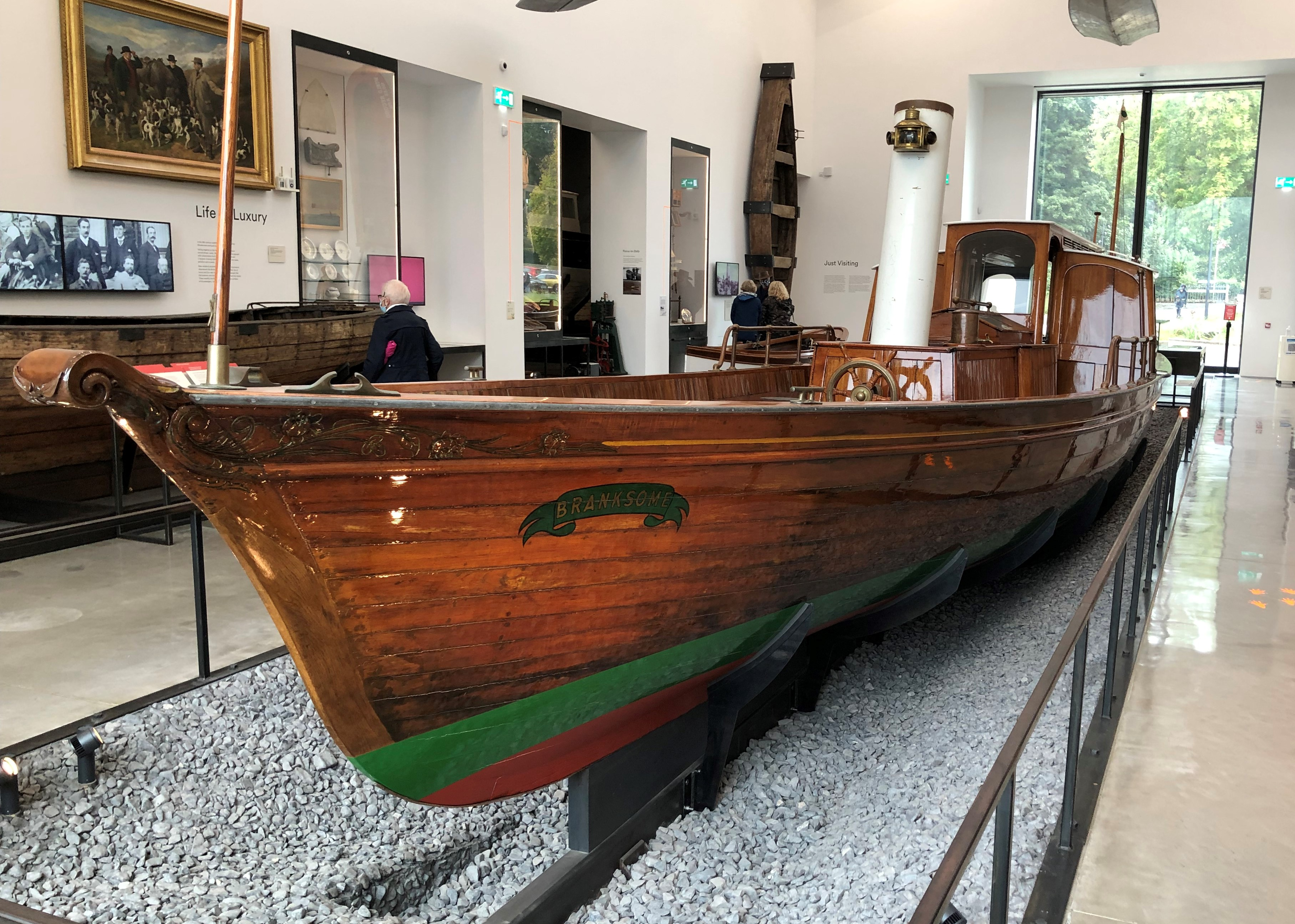
Steam launch Branksome

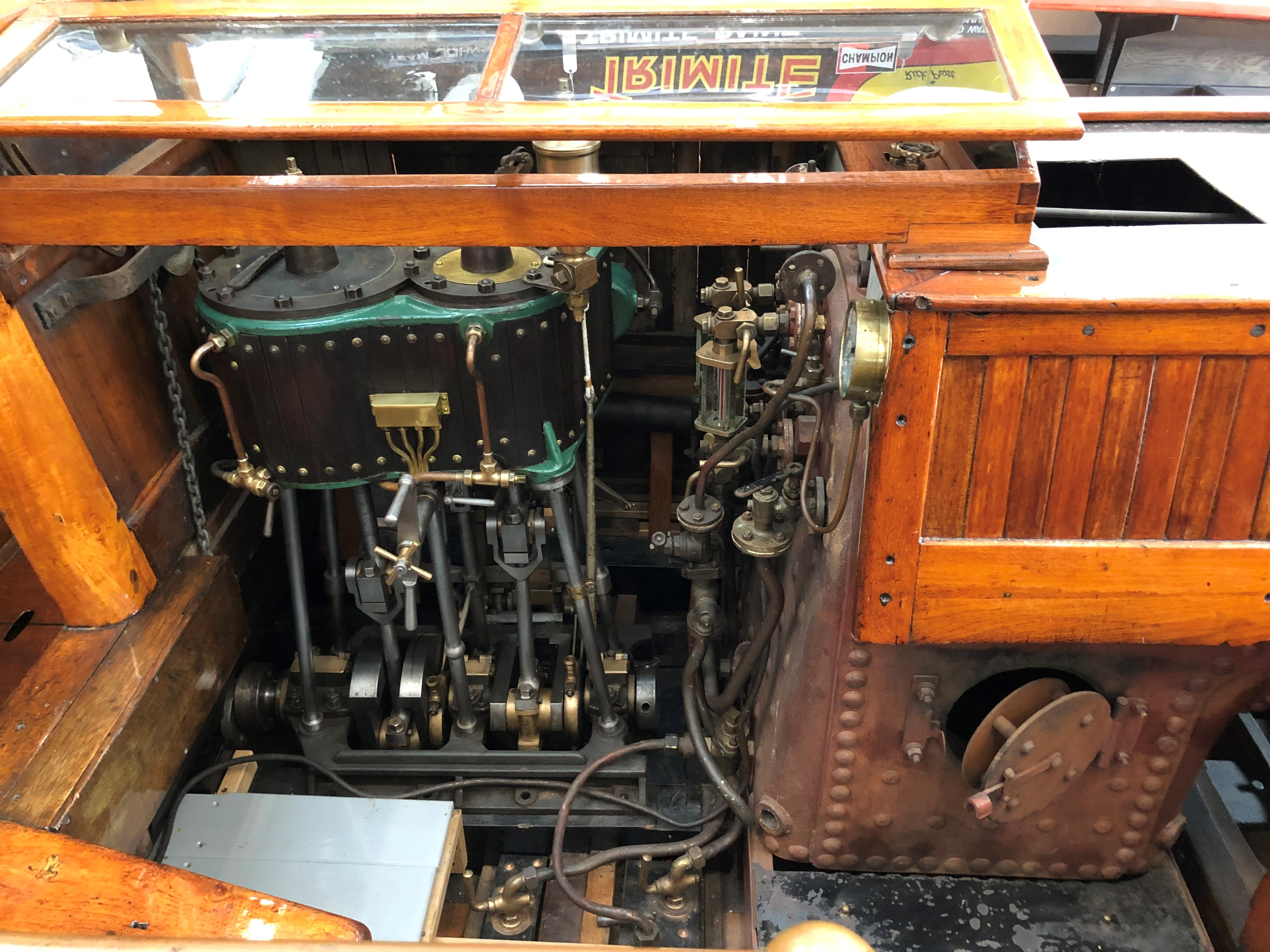
Branksome's two cylinder compound engine.

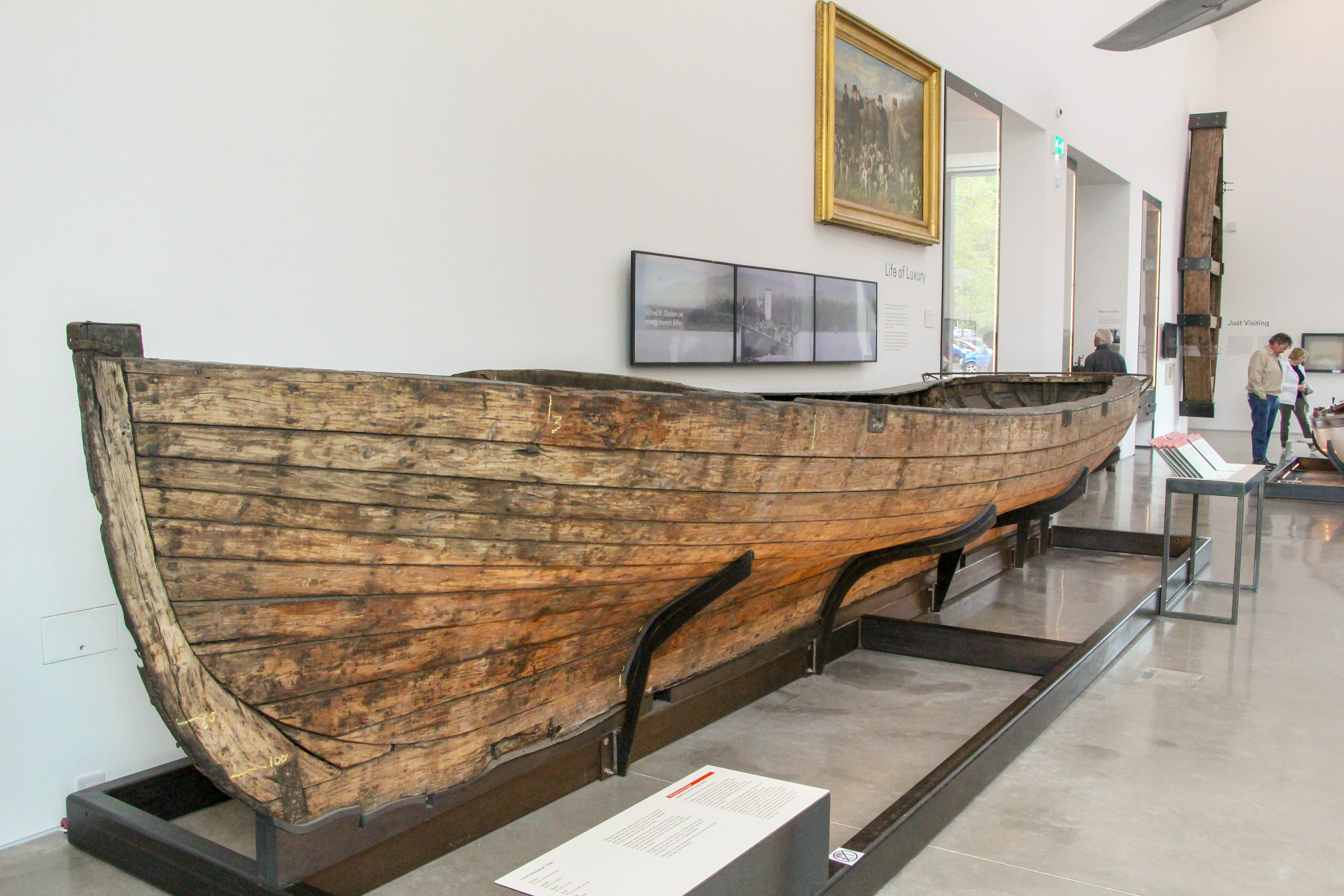
Margaret, the oldest surviving sailing yacht in the UK.

The Museum's collection of boats comprises 40 boats covering the history of steam launches, sailing and other boats on Windermere from the late 18th century up to the present. Four of the boats in the museum's collection are in the National Historic Fleet. They are:

- Steam launch Branksome was launched as Lily in 1896. She was built by George Brockbank of carvel construction in teak. She still has the original compound steam engine. She was fitted out to a very high standard with velvet upholstery and walnut panelling. She has an example of the "Windermere kettle" – a device that used steam from the boiler to bring water to the boil in around ten seconds (for making tea). Her principle dimensions are 49.97 ft (15.23 m) long with a 9.31 ft (2.84 m) beam. She is displayed ashore in the museum building.
- Steam launch Dolly was built in 1850 and has her original engine. She is a rare example of an early steam launch and has been listed (in Guinness Book of Records) as the oldest mechanically propelled boat in the world with their original machinery. (Note: Although see Bertha, a chain-hauled dredger of 1844.) She has a carvel-built wooden hull; her builder is unknown. She sank at her moorings in 1895 and was salvaged in 1960. She may have been the first screw-propelled vessel to operate on Windermere (earlier ones using paddle wheels). She is 40.98 ft (12.49 m) long with 6.49 ft (1.98 m) beam. She is currently ashore in the museum building.
- Steam launch Esperance was built of wrought iron in 1869 in Scotland and, in 1870, moved to Windermere by train from Barrow-in-Furness. Her build was of a high standard: the rivets were countersunk into the hull plates to give a smooth finish. When built, she was fitted with twin steam engines. Her first owner was Henry Schneider, and he used her on the first leg of the commute from his home at Belsfield House to his business in Barrow-in-Furness, via the railway station at Lakeside. She was converted to a houseboat in the 1920s and became the inspiration of Captain Flint's houseboat in Swallows and Amazons. Esperance is 64.95 ft (19.80 m) long with a 10 ft (3.0 m) beam.
- The steam barge Raven was built in 1871 in Scotland for the Furness Railway Company to deliver goods along the length of the lake. She has an iron hull. Her single cylinder steam engine is the original. Her dimensions are 70.95 ft (21.63 m) length and 14.59 ft (4.45 m) beam.

== Buildings ==
The new buildings were designed by architects Carmody Groarke, working with engineers Arup. A major architectural feature is the oxidised copper used for the external surfaces of the buildings.

=== Stirling Prize shortlisting ===
In 2021, the Windermere Jetty Museum was among six buildings shortlisted for the Stirling Prize. It won the RIBA North West Award 2021, the RIBA North West Building of the Year Award 2021, and the RIBA North West Client of the Year Award 2021.
