= Dovecot Studios =

Studio and gallery in Edinburgh, Scotland

Coordinates: 55°55′6″N 3°14′13″W

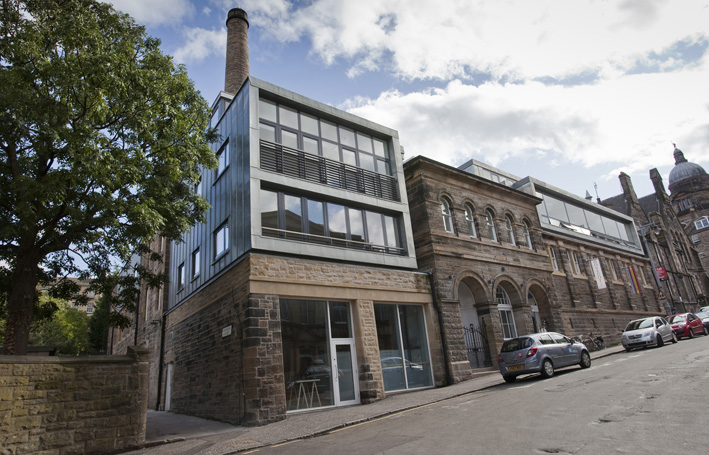
Exterior of Dovecot Studios, Infirmary Street

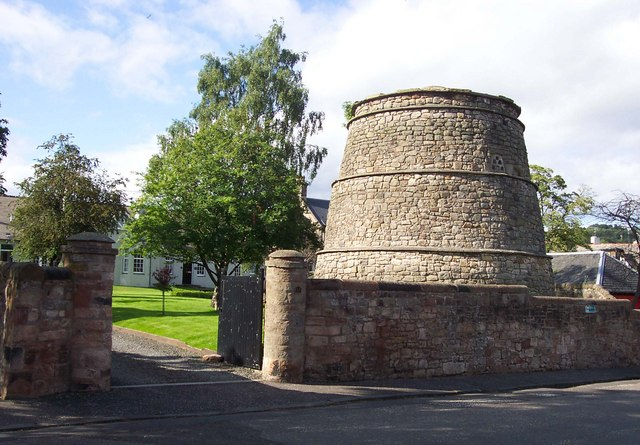
Corstorphine Dovecot

Dovecot Studios or Dovecot is a tapestry studio and arts venue in Edinburgh, Scotland.

Dovecot Studios was established by the 4th Marquess of Bute in 1912, recruiting weavers from William Morris' workshops at Merton Abbey in London. The Marquess commissioned the studios to produce large tapestries for Mount Stuart House, his home on the Isle of Bute. Dovecot Studios' first home was in Corstorphine, which at the time was a village on the west side of Edinburgh. It was originally housed in a purpose built studio next to a sixteenth-century dovecot, the only remaining part of the medieval Corstorphine Castle.

After the Second World War, the studios became known as Edinburgh Tapestry Company. They focused on working with the most famous contemporary British artists, with individuals including Henry Moore and Graham Sutherland providing designs for tapestries. In 2001 it lost its financial support and went into liquidation. However the company was purchased and renewed by a new board of directors the same year, but could not remain at the Corstorphine site.

Since 2008 Dovecot Studios has been residing in the refurbished Infirmary Street Baths in central Edinburgh, which gives a new life and purpose to what was a derelict building.

As well as housing the Studio's Tapestry Studio, Dovecot's Infirmary Street home now also includes a cafe, shop, event hire spaces and three exhibition galleries. These spaces have shown a number Dovecot-curated and touring exhibitions, including "Weaving The Century: Tapestry from Dovecot Studios 1912–2012", "Jerwood Makers Open" and exhibitions by artists as diverse as Ptolemy Mann, Wendy Ramshaw and Michael Brennand Wood.

During the 2012 Edinburgh Fringe, musical performance "A Tapestry Of Many Threads" written by Alexander McCall Smith and Tom Cunningham received its world premiere on the weaving floor at Dovecot to critical acclaim. The performance celebrated a decade of Dovecot weaving and included performers from the Royal Conservatoire of Scotland. "A Tapestry Of Many Threads" won a 2012 Herald Angel Award.

== Artists who have worked with Dovecot Studios ==
The following notable artists have worked with Dovecot Studios:

- Edward Bawden
- Henry Moore
- Graham Sutherland
- Edward Wadsworth
- David Hockney
- Sir Peter Blake
- Peter Saville
- John Byrne (playwright)
- Alasdair Gray
- Chis Ofili
- Gary Fabian Miller
- Elizabeth Blackadder
- Eduardo Paolozzi
- Alison Watt
- Julie Brooke
- Victoria Crowe
- Jankel Adler
- Bernat Klein
- Louise Nevelson
- Alan Davie
- Archie Brennan
