= Onchan Village Hall =

Coordinates: 54°10′28″N 4°27′15″W

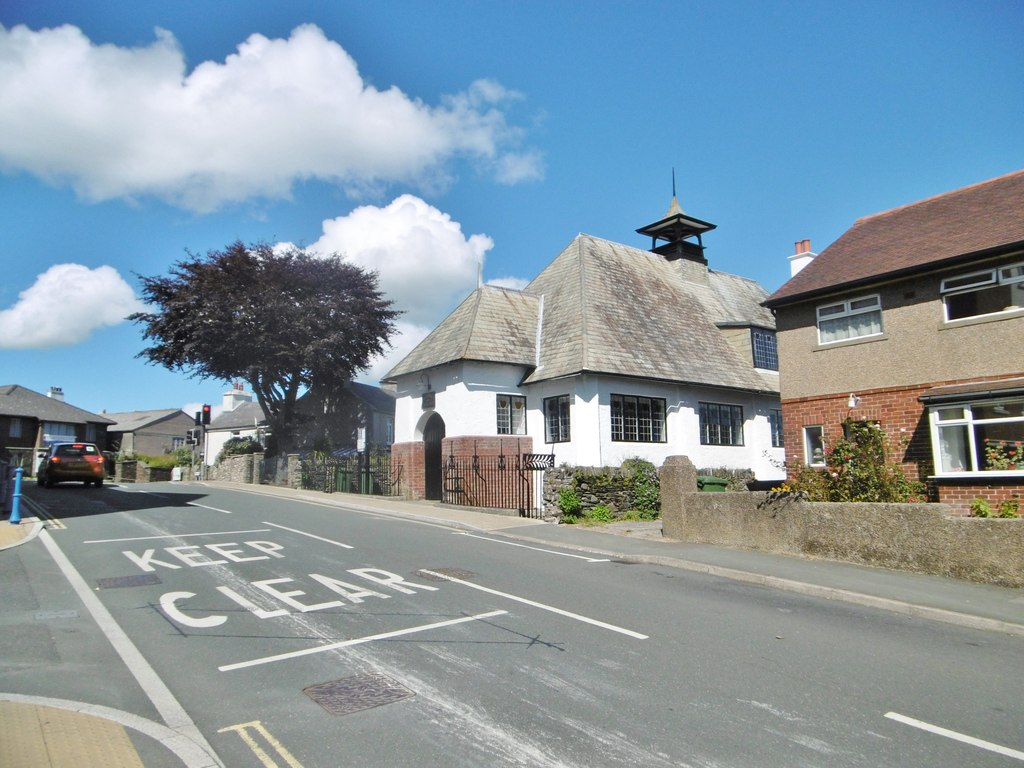
The building, in 2015

Onchan Village Hall is one of eleven buildings in the Isle of Man known to have been built by Baillie Scott. The Scottish architect and designer then resident on the Isle of Man had won the commission for the building through a design competition held by Onchan Commissioners for the proposed new hall. The building was constructed in 1897–98 and it is still in regular use today.
