= SS Raven (1871) =

Second-oldest ship on Lloyd's Register

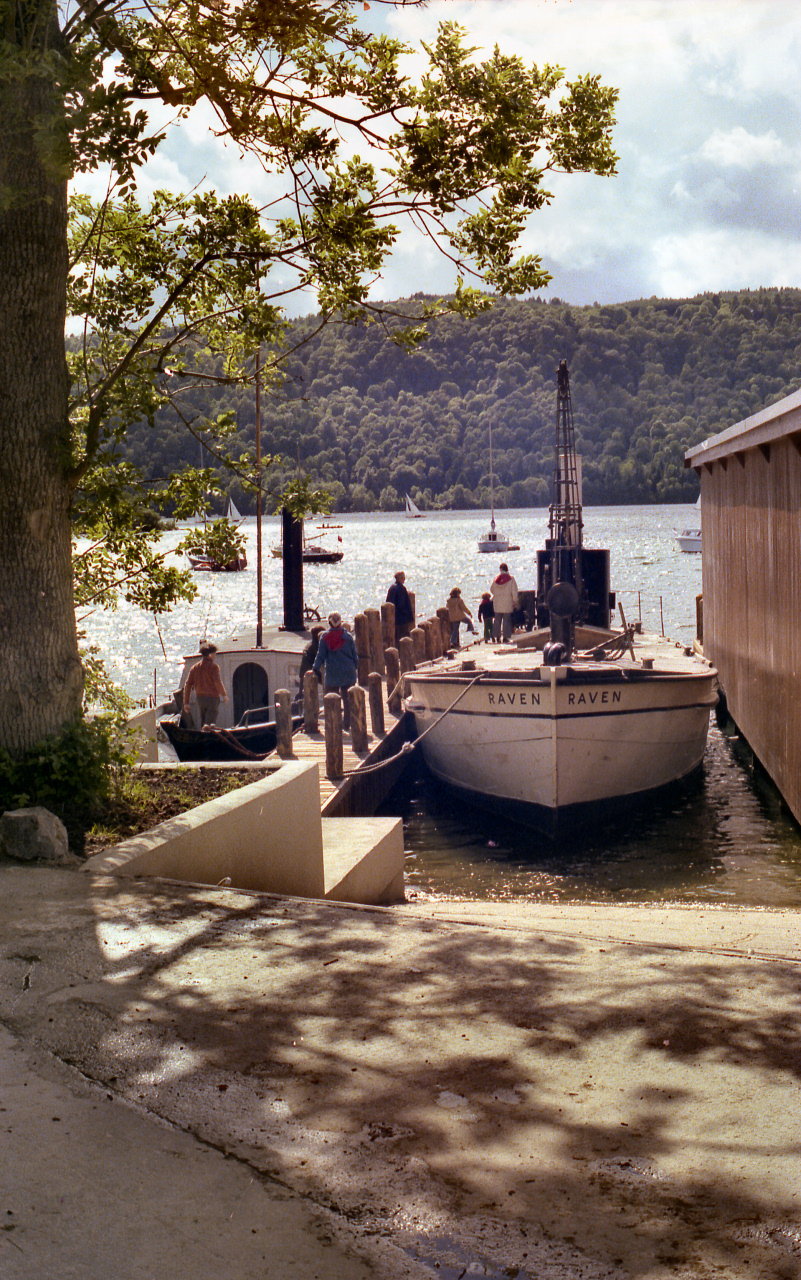
- The Raven at the Windermere Steamboat Museum in 1977

History

United Kingdom
- Name: Raven
- Owner: Windermere Jetty Museum
- Builder: T.B. Seath & Co
- Launched: 1871

General characteristics
- Type: Steam barge
- Tonnage: 41 (gross)
- Length: 70.95 ft (21.63 m)
- Beam: 14.59 ft (4.45 m)
- Draught: 4 ft (1.2 m)
- Propulsion: Steam

SS Raven, sometimes also referred to as the SY Raven, is a steam barge ordered by the Furness Railway for use on the lake of Windermere in the English Lake District, where she has spent her entire working life. She is a member of the National Historic Fleet, and is now preserved. She is the second-oldest ship on Lloyd's Register and the oldest with her original machinery.

The Raven was built in 1871, and was originally used to carry cargo from the Furness Railway terminus at Lakeside station to houses, hotels and businesses around the lake, and to the railway warehouses at Ambleside and Bowness-on-Windermere. She also served as an ice-breaker for the passenger steamers run by the railway on the lake. In 1922 Raven was withdrawn from service and sold to Vickers Armstrong of Barrow-in-Furness for testing mine-laying equipment on the lake.

By the 1950s the Raven was lying abandoned at Lakeside. She was bought for preservation in 1956 by George Pattinson, the founder of the Windermere Steamboat Museum. Her engine and boiler were refurbished in time for her 100th birthday, when she once again steamed down the lake. The Raven was displayed at the Windermere Steamboat Museum from 1977 until the museum closed in 2006. The site and exhibits of the former museum are intended to reopen as the Windermere Jetty Museum of Boats, Steam and Stories, and in the meantime the Raven is in storage.

The Raven has a length of 70.95 feet (21.63 m), a beam of 14.59 feet (4.45 m), a draught of 4 feet (1.2 m) and a gross tonnage of 41. Her hull is of rivetted iron and she retains her original single cylinder steam engine. The present boiler was installed in about 1926.
