= Abbot Hall Art Gallery =

Grade I listed art museum in Kendal, United Kingdom

Coordinates: 54°19′23″N 2°44′38″W

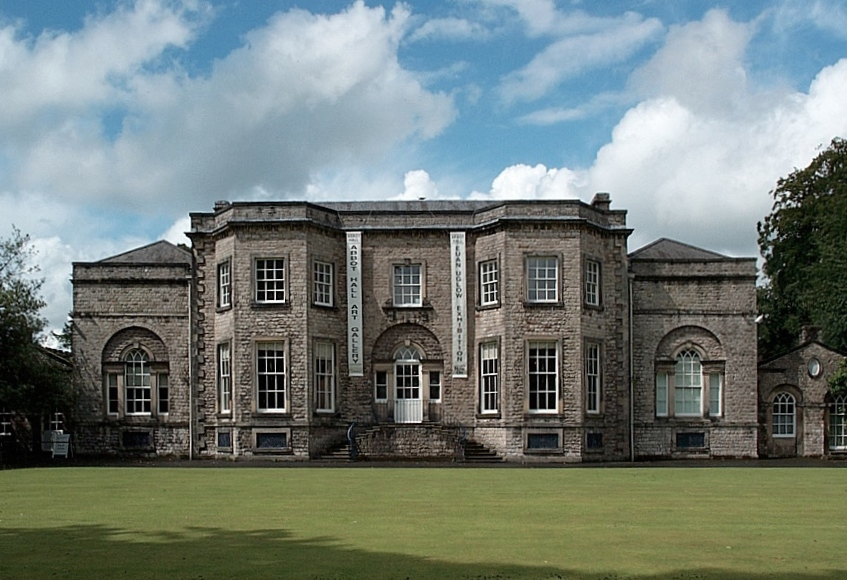
The gallery is a Grade I listed building

Abbot Hall Art Gallery is an art gallery in Kendal, England. Abbot Hall was built in 1759 by Colonel George Wilson, the second son of Daniel Wilson of Dallam Tower, a large house and country estate nearby. It was built on the site of the old Abbot's Hall, roughly where the museum is today. Before the Dissolution of the Monasteries this was where the Abbot or his representative would stay when visiting from the mother house of St Mary's Abbey, York. The architect is unknown. During the early twentieth century the Grade I listed building was dilapidated and has been restored as an art gallery.

As of January 2021 Abbot Hall was closed to the public while Lakeland Arts carried out a redevelopment of the building and grounds. The reopening was on 20 May 2023 with an exhibition by Julie Brook.

== Building ==
Originally a town house, Abbot Hall was converted into an art gallery in 1957–62. The building is in stone on a plinth, with quoins, a belt course, a modillioned eaves cornice, and a parapet. The central block has two storeys with cellars, and there is a symmetrical east front of seven bays. Curved steps lead up to a central round-headed doorway in an architrave with moulded imposts, a projecting keystone, and an interlaced fanlight. This is flanked by two-storey canted bay windows, and outside these are recessed bays in one storey containing Venetian windows. The outermost two bays on each side are gabled, lower and further recessed, and have one storey. They contain two round-headed sash windows with an oval window in a pediment above.

== Collection ==
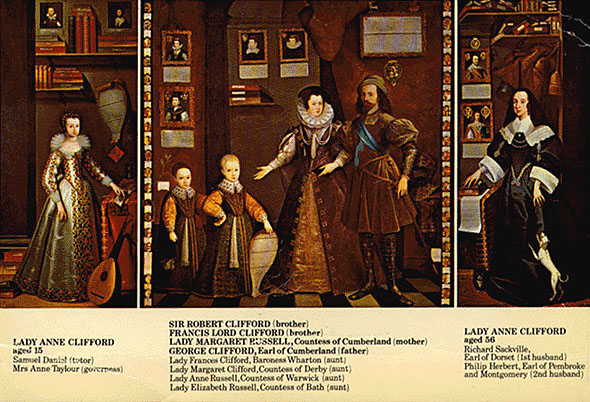
Lady Anne Clifford and her family in The Great Picture attributed to Jan van Belcamp

It has one of the most important collections of George Romney’s paintings in Britain and several of his sketchbooks and drawings. Paintings from the eighteenth century include a pair of views of Windermere by Philip James de Loutherbourg. There is also an important group of work by another local artist, Daniel Gardner. It has a significant collection of watercolours, mainly from the second half of the eighteenth and the first half of the nineteenth centuries. Many of the greatest watercolourists of the period are represented, including John Robert Cozens, David Cox, Peter De Wint, John Sell Cotman, John Varley and Edward Lear as well as J. M. W. Turner's watercolours The Passage of Mount St. Gotthard and Windermere (1821).

In 2011 a triptych of Lady Anne Clifford, entitled The Great Picture (currently (2011) in the ownership of the Lakeland Arts Trust) went on display.

The Victorian art critic and social commentator, John Ruskin, lived in the Lake District and the gallery has one of the most comprehensive collections of his drawings and watercolours. The modern collection concentrates more on painting but has sculptures by Barbara Hepworth, Jean Arp, and Elisabeth Frink. There are also works by Ben Nicholson, Kurt Schwitters, Bryan Wynter, Sean Scully, David Hockney, LS Lowry, Graham Sutherland, Victor Pasmore, David Bomberg, Hilde Goldschmidt and many others.

The gallery also has a display about English writer Arthur Ransome. His desk, typewriter and other memorabilia are exhibited. The gallery is also the official address of The Arthur Ransome Society.

== Exhibitions ==
2019

- Ruskin, Turner & the Storm Cloud, this also featured work by Emma Stibbon retracing the steps of Ruskin and Turner.
- Refuge: The Art of Belonging
- Coming Home: Lady Anne Clifford

2018

- Julie Cope's Grand Tour: The Story of a Life by Grayson Perry
- Alison Watt: A Shadow on the Blind

2013

- Picasso’s Tête de Femme
- Exultant Strangeness: Graham Sutherland Landscapes
- Bethan Huws & The Bistritsa Babi: Singing for the Sea (1993)
- Lynn Chadwick: Evolution in Sculpture
- Uwe Wittwer: In The Middle Distance

2012

- Hughie O'Donoghue: Vivid Field
- Francis Bacon to Paula Rego
- Abbot Hall at Fifty
- Turner and his Contemporaries: The Hickman Bacon Watercolour Collection

2011

- ARTIST ROOMS: Richard Long
- Kitaj: Portraits and Reflections
- Sheila Fell
- Drawn from Life

2010

- Thomas Bewick: Tale-pieces
- The Barber Goes North: Treasures from The Barber Institute of Fine Arts,
- University of Birmingham
- The Loneliness of Lowry
- Mark Francis: Arena
- Basil Beattie: Paintings from the Janus series II 2010

2009

- Andrzej Jackowski: The Remembered Present
- David Nash: Drawings and Sculpture
- Garry Fabian Miller: Time Passage
- Robert Bevan and the Cumberland Market Group

2008

- Prunella Clough
- Frank Auerbach Etchings and Drypoints 1954 - 2006
- Ben Nicholson
- Craigie Aitchison Prints

2007

- Maggi Hambling, No Straight Lines: Waves and Waterfalls
- Collecting the Past, Present & Future

2006

- David Bomberg
- Morandi's Legacy: Influences on British Art
- Drawing Inspiration: Contemporary British Drawing
- The Oliver Thompson Collection of British Watercolours

2005

- Pictures of Innocence
- Nicola Hicks: Sculpture, Drawing and Light
- Wyndham Lewis: The Bone Beneath the Pulp
- Sean Scully: Paintings and Works on Paper
- Freud, Auerbach, Hockney & Rego: Drawing on Copper and Stone

2004

- Walter Richard Sickert
- Paula Rego & Graham Sutherland: Prints
- Celia Paul: Stillness
- John Duncan Fergusson: Living Paint

2003

- Euan Uglow
- Tony Bevan: Works from Deptford
- Bruce Bernard: Artists and their Studios

2002

- Stanley Spencer
- RB Kitaj
- Bridget Riley
- Fabric - Reinterpreting the House

2001

- Paula Rego
- Andy Goldsworthy
- Li Yuan-chia
- Sculpture from the Tate
- Hughie O'Donoghue

2000

- Ruskin & the Light of Nature
- Paula Rego
- Goya - Etchings
- Edward Weston - photography
- The Art of the Feltmaker
- CHORA
- Edgar Holloway & Friends
- Royal Society of Painter-Printmakers
- Matisse: Jazz
- Conrad Atkinson
- Pottery by William Plumptre

1999

- Callum Innes
- Queen Victoria's Travels and Family
- Henry Moore - 'Sheep'
- Ruskin Pottery
- The St Ives School
- Watercolours from the Permanent Collection

1998

- Bridget Riley

1997

- Sublime Inspiration

1996

- Lucian Freud
- The Cornish Torbock Bequest of Lake District Watercolours
- James Hugonin
- John Ruskin: Paintings & Etchings
- Mary Newcomb

== See also ==
- Grade I listed buildings in Cumbria
- Listed buildings in Kendal
