= Archie Brennan (weaver) =

Scottish tapestry weaver (1931–2019)

Archie Brennan (1931–2019) was a noted Scottish tapestry weaver. He served his apprenticeship at the Edinburgh Tapestry Co (later to become the Dovecot Studios) and studied at Edinburgh College of Art. He went on to work at the College establishing their department of Tapestry and Fibre Arts. He also served Dovecot as their artistic director.

== Biography ==
Archie Brennan was born in Roslin, Edinburgh in 1931. Following apprenticeship training at the then Edinburgh Tapestry Company (now Dovecot Studios) between 1947 and 1953, Brennan went on to study in France, Carlisle College of Art, and Edinburgh College of Art respectively, from 1954 to 1952.

From 1962 to 1978, Brennan held the role of Artistic Director at Dovecot Studios. Through this period, the Studios worked collaboratively with several avant-garde artists including Eduardo Paolozzi.

Subsequently, Brennan went on to create a tapestry Department at Edinburgh College of Art and took on several lecturing and chairperson roles internationally. Brennan relocated to Canberra, Australia in 1975, where he took up the Creative Arts Fellowship at the Australian National University, and also provided advice on the founding of the Victorian Tapestry Workshop (Melbourne).

Brennan later moved to Papua New Guinea to work with the new National Arts School. In 1984, Brennan relocated to Hawaii, to work his own creative process, and from 1993 resided in New York, continuing his weaving practice, as well as travelling and providing instruction and education on the art of tapestry weaving.

Exhibiting globally throughout his life, Brennan finally ceased tapestry weaving in 2017, after some 70 years creating using this technique.

Following his death in 2019, Brennan has been recognised through exhibition and inspiration. In 2020 the Dovecot Gallery raised over £25,000 by a public appeal, to support a major retrospective exhibition of 80 of Brennan's tapestries, which was displayed March–June 2021. Dovecot's weavers used Brennan's works as inspiration to create their own interpretations as part of the exhibition.

== Works and inspirations ==
Founded in traditional techniques of tapestry weaving, Brennan's practice was reflective as well as a forward looking and progressive. The Victoria & Albert Museum cites Brennan as being “credited with bringing about a renaissance in tapestry weaving and design in Britain.”, and in 2019 he was described as "possibly the greatest Scottish Pop artist you have never heard of". Informed by a range of subjects, Brennan’s tapestry compositions dealt with a variety of subjects and themes, often depicting textiles and people within his work.

The global perspective of Brennan’s approach is reflected in his 1974 work, Package, created in submission for the British Crafts Centre exhibition. As indicated by the title of this piece, Package was three-dimensional, and was the first of numerous pieces which Brennan created in the shape of packages and postcards which were mailed globally. Brennan's 1977 work Chains, inspired by the mooring chains of ships at Leith docks and measuring 158 by 115 centimetres (62 in × 45 in), is held in the National Museum of Scotland.

Designed by Brennan in 1972 and woven under the direction of Fiona Mathison at Dovecot Studios in 1978, At a Window I, Spotted Dress, Second Version, 1980 is held by the Victorian & Albert Museum, London. Featuring a figure wearing a spotted dress in the foreground, and a curtain and tapestry in the background, this work illustrates Brennan's interest in depicting textiles and repeating patterns through the medium of tapestry.

== Awards ==
- Saltire Society Award, awarded 1972
- First Major Art Award, The Scottish Arts Council, awarded 1974
- Society of Arts and Letters Switzerland, awarded 1977
- The Polish Artists’ Union Prize, Silver Medal, Triennale of Tapestry, Lodz, awarded 1978
- London Lord Mayor’s Annual Award to Artists, awarded 1978
- O.B.E. Presented by H.M. Queen Elizabeth II for Services to the Arts, awarded 1981

== Professional service ==
- Acting Chairman of the British Crafts Centre
- President of the Society of Scottish Artists (1977/8)

== Selected publications ==
- Brennan, Archie. (1978). Archie Brennan: tapestries & rugs. Oxford: Oxford Gallery.
- Brennan, Archie and the Scottish Arts Council. (1971). Archie Brennan: tapestry. Edinburgh: Scottish Arts Council.
- Brennan, A., Maffei, S. M., Stone, S., D'Allessandro, M., Lane, M., & New Jersey Center for Visual Arts. (2003). Contemporary tapestry: Archie Brennan, Susan Martin Maffei : November 9, 2003 – January 4, 2004.
