= Wordsworth Trust =

Independent charity in the United Kingdom

The Wordsworth Trust
- Formation: 1890-12-01
- Purpose: heritage tourism
- Location: Grasmere, Cumbria, England
- Website: www.wordsworth.org.uk

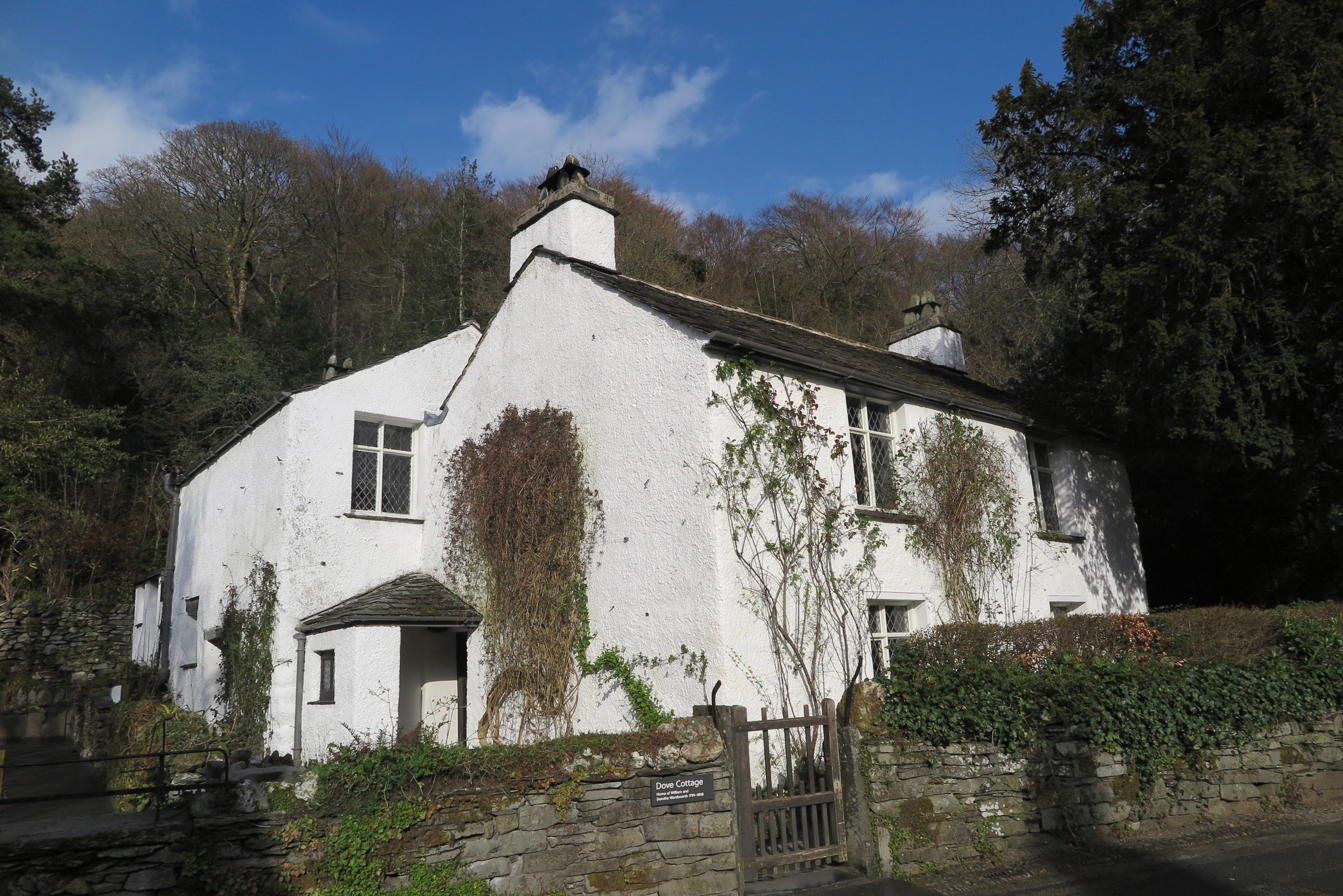
Dove Cottage

The Wordsworth Trust is an independent charity in the United Kingdom. It celebrates the life of the poet William Wordsworth, and looks after Dove Cottage in the Lake District village of Grasmere where Wordsworth and his sister Dorothy Wordsworth lived between 1799 and 1808. It also looks after the majority of the surrounding properties in the conservation area of Town End, and a collection of manuscripts, books and fine art relating to Wordsworth and other writers and artists of the Romantic period. In 2020 it introduced the brand name Wordsworth Grasmere.

The Wordsworth Trust's charitable purposes comprise preserving Dove Cottage and its environs, and advancing the public knowledge and enjoyment of the works of Wordsworth and the Romantic period.

The Wordsworth Trust is a member of the Cumbria Museum Consortium, along with Lakeland Arts and the Tullie House Museum and Art Gallery Trust. In 2012–2015 and 2015–2018 this consortium was one of the 21 museums or consortia (16 in the earlier period) to be funded by Arts Council England as "Major Partner Museums".

The Wordsworth Trust's first director was Dr Robert Woof CBE. Its current director is Michael McGregor. Its chairman is Professor Sir Jonathan Bate. Its president is Chris Smith.

== Origins ==
The Wordsworth Trust was founded (as the Dove Cottage Trust) in December 1891. Its creation followed a successful appeal for funds to purchase Dove Cottage, "for the eternal possession of those who love English poetry all over the world". Dove Cottage itself opened to visitors on 27 July 1891.

The appeal to purchase Dove Cottage was led by Stopford Brooke; the Wordsworth Trust's other founding trustees included Canon Hardwicke Rawnsley, Professor William Knight, The Rt Rev John Wordsworth and the Duke of Argyll. Their model was Shakespeare's birthplace in Stratford-upon-Avon, which had been purchased for the nation in 1847, but part of their motivation was also "the associations, personal, literary and moral, which gather around this cottage". As well as Dorothy Wordsworth, these associations included Thomas De Quincey (who himself had the tenancy of Dove Cottage between 1809 and 1835), Samuel Taylor Coleridge, Robert Southey, Sir Walter Scott, Sir Humphry Davy and Sir George Beaumont.

== Collection ==
The Wordsworth Trust’s collection contains over 90% of Wordsworth’s verse manuscripts, and the largest collection of working papers, letters and other manuscript material relating to Wordsworth and his family anywhere in the world. It includes each of the 23 surviving manuscript versions of The Prelude, and all of the surviving notebooks in which Dorothy Wordsworth recorded their life at Dove Cottage, now published as the Grasmere Journal.

The collection also includes Lake District drawings and other works by artists including David Cox, Joseph Farington, Joseph Wright of Derby, Thomas Girtin, Francis Towne, James Gillray and J.M.W. Turner.

The Wordsworth Trust began assembling a collection of manuscripts, books and other items for visiting students almost as soon as it was founded, but its collection significantly increased in size in 1935 when it received the Wordsworth family papers by bequest from Gordon Graham Wordsworth, Wordsworth’s last surviving grandson. In the same year it converted a neighbouring barn into a museum, so that some of this material could be displayed. The museum was officially opened by John Masefield. In 1981 this was replaced by the current Museum at Wordsworth Grasmere, which is in a converted coachhouse immediately to the north of Dove Cottage. The former barn now houses the Wordsworth Trust's administration.

In 2005 the collection was re-housed in the Jerwood Centre at the Wordsworth Trust, a purpose-built repository with research facilities adjacent to the Museum. The Jerwood Centre was funded by the Heritage Lottery Fund (since renamed the National Lottery Heritage Fund), the North West Regional Development Agency, the Jerwood Foundation and the European Regional Development Fund, and it was officially opened by Seamus Heaney on 2 June 2005.

== Activities ==
The Wordsworth Trust's activities include staging exhibitions in the Museum, providing workshops and courses for schools and colleges, providing activities in local communities, and presenting a programme of talks, poetry readings and other events.

The Wordsworth Trust also provides paid traineeships and internships, which provides experience of working in a museum / heritage environment and opportunities to gain some of the skills needed for a career in that field.

In April 2018, the National Lottery Heritage Fund announced a £4.1 million grant to improve the Museum and improve access for visitors to Dove Cottage. In March 2018, the UK Government announced that Cumbria Local Enterprise Partnership had secured funding to enhance visitor attractions in the Lake District including Dove Cottage and the Museum as part of the Northern Powerhouse project.

The reopening of Dove Cottage was postponed from 7 April 2020, the 250th anniversary of Wordsworth's birth, to 15 August 2020 because of the coronavirus pandemic. The whole site, including the refurbished Museum, opened using the new brand Wordsworth Grasmere on 18 May 2021.

In March 2026, the Wordsworth Trust announced that it had acquired Rydal Mount, where Wordsworth and his family lived from 1813, with funding from the Julia Rausing Trust and the Charlotte Aitken Trust.

== See also ==
- Arts Council England Major Partner Museums
