= Lakeland Arts =

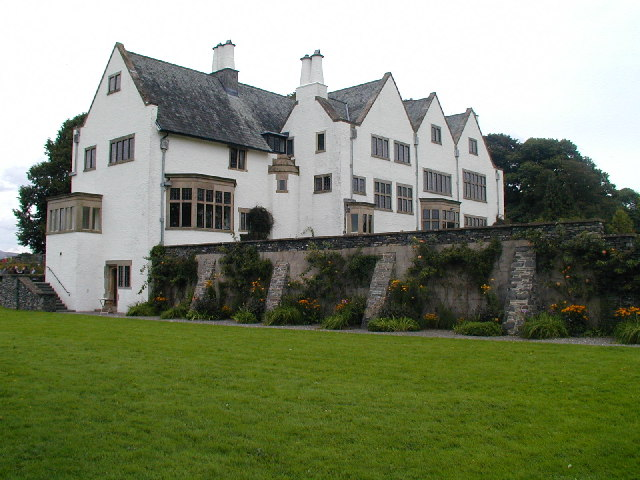
Blackwell, operated by Lakeland Arts

Lakeland Arts is an English charitable company, successor to the Lakeland Arts Trust (founded 1957), based in the Lake District. It operates Blackwell The Arts & Crafts House near Windermere, Abbot Hall Art Gallery and the Museum of Lakeland Life & Industry both in Kendal, and Windermere Jetty: Museum of Boats, Steam and Stories which re-opened in March 2019 (formerly Windermere Steamboat Museum, taken over by Lakeland Arts Trust when it closed in 2007).

Lakeland Arts was established in 2013 as a charitable company, taking over the assets and responsibilities of the former Lakeland Arts Trust. It is one of the three members of the Cumbria Museum Consortium, along with the Tullie House Museum and Art Gallery Trust in Carlisle and the Wordsworth Trust in Grasmere. In 2012-15 and 2015-18 this consortium was one of the 21 museums or consortia (16 in the earlier period) to be funded by Arts Council England as "Major Partner Museums".
