= Tullie House Museum and Art Gallery =

Museum in Carlisle, United Kingdom

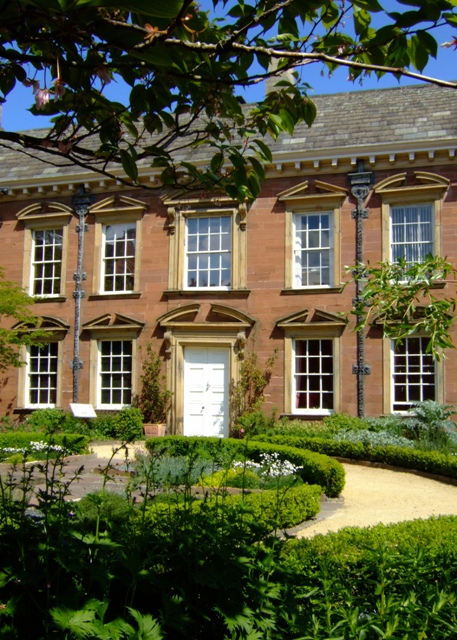
- Established: 1893; 133 years ago
- Location: Castle Street, Carlisle CA3 8TP, England, United Kingdom
- Coordinates: 54.8952°N 2.9405°W
- Visitors: 240,000 (2018)
- Chairman: Andrew Smith
- Director: Andrew Mackay
- Website: tullie.org.uk

Tullie House Museum and Art Gallery, officially known as Tullie since July 2024, is a museum in Carlisle, England. Opened by the Carlisle Corporation in 1893, the original building is a converted Jacobean mansion, with extensions added when it was converted. At first the building contained the museum and also a library, an art school and a technical school.

Tullie reopened on 26th April 2025 after extensive redevelopment.

The original building, including the extensions, is a Grade I listed building, and the wall, gates and railings in front of the house are separately Grade I listed.

The two schools were moved in the 1950s and the library in 1986. The museum expanded into the city Guildhall in 1980 and with new space available from 1986 it underwent an extensive redevelopment over 1989–90 and again in 2000–01.

Since May 2011 the museum has been an independent charitable trust, the Tullie House Museum and Art Gallery Trust. It is one of the three members of the Cumbria Museum Consortium, along with Lakeland Arts and the Wordsworth Trust. In 2012–15 and 2015–18 this consortium was one of the 21 museums or consortia (16 in the earlier period) to be funded by Arts Council England as "Major Partner Museums".

== Collections ==
The museum has large and eclectic collections of zoological, botanical and geological material. The plant collector, Clara Winsome Muirhead worked at the museum in the 1940s and donated a large collection of botanical specimens to the museum. The fine and decorative arts collections include works by Burne-Jones and other Pre-Raphaelite artists, as well as Stanley Spencer, Winifred Nicholson, Sheila Fell and Phil Morsman.

=== Musical instruments ===
There is collection of stringed instruments including a violin by Andrea Amati from the royal collection of France.

=== Roman Britain ===
There were two Roman forts in Carlisle, one of which, Uxelodunum (or Stanwix to use the modern placename), was the largest along the length of Hadrian's Wall. The museum houses important collections and temporary exhibitions associated with Hadrian's Wall.

=== Post-Roman history ===
The human history collection also features permanent exhibitions dedicated to the Vikings and the Border Reivers.

== Accolades ==
Tullie House Museum won the annual Family Friendly Museum Award (sponsored by the Telegraph Media Group) in 2015.

== Gallery ==
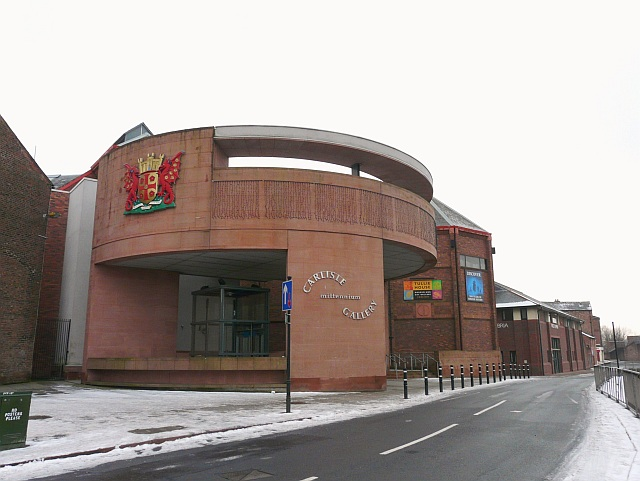
Rotunda, facing the castle

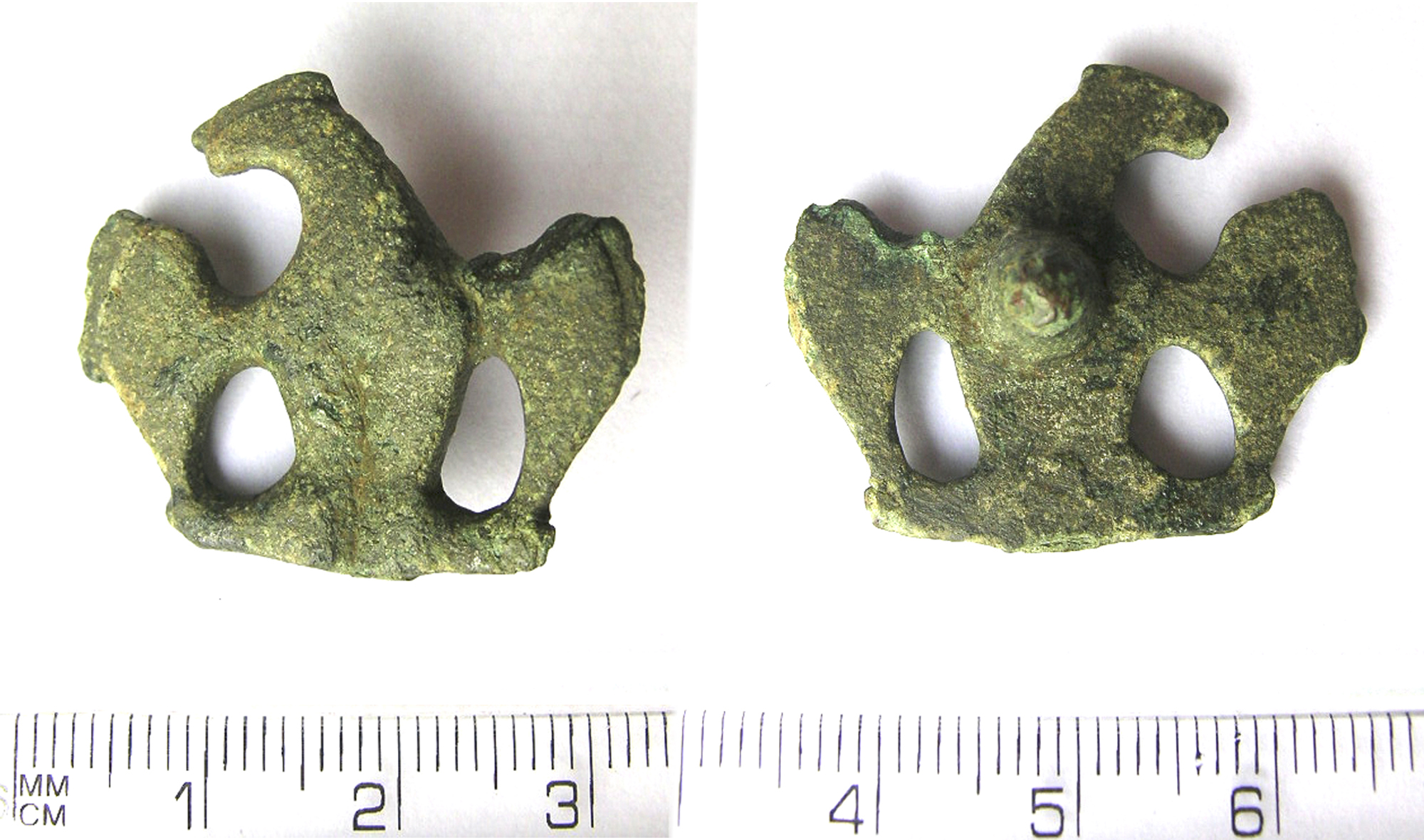
Centre piece of Roman Jupiter mount

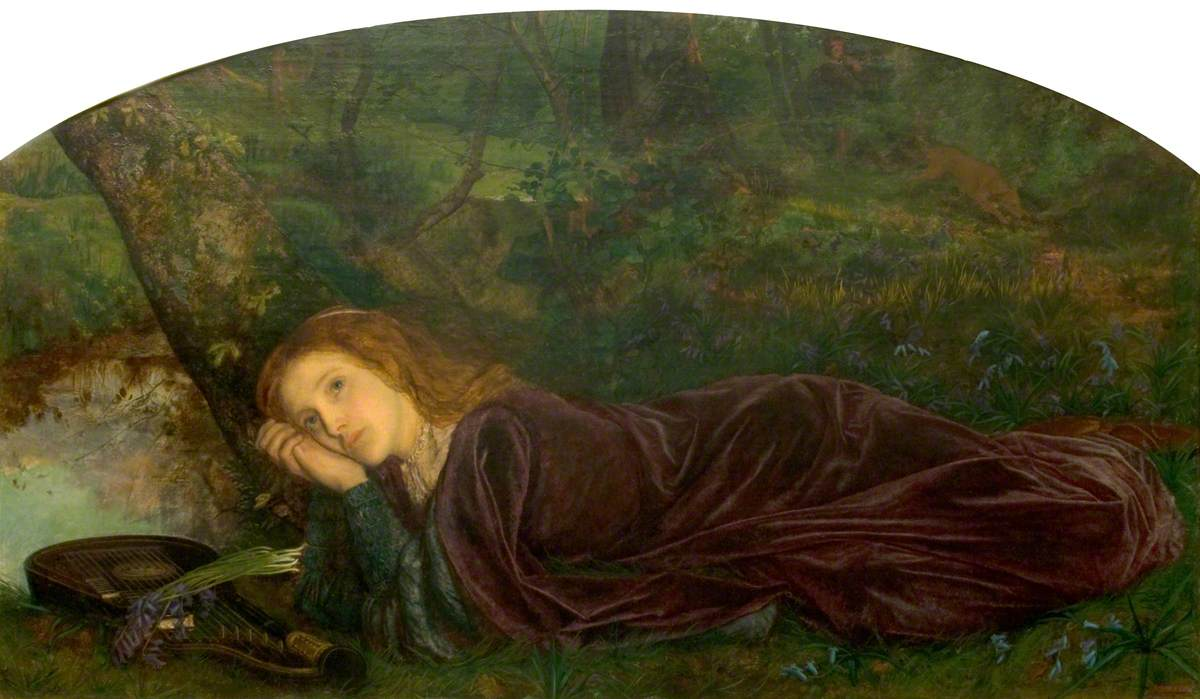
Arthur Hughes - The Rift within the Lute

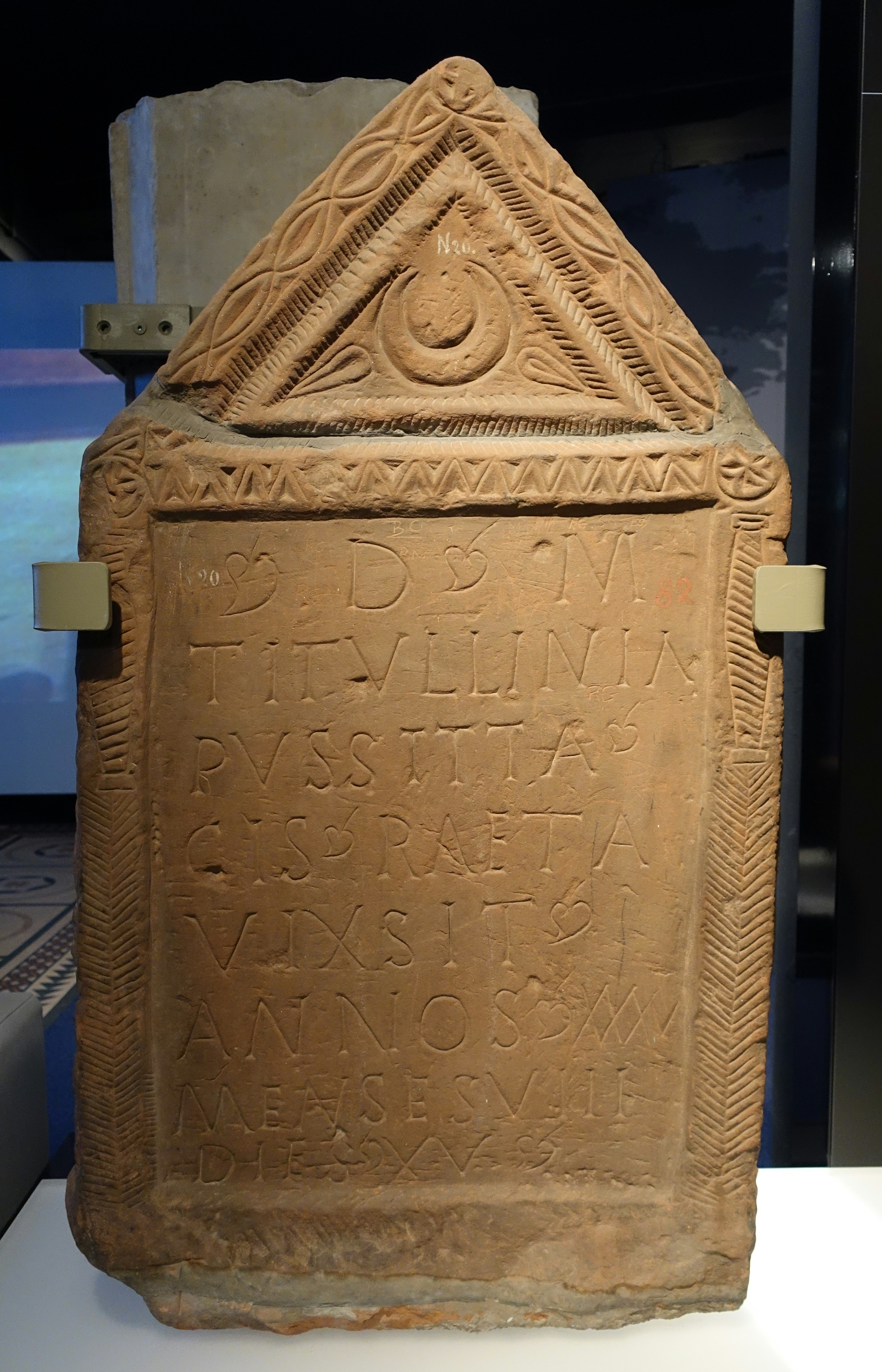
Roman gravestone

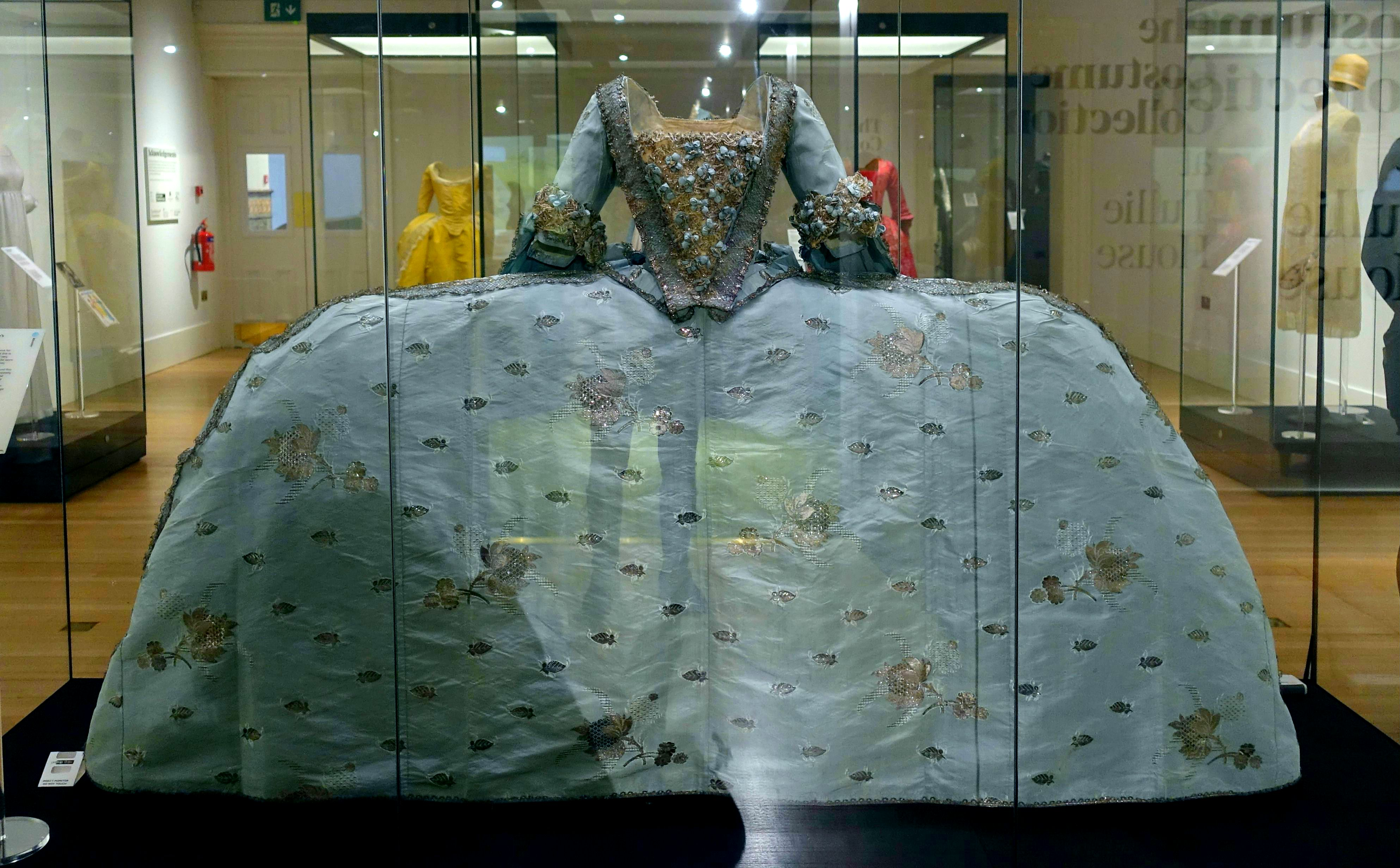
Margery Jackson's court mantua dress

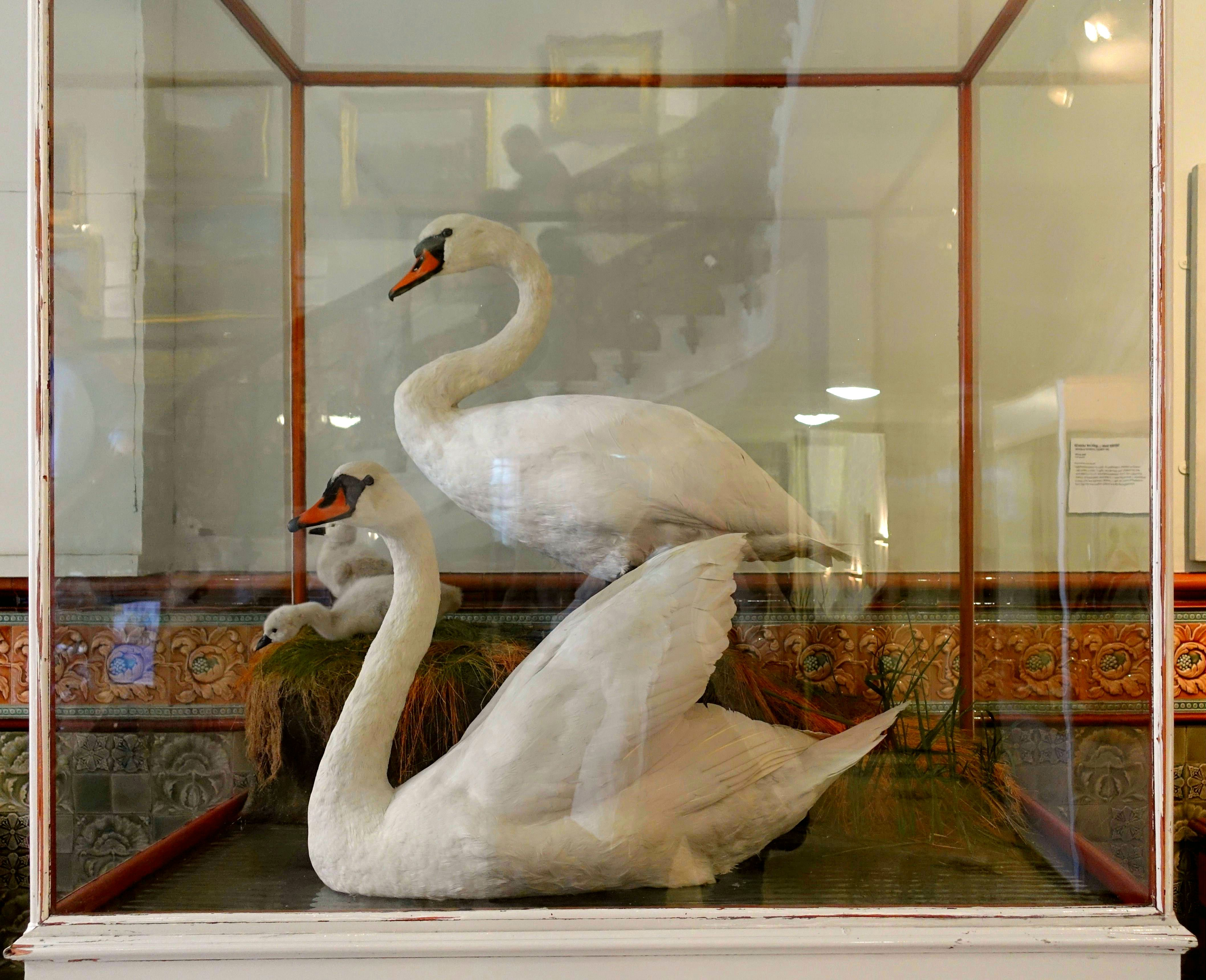
19th century Swans

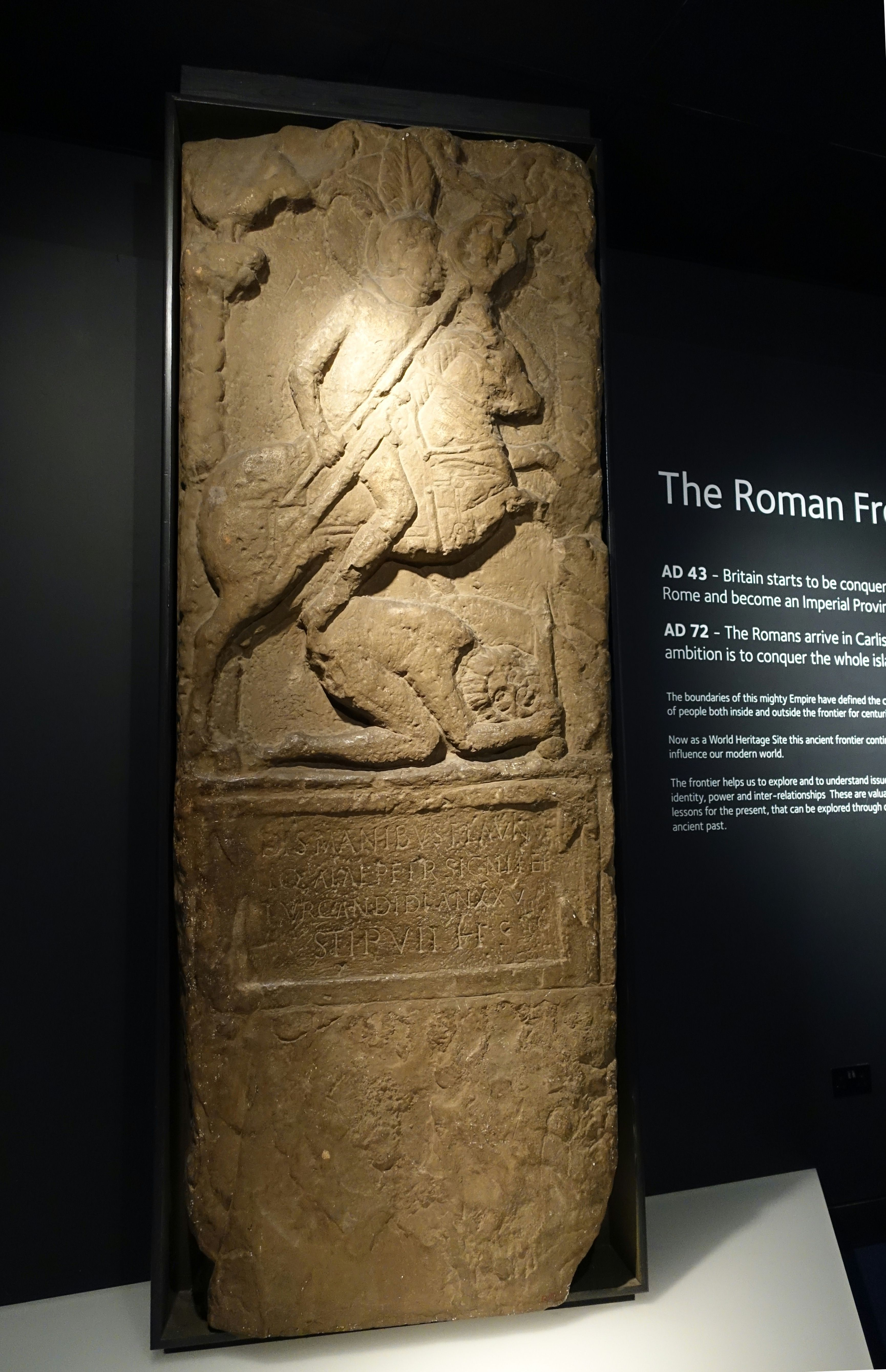
Ancient Roman tombstone

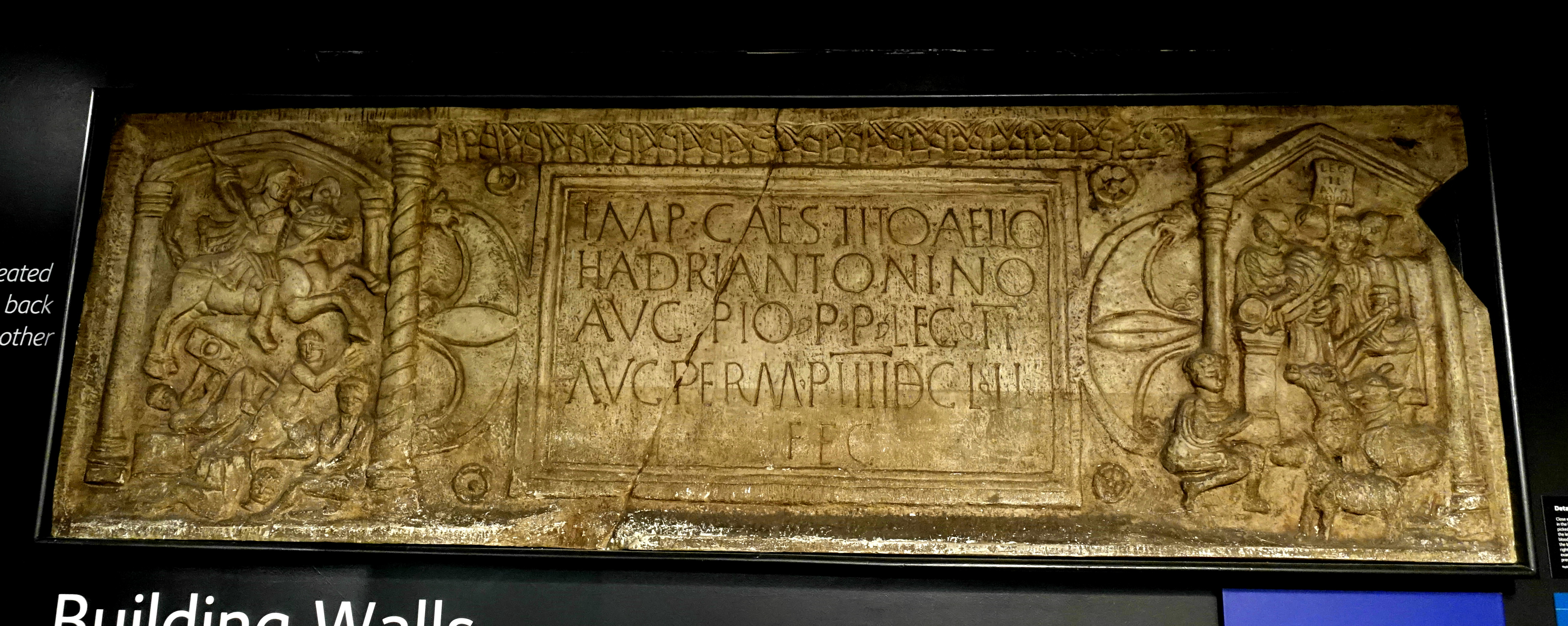
Ancient Roman plaque

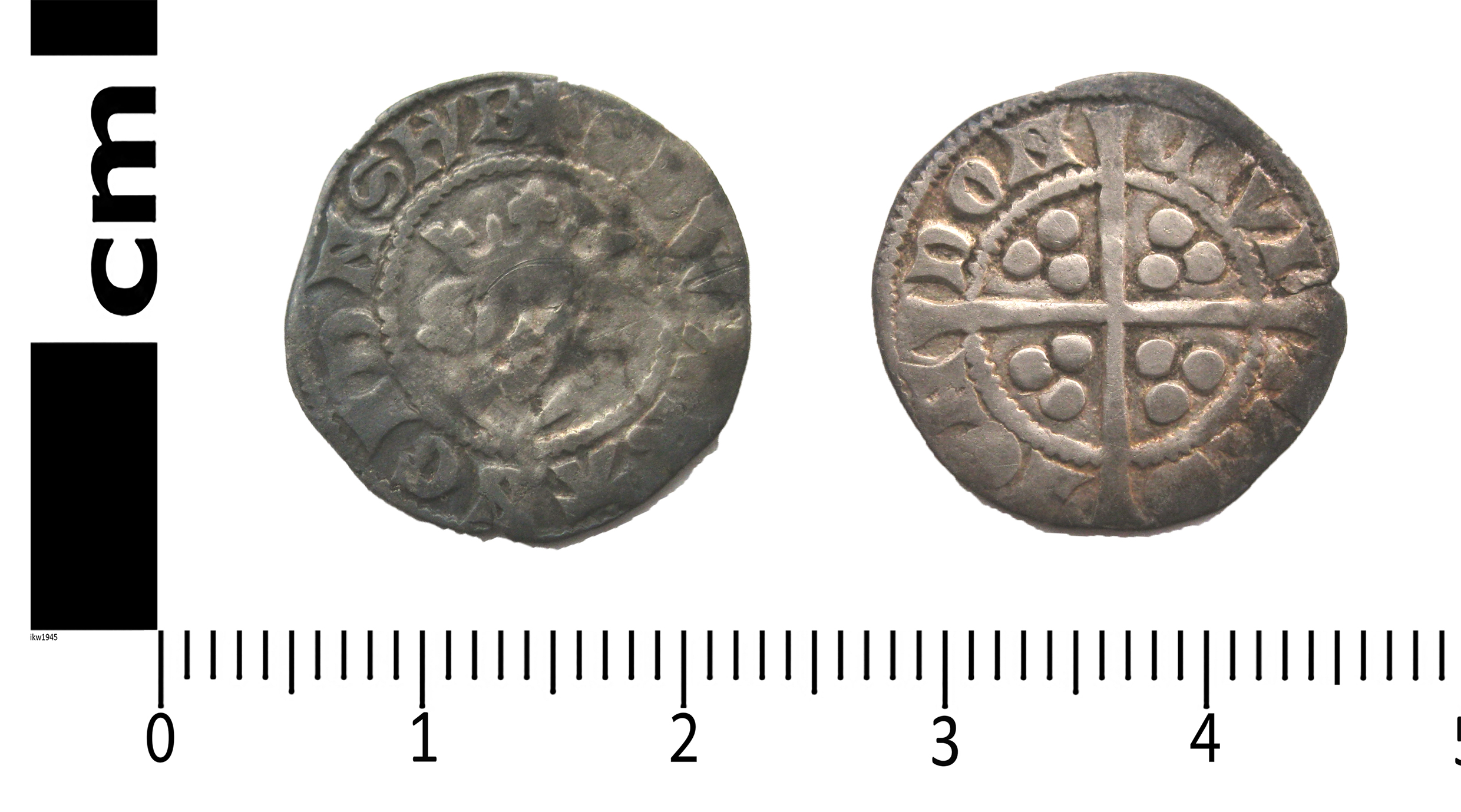
Medieval Rickerby Hoard Coin

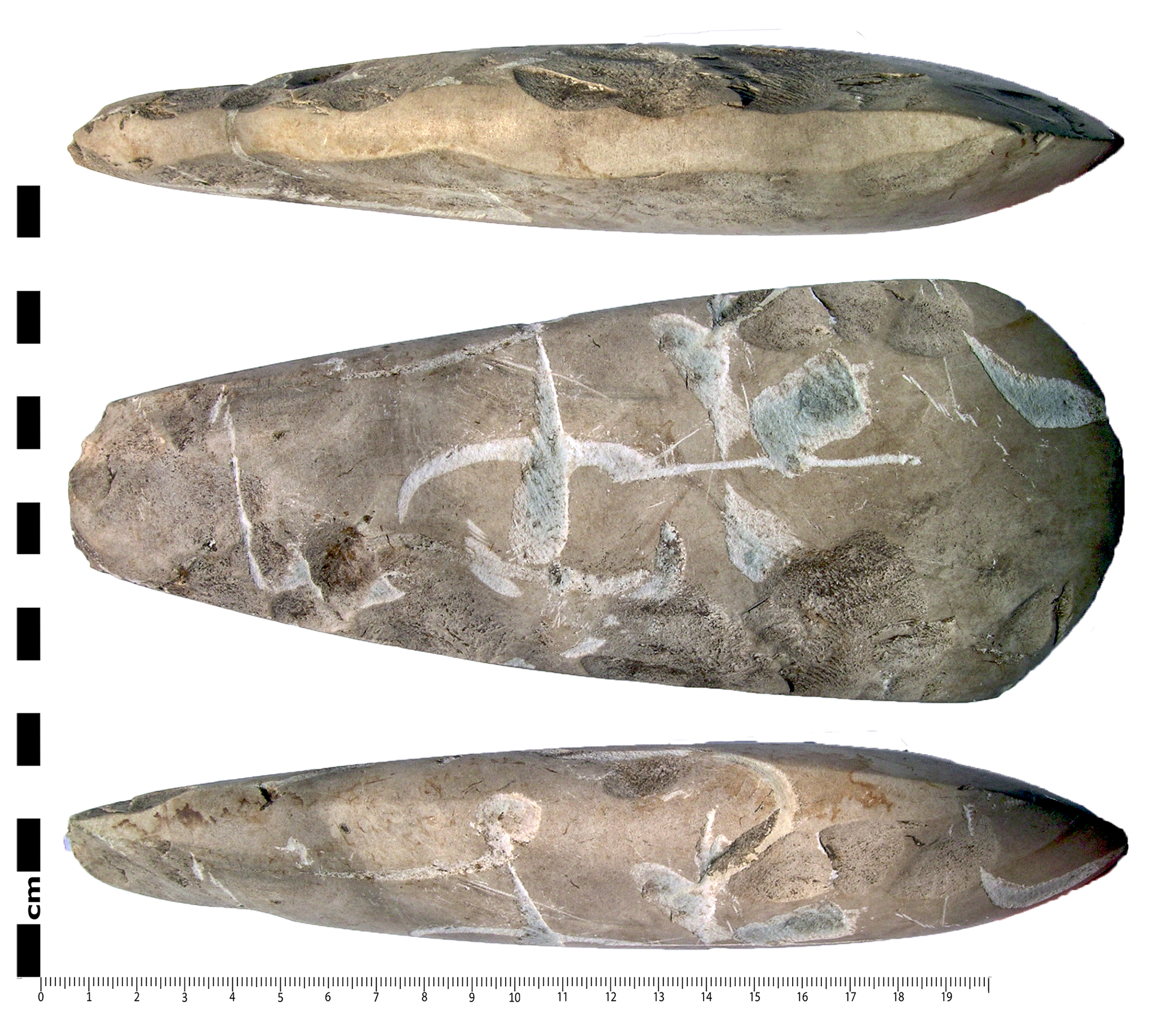
Langdale axe

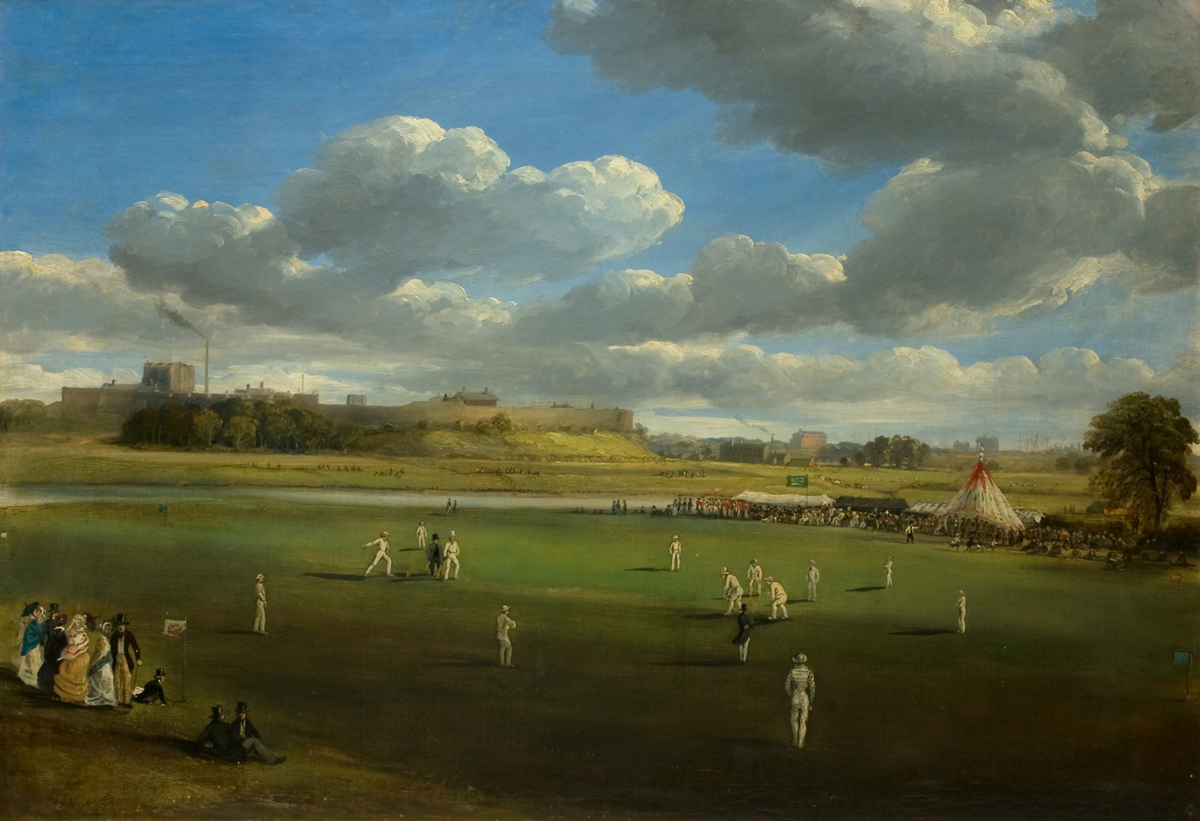
Cricket Match at Edenside

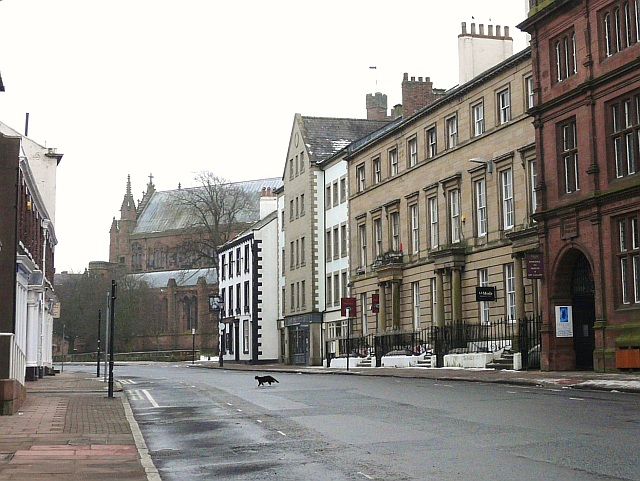
Side Entrance

== See also ==
- Grade I listed buildings in Cumbria
- Listed buildings in Carlisle, Cumbria
