= Baillie Scott =

British architect and artist

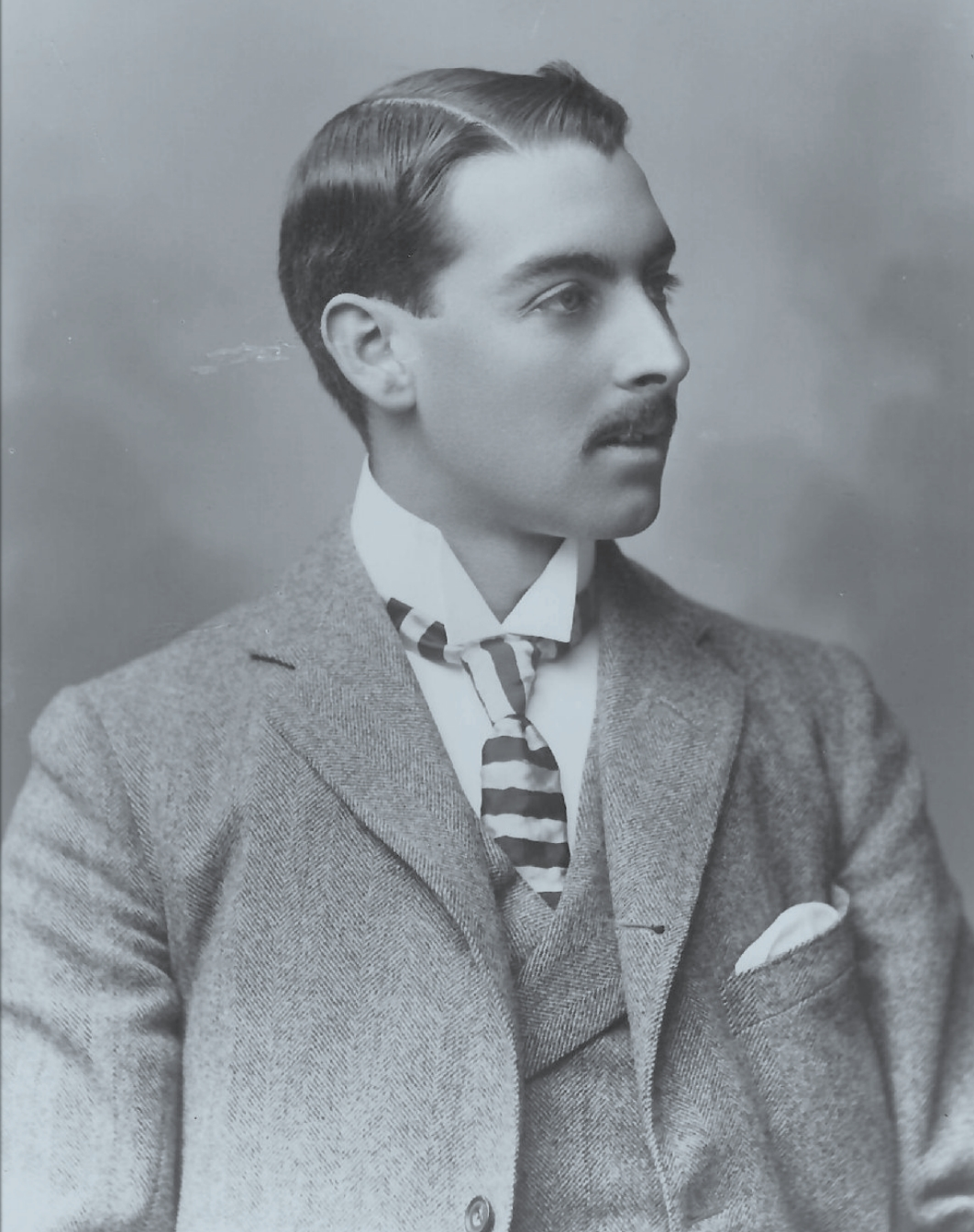
- Born: Mackay Hugh Baillie Scott; 23 October 1865; Beards Hill, St Peter's, Broadstairs, Kent, England
- Died: 10 February 1945 (aged 79); Elm Grove Hospital, Brighton, Sussex, England
- Occupation: Architect
- Known for: Blackwell house

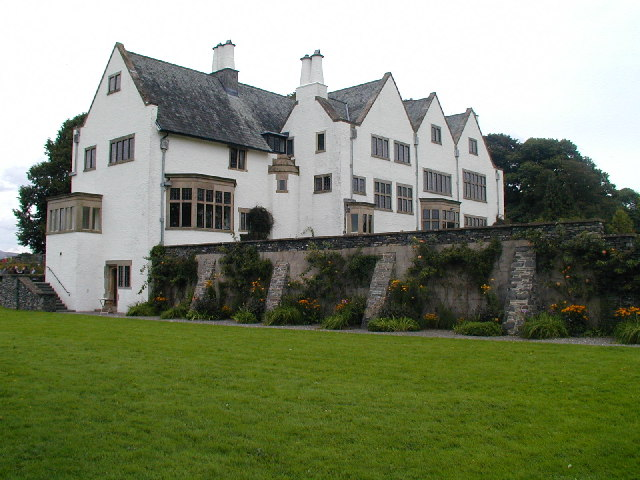
Blackwell, near Bowness, Cumbria

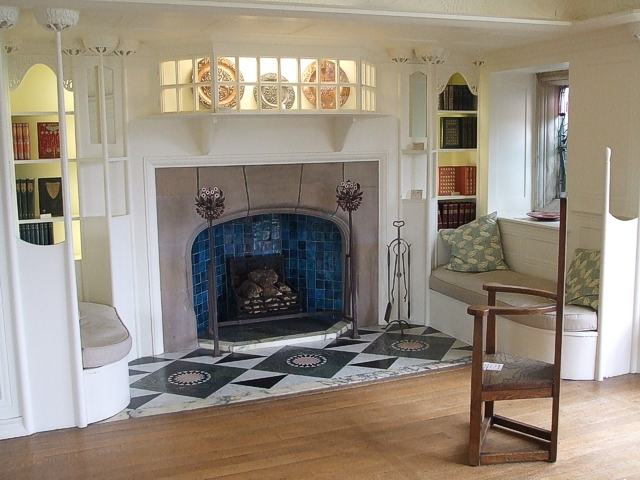
Fireplace at Blackwell, an example of Baillie Scott's attention to interior detail, typical of Arts & Crafts architects

Mackay Hugh Baillie Scott (23 October 1865 – 10 February 1945) was a British architect and artist. Through his long career, he designed in a variety of styles, including a style derived from the Tudor, an Arts and Crafts style reminiscent of Voysey and later the Neo-Georgian.

== Early life ==
The son of a wealthy Scottish landowner, Scott was born at Beards Hill, St Peter's near Broadstairs, Kent, the second of ten children. He originally studied at the Royal Agricultural College in Cirencester, but, having qualified in 1885, he decided to study architecture instead. He studied briefly in Bath, but his architectural development was especially marked by the 12 years he spent living in the Isle of Man. The first four years of this time he lived at Alexander Terrace, Douglas. In 1893, he and his family moved to Red House, Victoria Road, Douglas, which he had designed.

== Career ==
At the beginning of his career, Scott worked with Fred Saunders, with whom he had studied at the Isle of Man School of Art, which is also in Douglas. In May 1891, he was an art teacher. It was at the school of art that Scott and Archibald Knox became friends. He then left Saunders and set up his own business in 23 Athol Street, Douglas. In 1894, in an article in The Studio, he proposed a design having a high central hall with a galleried inglenook between the drawing and dining rooms and separated from them by folding screens. This hypothetical 'ideal house' brought in many commissions.

Scott developed his own Arts and Crafts style however, which progressed towards a simple form of architecture, relying on truth to material and function, and on precise craftsmanship.

Scott was known for the work he put into both the exterior and the interior, and its decoration. He produced nearly 300 buildings over the course of his career.

== Notable buildings ==
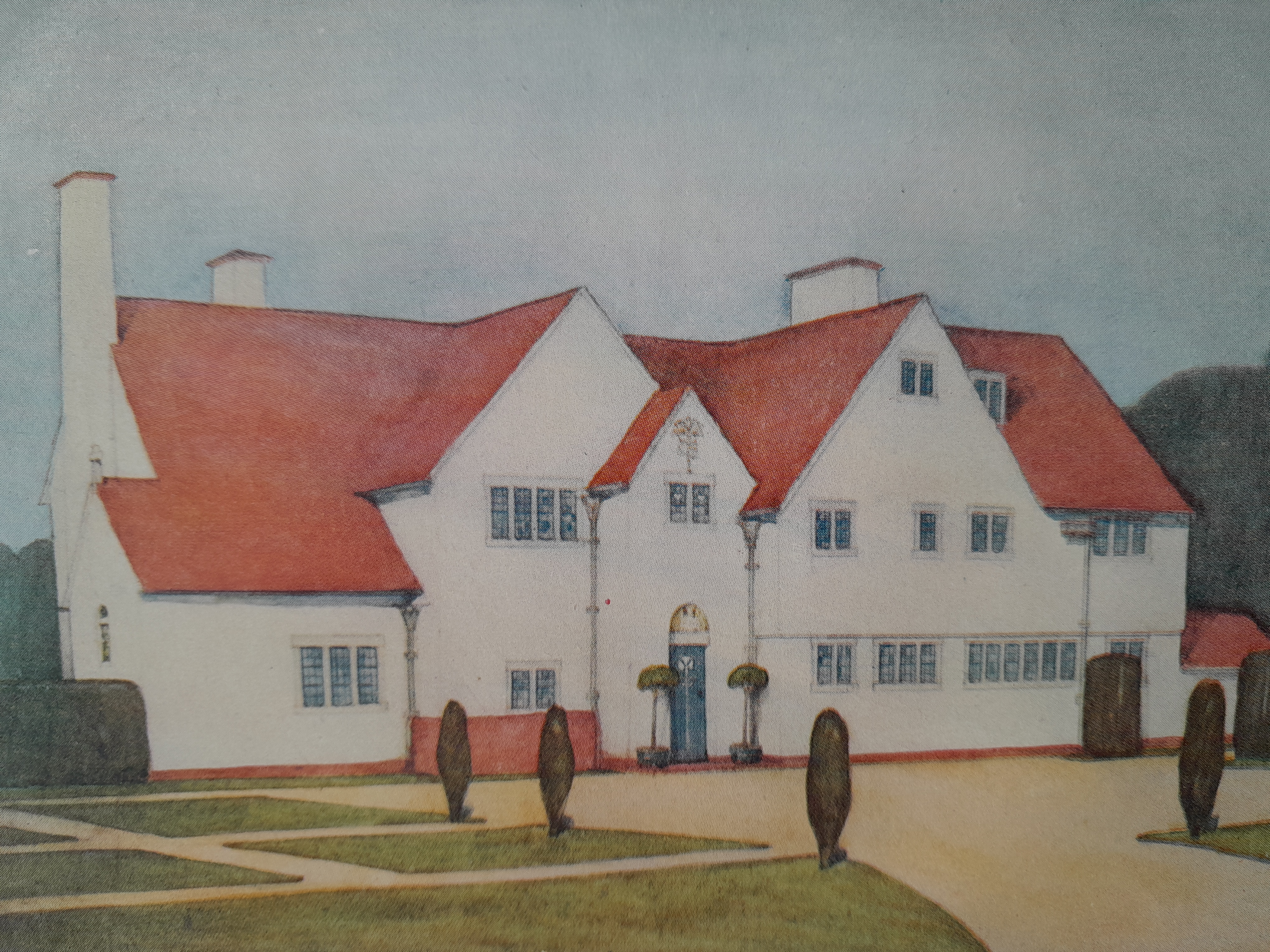
Chaplain's House, St Mary's Home, Wantage from a drawing by M.H. Baillie Scott, Architect

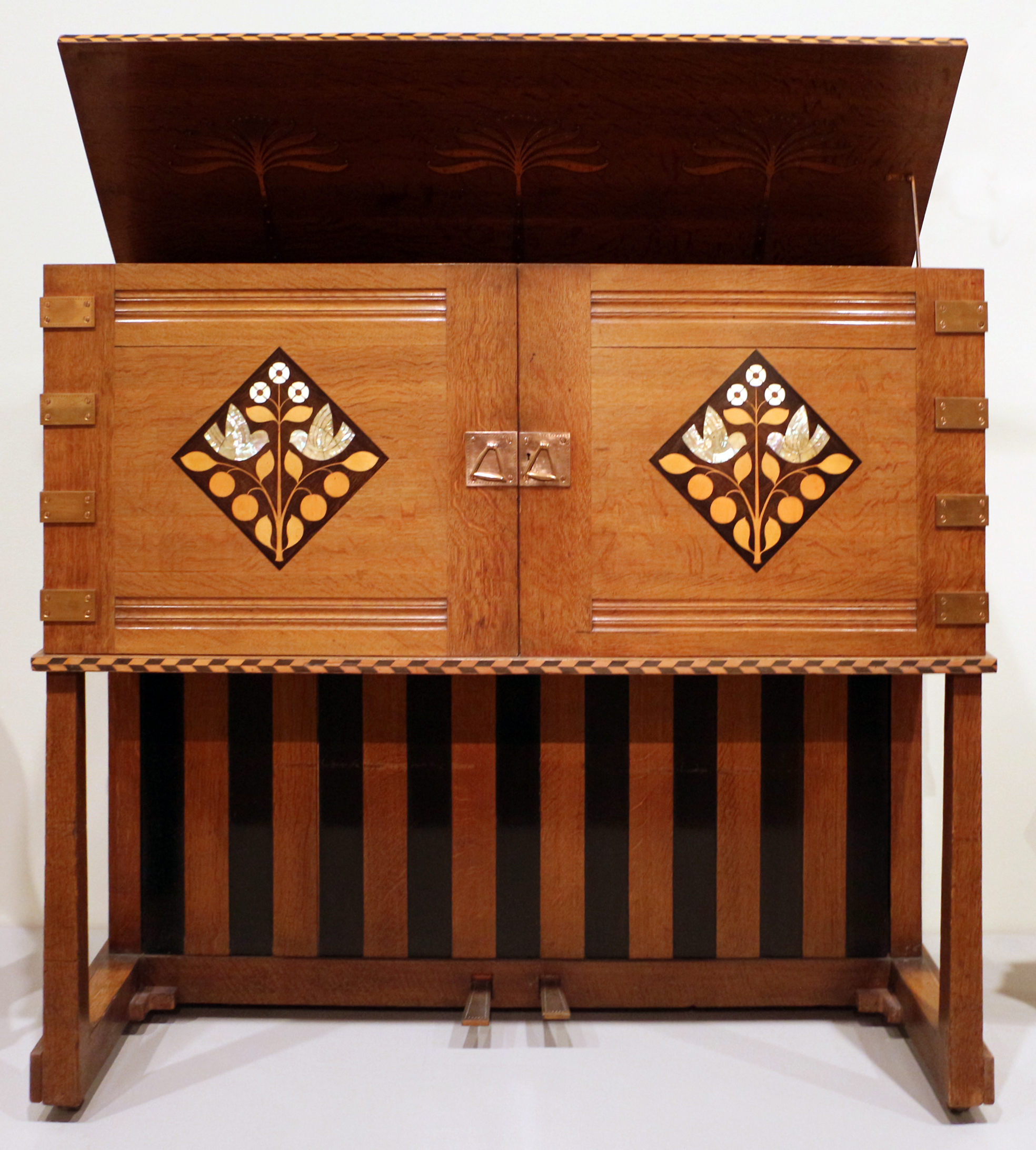
Piano cabinet, 1897, Art Institute of Chicago

- Bexton Croft, Knutsford, Cheshire, 1896, Grade II* listed
- Blackwell, Bowness, Cumbria, 1898–1900, Grade I listed
- The White House, Helensburgh, Scotland, 1899, Category A
- Home Close, Sibford Ferris, Oxfordshire, 1911
- Snowshill Manor gardens, 1920–23
- Church Rate Corner (private house), Cambridge, 1924, Grade II listed
- Oakhams, 1942 (additions; his home)
- Red House, Isle of Man
- Woodbury Hollow, Loughton, Essex
- Winscombe House, Crowborough, Sussex
- Sandford House, Kilmany, Fife, Scotland, Category B
- Majestic Hotel, Onchan, Isle of Man (demolished)
- White Lodge, Wantage, Oxfordshire
- Chludzinski's Mansion, Lieskavičy, Šumilina district, Vitebsk region, Belarus (derelicted)

== Family and later life ==
He married Florence Kate Nash, a descendant of Beau Nash, on 1 February 1899 in Batheaston Parish Church, Somerset.

They had two children:

- Daughter, Enid Maud Mackay Baillie-Scott, born 26 November 1889 died 1968
- Son, Mackay Hugh Baillie-Scott, born 13 May 1891 died 1943

He died at the Elm Grove Hospital (now Brighton General Hospital) in the Elm Grove area of Brighton. His gravestone in Edenbridge, Kent reads: "Nature he loved and next to nature art".
