= Museum of Lakeland Life & Industry =

Coordinates: 54°19′22.908″N 2°44′41.460″W

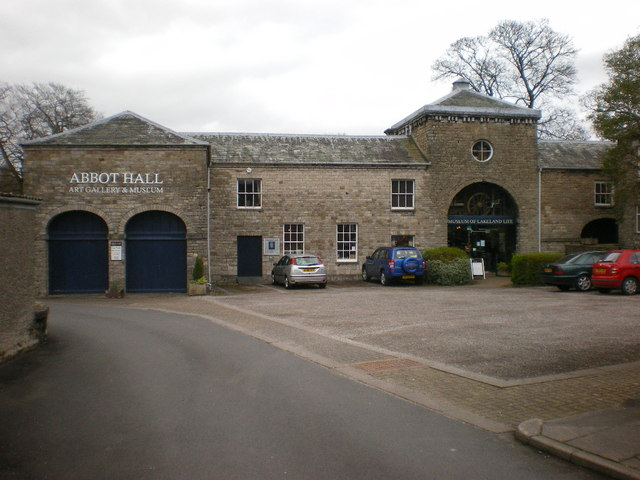
- The Museum in 2009.

- Location in South Lakeland Location in Cumbria
- Former name: Museum of Lakeland Life
- Location: Kendal
- Website: www.lakelandmuseum.org.uk

The Museum of Lakeland Life & Industry, formerly the Museum of Lakeland Life and sometimes abbreviated to MOLLI, is a local museum in Kendal, Cumbria, northwest England.

The museum was opened in 1971 by Princess Alexandra. It won the first ever UK Museum of the Year award in 1973.

The Museum presents life in the Lake District (a.k.a. Lakeland) from the late 18th century onwards. The museum is located within the original Georgian stables of the Abbot Hall Art Gallery. It is managed by Lakeland Arts. The displays include presentations of the author Arthur Ransome and the Swallows and Amazons series of books, local photographers, and the Arts & Crafts Movement in the Lake District.

The museum is the registered office of the Arthur Ransome Society.

As of January 2021 the museum is closed during a redevelopment by Lakeland Arts of the whole Abbot Hall Art Gallery site and complex.
