= Hughie O'Donoghue =

British abstract figurist artist

Hughie O'Donoghue RA (born 1953) is a British painter.

== Biography ==
Hughie O'Donoghue was born in 1953 in Manchester, England. His father, Daniel O'Donoghue, was also born in Manchester, to Irish parents, and was a railway company clerk in the city. Daniel O'Donoghue encouraged his son to study history and literature and spend time in Manchester City Art Gallery. This was to prove a key element in the formation of O'Donoghue's desire to make art.

Equally significant was O'Donoghue's mother, who had been born in Ireland, in the Gaeltacht of County Mayo. O'Donoghue spent much of his childhood here, learning traditional stories and experiencing the landscape around his mother's family home.

O'Donoghue attended St Augustine's Grammar School followed by Trinity and All Saints College. He later gained an MA in Fine Art from Goldsmiths College, University of London in 1982 and was appointed to be artist-in-residence at the Drax power station near Selby in Yorkshire in 1983. This was followed in 1984 by a two-year residency at the National Gallery in London, and by another art residency in 2000 at St John's College, Oxford.

His first solo exhibition was in 1984 at AIR Gallery, London. He then showed in 1987 at the Galleria Carini and Donatini, Florence, Italy, followed by the solo show Fires at the Fabian Carlsson Gallery, London in 1989.

In 1997 he held a solo show at the Haus der Kunst, Munich. In 1998 he staged an exhibition of his paintings and drawings of the human body, made between 1984 and 1998, at the Irish Museum of Modern Art, Dublin and the Whitworth Art Gallery, Manchester. In 1999 he had further solo shows in Dublin and Munich. In 2000 he took part in the group show Geschichte und Erinnerung in der Kunst der Gegenwart (History and Memory in Contemporary Art) at the Schirn Kunsthalle Frankfurt, and then had further solo shows at the Purdy Hicks Gallery, London, in 1998, 2002, 2004, 2005 and 2006. In 2003 O'Donoghue exhibited at the Imperial War Museum North in Salford a series of works called Painting Caserta Red charting his father's experiences in the Second World War. Also in 2003 he held a solo show at the Gas Hall Gallery, Birmingham, then at the Butler Gallery, Kilkenny, Ireland, in 2004, the Fenton Gallery, Cork, in 2005, the City and Áras Éanna Arts Centre, Inis Oírr, Ireland, and Fairgreen Gallery, Galway, Ireland, in 2006 and Galerie Michael Janssen, Berlin, in 2007.

In 2008 his series of paintings Lost Histories; Imagined Realities, was shown at the Gemeentemuseum Den Haag in The Hague, Netherlands, and The Geometry of Paths, at the James Hyman Gallery, London. Another series, called The Journey was shown at Leeds Art Gallery in Britain in 2009, and Spirit of the Figure, was shown at the Sidney Cooper Gallery, Canterbury, Kent also in 2009. In 2010 he showed at the Oliver Sears Gallery, Dublin, and in 2011 at the Galway Arts Festival, Galway Ireland, and at Trinity Hall, University of Cambridge.

In 2005 he received an Honorary Doctorate from the National University of Ireland. He has work in public collections including: Arts Council of England, the Art Gallery of South Australia, Adelaide, the Ashmolean Museum, Oxford, Birmingham Museum and Art Gallery, the British Museum, Ferens Art Gallery, Hull, Fitzwilliam Museum, Cambridge, Gemeentemuseum Den Haag, The Hague, Netherlands, the Hugh Lane Gallery, Dublin, the Imperial War Museum, London, the Irish Museum of Modern Art, Dublin, the National Gallery, London, Victoria Art Gallery, Bath, and the Yale Center for British Art, New Haven, USA, amongst others.

In 2013, he designed a stained glass window for Westminster Abbey to mark the 60th anniversary of the coronation of Queen Elizabeth II.

Hughie O'Donoghue is married to Clare, and is represented by Marlborough Fine Art, London.

== Style and influences ==
Hughie O'Donoghue's paintings are highly abstracted figure paintings, an approach that is said to demonstrate the respect he has in his own practice for the history of art. His method is derived from a knowledge and understanding of the methods of both abstract and figurative painters of the past which he attempts to synthesise in his own work. This respect for the historic methods of making art has led to O'Donoghue being praised not only for his painting skills but also his emphasis on the importance of draughtsmanship in the making of a painting.

O'Donoghue's application of paint can be thick and heavy, reminiscent of American Abstract Expressionism, as in the 'Geometry of Paths' series of paintings. This series was made partly in homage to O'Donoghue's father's service in the RAF in the Second World War, and can be seen as a development from an earlier series along similar lines made for the Imperial War Museum in 2003 called 'Painting Caserta Red'. The name The Geometry of Paths came from the title an old manual for wartime fighter pilots O'Donoghue found in a secondhand bookshop.

In this series, O'Donoghue also demonstrated a characteristic trait in his work of juxtaposing seemingly unrelated ideas, in this case combining his father's wartime experience and the RAF training manual on one side with the destruction during the Second World War of a painting by Vincent van Gogh called The Painter on the Road to Tarascon. O'Donoghue will also incorporate photographs into the painting, often painting over these again, so the paintings appear as a series of layered images.

As this indicates, O'Donoghue uses specific narratives as motivations to make his work, and this allows him to explore 'ideas of place and identity in relation to historical and personal meaning'. However O'Donoghue has stated himself that he does not believe 'that artists wholly control the meaning of their work'. This results in a situation where art becomes a conveyor of incomplete and subjective truths about events such as the Second World War. However, in O'Donoghue's own view, the academic study of history is like this anyway. This means O'Donoghue's paintings are not simply reminiscent of historic History painting in terms of their scale and subject matter, but in the way O'Donoghue conceives of them as a kind of historical exegesis.
