= Blackwell (historic house) =

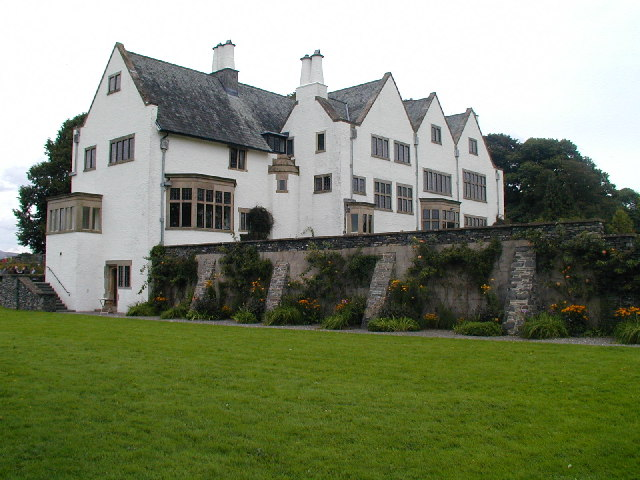
- Blackwell: the south front

- Location in South Lakeland Location in Cumbria

General information
- Architectural style: Arts and Crafts
- Location: Bowness-on-Windermere, England
- Coordinates: 54.3431°N 2.9236°W
- Client: Sir Edward Holt

Design and construction
- Architects: Baillie Scott; Thomas Mawson (Garden)

Listed Building – Grade I
- Official name: BLACKWELL SCHOOL
- Designated: 12 November 1969
- Reference no.: 1124680

Blackwell is a large house in the English Lake District, designed in the Arts and Crafts style by Baillie Scott. It was built in 1898–1900, as a holiday home for Sir Edward Holt, a wealthy Manchester brewer. It is near the town of Bowness-on-Windermere with views looking over Windermere and across to the Coniston Fells.

Blackwell has survived with almost all its original decorative features intact, and is listed Grade I as an outstanding example of British domestic architecture. The house is furnished with original furniture and objects from the period. The gardens were designed by Thomas Mawson in a series of terraces. Flowers and herbs border the terraces, which form sun traps on the south side of the house.

The house has been open to visitors since 2001 and hosts regular exhibitions including work by living artists such as Edmund de Waal in 2005. It won the Small Visitor Attraction Award in the Northwest of England for 2005. The house is managed by the Lakeland Arts Trust.

== Description of house and contents ==
When the architect MH Baillie Scott built a holiday home overlooking Windermere for his client Sir Edward Holt he created Blackwell, a perfect example of the Arts and Crafts movement.

Blackwell retains many of its original decorative features, including a rare Hessian wall-hanging in the dining room, leaf-shaped door handles, curious window catches, distinctive plasterwork, stained glass and carved wooden panelling by Simpsons of Kendal. The rooms contain furniture and objects by many of the leading Arts and Crafts designers and studios – metalwork by WAS Benson, ceramics by Pilkingtons, and Ruskin Pottery and furniture by Morris & Co., Stanley Webb Davies, Ernest Gimson and Baillie Scott himself.

Acquisitions of furniture by Baillie Scott are on display, including an oak and ebony inlaid barrel chair with slatted sides, sideboard and a set of dining chairs. Blackwell offers several rooms displaying historical exhibitions that explore different aspects of the Arts and Crafts movement.

The original gardens were laid out by Arts and Crafts garden designer Thomas Mawson in a series of terraces to achieve views from the house over the lake towards the Coniston fells. Blackwell is bordered by flower beds set against a terrace of York stone paving, providing shelter for garden chairs and tables, surrounded by flowers and herbs. On the lower terrace there is a long sweep of lawn.

== See also ==
- Listed buildings in Windermere, Cumbria (town)
- Broad Leys, Arts and Crafts house on Windermere
- List of country houses in the United Kingdom
