= Julie Brook =

British artist

- Born: 1961 (age 64–65); RAF Rintein, Germany
- Education: The Ruskin School of Drawing and Fine Art, University of Oxford
- Known for: sculpture, painting, installation art
- Notable work: An Dealbh Mòr, Inversion
- Movement: Young British Artists

Julie Brook (born 1961) is a British artist. She works in a variety of mediums in each case with a strong connection with the landscape. She has lived and worked in the Orkney islands, on Jura and Mingulay and in the Libyan Desert.

Whilst living in Mingulay, in 1997, Julie was visited unexpectedly by Queen Elizabeth the Second. It was an unannounced and entirely informal visit. The Queen asked about the island and Julie was pleased to inform her.

== Life and career ==
Julie Brook was born at RAF Rinteln hospital in Germany. She lives on the Isle of Skye. She attended The Ruskin School of Drawing and Fine Art in Oxford from 1980 to 1983.

== Artworks ==
Her works include:

- An Dealbh Mòr (2005–2006), with Bun Sgoil Shlèite, a Gaelic/ English year-long project drawing and painting from the landscape of South Skye culminating in a large scale painting on canvas. Using the painting as a floor cloth the performance reflected the geological evolution of Skye through movement and music. Exhibition and performance situated at Sabhal Mòr Ostaig, Isle of Skye and presented at the Scottish Parliament.
- Out of the ground, a thread of air (2023) in the grounds of Holker Hall, Cumbria, located at [54.1855,-2.9857].

== See also ==
- Art of the United Kingdom
