= Garry Fabian Miller =

English photographer (born 1957)

Garry Fabian Miller HonFRPS
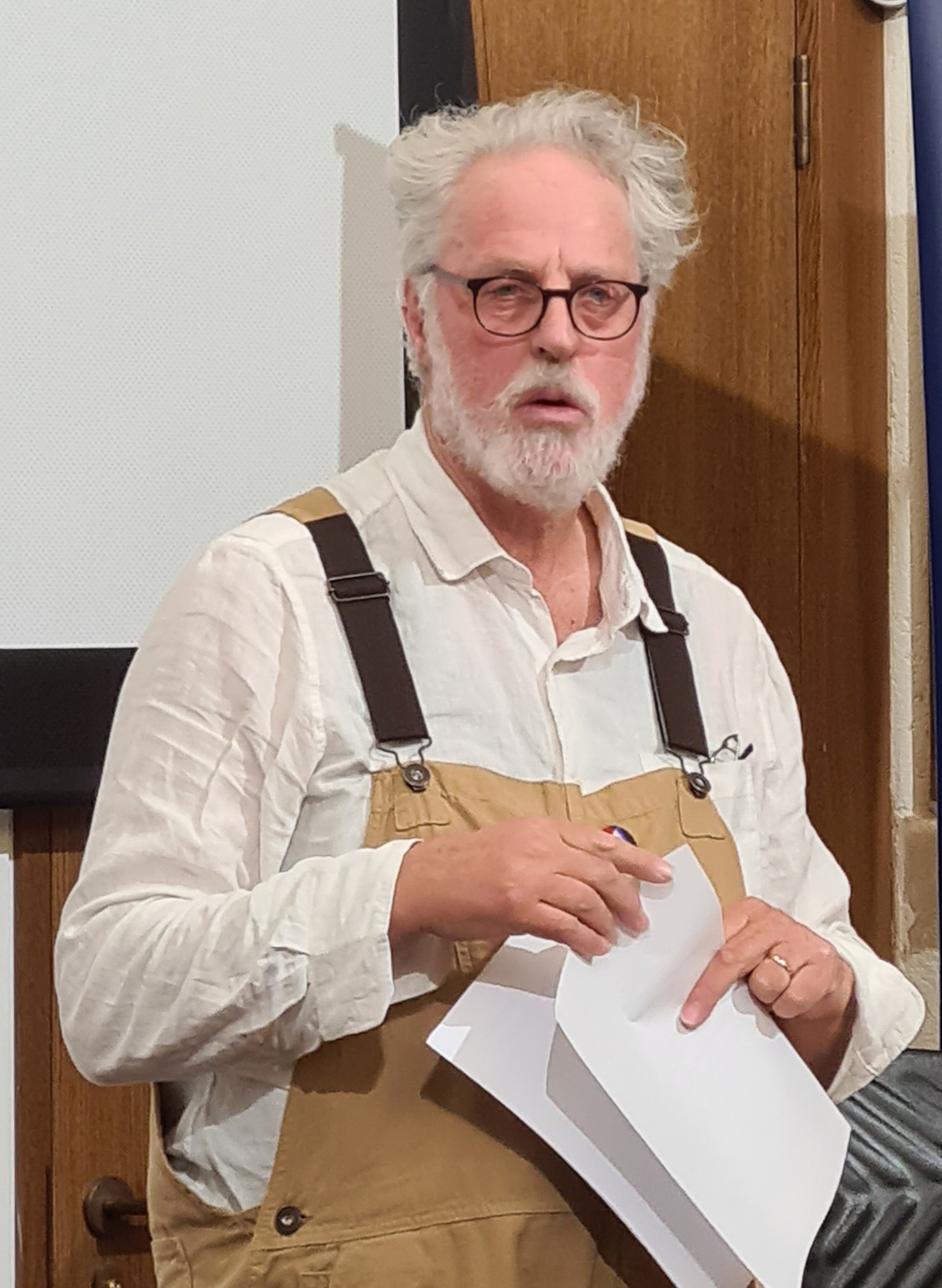
- Miller speaking at the Bodleian Libraries, 21 March 2023
- Born: 1957 (age 68–69); Bristol, England
- Occupation: Photographic artist

Garry Fabian Miller HonFRPS (born 1957) is a British photographic artist. Since 1986, he has specialised in camera-less photography. His work was exhibited at the Victoria & Albert Museum in London in 2005, at the Rencontres d'Arles in the same year, and at the Arnolfini in Bristol in 2023.

Miller was elected an honorary fellow of the Royal Photographic Society in 2017 and awarded an Honorary Fellowship with the Bodleian Libraries in 2022.
