= List of RWA Academicians =

List of Royal West of England Academicians

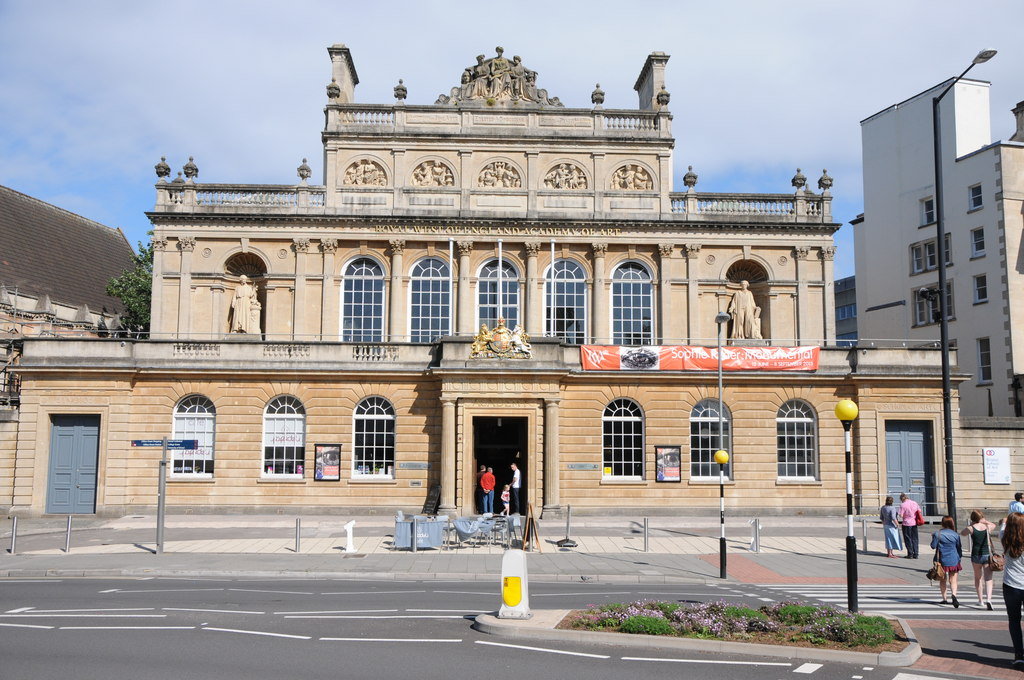
Royal West of England Academy of Art

This is a partial list of Royal West of England Academicians also known as RWA Academicians. The academicians of the Royal West of England Academy (RWA), the oldest public art gallery in Bristol and the UK's only regional Royal Academy of Art.

Academicians have post-nominals: RWA, PRWA, PPRWA, VPRWA or HonRWA (depending on their membership type). A full list is available on the web pages of the RWA's website.

Note. Associate RWA membership has been discontinued and successful candidates are elected directly to full RWA Academician status.

List of Academicians of the Royal West of England Academy of Art (RWA)
Name	Elected ARWA	Elected RWA	Elected HonRWA	Served as VPRWA	Served as PRWA	Retired to PPRA	Notes
Lidija Antanasijevic							
Diana Armfield							Married to Bernard Dunstan PPRWA RA
Malcolm Ashman							
Peter Amos							
Lucy Austin							
Becky Buchanan							
Bronwen Bradshaw							
Basil Beattie							
Clive Blackmore							
Elizabeth Blackadder							
Iain Biggs							
Denis Baxter							
Derek Balmer							
David Backhouse							
Louise Balaam							
Frank Bowling			2021				
Jon Buck							
James Bruges							
June Berry							
James Beale							
John Butler							
Olwyn Bowey							
Martin Bentham							
Nicola Bealing							
Vera Boele-Keimer							
Peter Blake							
Ian Chamberlain		2022					
Peter Clegg							
Eileen Cooper			2022				
Dorcas Casey							
Beth Carter							
Amanda Chambers							
Denis Curry							
Dallas Collins							
Gerald Cains	1970	1978					
Jessica Cooper							
Jane Carpanini							
Nigel Casseldine							
David Carpanini							
P J Crook							
Yvonne Crossley							
Thomas Coates							
Trevor Challinor							
Susan Caines							
Ros Cuthbert							
Chris Dunseath							
Adelaide Damoah		2019					In 2019, Damoah became the first black artist to be elected an academician of the Royal West of England Academy (RWA).
Katie Davies							
Leslie Glenn Damhus							
Patrick Daw							
Philomena Davidson							In 1990 Davidson became the Royal Society of Sculptors first female President, a post she held for six years.
Richard Dack							
Sara Dudman							
Susan Derges							
Toni Davey							
Seyed Edalatpour							
Anthony Eyton							Anthony Eyton retired as an active member of the RWA in December 2004, becoming an RWA (Emeritus).
Karen Edwards							
John Eaves							
Gareth Edwards							
Wendy Elia							
Gareth Fisher			2022				Elected President of the Royal Scottish Academy in 2022. Ex officio HonRWA.
George Ferguson							
Peter Ford							
Peter Folkes							
Susan Foord							
Terry Flaxton							
Ros Ford							
Anna Gillespie							
Christopher Glanville							
Frances Gynn							
Paul Gough							
Sarah Gillespie							
Stewart Geddes							
Simon Garden							
Ashley Hold							
Andrew Hardwick							
Elizabeth Hunter							
John Huggins							
Jennifer Harris							
Moira Huntly							
Ken Howard							
Stephen Hoskins							
Michael Hitchings							
Tim Harrisson							
Trevor Haddrell							
Simon Hitchens							
David Inshaw							
Donald Insall							
Sax Impey							
Luke Jerram			2020				
Judith Jones							
Kurt Jackson							
Robert Jennison							
Stephen Jacobson							
Alan Kingsbury							
Janette Kerr							
Nicky Knowles							
Amy Krauss							Painter and Potter
Juliette Losq							
Angela Lizon							
Allan Laycock							
Debbie Locke							
Cynthia Lear							
Margaret Lovell							
Jason Lane							
Richard Long			2000				Former RWA student, who 'made a plaster path through the college studio to “explore relative movement, using the body as a moving object over still things”...But the RWA staff were less than impressed and, after informing his parents that their son was “mad”, promptly expelled him'. Elected HonRWA in 2000
Sonia Lawson			2005				
Warren & Mosley							Artist and Architect Collaboration comprising Sophie Warren and Jonathan Mosley
Bridget McCrum							
Andrew Muñoz							
Alice Mumford							
Ian Middleton							
John Maine							
Will Maw							
Lawrence Nash							
Rachael Nee							
Midge Naylor							
Camilla Nock							
Martin Parr							
Jane Pascoe							
Ione Parkin							
John Palmer							
Dione Page							
Giles Penny							
Charlotte Price							
Mark Prescott							
Michael Porter							
Sandra Porter							
Howard Phipps							
Simon Quadrat							
Tom Russell							
Anne Rothenstein							
Carol Robertson							
Fiona Robinson							
Mike Richards							
Maxine Relton							
Peter Randall-Page							
Nik Ramage							
Rosalind Robinson							
Karl Singporewala		2022					Architect
Rebecca Salter							
Tim Shaw							
Carl Swanson							
Christopher Shurrock							
Ann Scampton							
Diana Bourdon Smith							
Emma Stibbon							
Howard Silverman							
Dawn Sidoli							
Laurie Steen							
Terry Setch							
Barrington Tabb							
George Tute							
Elizabeth Turrell							
Paul Thirkell							
John Taulbut							
Nicholas Turner							
Patricia Volk							
Susan Whale							
Amanda Wallwork							
Gordon Ward							
Janet Watson							
Deborah Westmancoat							
Lucy Willis							
Glo Williams							
Anthony Whishaw							
Lisa Wright							
Hamish Young							

== See also ==
- List of Royal Academicians

== External ==
- Royal West of England Academy (RWA) — Official Website
- Artworks at the Royal West of England Academy (RWA), on the Art UK site
