= Impey =

Impey may refer to:

== People ==
- Andy Impey (born 1971), English former footballer
- Catherine Impey (1847–1923), British Quaker activist
- Chris Impey (born 25 January 1956), British astronomer, educator, and author
- Daryl Impey (born 1984), South African professional road cyclist
- Edward Impey (born 28 May 1962) British historian, archaeologist, and museum curator
- Elijah Impey (1732–1809), British judge and Chief Justice of Bengal
- Jarman Impey (born 1995), Australian Rules Football player
- John Impey (born 1954), English footballer and football manager
- John Impey (writer) (died 1829), English legal writer
- Mary Impey (1749–1818), English natural historian and patron of Bengal arts
- Sax Impey (born 1969), Cornish artist
- Henry George Impey Siddons (1851–1936), Indian educationist
- Sir Roderick Impey Murchison (1792–1871), Scottish geologist

== Other uses ==
- Impey Album, a collection of paintings commissioned by Elijah and Mary Impey
- Impey Barbicane, a character in the novel From the Earth to the Moon by Jules Verne
- Impey pheasant or Himalayan monal
- Impey River, in the Mid West of Western Australia
- HMS Impey, a Royal Navy steam yacht, renamed from HMS Imogen
