= Christiana Payne =

British art historian

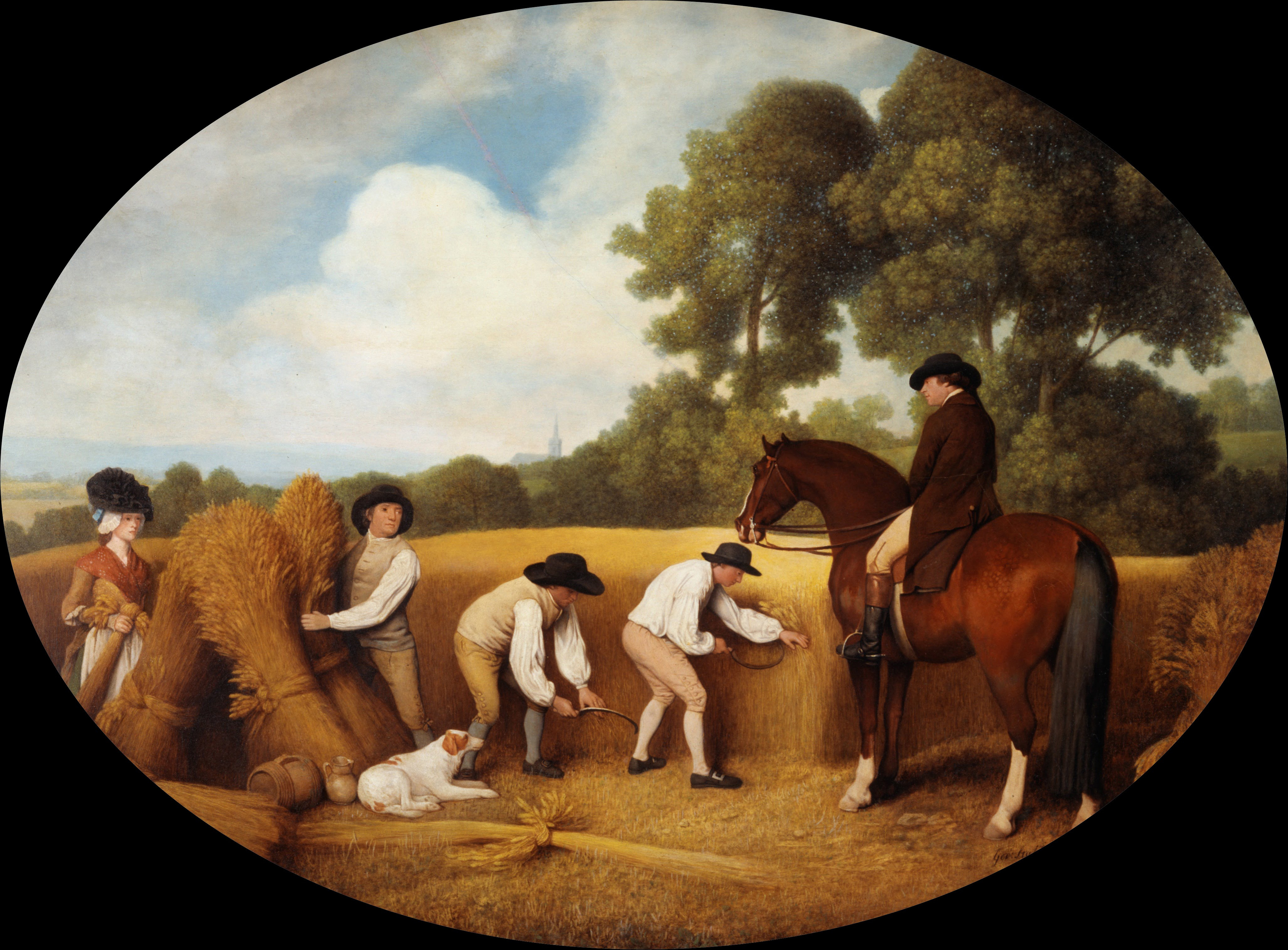
Reapers by George Stubbs, 1795. Enamel on Wedgwood biscuit earthenware. This image appeared on the cover of the catalogue for Toil and Plenty.

Christiana Joan Elizabeth Ruth Payne (born March 1956) is a British art historian at Oxford Brookes University who is a specialist in genre painting and the depiction of the natural environment in British art of the eighteenth and nineteenth centuries.

== Early life and education ==
Christiana Payne was born Christiana Knowles in Oxford in March 1956. She graduated in modern history from St. Catherine's College, Oxford, and then completed an MA and PhD at the Courtauld Institute of Art, University of London where her PhD was supervised by Michael Kitson.

== Career ==
Payne is professor of history of art at Oxford Brookes University where she specialises in genre painting and the depiction of the natural environment in British art of the eighteenth and nineteenth centuries. In 1993, Payne was one of the organisers of, and wrote the catalogue for, the exhibition Toil and plenty: Images of the agricultural landscape in England, 1780-1890 which ran at the Nottingham University Art Gallery from October to November 1993 before transferring to the Yale Center for British Art from January to March 1994. The catalogue for the exhibition was published under the exhibition title by Yale University Press in 1993.

== Family ==
Christiana Payne is married with a daughter.

== Selected publications ==
=== Authored books ===
- Toil and plenty: Images of the agricultural landscape in England, 1780-1890. Yale University Press, 1993. ISBN 0300057733
- Rustic simplicity: Scenes of cottage life in nineteenth-century British art. Djanogly Art Gallery/Lund Humphries, 1998.
- Singing from the walls: The life and work of Elizabeth Forbes. Sansom and Company, 2000. (With Judith Cook and Melissa Hardie)
- John Brett in Cornwall. Sansom and Company, 2006. (With Charles Brett and Mike Hickox)
- Where the sea meets the land: Artists on the coast in nineteenth-century Britain. Sansom and Company, 2007.
- Objects of affection: Pre-Raphaelite portraits by John Brett. Barber Institute of Fine Arts, 2010. (With Ann Sumner)
- John Brett, Pre-Raphaelite landscape painter. Yale University Press, 2010.

=== Edited works ===
- Prospects for the nation: Recent essays in British landscape, 1750–1880. Yale University Press, 1997. (Studies in British Art, 4) (Edited with Michael Rosenthal and Scott Wilcox)
- "The dress of the poor 1750-1900: Old and new perspectives", special issue of Textile History, May 2002. (Edited with Steven King)
- English accents: The reception of British art abroad, 1776–1855. Ashgate, 2004. (Edited with William Vaughan)
- The power of the sea: Making waves in British art 1790–2014. Sansom and Company, 2014. (Edited with Janette Kerr)
