= Judith Cook =

Judith Cook (9 July 1933 – 12 May 2004) was an anti-nuclear campaigner, historical novelist, journalist and lecturer in theatre at the University of Exeter. She wrote several mysteries based on the casebooks of Dr Simon Forman, an Elizabethan doctor and astrologer.

Through the columns of The Guardian's women's page, edited by Mary Stott, she founded the anti-nuclear organisation Voice of Women after the Cuban Missile Crisis of 1962, at a time when the world seemed on the verge of nuclear war.

== Bibliography ==
=== Fiction ===
==== Casebook of Dr Simon Forman ====
1. Death Of A Lady's Maid (1997)
2. Murder at the Rose (1998)
3. Blood on the Borders (1999)
4. Kill The Witch (1999)
5. School of the Night (2000)

==== John Latimer ====
- Dead Ringer (2003)
- Worm in the Bud (2003)
- Keeper's Gold (2004)

==== Other novels ====
- The Waste Remains (1984)
- The Slicing Edge of Death (1993)

=== Non-fiction ===
- Directors' Theatre: Sixteen Leading Theatre Directors on the State of Theatre in Britain Today (1974)
- National Theatre (1976)
- Cornish Walks and Legends (1979)
- Women in Shakespeare (1980)
- Apprentices of Freedom (1981)
- Portrait of a Poison: The 2,4,5-T Story (1982)
- Shakespeare's Players (1983)
- When I Set Out for Lyonesse: Cornish Walks and Legends (1984)
- Close to the Earth: Living Social History of the British Isles (1984)
- Who Killed Hilda Murrell? (1985)
- Price of Freedom (1986)
- At the Sign of the Swan: Introduction to Shakespeare's Contemporaries (1986)
- Red Alert: Worldwide Dangers of Nuclear Power (1986)
- Backstage (1987)
- Whose Health Is It Anyway? (1987)
- An Accident Waiting to Happen (1989)
- Dirty Water (1989)
- Daphne: Portrait of Daphne Du Maurier (1992)
- To Brave Every Danger: The Epic Life of Mary Bryant of Fowey (1994)
- Unlawful Killing: Murder of Hilda Murrell (1994)
- Sleaze File...: and How to Clean Up British Politics (1995)
- The Golden Age of the English Theatre (1996)
- Singing from the Walls: The Life and Art of Elizabeth Forbes (2000) (with Melissa Hardie and Christiana Payne)
- Dr Simon Forman: A Most Notorious Physician (2001)
- The Year of the Pyres: The 2001 Foot and Mouth Epidemic (2001)
- Gill Watkiss - Paintings 1974-2002 (2002)
- Pirate Queen: The Life of Grace O'Malley 1530-1603 (2003)
- Roaring Boys: Playwrights and Players in Elizabethan and Jacobean England (2005)
- "Priestley" Biography of J B Priestley (1997)
