= List of honorary fellows of Worcester College, Oxford =

This is a list of Honorary Fellows of Worcester College, Oxford.

- Lourens Ackermann
- Sir John Benger
- Asa Briggs, Baron Briggs
- Simon Brown, Baron Brown of Eaton-under-Heywood
- Judith Buchanan
- Sylvia Mathews Burwell
- Sir Michael Codron
- Steven Croft
- Russell T Davies
- Ben Delo
- Anne Desmet
- Maria Djurkovic
- Sir Simon Donaldson
- Sir Terence English
- Richard Faulkner, Baron Faulkner of Worcester
- Sir Julian Flaux
- Judith Freedman
- Sir Peter Gibson
- Sir Iain Glidewell
- Alec Graham
- Andy Green
- Sir Jeremy Greenstock
- Ravi Gupta
- Arthur Hamilton, Lord Hamilton
- Helen-Ann Hartley
- John L. Heilbron
- Kathe Henry
- Christine Holt
- Sir John Hood
- Alec Horsley
- Steven L. Isenberg
- David S. Ingram
- Sir Martin Jacomb
- Sir Mark Jones
- Gyongyver Kadas
- Peter Kadas
- Elena Kagan
- Sir Hans Kornberg
- Peter Kosminsky
- Haruhiko Kuroda
- Michael L'Estrange
- David Loevner
- Sir Anthony May
- Sir Richard Moore
- Rupert Murdoch
- Rosanne Murison
- Sir Lindsay Owen-Jones
- Martin Paisner
- Rachel Portman
- Muhammad Habibur Rahman
- Sir Christopher Ricks
- Claire Robins
- John Sainsbury, Baron Sainsbury of Preston Candover
- Sir Timothy Sainsbury
- Philip Sales, Lord Sales
- Sir Anthony Seldon
- Nazrin Shah of Perak
- Anne-Marie Slaughter
- Richard Smethurst
- Sir Stephen Tomlinson
- Peter Vansittart
- Leonard Wolfson, Baron Wolfson

== See also ==
- Category:Alumni of Worcester College, Oxford
- Category:Fellows of Worcester College, Oxford
