= Hilda Murrell =

British environmentalist and peace campaigner

- Born: 3 February 1906; Shrewsbury, Shropshire, England
- Died: c. 24 March 1984; Shrewsbury, Shropshire, England
- Cause of death: Hypothermia (resulting from injuries sustained during a beating/stabbing)
- Occupations: Anti-nuclear activist, diarist, naturalist, rose grower
- Known for: Controversial murder case

Hilda Murrell (3 February 1906 – on or before 24 March 1984) was a British rose grower, naturalist, diarist and campaigner against nuclear power and nuclear weapons. She was abducted and found murdered 8 km (5 miles) from her home in Shropshire. Decades later there was a conviction based on DNA and fingerprint evidence and a confession. However, the case remains controversial and subject to theories that she was murdered by elements in the British government.

== Life ==
Hilda Murrell was born on 3 February 1906 in Shrewsbury, in the county of Shropshire, England, and lived there all her life. Her parents were Owen C. Murrell (1874-1949) and Lily M. Lowe (1885-1949). She was the elder of two daughters, she came from a family of nurserymen, seedsmen and florists going back to 1837. Her grandfather Edwin Murrell established and ran Portland Nurseries until his death in 1908.

A gifted pupil at Shrewsbury Girls' High School where she was head girl, Murrell won a scholarship to Newnham College, Cambridge (1924–27). She graduated with an MA in English and French literature, and Modern and Mediaeval Languages.

=== Rose growing ===
Having no brothers, in 1928 Hilda was persuaded by her father, Owen, to join what was by then a successful and well-known family rose nursery and seed shop business run by him and his elder brother, Edwin Foley Murrell. She quickly developed outstanding horticultural and business skills and took over as director in 1937.

Her energy and organisational flair proved assets during World War II in her voluntary work for the care and resettlement of refugee children in Shropshire foster homes and schools, making lifelong friends of some of those she helped. Her fund-raising efforts included arranging recitals in Shrewsbury by notable performers including pianist Dame Myra Hess and violinist Jelly d'Arányi.

She managed Edwin Murrell Ltd from 1949 to 1970. She had become an internationally respected rose-grower and authority on rose species, old-fashioned varieties and miniature roses. The firm regularly won top awards at Chelsea and Southport Flower Shows as well as at the oldest annual flower show in the world in Shrewsbury. She sold roses to the Queen Mother and the Churchills and helped Vita Sackville-West design her White Garden at Sissinghurst Castle in Kent. Her annual rose catalogue was widely known and respected both for its information and elegant writing; and she also designed many gardens. In a final tribute, David C.H. Austin gained her approval to name a rose after her just three weeks before she was murdered.

=== Environmental activism ===
Walking, especially in hill country, was one of Murrell's favourite leisure activities from an early age; and she had a passion for mountaineering and even rock climbing until arthritis limited her in later life. With this she developed a deep concern to preserve the countryside and wildlife of the Welsh Marches. She was a founder-member of the national Soil Association promoting organic horticulture, and of what is now the Shropshire Wildlife Trust; and in the 1970s she worked unpaid with her customary energy for the Shropshire branch of the Council for the Protection of Rural England.

On her retirement in 1970, the rose business was sold, and she had time and resources to devote to emerging environmental problems and threats to Shrewsbury's rich architectural heritage. She also indulged her love affair with the Welsh Marches by building a Canadian cedar wood chalet high up on the Welsh side of Llanymynech Hill near Oswestry with a stunning view up the Tanat Valley to the Berwyn Mountains, where eventually her ashes were scattered.

She became an expert botanist, and extracts from her nature diaries were published in 1987 illustrated with her coloured photographs and botanical drawings. She was also deeply knowledgeable about megalithic monuments and the history of the British landscape. Other enthusiasms included antiques, spinning and weaving, and birdwatching; and she was a skilled cook and dressmaker, and a voracious reader.

Murrell's central concern in later life was for the growing environmental pollution crisis. She studied the available research with the objective of anticipating threats to nature, and has been praised for her campaigning efforts.

=== Anti-nuclear activism ===
Having predicted the 1973 oil crisis, Murrell became increasingly concerned by the hazards posed by nuclear energy and weapons. She began to research this highly technical field. In 1978, she wrote a paper entitled "What Price Nuclear Power?" in which she challenged the economics of the civil nuclear industry. After the 1979 US accident at Three Mile Island, she turned her attention to safety aspects, and homed in on the problem of radioactive waste, the disposal of which she concluded was the industry's Achilles' heel. In 1982, the Department of the Environment published a white paper (Cmnd 8607) on the British Government's policy on radioactive waste management. Murrell, now in her late 70s, wrote a critique of it, which she developed into her submission "An Ordinary Citizen's View of Radioactive Waste Management" to the first formal planning inquiry into a nuclear power plant in Britain, the Sizewell B Pressurised Water Reactor in Suffolk.

== Murder ==
Murrell was scheduled to present her paper "An Ordinary Citizen's View of Radioactive Waste Management" at the Sizewell B Inquiry, the first public planning inquiry into a new British nuclear power plant. On 21 March 1984, her home in Shrewsbury was burgled and a small amount of cash was taken. She was abducted in her own car, a white Renault 5, which many witnesses reported seeing being driven erratically through the town and past the police station during the lunch hour. The vehicle was soon reported abandoned in a country lane 8 km (5 miles) outside Shrewsbury.

The West Mercia Police took another three days to find her body in a copse across a field from her car. She had been beaten and stabbed multiple times, but did not die from her injuries, instead succumbing to hypothermia. Her post-mortem was performed by Peter Acland who, together with the detective leading the case, Detective Chief Superintendent David Cole, wrote about this and other cases in The Detective and the Doctor: A Murder Casebook.

One theory put forward was that Murrell was murdered by the British intelligence service MI5 during an operation against nuclear protesters. Hilda was the aunt of Commander Robert Green, Royal Navy (retired), a former naval intelligence officer who was one of a handful of people privy to details of the sinking of the Argentine ship the General Belgrano, by the nuclear submarine HMS Conqueror during the 1982 Falklands War.

Labour MP Tam Dalyell, pursuing Prime Minister Margaret Thatcher about the controversial sinking, added a second controversial theory about Murrell's death when he announced in Parliament early on 20 December 1984 that British Intelligence had been involved. Until then, only her anti-nuclear work had been suspected as a political motive. Dalyell raised the issue in the Commons again in June 1985, having originally been prompted to take an interest in the murder by an anonymous phone call asking him to read an article by Judith Cook in the New Statesman of 9 November 1984, which discussed the case. Cook later wrote two books about Murrell's murder, Who Killed Hilda Murrell? (1985) and Unlawful Killing (1994).

Her Times obituary, by Charles Sinker, ended: "Her close friends remember her as a fierce but fundamentally gentle warrior, a Bunyan-like soul on a lonely and constant quest for the real path of the spirit. She died in tragic circumstances, alone in the empty countryside. It is an almost intolerable irony that a life so dedicated to peaceful pursuits, and to the pursuit of peace, should have been terminated by an act of mindless violence." She was cremated, nearly five months after her death, at Emstrey Crematorium, Shrewsbury and her ashes scattered at Maengwynedd, in Wales. A commemorative stone was unveiled in Tan-y-bryn, Llanrhaeadr in 2004 in a birch grove planted on the twentieth anniversary of her death. She is also commemorated on her family headstone in Longden Road Cemetery, Shrewsbury (section 149), along with Murrell Way, a street named after her in the Sutton Farm area of Shrewsbury.

=== Trial of Andrew George ===
Local labourer Andrew George, who was 16 when Murrell was murdered, was arrested in June 2003 after a cold case review of the murder uncovered DNA and fingerprint evidence linking him with the crime.

In court, George admitted participating in the crime, but asserted that he had broken into the house with his brother, who had been responsible for the sexual assault and the killing. In May 2005, George was found guilty of kidnapping, sexually assaulting, and murdering Murrell. He was sentenced to life imprisonment with a recommended minimum term of 15 years, that was likely to keep him in prison until at least 2018 and the age of 51. The Daily Telegraph quoted the investigating officer as saying "I told you so", but Tam Dalyell as saying it stretched the imagination to breaking point to suppose that the body, dumped on a Wednesday, could have lain undiscovered until the following Saturday, despite a search of the copse on the Thursday by a farmer and his dog: "The two would have had no problem finding a dead rabbit, let alone the body of Hilda Murrell". The farmer (landowner) himself has always maintained that if the body had already been there the day after the kidnapping, he would have seen it. Furthermore, Robert Green was quoted as saying, "There are many unanswered questions. I believe that the conviction may be unsafe." In June 2006, the Court of Appeal upheld the murder conviction, saying there was nothing unsafe about the verdict returned against George.

Green, however, disagreed, saying, "There is evidence that Andrew George was in Hilda's house; however, he could not drive and did not match the description of the driver of her car. Since the trial, which I sat through, I have found evidence that would have acquitted him, and that others were involved. Meanwhile, break-ins to my home in New Zealand and continuing interference with my phone and mail suggest that the British state security authorities fear what I might reveal about the case."

A former cellmate of George's has claimed George admitted to committing the crime but said that he was not the only person involved, alleging that the burglary was committed by a gang of youths in search of money for drugs. In March 2012, Michael Mansfield QC called for an inquiry into what MI5 knew about the case.

== In culture ==
Her murder was the subject of a song, "The Rose Grower" by the English group Attacco Decente. It can be found on their album The Baby Within Us Marches On. "Resist the Atomic Menace", from Oi Polloi's debut EP is also about her death.

Murrell is mentioned in Ian Rankin's novel The Impossible Dead and David Peace's novel GB84. Grace, the 1988 novel by Maggie Gee, implicates the British secret state in its fictional parallel to the murder of Hilda Murrell.

Robert Green's book A Thorn in Their Side: The Hilda Murrell Murder was released in October 2011, which he claims, "provides enough new evidence, known to both prosecution and defence but not put to the jury or Appeal Court judges in 2006, to re-open the coroner's inquest into her death." In August 2013, John Blake Publishing released a new UK edition, with an additional penultimate chapter covering developments since the first NZ edition was published. It also featured a new foreword by Michael Mansfield QC and colour illustrations.

Blackthorn Winter, a memoir by Murrell's great-niece, Chloe Davis, is due for publication in March 2027 by Penguin Books. Davis was five years old at the time of Murrell's death and she interviews and chronicles Murrell's life in her memoir.

== See also ==
- Juanita Nielsen – Australian conservationist who disappeared in 1975.
- Karen Silkwood – critic of the nuclear industry in the USA who was killed in suspicious circumstances in 1974.
- Murder of Daniel Morgan – 1987 murder of a private investigator who investigated police corruption.
- Pat Finucane – a confirmed murder of an Irish lawyer with collaboration of the British secret services in 1989.
- Anti-nuclear movement in the United Kingdom

== Bibliography ==
- Sinker, Charles, ed. (1987). Hilda Murrell's Nature Diaries 1961–1983. Collins. ISBN 0-00-412186-4.
- Cook, Judith (1985). Who Killed Hilda Murrell?. Hodder & Stoughton General Division. ISBN 0450058859.
- Cook, Judith (1994). Unlawful Killing: Murder of Hilda Murrell. Bloomsbury. ISBN 0-7475-1822-X.
- Smith, Graham (1985). Death of a Rose Grower: Who Killed Hilda Murrell?. Cecil Woolf. ISBN 0-900821-76-0.
- Murray, Gary (1993). Enemies of the State. Simon & Schuster. ISBN 0-671-71194-6.
- Cole, D.J. & Acland, P.R. (1994). The Detective and the Doctor: A Murder Casebook. Robert Hale. ISBN 0-7090-5355-X.
- Green, Robert (2013). A Thorn in Their Side: The Hilda Murrell Murder. John Blake Publishing. ISBN 978-1782194286.
