= David Cobley =

English painter

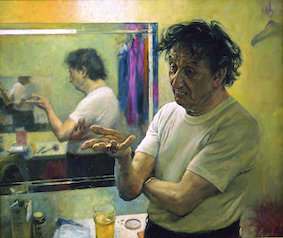
Ken Dodd by David Cobley 2004, oil on canvas, 30 in x 36 in (762 mm x 914 mm)

David Cobley (born 27 June 1954) is an English portrait and figure painter and founder of Bath Artists' Studios.

== Early life ==
David Hugh Cobley was born in Northampton in 1954. He grew up in Higham Ferrers and was educated at the county primary school there before going on to Wellingborough Grammar School and Northampton School of Art. He dropped out of Liverpool College of Art in 1972, but was briefly taught there by Welsh landscape painter Peter Prendergast. He completed a degree in Comparative Culture at Sophia University during his nine-year stay in Japan.

== Career ==
After working as an illustrator he began painting portraits, and was shortlisted for the John Player Portrait Award, now the BP Portrait Award, in 1989. He was elected to the Royal Society of Portrait Painters in 1997, and was commissioned by the Inner Temple to paint The Princess Royal in 2000. His portrait of the comedian Ken Dodd was bought by the National Portrait Gallery for its permanent collection in 2005. Five years later, The National Portrait Gallery commissioned him to paint a portrait of the scientist Sir Martin John Evans.

== Associations ==
(with date of election)

- Royal Society of Portrait Painters (1997)
- Royal West of England Academy (2001)
- New English Art Club (2003)

== Publications ==
- David Cobley: All By Himself by Peter Davies (2019) published by Sansom & Company ISBN: 978-1-911408-53-6
- The Portrait Now (Nairne and Howgate)
