= Amy Krauss =

British artist (1876 – 1961)

Amy Eliza Krauss RWA
- Born: January 1876; Bristol
- Died: 26 December 1961 (aged 85); Poole
- Education: Royal West of England Academy Académie Colarossi
- Known for: Watercolour painting, oil painting, ceramics
- Elected: Royal West of England Academy

Amy Eliza Krauss RWA (January 1876 – 26 December 1961) was a British artist known for painting in oils and watercolours, and latterly ceramics. She is best known for the painting in the Royal Collection in Queen Mary's Dolls' House at Windsor Castle and her close friendship with Frances Hodgkins.

== Early life and education ==
Krauss was born in Bristol to a German father Augustus Krauss and English mother Alice Eliza Krauss (nee Elliott). She was the second of at least 5 children. Her mother died in the 1880s and she was raised by her maternal aunt. She spent her childhood in the city before studying at the Royal West of England Academy, later being elected to their fellowship. She was also one of the founding members of The Clifton Arts Club. She had painting lessons from Alfred William Rich and went on to study art at the Académie Colarossi, Paris from 1908 to 1913. Whilst in Paris she met many of the artists who had influenced her including the Scottish Colourists Samuel Peploe, John Duncan Fergusson and Leslie Hunter. It was also in Paris that she first met Frances Hodgkins.

== Career ==
Krause exhibited extensively from 1907 – 1915 including at the Royal Academy, Walker Art Gallery, the New English Art Club and the Royal Institute of Oil Painters. Krauss returned to Bristol at the outbreak of the First World War and worked as a draughtswoman for the British and Colonial Aeroplane Company and from 1915 -1918 was their principal women's welfare officer. In September 1915 Krauss joined Frances Hodgkins’ sketching class in St Ives. After this the main focus of her work shifted to pottery, firstly working for Fishley Holland Pottery, Devon, and going on to share a studio with Sibley Pottery, Sandford, near Wareham, Dorset. In 1923 she was commissioned to paint a picture for Queen Mary's Dolls' House at Windsor Castle. The resultant work a watercolour Trees and Cottages is in the library of the dolls' house along with works by others including Paul Nash The same year she was again painting with Hodgkins this time at Burford where she set up a small shop to sell her work. After this proved successful that summer she returned to Dorset and set a studio in a barn on West Street, Corfe Castle. The Lefevre Galleries in London held Krauss’ first major pottery exhibition in 1925. Krauss also taught pottery and gave lessons to Don Potter prior to him taking up a post teaching sculpture and pottery at Bryanston School in 1940. Hodgkins was a regular visitor to Corfe Castle staying with Krauss at her at her home, Redlane Cottage and Krauss would accompany her on the opening of her exhibitions in London. In August 1941 looked after Hodgkins there whilst she was recuperating after an operation. After Hodgkins' death in 1947 Krauss boxed up the possessions from her studio and arranged for her ashes to be returned to New Zealand.

== Death ==
Krauss died in Poole on 26 December 1961 at the age of 85.

== Style ==
Krauss painting was influenced by her friend Frances Hodgkins and the Scottish Colourists, and her work has been compared to that of Leslie Hunter. Her pottery was influenced by peasant wares she collected whist traveling in France and Italy. Most of her pieces could be used as domestic ware. These were mainly small pieces which was dictated by the modest equipment in her studio including the size of her oil-fired kiln.

== Public collections ==
As well as Trees and Cottages in the Royal Collection there are two paintings by Krauss in the collection of Auckland Art Gallery, New Zealand.
