= Peter Ford =

Peter Ford may refer to:

- Peter Ford (footballer) (1933–2020), English footballer
- Peter Ford (artist) (born 1937), English artist
- Peter Ford (actor) (born 1945), son of actor Glenn Ford
- Peter Ford (diplomat) (born 1947), retired British ambassador to Bahrain and Syria, now lobbyist
- Peter Shann Ford (born 1950), Australian inventor and former television news anchor
- Peter Ford (entertainment reporter), Australian entertainment reporter
- Peter Ford (Gaelic footballer) (born 1962), Irish retired sportsperson
- Peter Ford (transport administrator) (born 1938), former chairman of London Transport
- Peter Ford (rugby union) (born 1932), English rugby union player
- Peter Ford, better known as Baby Ford, British electronic music producer
