= Agathe Sorel =

Hungarian sculptor and painter (1935–2020)

Agathe Sorel (13 May 1935 — 30 July 2020) was a London-based artist of Hungarian descent, specializing in painting, sculpture, printmaking and livres d’artiste. She was a Member of the Royal Watercolour Society and the Royal Society of Painter-Printmakers, as well as a founding member of the Printmakers Council and was its Chairman in 1981-1983. She was one of the first artists who experimented with making objects and sculptures using print techniques.

== Life ==
Agathe Sorel was born on 13 May 1935 in Budapest. She studied at the Academy of Applied Arts and Academy of Fine Arts in Budapest. In 1956, she left Hungary with her mother because of the anti-Soviet revolution and settled in England. The same year she enrolled at the Camberwell School of Art in London. At Camberwell she spent about a year and a half and met many interesting artists there, including Michael Rothenstein, Robert Medley, R.B. Kitaj, Heinz Inlander, Julian Trevelyan, and Anthony Gross. In 1958 Sorel won Gulbenkian Scholarship and moved to Paris for two years to study at the Ecoles des Beaux Arts, the Sorbonne and etching under Stanley William Hayter at Atelier 17.

== Career ==
After returning to London in 1960, Sorel set up her own studio in Fulham with her husband, painter and designer Gabor Sitkey, and began teaching at Camberwell and Maidstone Colleges. She also taught at Goldsmiths College and in Canterbury." In 1965, she became a founding member of the Printmaker’s Council. The following year, in 1966, Sorel won a Churchill fellowship to travel to the United States and Mexico for two years. After that, she became interested in working with transparent materials and the use of Perspex allowed her to combine line engraving properties with 3D forms. Most of her sculpture is engineered Perspex with both hand and machine engraving.

In 1981-1983 Sorel chaired the Printmaker’s Council. In collaboration with the poet David Gascoyne Sorel made an artist book The Book of Sand published in 2001. The book was a mixture of poetry and printed drawings. Her work was featured in several exhibitions at key galleries and museums, including the Bankside Gallery.

Sorel died in London on 30 July 2020, aged 85.

== Exhibitions (selection) ==
- 1965 – Solo show at Curwen Gallery, London
- 1967 – Exhibition at the Ben Uri Gallery, London
- 1967 - Arleigh Gallery, San Francisco
- 1968 – Solo show at Philadelphia Print Club
- 1974 – Line in Space by Agathe Sorel, Camden Arts Centre
- 1975 – Solo show at Oxford University Press
- 1978 – Solo show at Robertson Galleries, Ottawa
- 1980 – Solo show at the Comsky Gallery, Los Angeles
- 1989 – Space Engravings & other works by Agathe Sorel, Herbert Read Gallery, Kent Institute of Art & Design
- 1992 – Malargalleriet, Stockholm,
- 1995 – Stadtische Galerie, Filderstadt, Stuttgart
- 2000/2002 – Solo shows at Galerie La Hune, Paris
- 2002 – Catalana Blanca, Bankside Gallery, London
- 2003 – The Book of Sand, Bankside Gallery, London
- 2004 – Retrospective Bradford Museum Cartwright Hall
- 2005 – Livres d’artiste at the Bradford Museum Cartwright Hall
- 2006 – Solo exhibition at Lawrence Graham LLP London
- 2009 – Solo exhibition at the Nehru Centre, London
- 2012 – Solo exhibition at the Bradford Museum, Cartwright Hall
- 2014 – Retrospective exhibition at Studio of Contemporary Art, London

== Collections (selection) ==
- The Tate Gallery, London
- Victoria and Albert Museum, London
- British Museum, London
- British Council, London
- Museum of Fine Art, Philadelphia
- Boston Museum of Fine Art
- Harvard Art Museum, Cambridge, MA
- Art Institute of Chicago
- Gregory Allicar Museum of Art, Colorado State University
- Museum of Contemporary Art, Skopje
- National Library, Paris
