= Geoff Smith (British musician) =

- Born: 1961 (age 64–65); Brighton, England
- Occupations: Instrumentalist, composer
- Formerly of: Attacco Decente
- Website: www.dulcimer.co.uk

Geoff Smith (born 1961) is a musical performer and composer from Brighton, England. He was previously a member of the group Attacco Decente. He was a pupil at Varndean College from 1974.

Smith is considered to be one of the world's leading players of the hammered dulcimer. In performance, he plays three custom-built prototype dulcimers sequentially - diatonic, chromatic and a microtonal model featuring 'fluid tuning', i.e. such that individual notes may be tuned at (by) precise microtonal intervals.

Smith has also designed a revolutionary new addition to the piano - the microtonal tuning mechanism. This innovation enables the use of fluid tuning on the piano. Therefore, a diversity of bespoke tuning layouts can be explored and created separately for each composition, in contrast to the instrument being creatively limited to 'fixed tuning' and therefore the culturally predominant western chromatic octave.

Smith's compositions include music for film and dance. His first major solo work was a new soundtrack to Robert Wiene's classic German silent expressionist film The Cabinet of Doctor Caligari. He has performed this soundtrack as a live accompaniment to the film on many occasions. His next project was a new soundtrack to FW Murnau's film Faust, followed by a new soundtrack to Benjamin Christensen's 1922 silent film Häxan. Smith's soundtrack was included on a DVD of Häxan released in 2007 by Tartan Films.

Smith's next film music project was a new score for the oldest surviving animated feature film, Lotte Reiniger's The Adventures of Prince Achmed (1926). Smith premiered the score in 2008.

Smith has also composed music (Salome) for the Japanese dancer Shakti.

== Discography ==
- Ferocious Tenderness (Animato, CD)
- Salome (Animato, CD)
- The Cabinet of Doctor Caligari (Animato, CD)
