= Gill Saunders =

British curator & author (born 1956)

Gill Saunders (born 1956) is a senior curator at the Victoria and Albert Museum, an author, and broadcaster.

== Early career and education ==
Gill Saunders was educated at Dartford Grammar School for Girls, and the University of Leicester.

== Career since joining the Victoria and Albert Museum ==
Saunders joined the Victoria and Albert Museum (V&A) in 1979 and became the Senior Curator of Prints in 2006. Her expertise is mainly in 20th century and contemporary prints, drawings and paintings. In 2010 she co-curated Walls Are Talking, an exhibition of wallpapers by contemporary artists, at the Whitworth Art Gallery, Manchester, and in 2011 Surface Noise, a show of innovative contemporary printmaking at the Jerwood Space in London. In 2012, for the British Council, she curated a loan exhibition of street art prints, which toured in Libya. For the V&A she has devised a number of UK touring exhibitions, including Modern Masters in Print: Matisse, Picasso, Dali and Warhol (2015–17), Facing History: Contemporary Portraiture (2015–16), and Pop Art in Print (2017–18). She is an Honorary Member of the Printmakers Council and wrote an essay on Emma Stibbon for the book Territories of Print 1994–2019 which accompanied her retrospective at the Rabbley Drawing Centre Gallery.

== Publications ==
- Saunders, Gill (August 1989). The Nude: A New Perspective. Cambridge: Harper & Row. ISBN 0-06-430189-3.
- Saunders, Gill (4 September 1995). Picturing Plants:An Analytical History of Botanical Illustrations. University of California Press. ISBN 0-520-20306-2.
- Saunders, Gill (1 September 2002). Wallpaper in Interior Decoration. Watson-Guptill. ISBN 0-8230-5622-8.
- Saunders, Gill, ed. (3 October 2011). Recording Britain (1 ed.). V & A Publishing. ISBN 978-1-85177-661-0.
