= Emma Stibbon =

British artist (born 1962)

Emma Stibbon RA
- Born: 1 March 1962 (age 64); Münster
- Education: Goldsmiths College; University of the West of England
- Known for: Drawing and Printmaking
- Father: Sir John James Stibbon
- Website: emmastibbon.com

Emma Stibbon RA (born 1 March 1962) is a Bristol-based British artist and Royal Academician.

== Early life and education ==
Emma Stibbon was born on 1 March 1962 in Münster, Germany. Her father was General Sir John James Stibbon, KCB, OBE (5 January 1935 – 9 February 2014) one of the highest-ranking officers in the British Army, who served as Assistant Chief of the Defence Staff and then as Master-General of the Ordnance from 1987–91. Her mother is Lady Jean Stibbon (née Skeggs).

Stibbon studied at the Portsmouth College of Art (Foundation 1980–81), Goldsmiths College and the University of the West of England.

== Career ==
Stibbon is known for her large, monochrome drawings and prints which explore the effects of human intervention and natural phenomenon on monumental structures.

Her work has been exhibited globally and she currently Senior Lecturer in Fine Art Printmaking at the University of Brighton.

Stibbon was chosen as the Antarctic Artist in Residence of the Scott Polar Research Institute for 2012–13.

She is an Academician of the Royal West of England Academy and was elected as a Royal Academician in 2013.

Stibbon has a studio at Spike Island in Bristol.

== Exhibitions ==
Ruskin, Turner & the Storm Cloud. Stibbon was commissioned to create the works for a touring exhibition to mark Ruskin's 200th birthday in 2019. Her contribution to the exhibition commented on damage to the French Alps by global warming, by creating a contemporary response to the works of John Ruskin and J. M. W. Turner. The exhibition visited York Art Gallery and Abbott Hall Art Gallery, Kendal, Cumbria.

Territories of Print 1994-2019 was a solo retrospective exhibition of Stibbon's work titled held at the Rabley Drawing Centre Gallery near Marlborough in Wiltshire and accompanied by a book with the same title.

== Publications ==
Fire and Ice, 2019, Royal Academy of Arts, hardcover, 108 pages, ISBN 978-1-912520-25-1

Territories of Print 1994-2019, Edited by Meryl Ainslie with an Essay by Gill Saunders, 2019, Rabley Drawing Centre, hardcover, 104 pages, ISBN 978-0-9926817-8-4
