= Sonia Lawson =

English painter (1934–2023)

Sonia Lawson RA ROI RWS HonRWA
- Born: Sonia Lawson; 2 June 1934; Castle Bolton, Wensleydale, England
- Died: 15 May 2023 (aged 88)
- Education: Doncaster School of Art; Royal College of Art
- Elected: ARA (6 May 1982); RA (26 June 1991); ROI; ARWS (1985); RWS (1989); HonRWA (2005)
- Website: sonialawson.co.uk

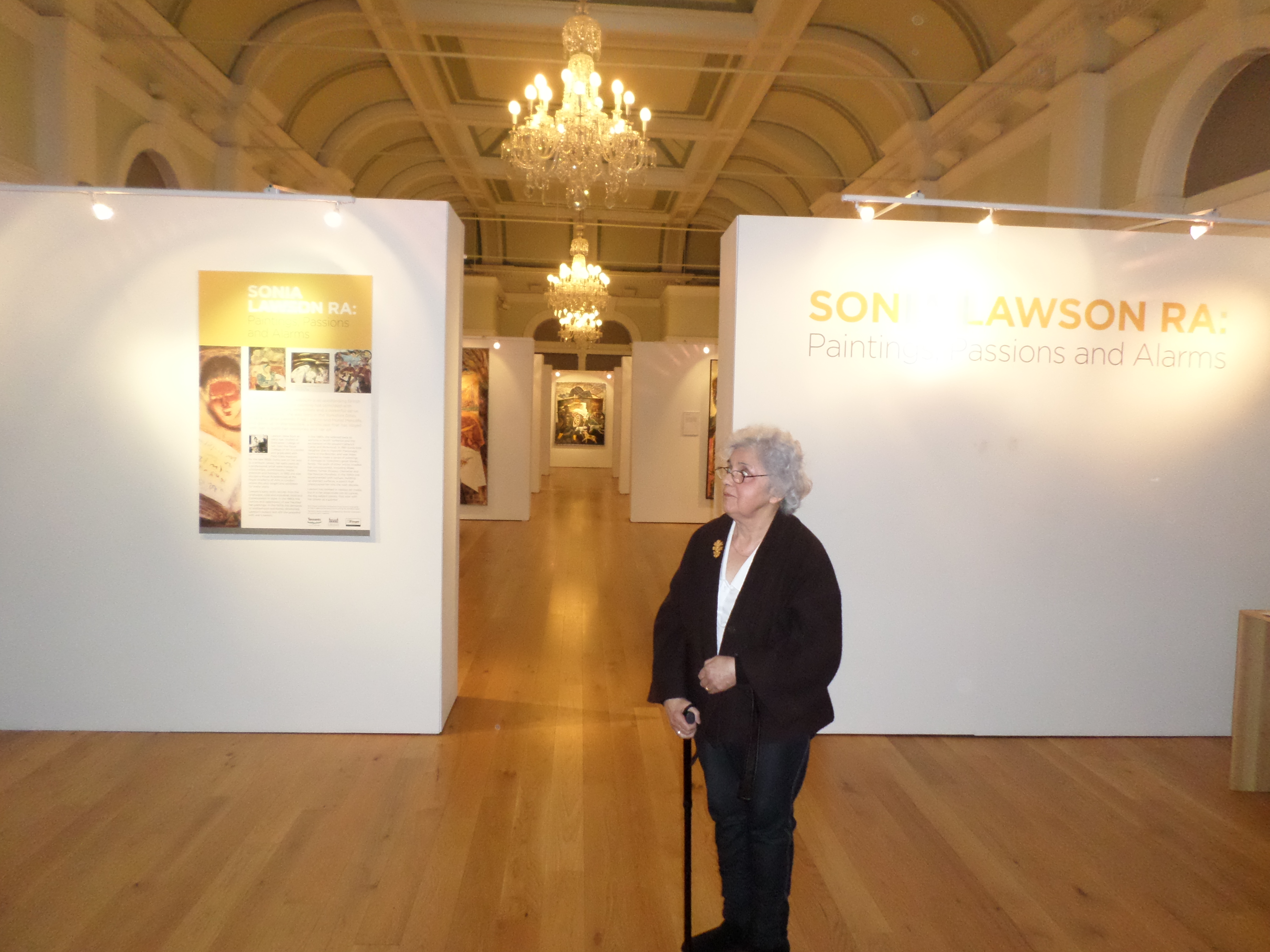
Sonia Lawson at the opening of her exhibition, Mercer Gallery, Harrogate

Sonia Lawson RA ROI RWS HonRWA (2 June 1934 – 15 May 2023) was an English contemporary artist born in North Yorkshire.

== Biography ==
Sonia Lawson was born into a family of artists on 2 June 1934. Her father Fred Lawson and her mother Muriel Metcalfe, who was 22 years younger, both lived and painted in the small village of Castle Bolton, Wensleydale, North Yorkshire. Muriel suffered from Graves' Disease and was unable to care for the infant Sonia therefore she was brought up by her mother's sister: Marjorie Walker (née Metcalfe), in the nearby town of Leyburn. Lawson's love of the Yorkshire Dales informs much of her work and the artistic community her parents cultured also fed her imagination. Visitors to her parents' Dales cottage included

- Jacob Kramer, painter
- J.B. Priestly, author
- James Kirkup, poet (Kirkup corresponded with Sonia's mother: Muriel Metcalfe for many years until Muriel's death in 1995) and
- Dorothy Una Ratcliffe, author & poet.

Lawson studied at Doncaster School of Art in the 1950s and in 1955 gained a place at the Royal College of Art in London. Graduating with First class honours she won a travelling scholarship to France and on her return was one of four young artists selected for John Schlesinger's BBC TV documentary Private View part of the Monitor series. In 1982 Sonia was elected a Royal Academician, an institute she also taught in for over 15 years as a visiting tutor.

Lawson married in 1969 and her daughter was born in 1970. Sonia Lawson died on 15 May 2023, at the age of 88.

== Synopsis ==
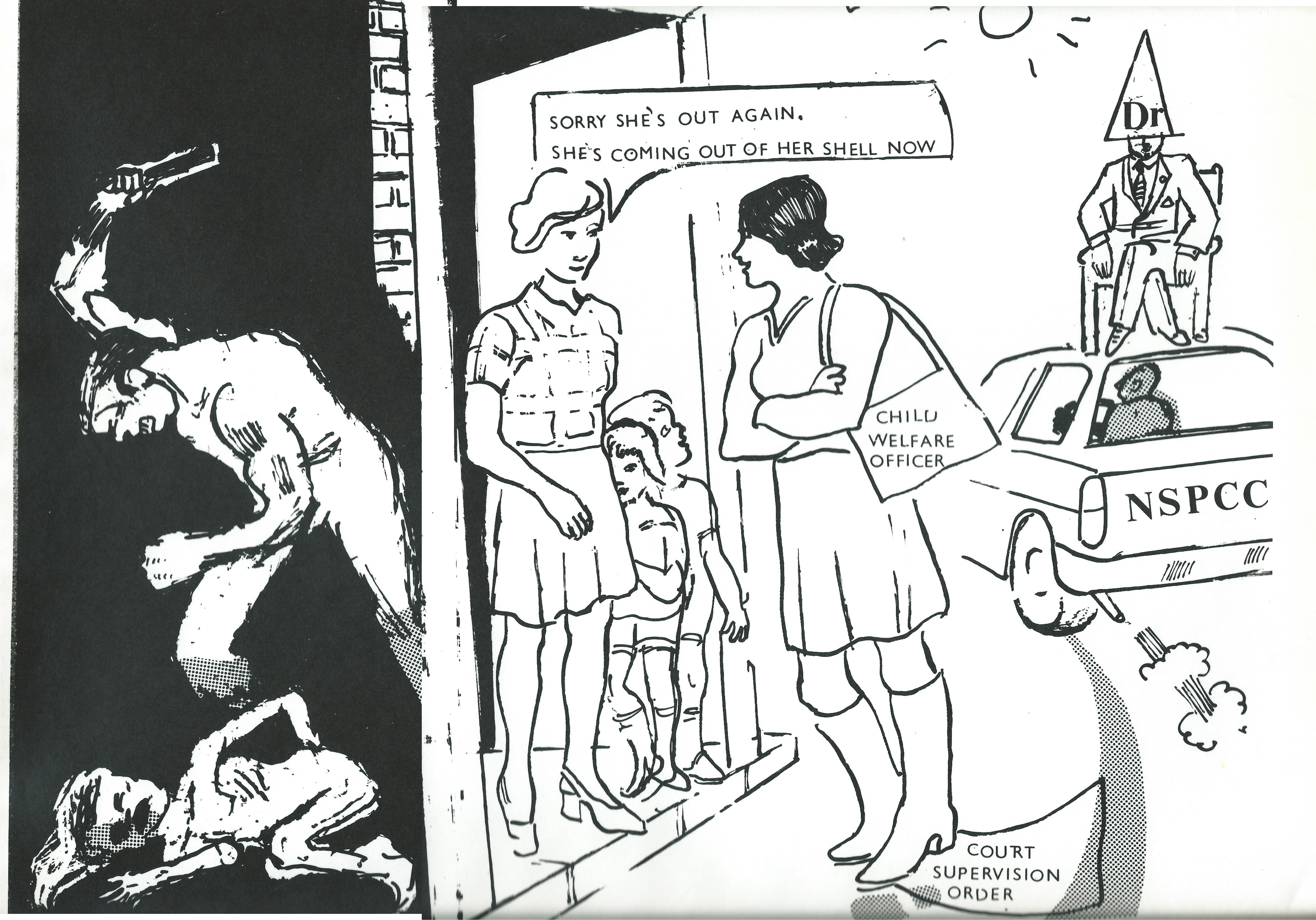
Sonia Lawson illustration for Friends of Maria Colwell

In October 1962, Lawson was one of those chosen for Six Young Painters: Cheltenham Art Gallery. The other contributors were Peter Blake, William Crozier, John Hoyland, Dorothy Mead and Euan Uglow. Lawson taught at Harrow School of Art from 1960- 1965. Other tutors at the time included Peter Blake and Ken Howard. In 1965 Freddie Gore appointed her visiting lecturer at Central St. Martin's art School for a year, following which she taught at West Surrey College of Art in Farnham until 1968.

In the early 1970s Lawson became influenced by the campaign Justice for Maria Colwell against cruelty to children. The illustration 'Coming out of her Shell' shows a sunny outdoor scene where a social worker is fobbed off, while behind closed doors a brutal beating continues. The image does not depict any one child, rather it shows the universal tragedy of failures in child protection: sadly still very relevant today.

Lawson as a painter of conscience, developed a personal vocabulary to articulate inhumanity, war and cruelty. The paintings of this period include a series of untitled works concerning war and show a hard edged realism depicting torsos and demonic like figures. "Figure at Dawn" shows a captive awaiting execution, a painting which, according to Carel Weight, Lawson's professor at the Royal College of Art, is as disturbing as any work produced by Francis Bacon.

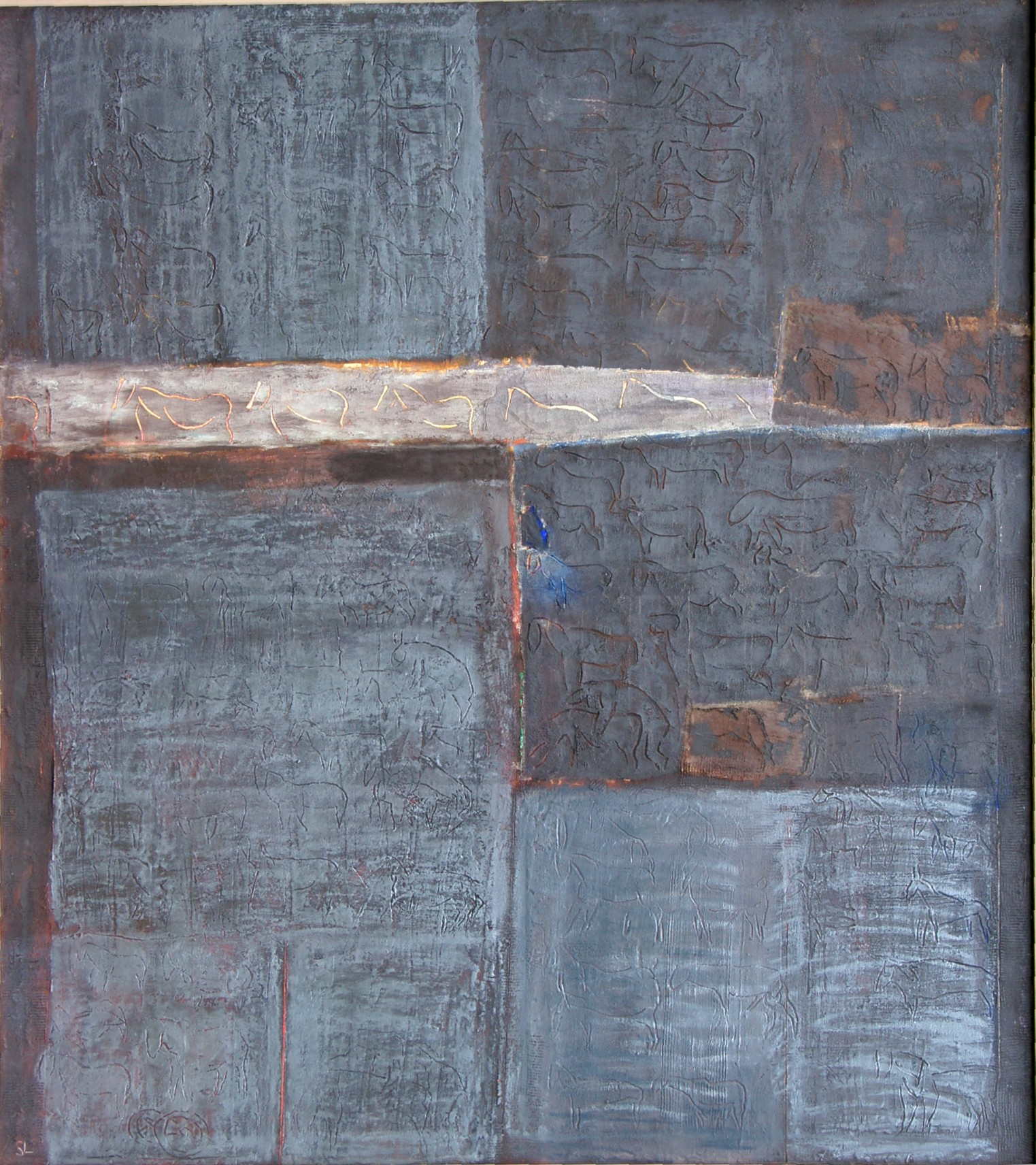
Herd (1996) Oil on Canvas 183cm x 163cm

From February to March 1982 Lawson had a major exhibition "Shrines of Life" held at the Milton Keynes Art Gallery. Sonia Lawson was elected to the Royal Academy in May that year, however in April 1982 she and her husband were badly burnt in a large house fire which destroyed many of her paintings and left her hospitalised for weeks, permanently scarring her hands.

Following this episode, she explored her relationship with her mother, who had suffered Graves' disease and depression, and the drawing "Gallant Child" depicts this theme. Another study Lawson developed was of night reading and writing: linking both her mother Muriel, who would stay up into the early hours with books, pen and ink, together with a trio of paintings depicting the Brontë sisters: Homage to the Brontës.

When well enough she accepted a commission by the Imperial War Museum to record the British Armies of the Rhine Exercise "Operation Lionheart" Wesphalia, Germany. A permanent collection of her work is now at the Imperial War Museum.

In 1989 Lawson was commissioned by the Archbishop of Canterbury to produce a painting for the Pope in celebration of the ecumenical accord. The picture is now held in the Vatican. The same year saw Lawson begin to work as a visiting tutor at the Royal Academy Schools, a role she continued for a further 15 years. In 1990 Lawson's mother Muriel, suffered a debilitating stroke and Sonia became the full-time carer for her until Muriel's death in 1995. Lawson's work developed a new structure after this major loss. She painted "Herd", 1996 using what Lawson called "runes" and searching for a "plump rigorous minimalism".

Equine figures are cut Into the surface of the canvas in Herd. The work can be read as abstract tonal blocks from a distance or hold a figurative narrative when studied closely. Lawson stated:

My interest is to solve the difficulty of using recognisable imagery, yet having the freedom of abstraction.

In 2009, Lawson was diagnosed with Parkinson's disease, however she continued to paint in her Bedfordshire studio.
