= Fluid tuning =

Piano tuning system

Fluid tuning is a tuning system for the piano. It was developed by Geoff Smith, a composer and musician from Brighton, England.

Fluid tuning is accomplished by the addition of the microtonal tuning mechanism to the instrument. This mechanism enables the musician to alter each note individually and separately by precise microtonal intervals. With this design modification, the musician can choose either to leave the piano in 'fixed tuning', or to use the mechanism to retune any number of notes microtonally to any desired combination. The modification, therefore, allows a number of tuning layouts to be created and explored per composition, in contrast to the instrument being creatively limited to fixed tuning which is typically the culturally predominant Western chromatic octave.

The microtonal tuning mechanism consists of a sliding bridge, a groove and buffers fitted to each note of the instrument. The bridge is in constant contact with the strings. If the musician slides the bridge along the groove to any point between the buffers, a precise microtonal interval change results.
