= Printmakers Council =

The London-based Printmakers Council, founded in 1965, aims to promote the art of printmaking (through providing information, encouraging co-operation and holding exhibitions) and the work of contemporary printmakers. Their office is situated in Bermondsey, London. Membership is open to artists, students and interested individuals as friends.

One of the founding members and a chairman in 1981-1983 was Agathe Sorel, a London-based artist of Hungarian descent, specializing in painting, sculpture and printmaking.

== Exhibitions ==
The first Annual Printmakers Council Exhibition was held at the Grabowski Gallery, London from December 1966 to January 1967, with a concurrent exhibition at the AAA Gallery in New York. London venues the Printmakers Council has organised exhibitions at include the Natural History Museum, Battersea Pumphouse, Bankside Gallery, Barbican Library, The National Theatre, The Mall Galleries. Internationally there have been exhibitions and the Musée Adzak in Paris, and exchanges with Landau, Germany and the Printmakers of Western Australia.

== Honorary members ==
Allen Jones, Graham Sutherland and John Piper have been either members or honorary members. Recent Honorary members include Anne Desmet, Peter Ford, David Hockney and Gill Saunders.
