= Anne Desmet =

British artist

Anne Julie Desmet RA (born 14 June 1964) is a British artist who specialises in wood engravings, linocuts and mixed media collages. She has had three major museum retrospectives, received over 30 international awards, and her work is in museum collections and publications worldwide.

== Life and education ==
Anne Desmet was born in Liverpool. Her mother was the eminent English paediatric and neonatal surgeon Irene Marion Desmet FRCS (née Irving; 25 March 1928 – 5 March 2020). Her father was Flemish-Belgian hotelier Louis Henry Marie Joseph Desmet (8 November 1904, Belgium – 14 Jul 1973, England), formerly an oyster farmer in Belgium.

Desmet was born with congenital hip dysplasia, resulting in an approximate total of five years hospitalisation during childhood, recovering from orthopaedic surgeries.

Desmet studied at the Ruskin School of Drawing and Fine Art, University of Oxford and the Central School of Art and Design. She obtained a master's degree and subsequently, a postgraduate diploma in printmaking.

She was awarded a scholarship at the British School at Rome in 1989, is a Fellow of the Royal Society of Painter-Printmakers and a member of the Society of Wood Engravers.

== Career ==
Desmet became a lecturer at the Royal Academy Schools, Ruskin School, Middlesex University and Leeds Polytechnic. Desmet is also a former external examiner in fine art.

Desmet is curator of Scene through Wood - a Century of Wood Engraving, Ashmolean Museum and touring 2020.

Desmet was elected as a Royal Academician on 26 May 2011.

She is an Honorary Member of the Printmakers Council.

== Publications ==
Desmet was editor of Printmaking Today (1998-2013) – the quarterly journal of international graphic art.

Desmet is author of Anne Desmet: A Greek Journey (2019) published by RA Publishing Co. Ltd and Anne Desmet: An Italian Journey (2016) also published by RA Publishing Co. Ltd. Desmet is co-author of Handmade Prints (2000), author of Primary Prints (2010) and co-editor of Printmakers – the Directory (2006) all published by A&C Black. Other publications include: Anne Desmet RA: Towards the Light (Long and Ryle Gallery, 2015), Anne Desmet RA: Time Sequences (Long and Ryle Gallery, 2015), Anne Desmet: Olympic Metamorphoses (The Hart Gallery, 2011), Anne Desmet: Urban Evolution (Whitworth Art Gallery, 2008), Anne Desmet: Towers and Transformations – catalogue raisonné (Ashmolean Museum, 1998); Private Views: Artists working today (Serpent’s Tail, 2004); Wood Engraving and the Woodcut in Britain c.1890-1990 (Barrie & Jenkins, 1994); The Times, RA Magazine, Art Review, Art Monthly, Burlington, The Guardian and The New York Times.

== Solo exhibitions ==
1. Anne Desmet RA: A Greek Journey, Long & Ryle Gallery, London (2019)
2. Anne Desmet RA: An Italian Journey, Gainsborough’s House Museum, Sudbury (2018)
3. Anne Desmet RA – Towards the Light, Long & Ryle Gallery, London (2018)
4. Anne Desmet RA: Under Changing Skies, Holburne Museum, Bath (2017)
5. Anne Desmet RA – An Italian Journey, Royal Overseas League, London (2016)
6. Anne Desmet RA, Eton College, Berkshire (2016)
7. Anne Desmet RA – Time Sequences, Long & Ryle Gallery, London (2015)
8. Anne Desmet – Urban Echoes, Wirral Festival of Firsts, Hoylake (2015)
9. Anne Desmet – Sky Lines, Aldeburgh Lookout, Aldeburgh, Suffolk (2013)
10. Anne Desmet – Olympic Metamorphoses (touring), Pitzhanger Manor Gallery, London; Mercer Art Gallery, Harrogate; Bluecoat Arts, Liverpool; Editions Ltd, Liverpool; RA Library, London (2012)
11. Anne Desmet RA – Fragments of Time, Hart Gallery, London (2012)

== Awards and prizes ==
1. 1st Prize, Lessedra World Art Print Annual - Mini Print Exhibition, Sofia, Bulgaria (2019)
2. 1st Prize, Manhattan Graphic Center, International Miniature Print Exhibition, New York, USA (2019)
3. Honorary Fellowship, Worcester College, Oxford University (2018)
4. Honorary Membership of the Printmakers Council, UK (2015)
5. Juror’s Prize, International Footprint Exhibition, Connecticut Center for Printmaking, Connecticut, USA (2014)
6. 3rd Prize, Lessedra World Art Print Annual - Mini Print, Sofia, Bulgaria (2014)
7. Prizewinner, 9th Biennial Miniature Print Exhibition, Center for Contemporary Printmaking, Connecticut, USA (2013)
8. Grants for the Arts Award: Arts Council England. For Sense of Soane exhibition (2012)
9. Society of Wood Engravers’ Award, Bite National Print Exhibition, Mall Galleries, London (2011)
10. Intaglio Printmaker Prize, Bite National Print Exhibition, Mall Galleries, London (2011)
11. Elected Member of the Royal Academy of Arts (RA) in the category of Engravers, Printmakers & Draughtsmen (2011)
12. V&A Acquisition Prize, The Discerning Eye exhibition, Mall Galleries, London (2011)
13. Pollock-Krasner Foundation Award (1998)
14. Exhibition Medal (1995)
15. RWA Open Print Exhibition (1995)
16. Gordon Tuffrey Memorial Award (1994)
17. British School at Rome Scholarship in Printmaking (1989-1990)
18. Elizabeth Greenshields Foundation Award (1989 and 1996)

== Work ==
Desmet uses collage and print to depict the built environment. She is engaged with the evolution of the urban landscape and its testimony to the aspirations and experiences of humanity. Her abiding subjects are Italy, London and the Babel Tower. She uses the traditional printmaking techniques of wood engraving and lino-cutting but draws on a variety of materials to create distinctive layered collages. Her work ranges from small scale, detailed examinations to sweeping, often fantastical, panoramas viewed from a bird’s eye perspective.
