= Attacco Decente =

British band

- Origin: Brighton, England
- Years active: 1984–1996
- Labels: All or Nothing
- Past members: Geoff Smith; Graham Barlow; Mark Allen

Attacco Decente were a musical group from Brighton, England, active from 1984 to 1996.

The band was notable for using unusual acoustic instruments such as hammered dulcimers, Appalachian dulcimers, and tongue drums alongside more conventional instruments such as acoustic guitar and acoustic bass guitar. Their founder member and sole constant was Geoff Smith.

== History ==
Their lyrics, written by Smith, reflected a strong socialist political stance, especially on the early singles and the first album. The band's first single, "Trojan Horse", featured Smith and Graham Barlow. Acoustic guitarist and backing vocalist Mark Allen joined and they released a 12" EP, "U.K.A. (United Kingdom of America)", the sleeve of which featured an endorsement from Billy Bragg.

The band released their debut album, The Baby Within Us Marches On, in 1988. Barlow left after the release of the "I Don't Care How Long It Takes" single. Smith and Allen recorded the band's second and last album, Crystal Night, as a duo. The band's sound changed somewhat in this incarnation, with the heavily percussive sound of the trio line-up replaced by a mellower, folky feel. There was less emphasis on the tongue drums and more on the hammered dulcimer and Allen's guitar, which took on a markedly flamenco aspect. Smith's lyrics became less overtly political, and more concerned with love and personal relationships.

The band split after Crystal Night. Smith continued as a solo performer and composer, creating music for film and dance. Allen is now a teacher, but has also continued to work as a singer and guitarist in a number of groups.

== Discography ==
=== Singles and EPs ===
- "Trojan Horse"/"Storms Clear the Air" (Timber, 1984)
- "U.K.A. (United Kingdom of America)" (All or Nothing, 1986) – tracks: "The Law Above The Law", "U.K.A.", "Dad Hits Mum", "Touch Yourself", "All Or Nothing")
- "The Will of One" (All or Nothing; 7", 12", CD, 1988) – tracks on 7": "The Will of One" (short version), "One Mountain, One Checkpoint, One Chance"; tracks on 12" and CD: "The Will of One" (short version), "The Will of One" (long version), "One Mountain, One Checkpoint, One Chance", "Together in a Bed of Blossom")
- "I Don't Care How Long It Takes" (All or Nothing; 7", 12", CD, 1988) – tracks on 12" and CD: "I Don't Care How Long It Takes" (7" version), "I Don't Care How Long It Takes" (Hammer House Mix), "Tears of Blood", "Don't Join Their Army")

=== Albums ===
- The Baby Within Us Marches On (All or Nothing; LP, CD, 1988)
- Crystal Night (All or Nothing; cassette, CD, 1996)
