= Thomas Coates (artist) =

British artist (1941–2023)

Thomas John Coates (5 May 1941 – 30 July 2023) was a British artist known for his work in oil painting.

== Early life and education ==
Coates was born in Birmingham during World War II, shortly before his twin sister, Angela. His father, Thomas, was an Irish toolmaker, and his mother, Eileen, a secretary. He had a challenging childhood, often caring for his father due to his parents' absence. His early interest in drawing led him to enroll at Bournville School of Art in 1956, and later, he received a scholarship to study at the Royal Academy Schools.

== Career ==
In the early 1960s, Coates began exhibiting his work at the Royal Birmingham Society of Artists, selling his first painting for just five pounds. Due to limited financial resources, he initially used discarded paint from other students' palettes.

During his career, Coates undertook several notable commissions. In 1990, the Ministry of Defence commissioned him to paint the procession marking the Queen Mother's 90th birthday. Another work, commissioned by businessman Sir Christopher Ondaatje, depicts a reinterpretation of Leonardo da Vinci's Last Supper featuring prominent figures of the Bloomsbury Group.

== Personal life ==
Coates faced health issues in his late thirties due to a pituitary gland tumour affecting his vision, but successful surgery restored his sight.

He married three times: first in 1965 to Pam Hooper, with whom he had two children, Nathan and Hannah; secondly to Pamela Gibbins in 1973; and finally in 1997 to fellow artist Mary Jackson, with whom he opened the Bladon Gallery in 1985.

Coates died on 20 July 2023, at the age of 82.
