= John Impey (writer) =

English legal writer

John Impey (died 1829) was an English legal writer. He was inducted into the Middle Temple on 4 November 1771 and remained a member for sixty years.

== Selected works ==
- Duties in the Office under Sheriff, their Deputies, and also the Duty of the Coroner. (1786)
- The Modern Pleaner (1786)
- The New Instructor Clericalis, stating the Authority, Jurisdiction, and Practice of the Court of King's Bench,' London, 1782, 8vo; it reached a tenth edition in the author's lifetime (1823).
