= Fiona Robinson (artist) =

British artist

Fiona Robinson PRWA HRSA
- Born: 1949 (age 76–77); Springfield, Worcestershire, England
- Education: Oxford Brooks University (BA Fine Art and History of Art) (1989); University of Portsmouth (MA Fine Art) (1997)
- Known for: Drawing; Curating; Writing
- Elected: RWA (2013); PRWA (2019–); HonRA (ex officio 2019–); HonRSA; HonRBSA
- Website: fionarobinson.com

Fiona Robinson PRWA HRSA (born 1949 in Springfield, Worcestershire, now Springfield, Birmingham) is a British artist of Irish heritage who draws in response to music. Robinson was elected President of the Royal West of England Academy in 2019. She served until October 2025, when she was succeeded by Hamish Young.

== Biography ==
Robinson graduated with a BA in Fine Art and History of Art from Oxford Brookes University in 1989, followed by an MA in Fine Art from the University of Portsmouth in 1997.

Fiona Robinson's work

"had its genesis in experimental studies using ink on plucked strings, made whilst listening to the music of John Cage" — Fiona Robinson

Robinson explains that her drawings

"are orchestrated and considered, embracing the measured tones of composers like Bach as much as the randomness of Cage."

After living in London and Cambridge, Robinson moved to Upwey, Dorset in 2002, establishing her studio.

Shortlisted for the 2012 Jerwood Drawing Prize, the V^{th} International Biennial of Drawing Plzeň (2006), the 1998 Cheltenham Drawing Prize and twice for the Rabley Contemporary Sketch Prize (2011 and 2005) and Derwent Drawing Prize (2016).

Awarded the 2011 Drawing Prize at the Royal West of England Academy Open Exhibition in Bristol, the 2007 University of Bath Painting Prize and The Brabcombe Award, Ale & Porter Arts, Bath (2006).

Robinson was an Invited Artist at the International Drawing Biennale in Kosovo, (2008). Prize-winner at the 4th International Biennale of Drawing, Polish Art Foundation, Benalla Art Gallery and The Steps Gallery, Melbourne, 2007.

== Selected exhibitions ==
=== Solo exhibitions ===
Sonografie. Le immagini della musica, Centro Internazionale d'Arte di Palazzo del Te, Mantua

Drawing Debussy, Royal West of England Academy

Robinson was a guest on the BBC Radio 4 programme Soul Music (radio series), Series 26, where she discussed Prélude à l'après-midi d'un faune by Claude Debussy which was featured in the exhibition Drawing Debussy.
[Producer: Maggie Ayre. First broadcast on BBC Radio 4 in April 2018.]

=== Invited Artist ===
International Drawing Biennale, Kosovo, 2008

=== Group exhibitions ===
Pushing Paper: Contemporary Drawing from 1970 to Now

A British Museum touring exhibition

- Prints and Drawings Room, British Museum
- Oriental Museum, Durham University
- Pier Arts Centre, Stromness
- Glynn Vivian Art Gallery, Swansea
- Cooper Gallery, Barnsley

Seeing Sound: Music, imagery and inspiration, Fitzwilliam Museum

Women with Vision, Royal West of England Academy

== Selected public collections ==
- British Museum
- Fitzwilliam Museum
- Royal West of England Academy, Bristol
- Swindon Museum and Art Gallery
- University of Bath
- Polish Art Foundation, Melbourne
- Ballinglen Museum of Contemporary Art, County Mayo
