= Derek Balmer =

British artist and photographer

Derek Balmer PPRWA
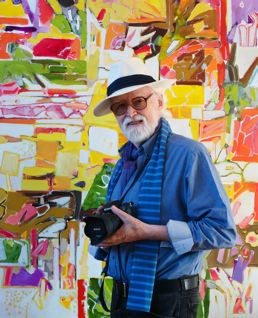
- Derek Balmer
- Born: 28 December 1934; London, United Kingdom
- Education: West of England College of Art
- Known for: Painting; photography
- Elected: President of the Royal West of England Academy (2001 – 2010); Pro-Chancellor of the University of the West of England (2001 – 2010)

Derek Balmer PPRWA (born 28 December 1934) is a British artist and photographer, Past President of the Royal West of England Academy (2001–10) and Pro-Chancellor of the University of the West of England (2001–10) to Chancellor Dame Elizabeth Butler-Sloss. He received an Honorary Doctorate (for Art) from the University of the West of England in 2001.

== Early life ==
Balmer was born in London in 1934 although his professional art education began in Bristol when he was admitted, aged 15 in 1950, to the West of England College of Art, then situated within the Royal West of England Academy, an institution of which he was later to become president. Offered a place at the Slade School of Art in London at 17, he turned it down as his family could not afford the expense. Instead he became apprenticed to a photo-litho firm in Bristol, working as a photographer. Art studies at the College continued via evening classes and at 21, he had a painting accepted for exhibition at the Royal West of England Academy where he has exhibited every year since. Group and solo shows followed at the Finbarrus Gallery in Bath (1958/9).

Balmer established himself as an independent photographer and friendships with Tom Stoppard and film-maker John Boorman among others, drew him into the active theatre scene in Bristol in the 60s that centred round the Bristol Old Vic under Sir Tyrone Guthrie. Balmer was appointed official photographer to the company in 1961, a position he held for the next 28 years. At the same time, he was invited to write art criticism for the Western Daily Press, a position he held for seven years from 1961–1968 until the column closed. With the Arnolfini Gallery opening in 1961 and the Bristol City Art Gallery mounting shows, Balmer found himself reviewing artists such as Frank Auerbach, Keith Vaughan, Joseph Herman and Bryan Winter among others.

== Career ==
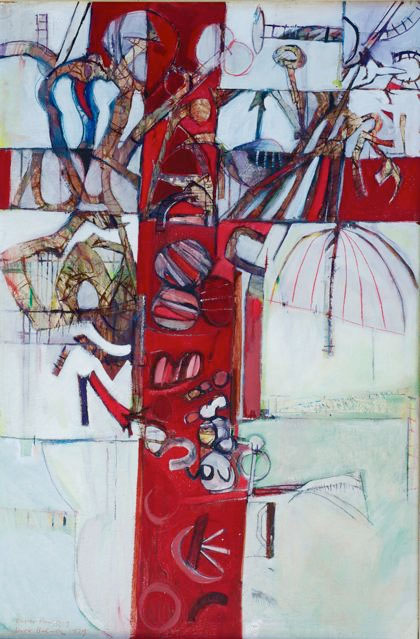
Easter Painting 1979, 122 x 81cm Oil on Canvas

Despite the demands of his professional photographic career, Balmer continued to paint, travelling widely in Southern Europe to look at painting, architecture and sculpture. His work, initially influenced by Graham Sutherland, soon developed a strongly colouristic, expressive quality, his largely landscape-inspired subjects of the 1960s and 1970s being treated in an increasingly semi-abstract manner. His influences drew on a wide range of sources – Pierre Bonnard, Peter Lanyon, John Hoyland and American abstract expressionists like Gorky and de Kooning among others. By the time he had his first solo show at the Arnolfini Gallery in 1968, he had however arrived at an intensely personal style of his own, one that began to attract notice from the London critics, Neville Wallis of The Observer predicting that "one day Balmer will set Bond Street on fire".

During the 1970s, Balmer sought to make a success of his photographic business and support his young family, largely withdrawing from exhibiting his work other than at the Royal West of England Academy where he had become an Associate member in 1955. By the 1980s, his work had gained in expressive richness and confidence and Balmer started putting his work into a wider variety of exhibitions. By the early 1990s, having given up his photographic business, he became involved in the Royal West of England Academy affairs, in 1993 being elected to the Academy Council, then becoming Academicians' Chairman and President in 2001.

He inaugurated a year-round exhibition programme with solo shows being given to artists as distinguished as Richard Long, Bert Irvin, Gillian Ayres and Maurice Cockrill. New gallery spaces were opened, a Friends' organization set up and the institution's important collection of art was at last properly conserved and curated. Balmer had seen the Academy through a major shift in its affairs and he retired from the position in 2009.

A major retrospective of his work at the Academy in 2007 entitled 'President's Eye' was accompanied by an almost yearly sequence of exhibitions at private galleries in the UK and Holland over the decade and in the years since his retirement from the presidency, he has been showing regularly at the Catto Gallery, London. The Theatre Royal/Bristol Old Vic are celebrating their 250th anniversary with a major exhibition at the Royal West of England Academy which includes a gallery full of his theatre photographs (a 27-year retrospective), closing at the end of January 2016.

== Personal life ==
Derek Balmer is married to Elizabeth and has two children.

== Publications ==
Derek Balmer: A Singular Vision by Derek Balmer, Andrew Lambirth, ACH Smith – Samsom & Company 2012 (a memoir by the artist)

== Recent exhibitions ==
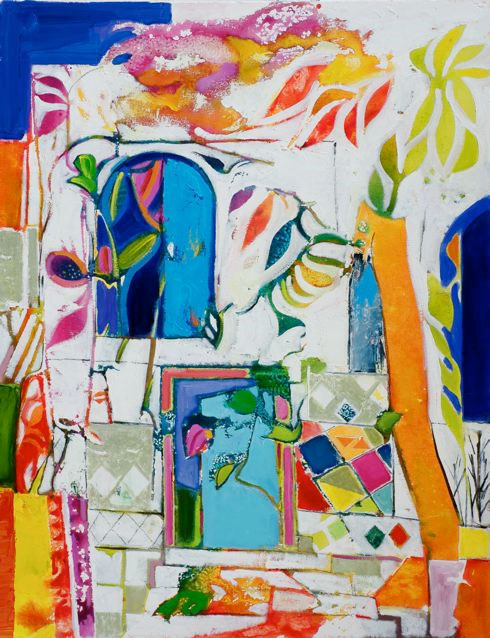
Mérida 2015, 91 x 71cm Oil on canvas

- 2016: 27 year Retrospective, The Theatre Royal/Bristol Old Vic
- 2015: Solo Exhibition, Bath Contemporary, Bath
- 2014: Solo Exhibition, Catto Gallery, London
- 2014: Group Exhibition, Hilton Fine Art, Bath Campden Gallery, Chipping Campden
- 2012: Solo Exhibition, Catto Gallery, London
- 2011: Solo Exhibition, Campden Gallery, Chipping Campden
- 2010: Joint Exhibition, Catto Gallery, London
- 2010: Group Exhibition, Browse and Darby, London, Critic's choice (Andrew Lambirth, The Spectator) and Summer Show
- 2008: Solo Exhibition, Campden Gallery, Chipping Campden
- 2007: Solo Exhibition, 'Presidents Eye' major retrospective, Royal West of England Academy, Bristol
- 2006: Group Exhibition, 'Discerning Eye' Mall Galleries, London. Invited Artist (Nicholas Usherwood)
- 2006: Group Exhibition, Cube Gallery, Bristol
- 2005: Solo Exhibition, Campden Gallery, Chipping Campden
- 2005: Solo Exhibition, Six Chapel Row, Bath with Anthony Hepworth Fine Art
- 2005-10: Group Exhibition, Royal Academy Summer Exhibition
- 2004: Group Exhibition, 'Western Approaches' Campden Gallery, Chipping Campden
- 2004: Group Exhibition, Six Chapel Row, Bath
- 2003: Group Exhibition, Royal West of England Academy, New Gallery
- 2002: Solo Exhibition, Smelik and Stokking Gallery, Amsterdam, Holland
- 1997, 2004: Solo Exhibition, Gisela van Beers Gallery, London
- 1996, 1998, 2000: Solo Exhibition, Smelik and Stokking Gallery, The Hague, Holland
- Annually since 1956: Royal West of England Academy, Bristol
