= Sax Impey =

- Born: 1969 (age 55–56); Penzance
- Known for: Painting, Contemporary Visual Art

Sax Impey is a British artist. He currently lives and works in St Ives, Cornwall, England, occupying a Porthmeor studio and continuing in the tradition of Patrick Heron, Ben Nicholson, and other recognized artists.

== Career ==
Sax Impey was born in Penzance in 1969 and gained a BA (Hons) in fine art at the University of Wales, Newport, in 1991. He then went to East Africa where he participated in film, theatre and performance projects before returning to Cornwall to paint. In 1995 he was elected a member of the Newlyn Society of Artists and in 1997 was awarded a 'Kunstbrucke' residency in Berlin. In 2005 he collaborated with the cross-cultural, environmental art group Red Earth in the creation of site-specific installations in Trafalgar Square, London, and at Birling Gap in Sussex.

Since 2005 Impey has produced work derived almost exclusively from experiences at sea - a qualified RYA Yachtmaster he has sailed many thousands of nautical miles delivering yachts around the world. These extensive trips have had a profound impact on his life and subsequent development as an artist.

Impey has been exhibiting with Millennium, St Ives, since 2002, where he continues to have solo exhibitions. Recent solo exhibitions at Millennium have included 'The Light and the Veil' 2013, 'Storm' 2011, 'Voyage' 2009 and 'Sea' 2007.

In 2007 Impey's work was selected for the ‘Art Now Cornwall’ exhibition at the Tate St Ives where he was placed on the cover of the associated publication. The same year he was heralded in The Times as one of the ‘New Faces of Cornish Art’. In 2010 Sax was featured in Owen Sheers's BBC4 Documentary ‘Art of the Sea (In Pictures)’ alongside Anish Kapoor, J. M. W. Turner, Martin Parr and Maggi Hambling among others.

A solo exhibition of new work entitled 'Storm - Paintings and Drawings' took place at CGP London in 2012. Impey has also been represented in a number of group shows in Berlin, London, Owen Sound Canada, Cardiff, Newlyn, Tate St Ives and elsewhere. His paintings are in numerous collections including The Arts Council, Warwick University, the Connaught Hotel, Terence Disdale Design, Travelex and private collections worldwide. Impey's work was selected as a finalist the 2013 Threadneedle Prize.

Sax Impey was elected an Academician at the Royal West of England Academy in 2012.
