= Peter Ford (artist) =

English artist

Peter Ford RE, RWA (born 1937) is an English artist, specifically a printmaker.

Ford was born in Hereford, England. He studied at Hereford College of Arts, Brighton College of Art, and the University of London.

Since 1987, he has been the Artistic Director of the Off-Centre Gallery in Bristol.

He is an Honorary Member of the Printmakers Council.

Ford's work can be found in public collections around the world including: Musée de la Publicité, Paris, France; Pan Asia Paper Museum, Jeonju, Republic of Korea; Kaliningrad Art Gallery, Russia; Barcelona Museum of Contemporary Art, Spain; Taipei Fine Arts Museum, Taiwan; Bristol City Museum and Art Gallery, Bristol, UK; Tate Gallery, London, UK; Victoria and Albert Museum, London, UK; Ashmolean Museum, Oxford, UK; Portland Museum of Art, Oregon, USA; and other public collections in Egypt, Ireland, Russia, Slovakia, and the United Kingdom.
