= Sansom & Company =

British art publishing company

Sansom & Company logo

Sansom & Company are art publishers based in Bristol, England. The company specialises in modern British art, and particularly the painters and sculptors of the Cornish art colonies at Newlyn, Lamorna and St Ives. The company has published books on artists related to those colonies such as Lamorna Birch, Elizabeth Forbes, T.C. Gotch, Harold Harvey, Charles Simpson, Tom Early, Bryan Pearce and Alfred Wallis.

The firm was founded in 1995 by John Sansom, who had earlier founded the Redcliffe Press, a company that publishes books about Bristol, and Art Dictionaries Ltd.
