= Janette Kerr =

British painter

Janette Kerr PPRWA HRSA
- Born: 1959 (age 66–67)
- Education: University of West England (PhD)
- Elected: President of the RWA (2011-2016); RWA Academician (2003)
- Website: janettekerr.co.uk

Janette Kerr PPRWA HRSA (b. 1959) is a British painter of land and seascapes.

Janette Kerr served as the president of the Royal West of England Academy from 2011 to 2016 and then became a visiting research fellow in Fine Art at the University of the West of England. Kerr is an Honorary Royal Scottish Academy of Art and Architecture Academician.

From 1980 to 1993, Kerr taught as a full-time lecturer in painting, printmaking and drawing at the City of Bath College. In 2005 Kerr completed a PhD in Fine Art at the University of West England.

Janette Kerr is known for her paintings of the far North and High Arctic including the Shetland Isles, Ireland, Norway and Iceland and works en-plein-air. Her direct experience of the coastline—the weather, the ocean, the people who live and work there and oceanographic studies, feature in her art. Kerr's residencies include Nes International art residency, Skagaströnd, NW Iceland (2020), Arctic Circle Programme expedition (2016), Meteorological Institute, Bergen, Norway, Brisons Veor, Cape Cornwall and Shetland Fishing Stations (2012) and Cill Rialaig in Ireland . In Norway, Kerr 'worked alongside Norwegian oceanographers at the meteorological Institute in Bergen studying the unpredictability of waves and wind, which had a profound influence on her work.' Kerr's collaborative work includes 'Confusing Shadow with Substance', a film and sound installation in Shetland, exhibited at the Shetland Museum and project funded by Creative Scotland.

Janette Kerr's paintings 'acknowledge the legacy of the 18th Century Romantic Sublime, confrontations with nature in its most elemental state.' Her paintings involve 'extremes and instabilities: peripheries and promontories – places of rapid change and shifts, both physically and meteorologically.'

'Contemporary and experimental, Janette does not aim to create meticulous studies of the landscape, preferring instead to respond to what is sensed rather than what is seen. Her paintings explore the boundaries between representation and abstraction whilst embodying the power and immediacy of both land and sea.'

Kerr's work can be seen in public collections including the Maine Maritime Museum, USA, Royal Collection, London, Shetland Arts, Shetland Isles, NorthLink Ferries, Scotland, Norwegian Meteorological Institute, Bergen, Norway, Dublin Office of Public Works, RWA Permanent Collection, Tallboys Bequest Bristol, Victoria Art Gallery Print Collection, Bath, Grizedale Society, Cumbria and the Colle Verde Art Trust, Tuscany.
