= Royal West of England Academy =

Art gallery in Bristol, England

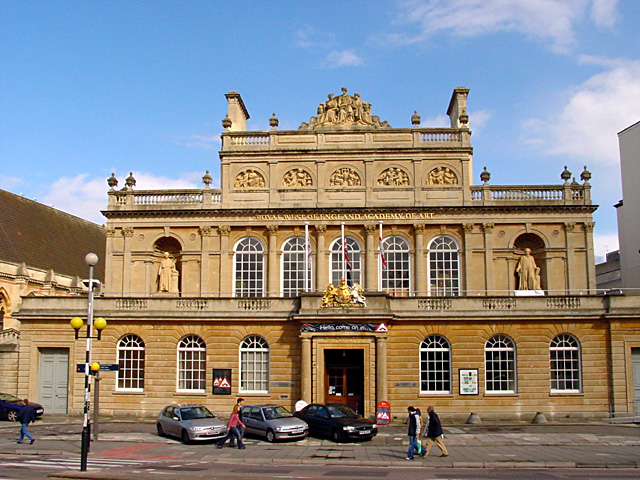
- Front view, April 2006

- Location within Bristol
- Established: 1844; 182 years ago
- Location: Queen's Road, Clifton, Bristol, England
- Coordinates: 51.45810°N 2.60840°W
- Director: Ren Renwick
- President: Hamish Young PRWA
- Website: www.rwa.org.uk

Listed Building – Grade II*
- Official name: Royal West of England Academy
- Designated: 4 March 1977
- Reference no.: 1282156

The Royal West of England Academy (RWA) is Bristol's oldest art gallery, located in Clifton, Bristol, near the junction of Queens Road and Whiteladies Road. Situated in a Grade II* listed building, it hosts five galleries and an exhibition programme of historic and contemporary British art.

Elected Royal West of England Academicians use the post-nominal RWA.

== History ==
The Royal West of England Academy was the first art gallery to be established in Bristol, and is one of the longest-running regional galleries and art schools in the UK. Its foundation was initiated by Ellen Sharples, who secured funding from benefactors including Isambard Kingdom Brunel and Prince Albert, and the building was ultimately financed by a bequest of £2,000 from her will in 1849.

At first, the core of the academy was a group of artists, known as the Bristol Society of Artists, who were mostly landscape painters, including William James Müller, Francis Danby, James Baker Pyne, John Syer, Edward Villiers Rippingille, and John King. In 1844 when the Bristol Academy for the Promotion of Fine Arts was founded, the Bristol Society of Artists was incorporated into it. At this time the president and committee was predominantly its patrons, rather than its artists. In 1913 King George V granted the academy its Royal title, with the reigning monarch as its patron, and by 1914 a major extension to the front of the building, including the dome and Walter Crane lunettes, was completed.

During World War II the academy building was taken over by various organisations including the Bristol Aeroplane Company and the U.S. Army. Immediately after the war ended the council applied for the release of the galleries but was informed that they would be occupied by the Inland Revenue until further notice. It was not until 1950 that the building was returned to its original function, after the intervention of the prime minister, Clement Attlee. During the 1950s, the Royal West of England Academy Schools became the West of England College of Art. This moved to the Bower Ashton campus in 1966, where it was then absorbed by the University of the West of England (School of Visual Studies), now the Department of Creative Industries, UWE, Bristol. Part of the original space in the Victoria Rooms was in use for part of art provision at South Gloucestershire and Stroud College in 2025.

The president is the artist Hamish Young PRWA and the director (chief executive) is Ren Renwick.

== Collections ==
Among the paintings in the private collection are works by artists from the Newlyn, St Ives and Bloomsbury Schools and paintings by Elizabeth Blackadder, Bernard Dunstan, Mary Fedden, David Inshaw, Derek Balmer, Anne Redpath and Carel Weight.

== Building ==
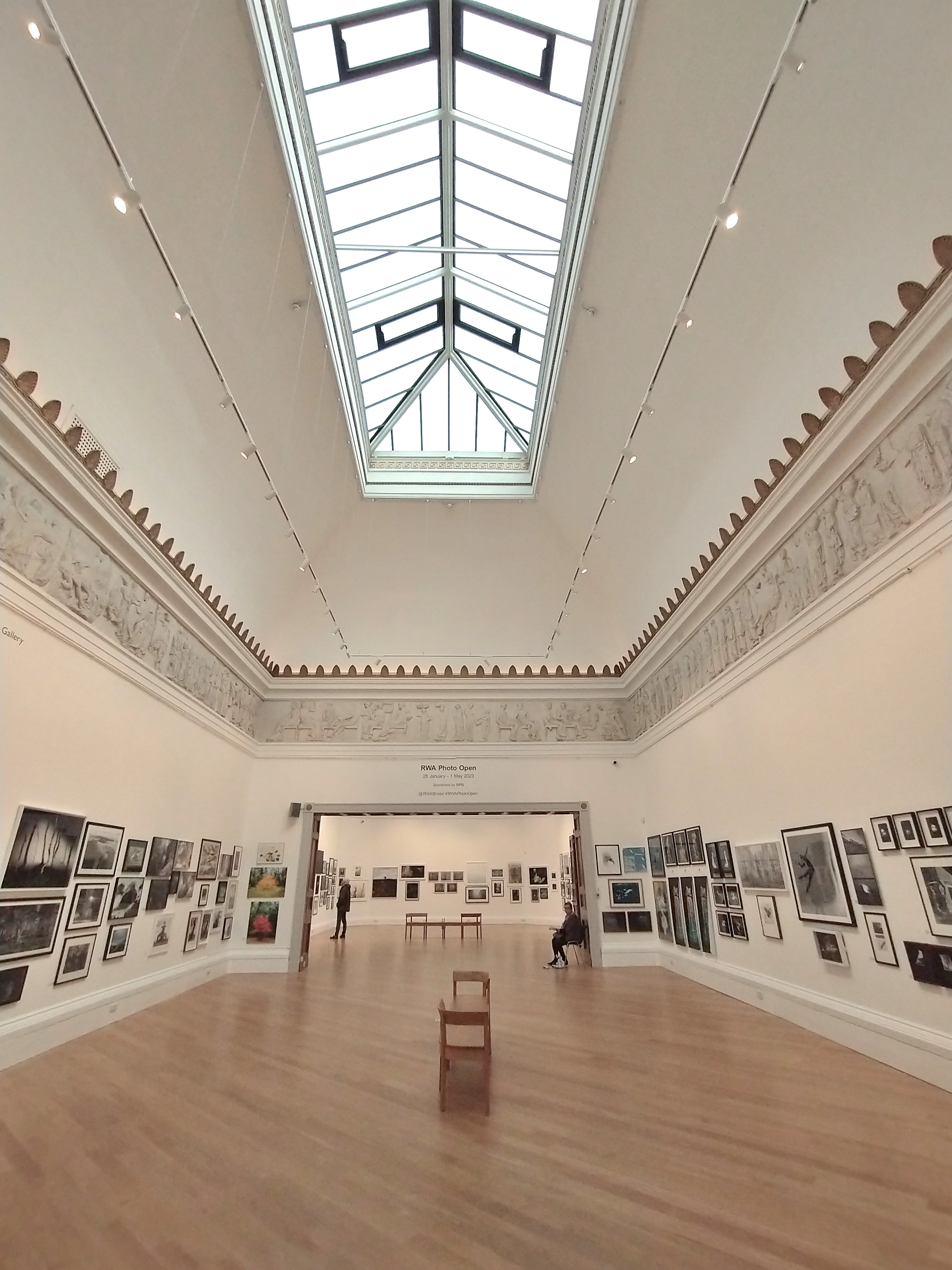
Sharples Gallery

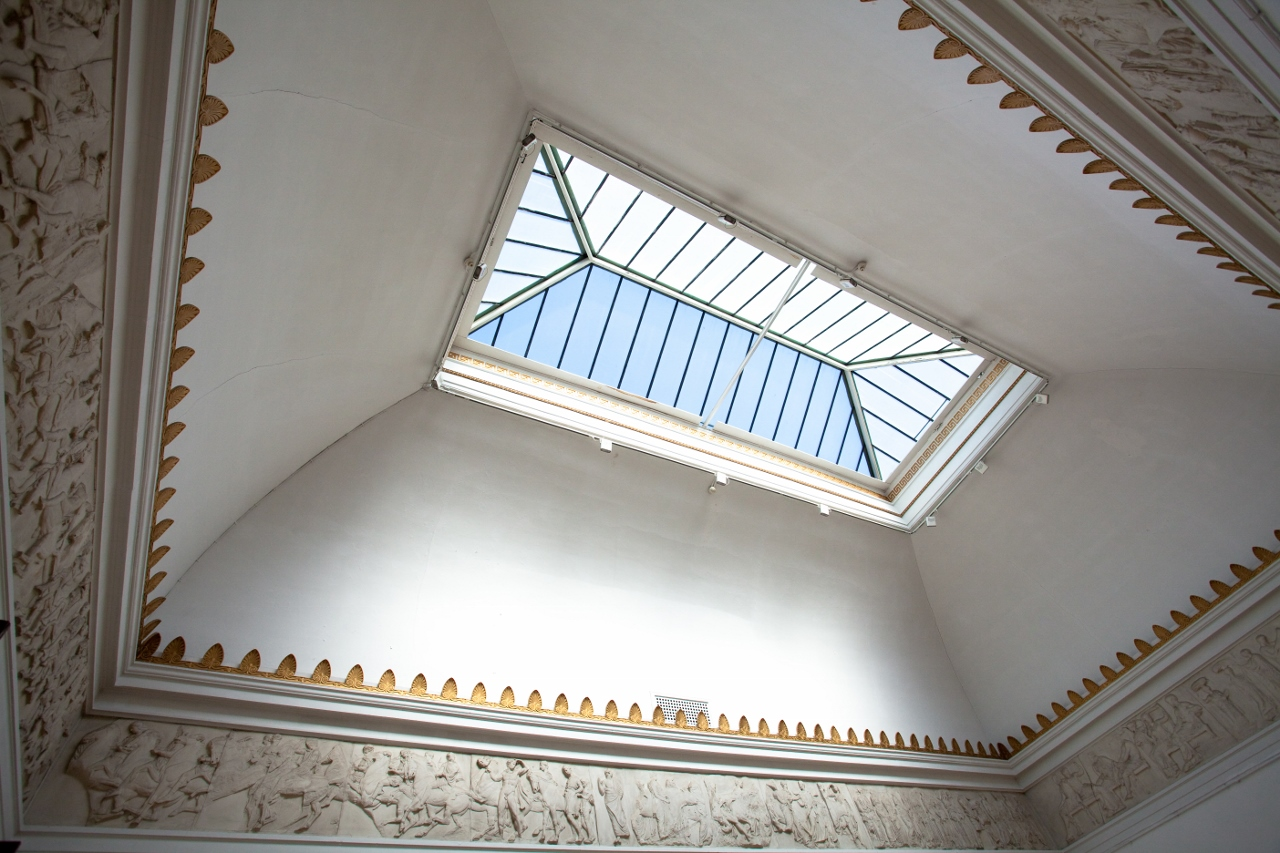
Marble Gallery friezes

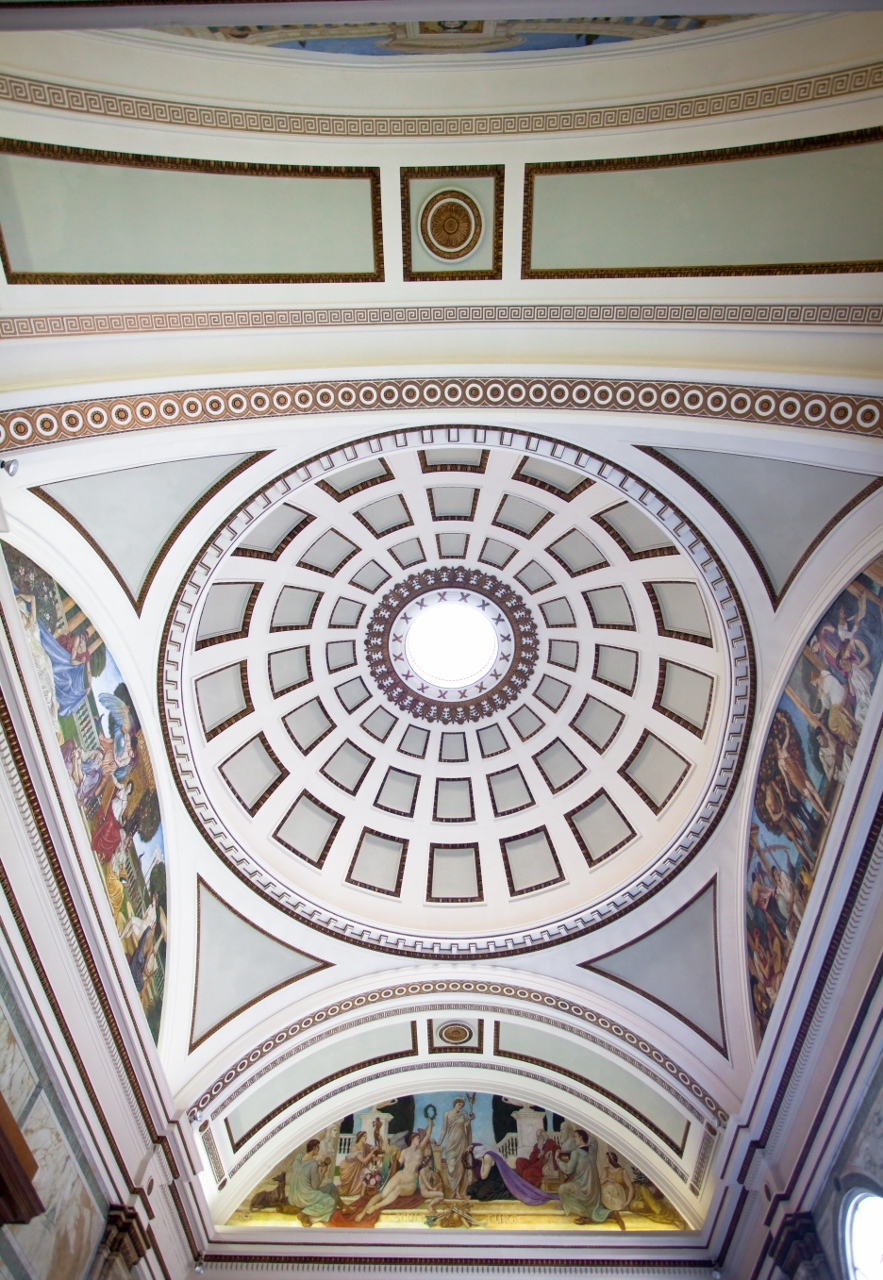
Walter Crane lunettes

The building is Grade II* listed and was constructed in 1857 as the city's first public art gallery, also encompassing an art school. It opened in 1858. The interiors are by Charles Underwood and facade by JR Hirst, altered in 1912 by SS Reay and H Dare Bryan. The first floor is in three sections, the outer ones articulated by paired Corinthian pilasters flanking large shell head niches with statues of Flaxman and Reynolds. A large carving of three female figures - the three graces - crowns the parapet. The interior includes coloured marble and a replica of the Parthenon Frieze.

== Membership ==
As a Royal Academy of Art, the RWA is governed by professional artists, with a membership of around 150 Academicians who are elected by their peers.

=== Types of membership ===
Memberships of the Royal West of England Academy
Post-nominal	Membership type	Abbreviation	Maximum no. allowed
RWA	Royal West of England Academician	RWA Academician	150
PRWA	President of the Royal West of England Academy	President of the RWA	1
PPRWA	Past President of the Royal West of England Academy	Past President of the RWA	
VPRWA	Vice-President of the Royal West of England Academy	Vice-President of the RWA	1
HonRWA	Honorary Royal West of England Academician	Honorary RWA Academician	

=== Presidents ===
Presidents of the Royal West of England Academy
President	Served
John Scandrett Heath (1785–1866)	1844–1859
Philip William Skinner Miles (1816–1881)	1859–1881
Samuel Lang	1881–1884
Col. Henry Bolognier Osborne James Savile (1819–1917) (Sheriff of Bristol 1883)	1884–1887
Daniel H Cave	1887–1897
Alderman Francis James Fry (1835–1918) (Sheriff of Bristol 1886)	1897–1898
William Wills, 1st Baron Winterstoke (1830–1911)	1898–1911
Janet Stancomb-Wills (1854–1932)	1911–1932
Yda Richardson	1932–1936
Paul Ayshford Methuen, 4th Baron Methuen (1886–1974)	1936–1971
Donald Ewart Milner (1898–1993)	1971–1974
Bernard Dunstan (1920–2017)	1974–1984
Mary Fedden (1915–2012)	1984–1989
Leonard Manasseh (1916–2017)	1989–1995
Peter Thursby (1930–2011)	1995–2000
Derek Balmer (b. 1934)	2000–2010
Simon Quadrat (b. 1946)	2010–2011
Janette Kerr (b. 1959)	2011–2016
Stewart Geddes (b. 1961)	2016–2019
Fiona Robinson (b. 1949)	2019–2025
Hamish Young (b. 1972)	2025–present

== See also ==
- Grade II* listed buildings in Bristol
