= Martha Turner =

Australian Unitarian minister (1839–1915)

Reverend Martha Turner

Personal life
- Born: 1839 London, England
- Died: 11 August 1915 (aged 75–76) St. Kilda, Melbourne, Australia
- Known for: First woman to be a Christian minister in Australia

Religious life
- Religion: Unitarianism

Martha Turner (1839–1915), known by her married name as Martha Webster, was an English-born Australian Unitarian minister, and the first woman to work as a Christian minister in Australia. She was a suffragist, and a founding member of the Victorian Women's Suffrage Society. She also was concerned with improving public health, and founded the Australian Health Society in 1875.

== Early life ==
Eliza Martha Turner was born in 1839 to William and Caroline (née Gyles) Turner, in London, England. Her father was a tailor. Turner spent three years of high school in Dijon, France, where she studied French literature. By 1849, William Turner had spent his wife's inheritance, which set the family's fortune aback.

== Life and work in Australia ==
Turner's older brother, Henry Gyles Turner (1831–1920), emigrated to Australia in 1854. A banker by profession, he settled in Melbourne and by 1864, was working as the chief accountant in the Bank of Australasia. In 1870, Martha Turner travelled to Australia to visit her brother, arriving in Melbourne on 11 October. She decided not to return to England, and settled in the Melbourne area, where she socialized with her brother, his wife Helen (née Ramsay), and their friends and associates.

She also joined the Melbourne Unitarian Church, where her brother was a member and a lay preacher. Turner herself began assisting as a lay preacher. In 1873, the congregation elected her to be their "regular minister". She was officially installed as the minister on 23 November 1873, becoming the first woman in Australia to pastor a church.

Turner founded the Australian Health Society in 1875, an association dedicated to educating the public about hygiene and the prevention of disease. At the time, the medical community was just beginning to establish the link between germs and the spread of disease. Because of poor sanitation, outbreaks of infectious diseases like measles and diphtheria were common. Sanitary associations were established in various parts of Australia to educate the public about the benefits of practices like hand washing and proper handling of food. Efforts also were made to add health and hygiene as a subject of study in public schools. Turner was supported in her efforts to promote hygiene and public health by James Jamieson, who was a founding member of the Australian Health Society. An influential physician and health officer, Jamieson was a vocal proponent of "germ theory". The society offered lectures to the general public, and produced pamphlets for distribution to the public.

In 1876, Turner's mother died. In August 1878, Turner married John Webster, a banker, at the Melbourne registry office. At the time, it was usual for women not to work once married, so Turner offered to resign. The congregation asked her to continue, and she served another two years while arrangements were made for a new minister to come from England. A new pastor, W. E. Mellone, arrived in 1880, however he left the position after only three months, and Turner once again became the church's minister.

She retired in 1883. After her retirement, she and her husband travelled to England, where she visited several Unitarian churches.

A supporter of women's suffrage, she attended the inaugural meeting of the Victorian Women's Suffrage Society in May 1884. She also joined the Australian Women's Suffrage Society.

== Death ==
She died on 11 August 1915, in St. Kilda, Melbourne and was cremated.

== See also ==
- Ordination of women
- Women's suffrage in Australia
- Health care in Australia
