= Women's suffrage in Australia =

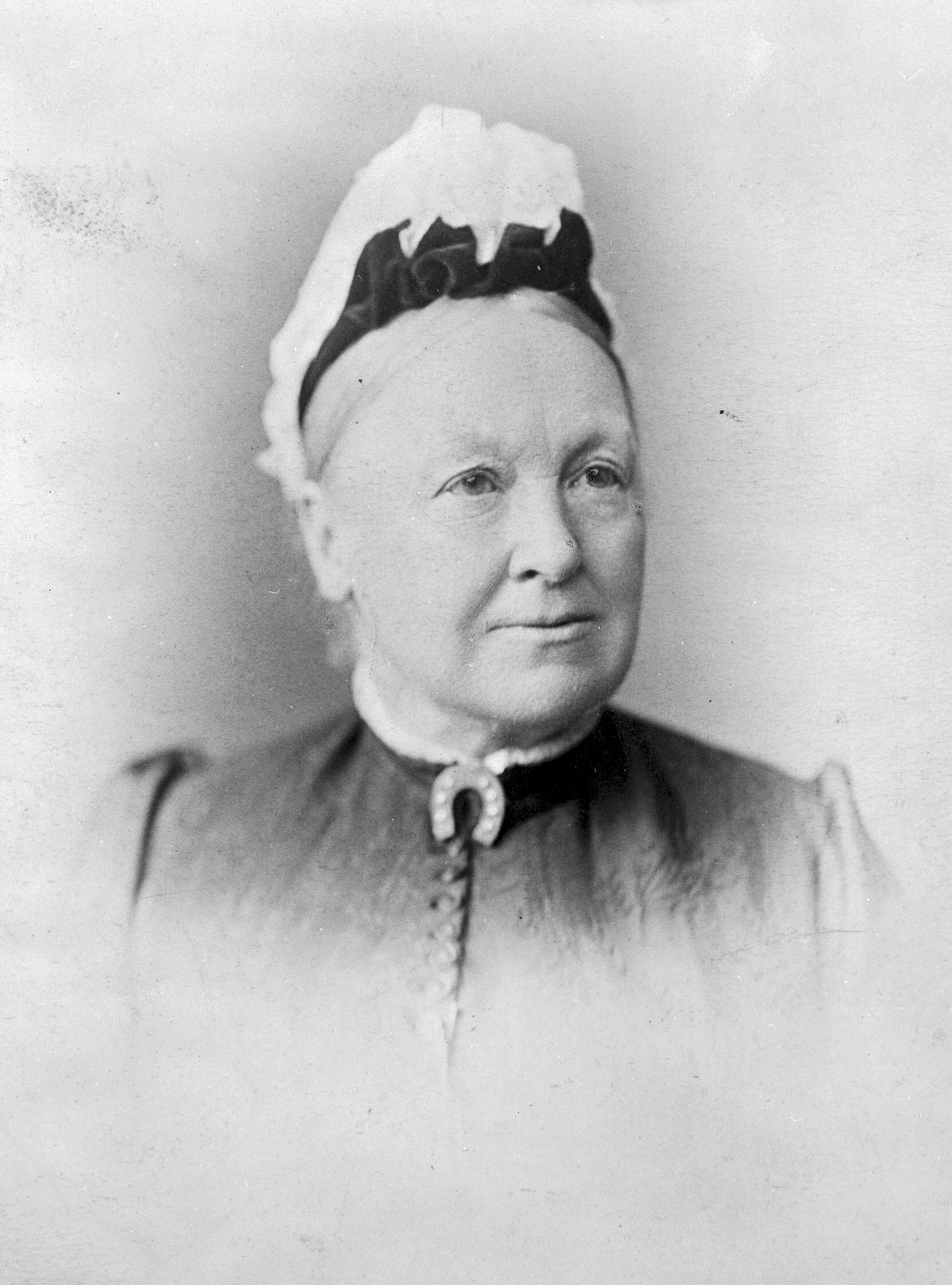
Australia's first female political candidate, South Australian suffragette Catherine Helen Spence (1825–1910). South Australian women won the parliamentary vote in 1894 and Spence stood for office in 1897.

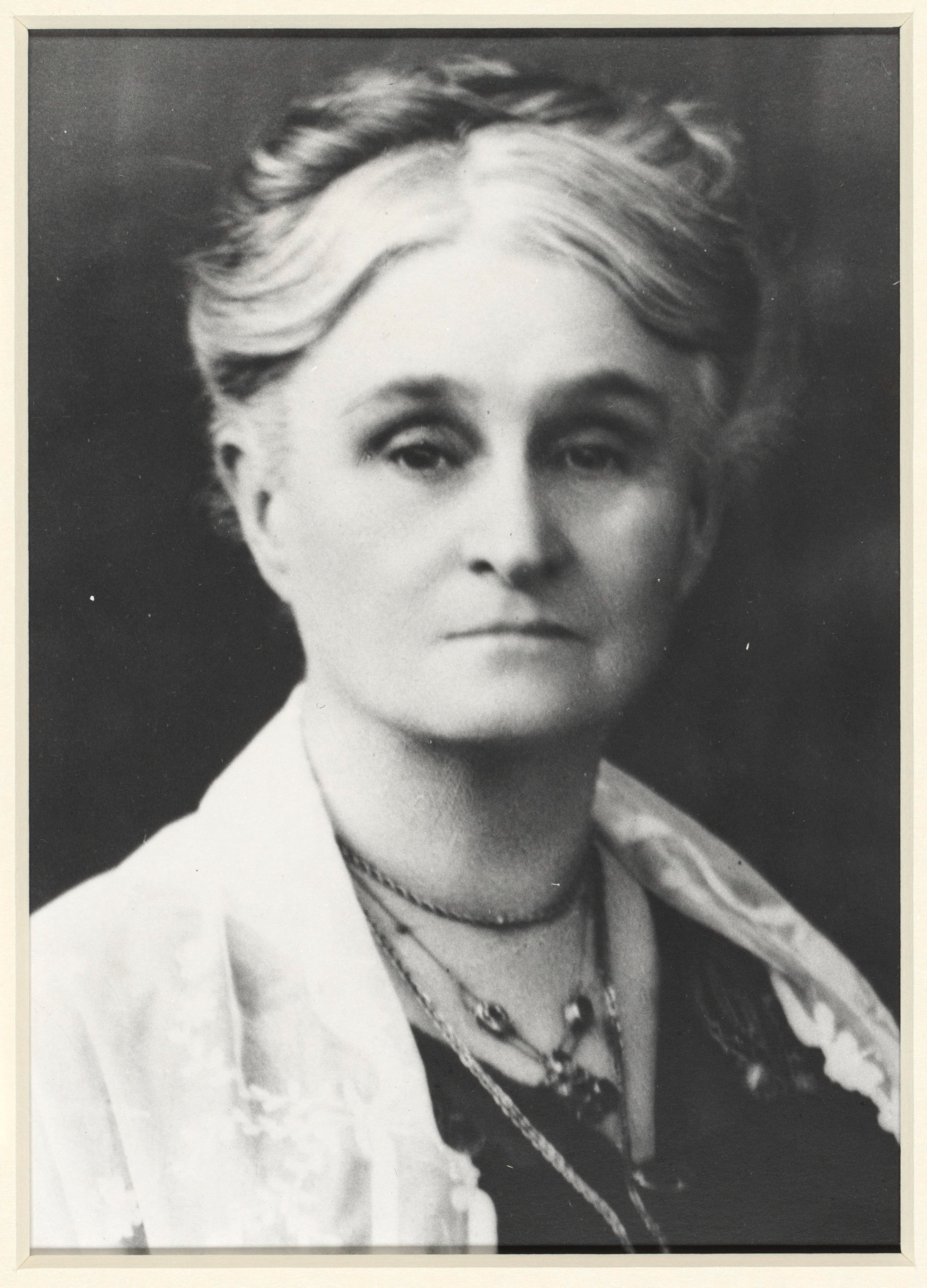
Edith Cowan (1861–1932) was elected to the Western Australian Legislative Assembly in 1921 and was the first woman elected to any Australian Parliament.

Women's suffrage in Australia was one of the early achievements of Australian democracy. Following the progressive establishment of male suffrage in the Australian colonies from the 1840s to the 1890s, an organised push for women's enfranchisement gathered momentum from the 1880s, and began to be legislated from the 1890s. South Australian women achieved the right to vote and to stand for office in 1895, following the Constitutional Amendment (Adult Suffrage) Act 1894 which gained royal assent the following year. Western Australia granted women the right to vote from 1899, although with racial restrictions. In 1902, the newly established Australian Parliament passed the Commonwealth Franchise Act 1902, which gave women equal voting rights to men and the right to stand for federal parliament (although excluding almost all non-white people of both sexes). By 1908, the remaining Australian states had legislated for women's suffrage for state elections. Grace Benny was elected as the first female local government councilor in 1919, Edith Cowan the first state Parliamentarian in 1921, Dorothy Tangney the first Senator and Enid Lyons the first Member of the House of Representatives in 1943.

== History ==
=== Male suffrage ===
The first European-style governments established after 1788 were autocratic and run by appointed governors – although English law was transplanted into the Australian colonies by virtue of the doctrine of reception, thus notions of the rights and processes established by Magna Carta and the Bill of Rights 1689 were brought from Britain by the colonists. Agitation for representative government began soon after the settlement of the colonies.

The oldest legislative body in Australia, the New South Wales Legislative Council, was created in 1825 as an appointed body to advise the Governor of New South Wales. In 1840 the Adelaide City Council and the Sydney City Council were established with limited male suffrage. Australia's first parliamentary elections were conducted for the New South Wales Legislative Council in 1843, again with voting rights (for males only) tied to property ownership or financial capacity. Voter rights were extended further in New South Wales in 1850 and elections for legislative councils were held in the colonies of Victoria, South Australia, and Tasmania.

By the mid-19th century, there was a strong desire for representative and responsible government in the colonies of Australia, fed by the democratic spirit of the goldfields evident at the Eureka Stockade and the ideas of the great reform movements sweeping Europe, the United States and the British Empire, such as Chartism. The Australian Colonies Government Act, passed in 1850, was a landmark development that granted representative constitutions to New South Wales, Victoria, South Australia, and Tasmania and the colonies enthusiastically set about writing constitutions which produced democratically progressive parliaments – through the constitutions generally maintained the role of the colonial upper houses as representative of social and economic "interests" and all established Constitutional Monarchies with the British monarch as the symbolic head of state. 1855 also saw the granting of the right to vote to all male British subjects 21 years or over in South Australia. This right was extended to Victoria in 1857 and New South Wales the following year. The other colonies followed until, in 1900, Tasmania became the last colony to grant universal male suffrage.

=== Women's suffrage movement ===
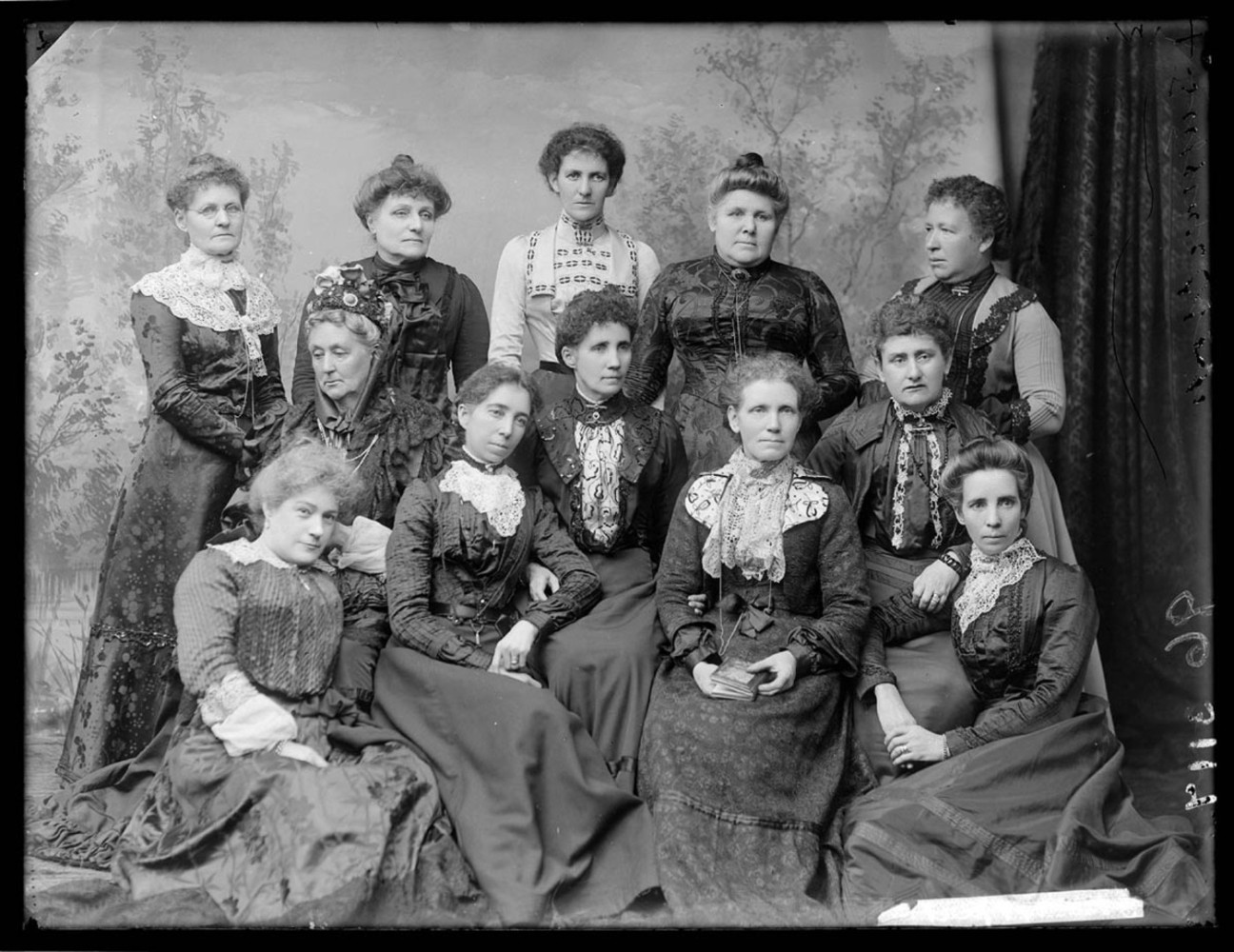
Womanhood Suffrage League of New South Wales, 1902

A movement for women's suffrage gathered pace during the 19th century. The experience and organisations involved in the suffrage movement varied across the colonies.

==== South Australia ====
Propertied women in the colony of South Australia were granted the vote in local elections (but not parliamentary elections) in 1861. The Parliament of South Australia endorsed the right to vote and stand for parliament in 1894 and the law received royal assent in 1895. (Note: South Australia celebrated the centenary of the female franchise in 1994; that is, 100 years from the date the legislation was passed by parliament rather that from the date it gained royal assent.) The law applied equally in the Northern Territory, which was then a part of South Australia.

While the law was being debated, opponents of female suffrage amended the bill to allow women to also be elected to parliament, expecting that this would lead to the defeat of the entire bill. However, the amended bill was passed, giving women the right to hold legislative office when it granted them the right to vote.

In 1897, Catherine Helen Spence became the first female political candidate for political office, unsuccessfully standing for election in South Australia as a delegate to Federal Convention on Australian Federation, which was held in Adelaide. However the first woman would not be elected to the South Australia Council or Assembly until 1959. The first women candidates for the South Australia Assembly ran in the 1918 general election, in Adelaide and Sturt.

==== Western Australia ====
Western Australia granted voting rights to white British women in 1900, in time for women in the colony state voting in the first federal election. The Constitution Act Amendment Act of 1893 had retained a property qualification for "Aboriginal natives of Australia, Asia or Africa" and people of mixed descent. The property qualification (ownership of land that was valued at least £100) excluded virtually all such persons from the franchise.

==== Victoria ====
In Victoria, one of the first known women to vote was London-born businesswoman Mrs Fanny Finch, on 22 January 1856 in the gold rush town of Castlemaine. The first group of women are included in Helen Harris's “The Right to stand, the right to vote”. The Electoral Act 1863 enfranchised all ratepayers listed on local municipal rolls. Some women ratepayers in Victoria were able to vote at the 1864 colony election. However, the all-male legislature regarded this as a legislative mistake and promptly modified the Act in 1865, in time for the 1866 election, to apply the vote only to male ratepayers. Henrietta Dugdale, who publicly advocated women's suffrage since 1868, and Annie Lowe formed the Victorian Women's Suffrage Society in 1884, the first Australian women's suffrage society. The Society called for votes for women on the same basis as men. It took 19 private members' bills from 1889 before Victorian women gained the vote in 1908, and were able to exercise the vote for the first time at the 1911 state election, the last state to do so. The Victorian Society disbanded in 1908, after women in the state gained the vote.

==== New South Wales ====
In 1889, Rose Scott and Mary Windeyer helped to found the Women's Literary Society in Sydney, which grew into the Womanhood Suffrage League of New South Wales in 1891. Women from the Woman's Christian Temperance Union in New South Wales were also active in suffrage activities. They founded the Franchise League in 1890. Eliza Pottie served as president before the league's disbanding. She later joined the Womanhood Suffrage League.

==== Queensland ====
In Queensland, the Women's Equal Franchise Association was formed in 1894, which collected two petitions in 1894 for women's suffrage. The first petition received 7,781 signatures by women and the second received 3,575 signatures by men. The petitions called for one vote and one vote only, as at that time men with property had plural votes.

A third petition was organised by the Woman's Christian Temperance Movement of Queensland in 1897 and attracted 3,869 signatures by men and women, and called for votes for women on the same basis as men. The Franchise Association disbanded in 1905 after white British women in the state gained the vote. Under the Queensland Elections Act (1885), no "aboriginal native of Australia, Asia, Africa, or the Islands of the Pacific" was entitled to vote.

==== The national suffrage struggle ====
The Womanhood Suffrage League of New South Wales submitted a petition to the Australasian Federal Convention on 23 March 1897 calling for the right of women to vote in New South Wales, Tasmania, Victoria and Western Australia to be enshrined in the constitution.

A unified body, the Australian Women's Suffrage Society was formed in 1889, with the aim of educating women and men about a woman's right to vote and stand for parliament. Key figures in the Australian suffrage movement included: from South Australia Mary Lee and Catherine Helen Spence; in Western Australia Edith Cowan; from New South Wales Maybanke Anderson, Louisa Lawson, Dora Montefiore and Rose Scott; from Tasmania Alicia O'Shea Petersen and Jessie Rooke; from Queensland Emma Miller; and from Victoria Annette Bear-Crawford, Henrietta Dugdale, Vida Goldstein, Alice Henry, Annie Lowe and Mary Colton.

In 1903, the Women's Political Association was formed.

The various suffrage societies collected signatures for monster suffrage petitions to be tabled in Parliament. The results varied. Recently some of these petitions have been transcribed and can be searched digitally.

=== Towards voting rights ===
The first election for the Parliament of the newly formed Commonwealth of Australia in 1901 was based on the electoral laws of the six federating colonies, so that women who had the vote and the right to stand for Parliament at a colony (now state) level (i.e., in South Australia including the Northern Territory and Western Australia) had the same rights for the 1901 Australian federal election. In 1902, the Commonwealth Parliament passed the uniform Commonwealth Franchise Act 1902, which granted women equal voting rights to men at the federal level, albeit subject to racial restrictions. This franchise explicitly excluded women (and men) who were "aboriginal natives" of Australia, Africa, Asia, and the Pacific Islands (except New Zealand), unless they were already enrolled to vote in an Australian state.

In 1949, the Commonwealth Electoral Bill was enacted giving Aboriginal people the right to vote at Commonwealth elections if they were enfranchised under a State law or were a current or former member of the defence forces. The Commonwealth Electoral Act 1961 removed the disqualification on Africans and Pacific Islanders, and the Commonwealth Electoral Act 1962 gave Indigenous Australians the option of enrolling to vote at Commonwealth and Northern Territory elections. The Commonwealth Electoral Amendment Act 1983 introduced compulsory voting for Indigenous Australians as was the case for other Australians.

=== Summary ===
Female suffrage*
	Right to §vote	Right to stand for Parliament
Commonwealth	1901 (South Australia and Western Australia); 1902 (other states)	1902
State
South Australia	1895	1895
Western Australia	1899	1920
New South Wales	1902	1918
Tasmania	1903	1921
Queensland	1905	1915
Victoria	1908	1923
*There were racial restrictions, on the right to vote in Queensland, Western Australia and the Commonwealth

Local government (Councils)	Right to vote (a)	Right to stand	First elected
State
South Australia	1861	1914	1919, Grace Benny
Western Australia	1876	1919	1920, Elizabeth Clapham
Victoria	1903	1914	1920, Mary Rogers
Queensland	1879	1920	1923, Ellen Kent Hughes
City of Brisbane	1924	1924	1949, Petronel White
Tasmania
Rural	1893	1911	1957, Florence Vivien Pendrigh
Hobart City Council	1893	1902	1952, Mabel Miller
Launceston City Council	1894	1945	1950, Dorothy Edwards
New South Wales
Sydney City Council	1900	1918	1965, Joan Mercia Pilone
Municipalities and Shires	1906	1918	1928, Lilian Fowler
(a)The right to vote in local elections was not necessarily universal since there were property ownership restrictions, as well as racial restrictions, on the right to vote in many local jurisdictions.

== See also ==
- Centenary of Women's Suffrage Gazebo
- Feminism in Australia
- History of Australia
- Human rights in Australia
- List of suffragists and suffragettes
- List of Australian suffragists
- List of women's rights activists
- Politics of Australia
- Suffrage in Australia
- Timeline of women's suffrage
- Voting rights of Indigenous Australians
- Women and government in Australia
- Women's history#Australia and New Zealand
