= List of Australian suffragists =

This is a list of Australian suffragists who were born in Australia or whose lives and works are closely associated with that country.

== Suffragists ==
- Louisa Ardill (1853-1920), superintendent of the Australian Commonwealth's Woman's Christian Temperance Union Suffrage and Political department
- Annette Bear-Crawford (1853–1899) – women's suffragist and federationist in Victoria
- Bella Guerin (1858—1923) – – first woman to graduate from an Australian university; women's rights activist, suffragist, anti-conscriptionist, political activist, and schoolteacher
- Belle Theresa Golding (1864–1940) – feminist, suffragist and labor activist
- Catherine Helen Spence (1825–1910) – author, teacher, and journalist; commemorated on a special issue of the Australian five-dollar note
- Dora Meeson Coates (1869–1955) – artist, member of British Artists' Suffrage League
- Euphemia Bridges Bowes (1816–1900) – president of the Woman's Christian Temperance Union from 1885 to 1892.
- Edith Cowan (1861–1932) – politician, social campaigner, first woman elected to an Australian parliament
- Eliza Ashton (1851/1852–1900) – journalist and founding member of the Womanhood Suffrage League of New South Wales
- Elizabeth Brentnall (1830–1909) – Australian suffragist, temperance activist and philanthropist.
- Elizabeth Webb Nicholls (1850–1943) – campaigner for women's suffrage in South Australia
- Emma Miller (1839–1917) – pioneer trade union organiser, co-founder of the Women's Equal Franchise Association
- Evelyn Strang (1867-1954) — President, Australian Woman's Christian Temperance Union; suffragist in Sydney
- Fanny Furner (1864–1938) – activist, first women to stand for election in local government in Manly
- Helen Hart (suffragist) (1839–1908) – British born Australian suffragist and lecturer, who toured Australia and New Zealand giving public lectures on women's rights, temperance, and Christianity.
- Henrietta Dugdale (1827–1918) – initiated the first female suffrage society in Australia
- Isabella Goldstein (1849–1916) – Australian suffragist and social reformer
- Jean Beadle (1868–1942) – suffragist who organised a union of female factory workers
- Jessie Rooke (1845–1906) – Tasmanian suffragist and temperance reformer
- Jessie Street (1889–1970) – feminist, human rights campaigner
- Kate Dwyer (1861–1949) – schoolteacher and Labor leader, member of the Womanhood Suffrage League of New South Wales
- Lilian Locke (1869–1950) – honorary secretary of the United Council for State Suffrage, political organiser, trade unionist and labor activist
- Louisa Lawson (1848–1920) – poet, writer, publisher, and feminist
- Maria Elizabeth Kirk (1855–1928) Temperance in UK and suffrage in Australia.
- Mary Colton (1822–1898) – president of the Women's Suffrage League from 1892 to 1895
- Mary Hynes Swanton (1861–1940) Australian women's rights and trade unionist
- Mary Lee (1821–1909) – suffragist and social reformer in South Australia
- Mary Anne Lockwood (1858–1938) - temperance worker and suffragist in South Australia
- Mary Windeyer (1836–1912) – women's suffrage campaigner in New South Wales
- May Jordan McConnel (1860–1929) – trade unionist and suffragist, member of the Women's Equal Franchise Association
- Maybanke Anderson (1845–1927) – promoter of women's and children's rights, campaigner for women's suffrage and federation
- Muriel Matters (1877–1969) – lecturer, journalist, educator, actress, elocutionist, member of the Women's Freedom League
- Rose Scott (1847–1925) – founder of the Women's Political Education League
- Rosetta Jane Birks (1856–1911) – social reformer, philanthropist and South Australian women's suffragist
- Serena Lake (1842–1902) – South Australian evangelical preacher, social reformer, campaigner for women's suffrage
- Vida Goldstein (1869–1949) – feminist politician, first woman in British Empire to stand for election to a national parliament

== See also ==
- List of suffragists and suffragettes
- Timeline of women's suffrage
- Women's suffrage in Australia
- Suffrage in Australia
