= Women and government in Australia =

Relationship between women and the Australian government

Government in Australia is elected by universal suffrage and Australian women participate in all levels of the government of the nation. In 1902, the newly formed Commonwealth of Australia became the first nation on earth to enact equal suffrage, enabling women to both vote and stand for election alongside men Women have been represented in Australian state parliaments since 1921, and in the Federal Parliament since 1943. The first female leader of an Australian state or territory was elected in 1989, and the first female prime minister took office in 2010. In 2019 for the first time, a majority of members of the Australian Senate were women. At the time of its foundation in 1901, and again from 1952 to 2022, Australia has had a female monarch as ceremonial head of state, while the first female governor of an Australian state was appointed in 1991, and the first female governor-general of Australia took office in 2008.

Prior to the 1901 Federation of Australia, some of the self-governing British colonies of Australia had already enacted the right of women to vote or stand in elections. South Australian women achieved the right to stand for office in 1895 following the Constitutional Amendment (Adult Suffrage) Act 1894, which was the first legislation in the world to permit women to stand for election for political office. In 1897, Catherine Helen Spence became the first female political candidate for political office, unsuccessfully standing as a delegate to the Federal Convention on Australian Federation. Women won the vote in Western Australia in 1900, with some restrictions based on race. Indigenous Australian women could vote in some jurisdictions and circumstances from the outset, but did not achieve unqualified suffrage in all states and territories until 1962. Following Federation in 1901, the newly formed Parliament of Australia passed the Commonwealth Franchise Act 1902 allowing most women to both vote and stand at the 1903 Federal election. The states of New South Wales, Tasmania, Queensland and Victoria passed legislation allowing women to participate in government at the state and local levels soon after Federation. The first woman to be elected to any Australian parliament was Edith Cowan in 1921 (WA), but it was not until the 1943 election that Enid Lyons and Senator Dorothy Tangney became the first women to be elected to the Federal Parliament.

The first female to lead a state or territory government was Rosemary Follett serving in 1989 and again between 1991 and 1995 as chief minister of the ACT. The first female premier was Carmen Lawrence, leading Western Australia for three years until 1993. Joan Kirner was the first female premier of Victoria, serving from 1990 to 1992. In the Northern Territory, Clare Martin became the first female chief minister in 2001 winning from opposition and was reelected in 2005 with an increased majority. In 2007, Anna Bligh became the first female premier in Queensland after the retirement of Peter Beattie, and in 2009, Bligh became the first popularly elected woman premier. In NSW, Kristina Keneally became the first female premier of the state in 2009 and was defeated at the 2011 state election. Lara Giddings was the first female premier of the state of Tasmania between January 2011 and March 2014. In Queensland, in 2015, Annastacia Palaszczuk became the first woman to be elected premier from opposition and was the first female premier to be elected for a second term after winning the 2017 Queensland state election. Despite being the earliest state to grant voting rights and allow women to stand in parliament since 1895, South Australia has never had a female premier. Julia Gillard was prime minister of Australia from 24 June 2010 to 27 June 2013, the first and only woman to have held the position.

== The Crown ==
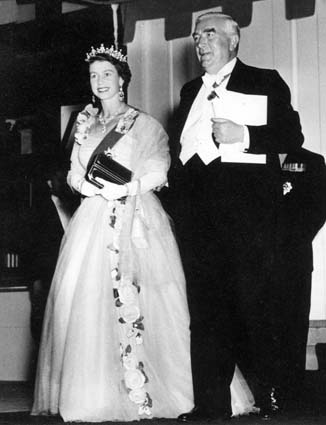
Queen Elizabeth II with her first Australian Prime Minister, Sir Robert Menzies in 1954

Australia has been governed as a Federated Constitutional Monarchy since 1901. There have been two female heads of state in the history of the Monarchy of Australia. Queen Victoria, who reigned from 1837 to 1901, and was the reigning monarch when the Constitution of Australia came into force, on 1 January 1901, after she gave it Royal Assent. Queen Elizabeth II reigned from 1952 to 2022, and from 1973 she was styled "Queen of Australia", to emphasise the separate constitutional status of the Australian Monarchy from the United Kingdom institution. Queen Elizabeth celebrated her 70th jubilee in 2022 – the longest serving monarch in Australian history.

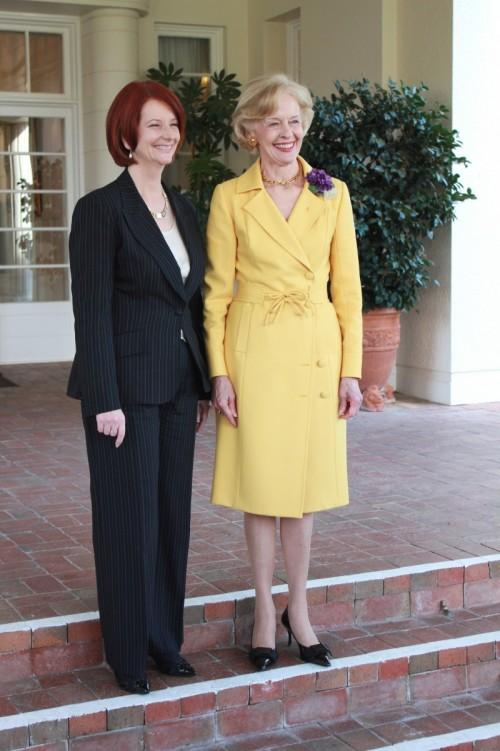
Governor-General Quentin Bryce (right) stands with Prime Minister Julia Gillard – the first women to hold these respective offices in Australian history,

The monarch is represented in Australia by governors at a state level, and by the governor-general at a Federal government level. There have been fifteen female state governors, since 1991 when Dame Roma Mitchell became the 31st governor of South Australia. Dame Quentin Bryce became the first female governor–General in 2008 and served until 2014.

== Women's suffrage ==
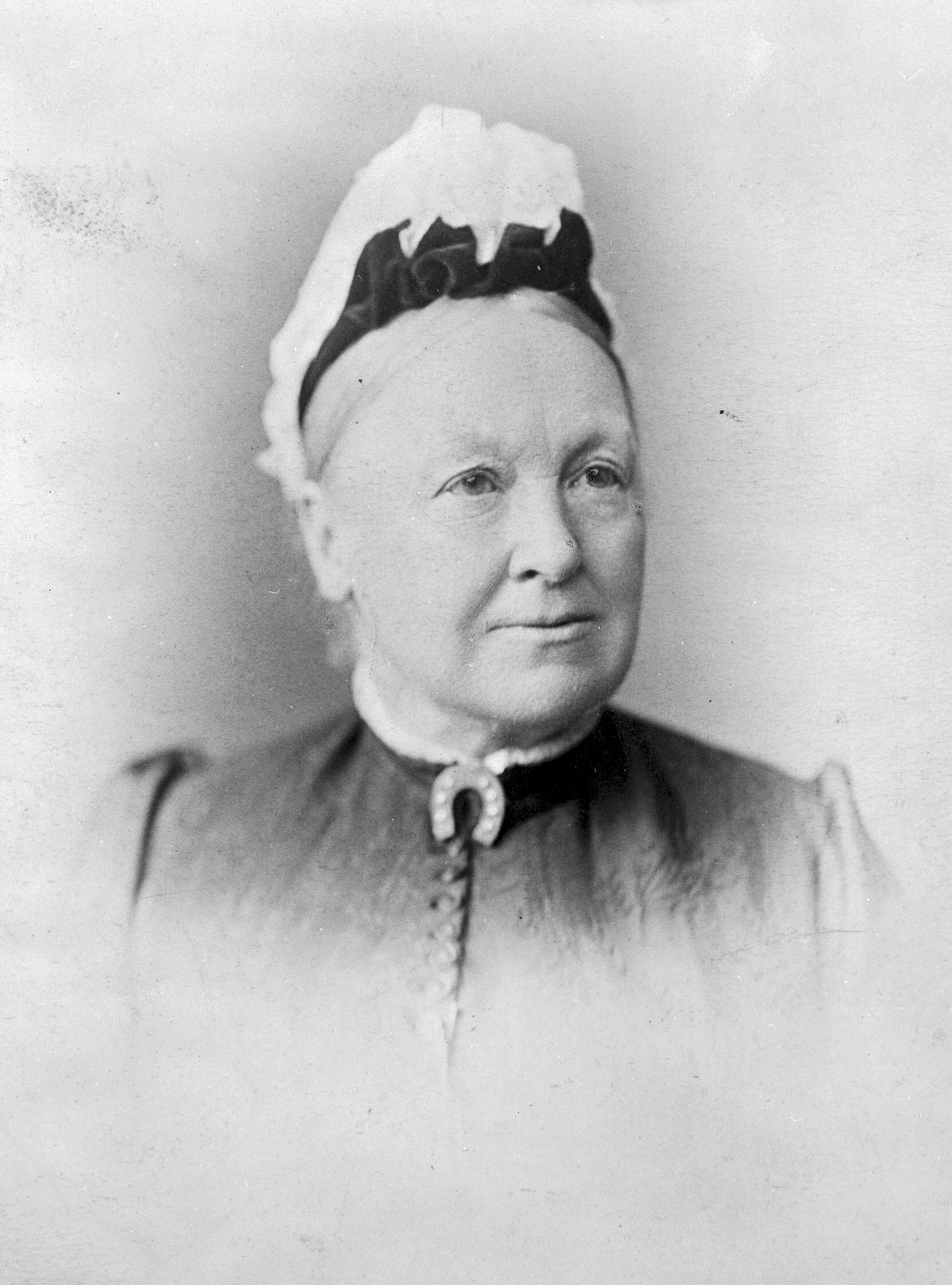
South Australian suffragette Catherine Helen Spence (1825–1910). Australia's first female political candidate.

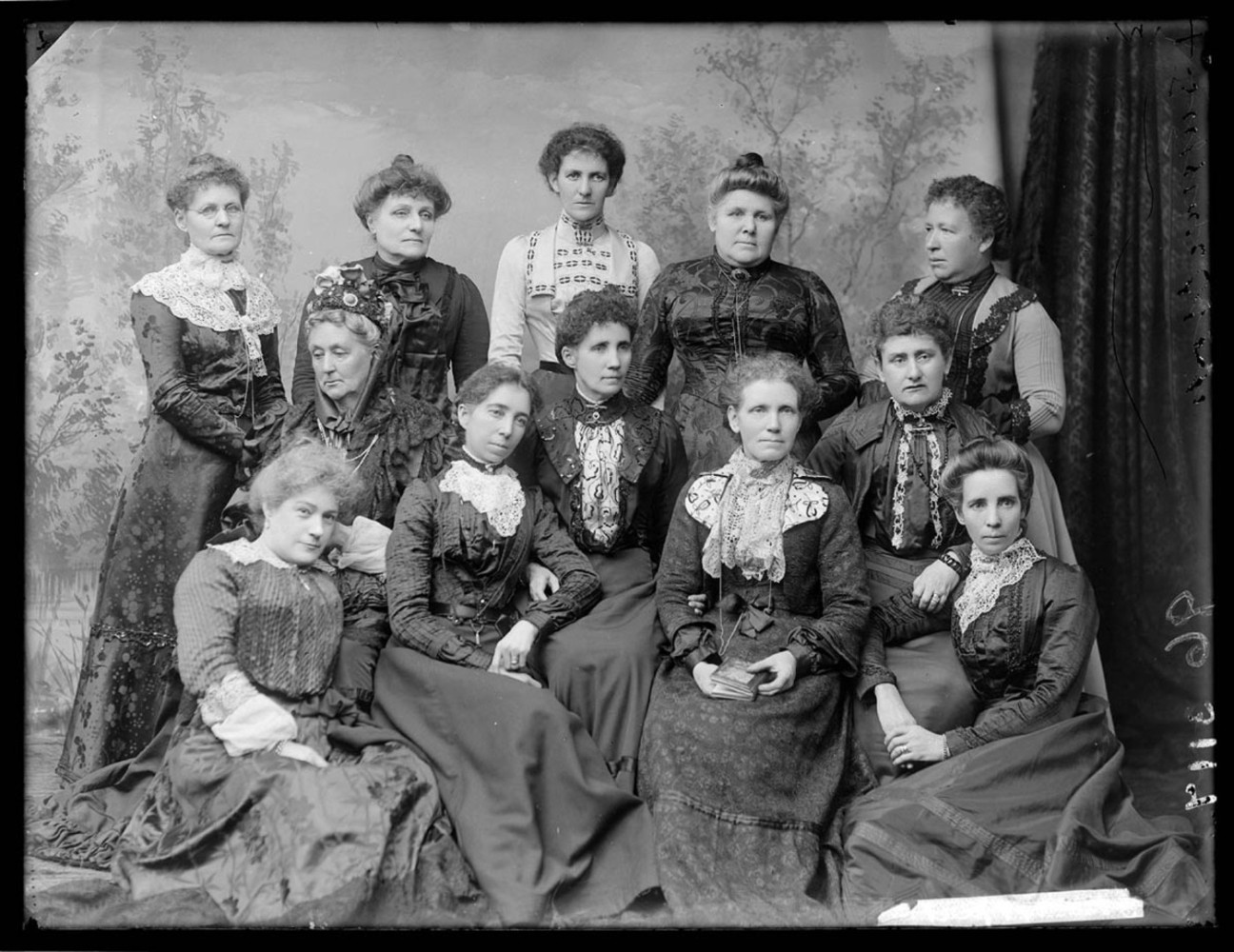
Womanhood Suffrage League of New South Wales, 1902

During the 19th century, Britain's Australasian colonies were at the vanguard of achieving both male and female suffrage. Australia's first council elections were held with male suffrage in 1840, while parliamentary elections were first conducted for the New South Wales Legislative Council in 1843, with voting rights (for males only) tied to property ownership or financial capacity. The Australian Colonies Government Act, passed in 1850, granted representative constitutions to New South Wales, Victoria, South Australia, and Tasmania and the colonies enthusiastically set about writing constitutions which produced democratically progressive parliaments – through the constitutions generally maintained the role of the colonial upper houses as representative of social and economic "interests" and all established Constitutional Monarchies with the British monarch as the symbolic head of state. 1855 also saw the granting of the right to vote to all male British subjects 21 years or over in South Australia. This right was extended to Victoria in 1857 and New South Wales the following year. The other colonies followed until, in 1896, Tasmania became the last colony to grant universal male suffrage.

While the female descendants of the Bounty mutineers who lived on Pitcairn Islands could vote from 1838, and this right transferred with their resettlement to Norfolk Island (now an Australian external territory) in 1856, women in mainland Australia and New Zealand were next in the world to achieve such historic gains. Following the successful establishment of voter rights for males, women's suffrage groups began to organise in Australia from the 1880s. Henrietta Dugdale, Annie Lowe, and Elizabeth Rennick formed the Victorian Women's Suffrage Society, the first suffrage society in Australia in 1884. The organisations involved in the suffrage movement varied across the colonies. A national body, the Australian Women's Suffrage Society, was formed in 1889, whose aims were to educate women and men about a woman's right to vote and stand for parliament. Key figures in the Australian suffrage movement included South Australians Mary Lee and Catherine Helen Spence, Western Australian Edith Cowan, New South Welsh Maybanke Anderson, Louisa Lawson, Dora Montefiore and Rose Scott, Tasmanians Alicia O'Shea Petersen and Jessie Rooke, Queenslander Emma Miller, and Victorians Annette Bear-Crawford, Henrietta Dugdale, Vida Goldstein, Alice Henry and Annie Lowe.

In 1861 land-owning South Australian women had a vote in local elections. In 1894, the Constitutional Amendment (Adult Suffrage) Act 1894 in South Australia followed New Zealand in extending the franchise to women voters – but went further than New Zealand and allowed women to stand for the colonial Parliament. South Australian women voted for the first time at the 1896 South Australian election. In 1897 Catherine Helen Spence became the first woman political candidate when she ran for election to the National Australasian Convention as one of ten delegates, but came 22nd out of 33 candidates. In 1899 Western Australian women achieved voting rights for colonial elections but not the right to stand for the colonial Parliament. Women from both South Australia and Western Australia voted at the 1901 election.

On 12 June 1902 the Commonwealth Franchise Act came into effect, granting most Australian women the right to vote and stand in Commonwealth elections. Franchise of Indigenous Australians at the federal level was not universal until 1962, and voting by Indigenous Australians was not compulsory until 1984. The first election at which women used both the right to vote and stand for election was the 1903 election, held on 16 December.

Following the inclusion of non-indigenous women in the 1903 election, many Australian women and the Australian government, led by Prime Minister Alfred Deakin, used their experience to promote women's suffrage in the United Kingdom and elsewhere. 'Trust the Women Mother, As I Have Done', banner painted by Dora Meeson was carried at the head of the Australian and New Zealand Women Voters' Committee contingent in the Women's Suffrage Coronation March in London on 17 June 1911.

New South Wales, Tasmania, Queensland and Victoria followed the lead of the other states in allowing women to vote, and later to stand for election. Victoria, the last state to grant women's suffrage, had briefly allowed women to vote when the Electoral Act 1863 enfranchised all ratepayers listed on local municipal rolls. Women in Victoria voted in the 1864 general election. The legislative mistake was quickly repaired in 1865, and it took 19 private members' bills from 1889 until Victorian women gained the vote in 1908, and were able to exercise the vote in 1911. Women in the Northern Territory and the Australian Capital Territory were, as federal subjects, eligible to vote at the federal level from their establishment. By the time the territories achieved self-government in 1978 and 1989 respectively, they did not need to enact specific legislation to enable the women's vote.

The right to vote in local government elections was granted later in most jurisdictions than it was at the state and federal levels. The right to vote in local elections was also not automatic, as property ownership qualifications limited the eligibility to vote and stand for local elections.

Significantly from 2010 to 2011 the city of Sydney was operating totally under female governance: from the Lord Mayor and State Member for Sydney Clover Moore, to State Premier Kristina Keneally, to State Governor Marie Bashir, to Federal Member for Sydney Tanya Plibersek, to Prime Minister of Australia Julia Gillard, to Governor–General of Australia Quentin Bryce, and of course, to the Australian Head of State, Queen Elizabeth II.

The first women elected to Australian parliaments have generally been members of the non-Labor (i.e., conservative) parties. This was the case in every state except for Tasmania, where an independent, Margaret McIntyre, was the first woman elected to parliament. The Labor Party first began to regularly nominate female candidates to parliament in the 1950s, generally only to the upper houses at first.

Since 2015, 12 Indigenous women have been elected to state, territory or commonwealth parliaments, with 5 of whom having been ministers in a government starting with Marion Scrymgour in 2007.

The introduction of women's political rights in Australia
Parliament	Right to vote (a)	Right to stand
Commonwealth	1902 (b)	1902
State
South Australia	1894	1894
Western Australia	1899	1920
New South Wales	1902	1918
Tasmania	1903	1921
Queensland	1905	1915
Victoria	1908	1923
(a) The dates for the right to vote at State level refer to equal rights for women and men, but not necessarily universal rights; (b) Women in SA and WA were able to vote in the 1901 federal election.

== Women in politics ==
Female participation in political life
Parliament	Right to stand	First elected to lower house	First elected to upper house
Commonwealth	1902	1943, Enid Lyons (UAP)	1943, Dorothy Tangney (ALP)
State
South Australia	1894	1959, Joyce Steele (LCL)	1959, Jessie Cooper (LCL)
Western Australia	1920	1921, Edith Cowan (Nationalist)	1954, Ruby Hutchison (ALP)
New South Wales	1918	1925, Millicent Preston-Stanley (Nationalist)	1952, Gertrude Melville (ALP)
Tasmania	1921	1955, Mabel Miller and Amelia Best (both Liberal)	1948, Margaret McIntyre (independent)
Queensland	1915	1929, Irene Longman (CPNP)	n.a.
Victoria	1923	1933, Millie Peacock (UAP)	1979, Gracia Baylor (Liberal) and Joan Coxsedge (ALP)
Two women, Catherine Green and Ellen Webster, were appointed to the NSW Legislative Council in 1931.

=== Commonwealth government ===
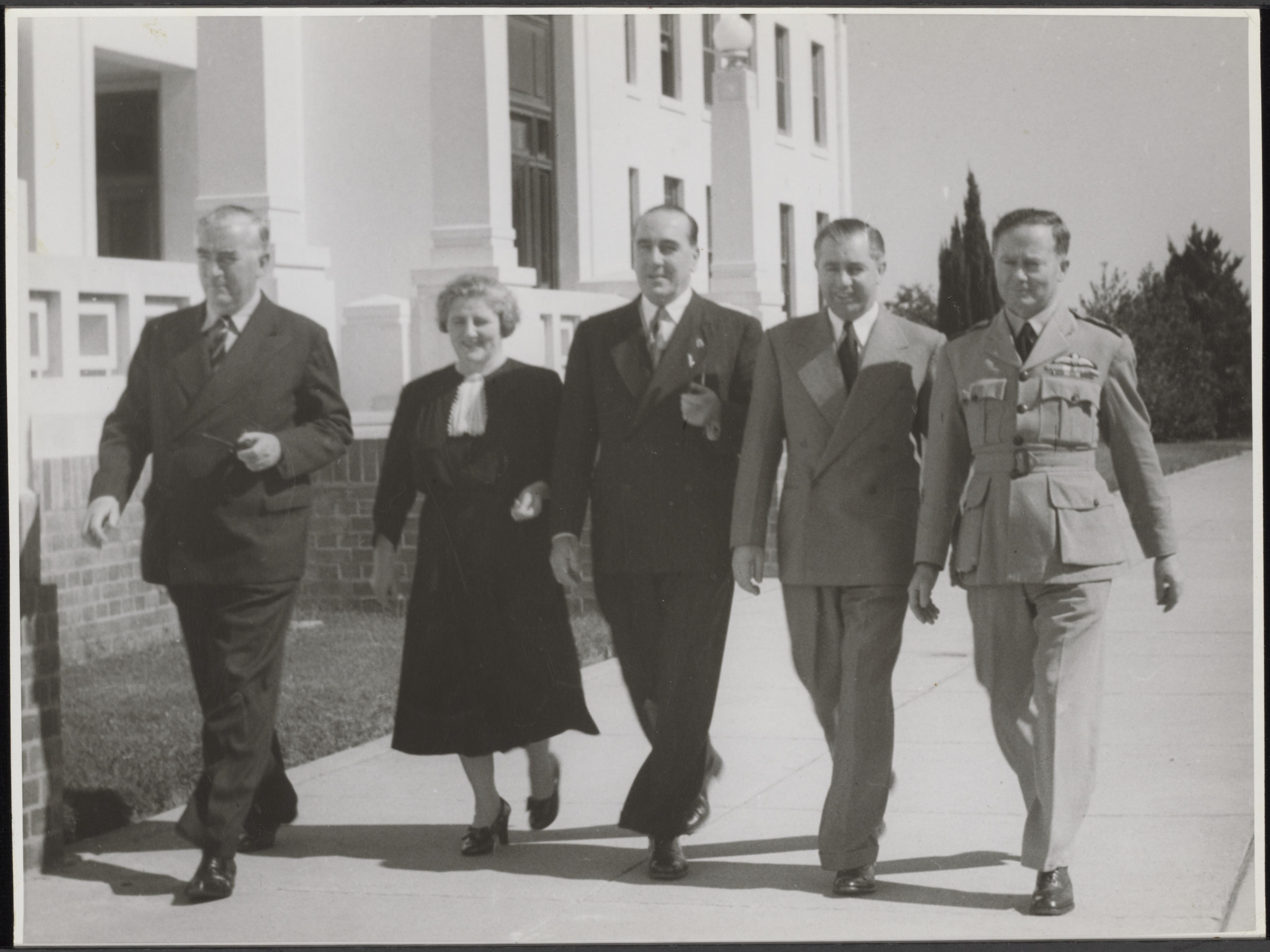
Dame Enid Lyons with other senior figures in the newly created Liberal Party of Australia in 1946. Lyons would later serve as Australia's first female cabinet member in the Menzies government.

Early Parliamentary Candidates

In 1902, Australia became the first nation in the world to introduce equal federal suffrage with the enactment of the Commonwealth Franchise Act 1902, which enabled women to both vote and stand in federal elections. However, it would be four decades before female candidates were elected to serve in the Federal Parliament of Australia. Nevertheless, four women stood for election at the 1903 federal election. They were Mary Moore-Bentley and Nellie Martel from New South Wales, and Vida Goldstein from Victoria, all of whom stood for the Senate, and Selina Anderson who contested the Sydney House of Representatives seat of Dalley. All failed to get major party endorsement and stood as independents, and all were unsuccessful. Goldstein stood for the Senate again in 1910, 1913, 1914 and 1917, all without success. Eva Seery contested Labor Party preselection for the Senate in 1916 but was unsuccessful. She and Henrietta Greville were endorsed Labor candidates at the 1917 federal election, though for safe conservative seats. Though unsuccessful they were the first women to stand for the Australian Parliament with major party endorsement.

First Members, Senators & Ministers

At the 1943 federal election, two women were elected to Parliament - Dame Enid Lyons and Dorothy Tangney. With Australian Labor Party endorsement, Tangney was elected to the Senate representing Western Australia, an office she held until 1968. With the backing of the United Australia Party, Lyons was elected to the House of Representatives as the member for the Division of Darwin, which was located in Tasmania. In 1949 she became the first female member of cabinet, when Liberal prime minister Robert Menzies appointed her Minister without Portfolio to enable her appointment to the honorary office of Vice-President of the Executive Council, an office she held until her retirement from parliament in 1951.

Dame Annabelle Rankin won election for the Liberal Party representing Queensland at the 1946 Election and became Australia's second female senator. She served as Government Whip from 1951 to 1966 in the Menzies government, and was appointed Minister for Housing in the Holt government in 1966, the first woman to head a government department. In 1975, Liberal Senator Dame Margaret Guilfoyle became the first female cabinet minister with a portfolio, following her appointment as Minister for Education in the Fraser government. Agnes Robertson was elected as the fourth female senator in 1949, and was elected as the first Country Party (now National Party) Senator at the 1955 election, after losing endorsement for the Liberals and switching allegiance. She went on to be appointed as the first female member of the Joint Committee on Foreign Affairs in 1956.

Further milestones

In 1983 Labor MP Ros Kelly became the first woman to give birth while an MP. Florence Bjelke-Petersen became Deputy Leader of the National Party in the Senate in 1985 and remained in the role until 1990. In 1986 there were two firsts, Joan Child became the first female Speaker of the House of Representatives and Janine Haines became the first woman to lead a parliamentary party when she became head of the Australian Democrats. Margaret Reid became the first female President of the Senate in 1996. Nova Peris and Jacqui Lambie were the first two indigenous women to enter federal politics in 2014.

Kathy Sullivan was the first woman to have served in both the Senate and the House of Representatives.

First Woman Prime Minister

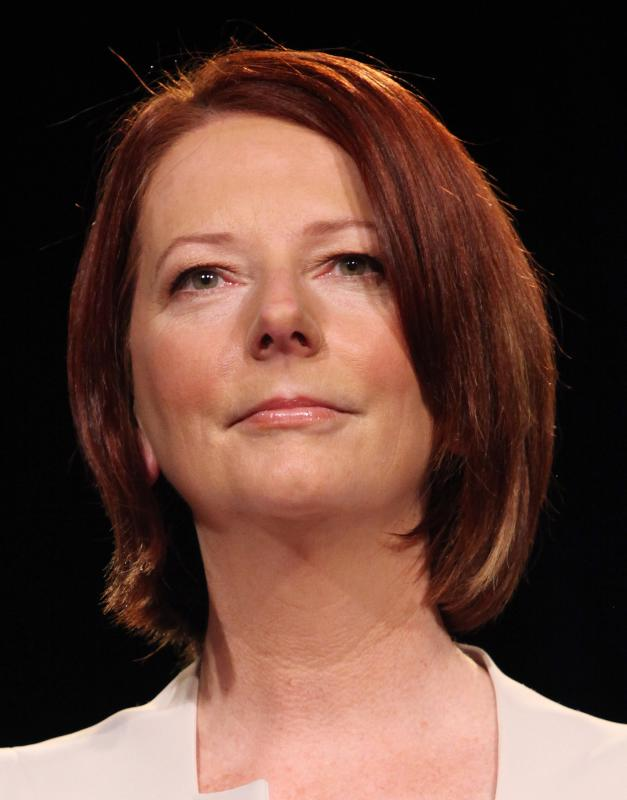
Julia Gillard of the Australian Labor Party is currently the only woman to have served as Prime Minister of Australia.

On 24 June 2010, Julia Gillard became the first woman to lead one of the major political parties at the federal level as Leader of the Australian Labor Party, as well as the first female prime minister of Australia.

Ongoing developments

Julie Bishop had become the first female deputy leader of the Liberal Party in 2007, and with the election of the Abbott government in 2013, became Australia's first female minister for foreign affairs. Bishop was replaced by Senator Marise Payne, who had served as Australia's first female defence minister. All Australian foreign ministers since Bishop have been female. The National Party also had its first female deputy leader over the period in Fiona Nash, who held the position from 2008 to 2017.

In December 2014, Liberal MP Bronwyn Bishop eclipsed Kathy Sullivan's earlier record of 27 years to become the longest-serving female member of the Australian Federal Parliament. She was nominated Speaker of the House of Representatives by Prime Minister Tony Abbott, and served in the role from 2013 to 2015.

Following the 2016 Australian federal election there were 73 women members of both Houses of the Australian Parliament, representing 32% of all seats in the Senate and House of Representatives.

At the 2019 federal election, of the 68 members of the Labor Party in the House of Representatives 28 were women (41.2%). In the Liberal Party, of the 61 members, 13 were women (21.3%). For the Nationals, it had 2 women among 16 members (12.5%). Of the Independents there were 3 women among 6 members (50.0%). Overall, there were 45 women among 151 members (29.8%).

The Liberal–National government's Second Morrison Ministry reached an historic high of seven women in Cabinet, including Foreign Minister Marise Payne, who previously served as Australia's first female defence minister, and became the longest-serving female senator in Australian history, as well as the longest current serving female member of federal parliament in 2022. Following the 2022 Australian federal election, the Albanese Government surpassed the record set by the Morrison government with the appointment of ten women parliamentarians to cabinet. This election also saw a number of female "teal independents" elected to parliament.

==== Commonwealth Public Service ====
The Commonwealth Public Service Act 1902 provided that every female officer was "deemed to have retired from the Commonwealth service upon her marriage", with the exception of women working in agencies transferred from a state to the Commonwealth. The very great majority of women were effectively blocked from non-secretarial positions in the Commonwealth Public Service. In 1949 women were allowed into the clerical division of the service but they remained restricted by the marriage bar. In November 1966, Australia became the last democratic country to lift the legislated marriage bar which had prevented married women from holding permanent positions in the public service.

=== State and territory governments ===
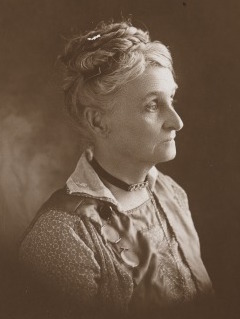
Edith Cowan in 1921, the year she was elected to parliament

The first woman elected to a state parliament was Edith Cowan, when she was elected to the Western Australian Legislative Assembly in 1921. Millicent Preston-Stanley was elected to the New South Wales Legislative Assembly in 1925, Irene Longman was elected to the Legislative Assembly of Queensland in 1929 and Millie Peacock was elected to the Victorian Legislative Assembly in 1933. Ironically, South Australia as the first state to allow women to sit in state parliament, was also the last to have a female sitting member when Joyce Steele and Jessie Cooper were elected on the same day in 1959. Both the Australian Capital Territory Legislative Assembly and Northern Territory Legislative Assembly had women in their inaugural Parliaments. Women were not elected to the upper house of state parliaments until after World War II; no woman was elected to the Victorian upper house until 1979, when Gracia Baylor (Liberal) and Joan Coxsedge (ALP) were elected.

In 1989 Rosemary Follett became the first female head of government in Australia, as Chief Minister of the Australian Capital Territory. Carmen Lawrence was the first female premier of an Australian state when she took the office of Premier of Western Australia in February 1990. She was followed by the appointment of Joan Kirner as Premier of Victoria, in which position she served from 1990 to 1992, when her party was swept from office by Jeff Kennett's conservatives. Clare Martin was Chief Minister of the Northern Territory from 2001 to 2007. Anna Bligh became Premier of Queensland in 2007 when Peter Beattie retired. In 2009, she became the first woman in Australia to be elected Premier, though she subsequently suffered a landslide loss to Campbell Newman's LNP in 2012. On 4 December 2009, Kristina Keneally replaced Nathan Rees to become the first female Premier of New South Wales. As Carmel Tebbutt retained the role of Deputy Premier, Keneally also led the first executive in Australia to be led by two women. However, Keneally would also go on to suffer a crushing defeat at the hands of Barry O'Farrell in 2011. In 2011 Lara Giddings became the first female Premier of Tasmania, serving until 2014 when she likewise suffered a crushing loss to conservative leader Will Hodgman. This again leaves South Australia as the only state or territory not to have had a female head of government. Marion Scrymgour is to date the highest ranked Indigenous woman in a government in Australia when she was Deputy Chief Minister of the Northern Territory from 2007 until 2009.

Prior to Labor's massive loss in 2012 the Legislative Assembly of Queensland had the highest female parliamentary representation in Australia and the third highest in the world, with 30 out of 89 Members having been women. However, the next state election resulted in Annastacia Palaszczuk becoming the first woman to become Premier from opposition. The subsequent government would become the second in Australia to be headed by two women and the first ministry in Australia to have a female majority.

On 3 March 2018, Australia passed another milestone when, at the 2018 Tasmanian election, Tasmanians elected a majority of women to the Tasmanian House of Assembly, with 13 women and 12 men. Seven of the ten Labor members are women, four of the 13 Liberals and both of the Greens.

As at 27 November 2018, following the 2018 Victorian state election, 50% of Ministers in the second Victorian Andrews Government were female, and following cabinet changes on 23 March 2020, a majority of the cabinet was female.

Dame Roma Mitchell was made the first female justice of the Supreme Court of South Australia in 1965, at the recommendation of Don Dunstan, South Australia's 38th attorney-general. She was still the only female judge in South Australia when she retired 18 years later in 1983 although Justices Elizabeth Evatt and Mary Gaudron had been appointed to federal courts by the Whitlam Government. It was not until 1993 that the second woman was appointed to the court, Mitchell's former student, Margaret Nyland.

=== Local government ===
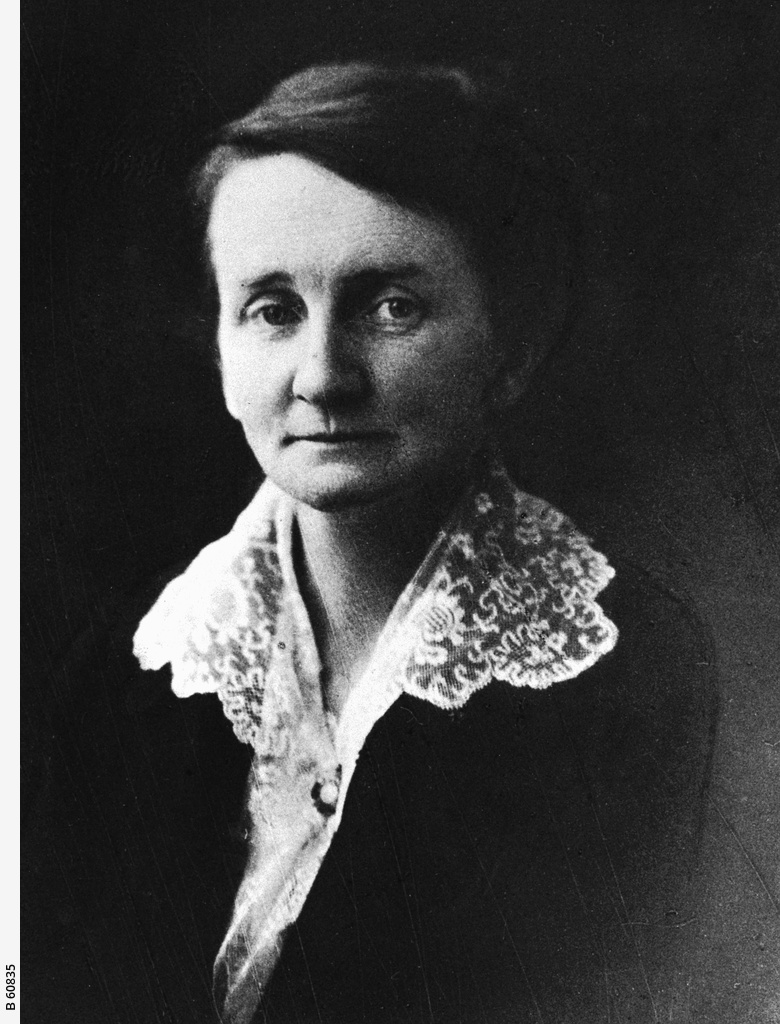
Grace Benny, the first woman elected to a local government authority in Australia.

The first woman elected to a local government authority in Australia was Grace Benny, who was elected to the Brighton Council in South Australia in 1919. In 1920 Mary Rogers was elected to Richmond City Council, Victoria and Elizabeth Clapham was elected to Western Australia's Cottesloe Municipal Council. Queensland's first female councillor was Dr Ellen Kent-Hughes, elected to Kingaroy Shire Council in 1923. New South Wales' first female alderman was Lilian Fowler, elected in 1928 to Newtown Municipal Council; she was later to become Australia's first woman mayor. Gladys Boniwell was Tasmania's first female alderman, elected to Glenorchy City Council in 1947. Dorothy Edwards was elected to Launceston City Council in 1949 and became the first female mayor of an Australian city in 1955. Australia's first female lord mayor, Joy Cummings, was elected to Newcastle City Council in 1974.

In 1951 the Australian Local Government Women's Association (ALGWA) was formed. The ALGWA is an association of local government women helping other women to join them.

In 1975 Western Australia and the Northern Territory elected their first women mayors, Councillor Evelyn H. Parker of the City of Subiaco and Dr Ella Stack of the City of Darwin respectively.

In the 1980s women began to hold the position of Lord Mayor in the capital cities for the first time, including:

- Adelaide – Wendy Chapman (1983–1985)
- Brisbane – Sallyanne Atkinson (1985–1991)
- Hobart – Doone Kennedy (1986–1996), Sue Hickey (2014–2018) and Anna Reynolds (2018–present)
- Melbourne – Lecki Ord (1987–1988), Winsome McCaughey (1988–1989) and Sally Capp (2018–2024)
- Sydney – Lucy Turnbull (2003–2004) and Clover Moore (2004–present)
- Perth – Lisa Scaffidi (2007–2018)

Women's participation in local government in Australia
	Right to vote (a)	Right to stand	First elected
State
South Australia	1861	1914	1919, Grace Benny
Western Australia	1876	1919	1920, Elizabeth Clapham
Victoria	1903	1914	1920, Mary Rogers
Queensland	1879	1920	1923, Ellen Kent-Hughes
City of Brisbane	1924	1924	1949, Petronel White
Tasmania
Rural	1893	1911	1957, Florence Vivien Pendrigh
Hobart City Council	1893	1902	1952, Mabel Miller
Launceston City Council	1894	1945	1949, Dorothy Edwards
New South Wales
Sydney City Council	1900	1918	1965, Joan Mercia Pilone
Municipalities and Shires	1906	1918	1928, Lilian Fowler
(a) The right to vote in local elections was not necessarily universal since there were property ownership restrictions on the right to vote in many local jurisdictions.

== Other milestones ==
In 2010, Australia had female leaders occupying every major political office, with Clover Moore as Lord Mayor, Kristina Keneally as Premier of New South Wales, Marie Bashir as Governor of New South Wales, Julia Gillard as prime minister, Quentin Bryce as Governor-General of Australia, and Elizabeth II as Queen of Australia.

As of April 2023: The governor of New South Wales Margaret Beazley, Governor of Queensland Jeannette Young, Governor of South Australia Frances Adamson, Governor of Tasmania Barbara Baker and Governor of Victoria Linda Dessau are women, meaning that out of 6 governors, 5 are women.

== See also ==
- Women in Australia
- Women in the Australian House of Representatives
- Women in the Australian Senate
- 2021 Australian Parliament rape allegations
  - 2021 March 4 Justice
