= Elizabeth Rennick =

British Australian suffragist (1833–1923)

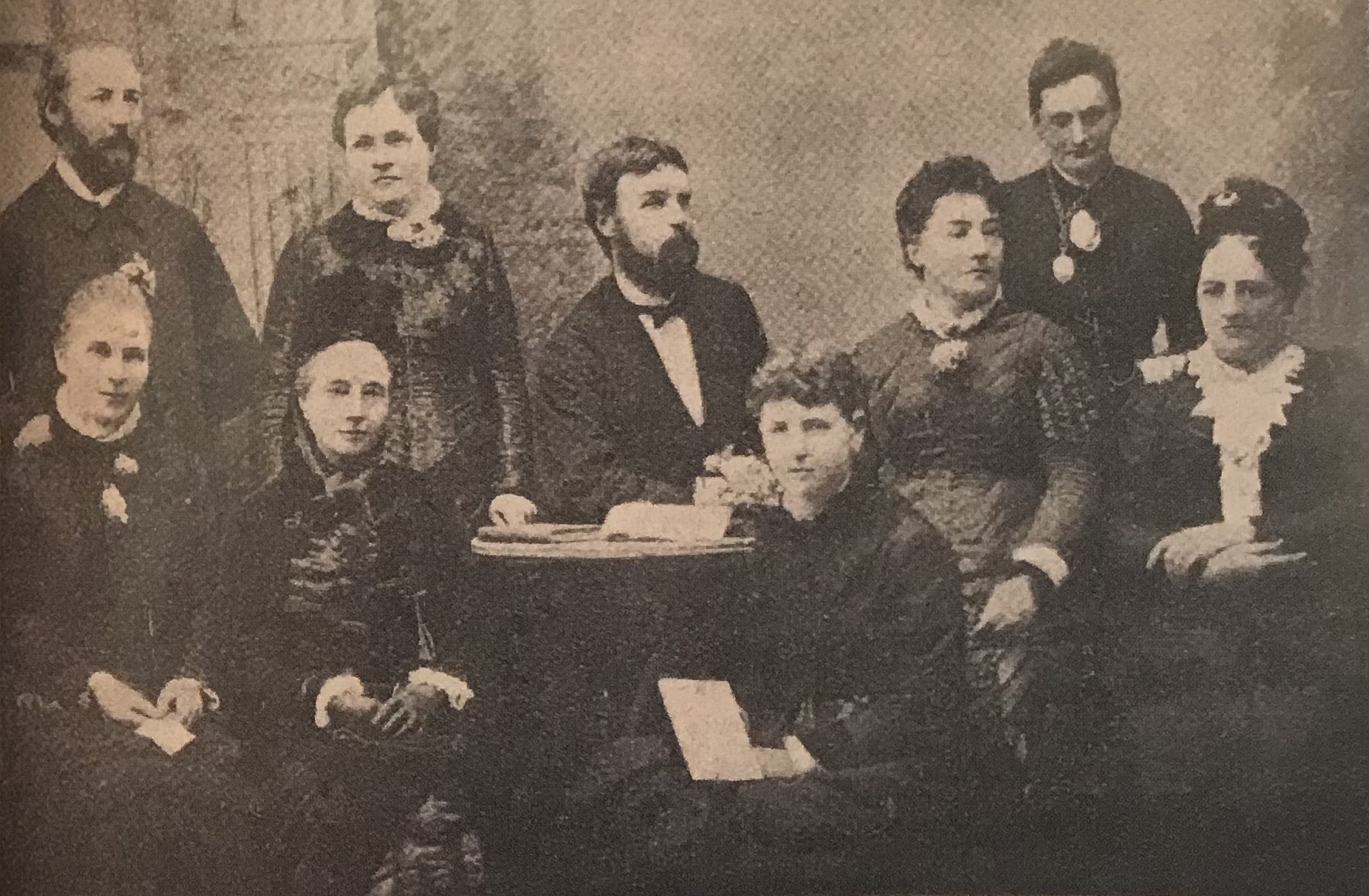
- Elizabeth Rennick c. June 1884
- Born: Elizabeth Harrison Skrymsher c.1833 England
- Died: 12 August 1923 (aged 91); Elsternwick, Victoria, Australia
- Organization: Victorian Women's Suffrage Society
- Title: Co-founder, and inaugural secretary and treasurer
- Term: March 1884 – October 1884
- Movement: Women's suffrage; Malthusianism
- Relatives: James Barrett (son-in-law)

Elizabeth Harrison Rennick (born Elizabeth Harrison Skrymsher, c.1833 – 12 August 1923), was a British born, Australian suffragist who lived in Melbourne, Victoria. She was known as one of the pioneer suffragists in the Colony of Victoria, having hosted the 1884 meeting during which the Victorian Women's Suffrage Society was formed. She was elected its the first secretary and treasurer. She was forced to resign within the first year due to making controversial statements in a press interview.

== Biography ==
=== Early life ===
Rennick was born Elizabeth Harrison Skrymsher, in approximately 1833, in England. She married Charles Rennick in 1857. They had five children, and moved to Australia in 1879. Her daughter Marion was an exhibiting member of the Victorian Artists Society. Marion's second husband was James Barrett.

=== Involvement in the women's suffrage movement ===
While still living in England, Rennick was involved with the women's suffrage movement for many years. She was a member of the Somerville Club, and the National Society for Women's Suffrage.

Later in March of 1884, after she had moved to Australia, Rennick hosted a meeting at her home Ajmere in South Yarra, on Shipley Street, with a group of other suffragists, including Henrietta Dugdale, and Annie Lowe, who wished to make legislative change in Victoria to allow for women's voting rights. This meeting saw the formation of the Victorian Women's Suffrage Society (VWSS), and Rennick was elected as the first secretary and treasurer. She spent the next few months drumming up support for the society, and writing to newspapers. She met with the Premier of Victoria, James Service who told her that women's suffrage was not a 'live question' in the colony.

In October of 1884, Rennick was interviewed by a reporter of The Herald in which she spoke about the VWSS's stance on voting, and refuted the anti-suffrage questions put to her by the reporter. She gave her own opinions on broader women's rights, stating women should be able to run for parliament, sit on juries, and become doctors. She then moved to broader issues, criticising the power of clergyman and religion. She said she believed people with incurable conditions should be euthanised, and that people with certain diseases should not be able to have children. Identifying herself as a Malthusian, she talked of the need of population controls. She also stated that children should receive sexual education from their parents. As well as providing these opinions she also expressed disappointment that only half the VWSS members were women, and stated that they did not work well together. The day after the article was published, Rennick wrote to the editor arguing that the reporter misrepresented the interview. She said she did not initially realise the reporter was on official business, and he sought out her opinions on controversial topics by asking about her time as a member of London societies which were established for the purpose of debating such topics, such as the London Dialectical Society, the Liberal Social, Sunday Social Union, and the Sunday Society. The reporter disputed her claims, stating he clearly communicated his intentions. While some people wrote to the paper in her defence, the committee of the VWSS distanced themselves from her statements. Rennick resigned her position shortly afterwards. At the next fortnightly meeting of the VWSS on 13 October, a resolution of the executive council was carried unanimously to state that they were not bound by the opinions that Rennick had expressed.

Rennick later joined the Australian Women's Suffrage Society, however there is not otherwise much public record of her playing a prominent role in the suffrage movement after leaving the VWSS. She signed the 1891 Victorian Women's Suffrage Petition, listing her Toorak address. In 1905 she spoke at a suffrage event called 'an evening with pioneers', along with others from the original committee of the VWSS.

In 1909, Rennick wrote to the Herald in response to an article that called Annie Lowe the 'Mother of the Suffrage'. The latter article mentioned Rennick and Henrietta Dugdale as being part of the band of 20 pioneers who started the movement, but stated that Lowe 'stood at the wheel of the woman's movement', and said she is 'the last actual member of that gallant pioneer band of twenty women'. Rennick argued that she could also claim that title, as she hosted the VWSS meeting, and posted the notice in the paper advertising it, and took a prominent role in organising until she resigned.

=== Death ===
Rennick died aged 91 on 12 August 1923 in Elsternwick in Victoria, Australia.
