= Suffrage in Australia =

Suffrage in Australia is the voting rights in the Commonwealth of Australia, its six component states (before 1901 called colonies) and territories, and local governments. The colonies of Australia began to grant universal male suffrage from 1856, with women's suffrage on equal terms following between the 1890s and 1900s. Some jurisdictions introduced racial restrictions on voting from 1885, and by 1902 most Australian residents who were not of European descent were explicitly or effectively excluded from voting and standing for office, including at the Federal level. Such restrictions had been removed by 1966. Today, the right to vote at all levels of government is held by citizens of Australia over the age of 18 years, excluding some prisoners and people "of unsound mind".

== History ==
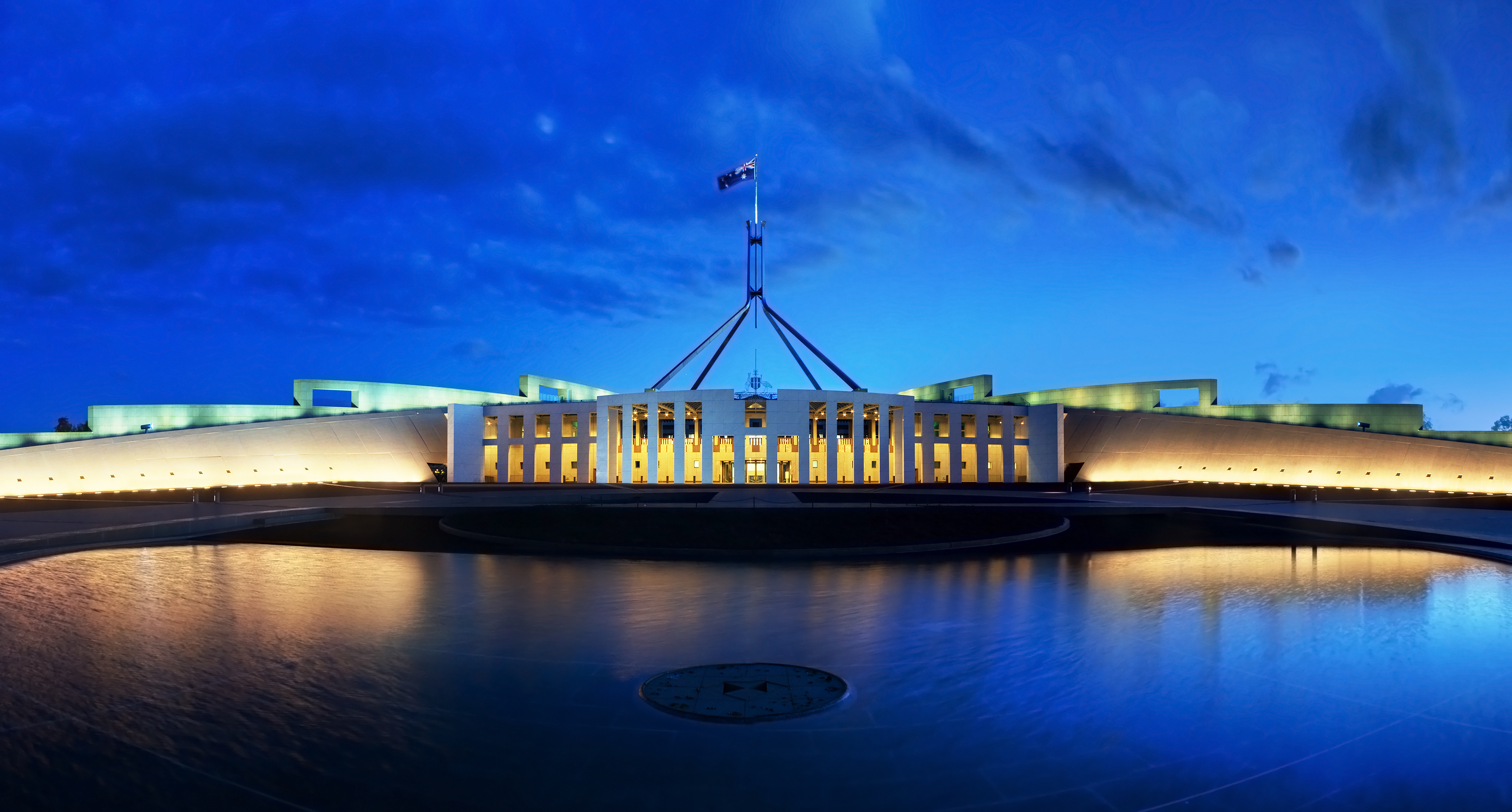
Parliament House, Canberra

=== Pre-parliamentary ===
The first governments established after 1788 were autocratic and run by appointed governors. The governors were subject to English law and were also responsible to the British parliament and relevant minister.

A legislative body, the New South Wales Legislative Council, was created in 1825, which was an appointed body whose function was to advise the Governor. On 24 August 1824, 5 members were appointed to the Council, which increased to 7 members in 1825, and between 10 and 15 in 1829.

A number of prominent colonial figures, including William Wentworth, campaigned for a greater degree of self-government, although there were divisions about the extent to which a future legislative body should be popularly elected. Other issues included traditional British political rights, land policy, transportation and whether a large population of convicts and former convicts could be trusted with self-government. The Australian Patriotic Association was formed in 1835 by Wentworth and William Bland to promote representative government for New South Wales.

Adelaide City Council was established in 1840 and the City of Sydney in 1842. The right to stand for election was limited to men who possessed £1000 worth of property and wealthy landowners were permitted up to four votes each in elections.

=== First parliamentary voting ===
The first parliamentary elections in Australia took place in 1843 for the New South Wales Legislative Council under the New South Wales Constitution Act 1842 (UK). The Council had 36 members, of which 12 were appointed by the Governor and the remainder were elected. The right to vote was limited to adult men with a freehold valued at £200 or a householder paying rent of £20 per year, both very large sums at the time. The property qualification meant that only 20 per cent of males were eligible to vote.

In 1850, Britain granted Van Diemen's Land, South Australia and the newly created colony of Victoria semi-elected Legislative Councils on the New South Wales model. Elections for the Legislative Councils were held in New South Wales, Victoria, South Australia and Van Diemen's Land in 1851 and produced a greater number of liberal members who agitated for full self-government. In 1852, the British Government announced that convict transportation to Van Diemen's Land would cease and invited the eastern colonies to draft constitutions enabling self-government.

The constitutions for New South Wales, Victoria and Van Diemen's Land (renamed Tasmania in 1856) gained royal assent in 1855, and that for South Australia in 1856. The constitutions varied, but each created a lower house elected on a broad male franchise and an upper house which was either appointed for life (New South Wales) or elected on a more restricted property franchise. Responsible self-government was granted to Tasmania (1 May 1855), South Australia (24 June 1856) New South Wales and Victoria (16 July 1855), Queensland (6 June 1859) and Western Australia in 1890.

=== Secret ballot ===
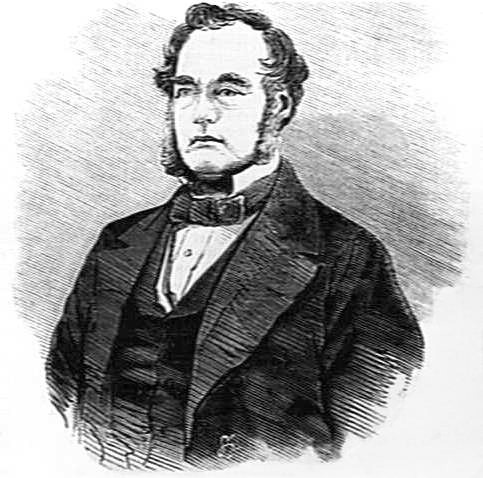
Boyle Travers Finniss became the first Premier of South Australia in 1856 - and the first leader of an Australian colonial parliament elected by universal male suffrage.

An innovative secret ballot was introduced in Tasmania on 4 February 1856, Victoria (13 March 1856), South Australia (12 February 1856), New South Wales (1858), Queensland (1859) and Western Australia (1877). A form of postal voting was introduced in Western Australia in 1877, followed by an improved method in South Australia in 1890.

=== Male suffrage ===
South Australia introduced universal male suffrage for its lower house in 1856, followed by Victoria in 1857, New South Wales (1858), Queensland (1872), Western Australia (1893) and Tasmania (1900). Western Australia and Queensland had racial restrictions and few Indigenous people exercised their right to vote in the other colonies (later states) before 1962 (see below).

=== Female suffrage ===
Propertied women in the colony of South Australia were granted the vote in local elections (but not parliamentary elections) in 1861. Henrietta Dugdale, Annie Lowe, and Elizabeth Rennick formed the Victorian Women's Suffrage Society, the first suffrage society in Australia in 1884. Societies to promote women's suffrage were also formed in South Australia in 1888 and New South Wales in 1891. The Women's Christian Temperance Union established branches in most Australian colonies in the 1880s, promoting votes for women and a range of social causes.

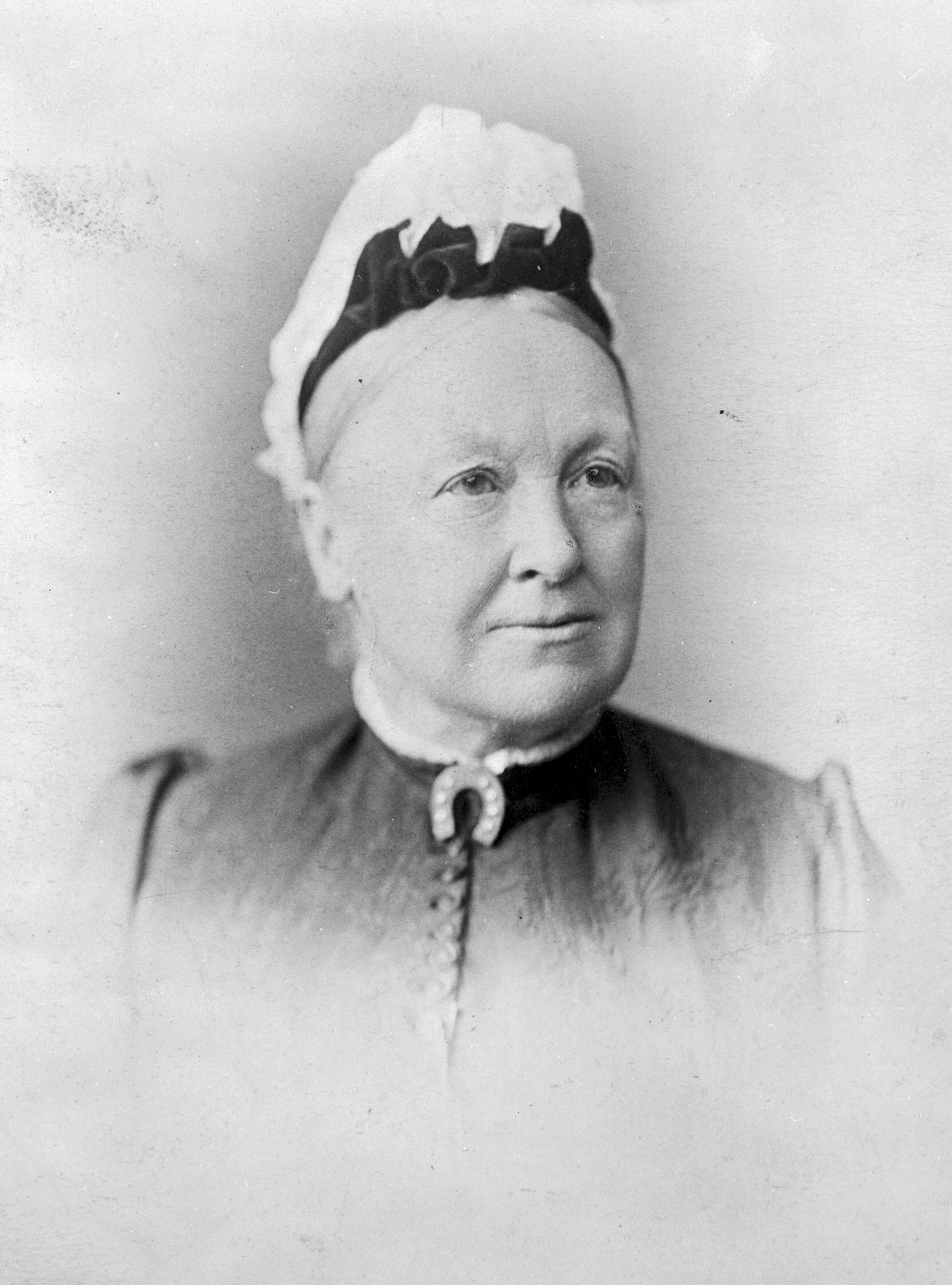
South Australian suffragist Catherine Helen Spence (1825–1910)

Female suffrage, and the right to stand for office, was first won in South Australia in 1895. (Note: The South Australian Parliament passed the legislation in December 1894 but the Act did not gain royal assent and become law until February 1895. South Australia celebrated the centenary of the female franchise in 1994; that is, 100 years from the date the legislation was passed by parliament rather that from the date it gained royal assent.) This was the first legislation in the world permitting women also to stand for election to political office. In 1897, Catherine Helen Spence became the first female political candidate for political office, unsuccessfully standing for election as a delegate to the Federal Convention on Australian Federation.

Women won the vote in Western Australia in 1899. Female suffrage was granted in New South Wales in 1902, Tasmania in 1903, Queensland in 1905 and Victoria in 1908. Western Australia and Queensland had racial restrictions and few Indigenous people exercised their right to vote in the other colonies (later states) before 1962 (see below).

The Commonwealth Franchise Act 1902 gave women the right to vote and stand for election for federal parliament but there were racial restrictions for both sexes. Four women stood as independents at the 1903 federal election but were unsuccessful.

=== Federation ===
In 1901, the six Australian colonies united to form the federal Commonwealth of Australia. The first election for the Commonwealth parliament in 1901 was based on the electoral laws at that time of the six colonies, so that those who had the right to vote and to stand for parliament at state level had the same rights for the 1901 Australian federal election.

In 1902, the Commonwealth Parliament passed the Commonwealth Franchise Act 1902, which established a uniform franchise law for the federal Parliament. The Act granted British subjects, male and female, over the age of 21 years who had been living in Australia for at least 6 months the right to vote and stand for election to federal parliament. However, the Act excluded "natives of Australia, Asia, Africa and the Pacific Islands (other than New Zealand)" from the federal franchise, unless they were already enrolled to vote in an Australian state. This meant that Australia was the second country, after New Zealand, to grant women's suffrage at a national level, and the first country to allow women to stand for parliament, although subject to the racial restrictions.

=== Northern Territory ===
From 1863 to 1911, the Northern Territory was a part of South Australia. In 1890, South Australia made the Northern Territory a separate electoral district with two parliamentary representatives and granted the vote to its adult males (and adult females from 1895). Indigenous Australians also had the right to vote. The status of South Australian voters also qualified them to vote in elections for both Houses of the Commonwealth Parliament at the first federal elections in 1901. In 1911, however, the Northern Territory was transferred to the Commonwealth government. The territory was placed under the direct control of the federal Minister for External Affairs and the population had no parliamentary representation or voting rights at the territory or federal level.

In 1922 the territory was granted one representative in the Australian House of Representatives. The member had limited voting rights and did not count for the purpose of forming government. Indigenous people were excluded from voting for the representative.

In 1947, the territory was granted a Legislative Council with six elected members and seven members appointed by the Administrator for the Northern Territory. Adult European residents of the territory were entitled to vote. In 1962, all Aboriginal Territorians were granted the right to vote in territorial and federal elections. In 1974, a fully elected Legislative Assembly was established and the Northern Territory had its first representative parliament. All adult Territorians were entitled to vote at the territory and federal level without racial restrictions.

=== Compulsory voting ===
In 1911, the Commonwealth introduced compulsory enrolment for voting at the federal level. Police were engaged to visit every Australian household and register eligible adults. Compulsory voting was introduced at the federal level in 1924 (in 1984 for Aboriginal Australians), at the state level in Victoria in 1926, followed by NSW (1928), Tasmania (1928), Western Australia (1936) and South Australia (1942).

== Racial restrictions ==
Aboriginal Australians and Torres Strait Islanders became British subjects as the colonies were settled throughout the continent, but actual participation in colonial society and access to civil rights was limited. Under the Queensland Elections Act (1885), no "aboriginal native of Australia, Asia, Africa, or the Islands of the Pacific" was entitled to vote. This restriction was extended to Torres Strait Islanders in 1930. In Western Australia, The Constitution Act Amendment Act of 1893 removed the property qualification for white male voters but retained it for "Aboriginal natives of Australia, Asia or Africa" and people of mixed descent. The property qualification (ownership of land that was valued at least £100) excluded virtually all such persons from the franchise.

At the federal level, the Commonwealth Franchise Act 1902, excluded "natives of Australia, Asia, Africa and the Pacific Islands (other than New Zealand)" from the federal franchise, unless they were already enrolled to vote in an Australian state as at 1 January 1901. However, some Aboriginal people were nevertheless struck off the rolls. In 1922, the Commonwealth government made regulations preventing Indigenous people from voting in elections for the newly created Northern Territory representative in the Commonwealth House of Representatives. In 1925, British-Indians who met the residency requirements of the Commonwealth Electoral Act 1918 and naturalised Asian Australians were exempted from the disqualification.

In 1949, the Commonwealth Electoral Bill was enacted giving Aboriginal people the right to vote at Commonwealth elections if they were enfranchised under a State law or were a current or former member of the defence forces. The Commonwealth Electoral Act 1961 removed the disqualification on Africans and Pacific Islanders, and the Commonwealth Electoral Act 1962 gave Indigenous Australians the option of enrolling to vote at Commonwealth and Northern Territory elections. The Commonwealth Electoral Amendment Act 1983, introduced compulsory voting for Indigenous Australians from 1984, as had been the case for other Australians since 1924.

At the state level, the Queensland Elections Act Amendment Act 1959 enfranchised British subjects who were natives of Asia or Africa. In 1962, Western Australia enfranchised Indigenous Australians and those of Asian, African or Pacific Islander descent. On 1 February 1966, Queensland extended voting rights to all Indigenous Australians, the last Australian jurisdiction to do so.

== Property restrictions ==
Voting in colonial elections was based on a property requirement until universal male suffrage was introduced for the lower houses of colonial parliaments from 1856 (see above). The colonial (later state) upper houses of Victoria, Tasmania and South Australia retained a property franchise whereas the upper houses of New South Wales and Victoria were appointed by the governor on the advice of the government. The South Australian Legislative Council was elected on a property-based franchise until 1973. The New South Wales Legislative Council was appointed until 1978. Since the 1970s, all the houses of Australian parliaments have been elected on a full adult franchise basis.

== Voting age ==
The voting age for colonial and state parliaments was 21 years until the 1970s. State voting age laws applied at the first federal election, and was legislated for federal elections in 1902, applying equally to men and women 21 years of age.

In World War I, members of the armed services under 21 had the vote in some states, and in World War II, the Commonwealth and some states made the same change. The states had lowered the voting age to 18 by 1973, the first being Western Australian in 1970. The voting age for all federal elections was lowered from 21 to 18 in 1973.

== Prisoners ==
At Federation, the Commonwealth Franchise Act 1902 disenfranchised those "attainted of treason, or who had been convicted and is under sentence or subject to be sentenced for any offence … punishable by imprisonment for one year or longer".

In 1983, this disenfranchisement was relaxed and prisoners serving a sentence for a crime punishable under the law for less than 5 years were allowed to vote. A further softening occurred in 1995 when the disenfranchisement was limited to those actually serving a sentence of 5 years or longer, although earlier that year the Keating government had been planning legislation to extend voting rights to all prisoners. Disenfranchisement does not continue after release from prison.

The Howard government legislated in 2006 to ban all prisoners from voting; but in 2007, the High Court in Roach v Electoral Commissioner found that the Constitution enshrined a limited right to vote, which meant that citizens serving relatively short prison sentences (generally less than 3 years) cannot be barred from voting. The threshold of 3 years or more sentence will result in removal of the prisoner from the federal electoral roll, and the person must re-enrol upon release.

Each state has its own prisoner disenfranchisement thresholds. For example, prisoners in NSW and Western Australia serving a sentence of longer than one year are not entitled to vote in State elections. In Victoria, persons are struck off the electoral roll if serving a prison sentence of 5 years or more. In Queensland elections, people serving prison sentences of 3 years or longer are not entitled to vote. In Tasmania people with a sentence of three years or more are ineligible to vote. There is no prisoner disenfranchisement in the Australian Capital Territory or South Australia.

American lawyer Megan A. Winder argues that the disenfranchisement of prisoners serving three years or more constitutes indirect discrimination and racism against Aboriginal people as they have a disproportionately high representation in the prisoner population. The High Court in Roach v Electoral Commissioner held that it was legitimate to exclude long-term prisoners from the franchise on the basis that they had broken their contract with society.

== Disenfranchisement of people of unsound mind ==
The Commonwealth Electoral Act 1918 (Cth) (the Electoral Act) states that "A person who...by reason of being of unsound mind, is incapable of understanding the nature and significance of enrolment and voting... is not entitled to have his or her name placed or retained on any Roll or to vote at any Senate election or House of Representatives election."

In November 2014 the Australian Law Reform Commission (ALRC) published the report "Equality, Capacity and Disability in Commonwealth Laws". The report recommended the removal of the "unsound mind" provision stating that it arguably violates Australia's obligations under the United Nations Convention on the Rights of Persons with Disabilities (CRPD), to guarantee that persons with disability can "effectively and fully participate in political and public life on an equal basis with others, directly or through freely chosen representatives, including the right and opportunity for persons with disabilities to vote and be elected, including the right and opportunity to vote and be elected". The ALRC report made recommendations as to how to support Australians with disabilities in voting.

The Human Rights Law Centre has stated that the exclusion of persons of "unsound mind" from the franchise "is vague, stigmatising and overly broad, and does not reflect the true capacity of people with disabilities to make decisions about voting".

== Voter suppression ==
Further information: Voter Suppression

Apart from legal disenfranchisement, there have historically been other forms of voter suppression on racial and other grounds. While there were no specific restrictions in legislation on Indigenous people voting in most jurisdictions, other barriers often prevented them exercising that right and there were instances where those with voting rights were discouraged from voting. Between 1858 and 1926, New South Wales disqualified persons receiving aid from "any public charitable institution" from voting, and anyone living in Aboriginal reserves were considered to be receiving aid. Some exceptions were afforded to landholders and "half-caste" Aboriginals. In South Australia, most Indigenous people did not meet the requirement that all voters reside at a particular address for a specified period.

== Voting by foreigners ==
Before 26 January 1949, people born in Australia were known under Australian law as "British subjects", and there was no legal distinction between them and other British subjects. From 1949, anyone born in Australia was officially termed an Australian citizen, although British subjects retained voting rights in Australia.

All British subjects who were enrolled to vote in Australia before 26 January 1984 retain voting rights at federal and state elections in Australia. As of that date, the right of other British subjects to enrol to vote was abolished. A right to vote has been grandfathered: a British national who was enrolled to vote before 26 January 1984 can re-enrol at any time, even if his/her enrolment has lapsed subsequently for any reason. British nationals on the electoral roll, like all other people enrolled to vote in Australia, are subject to compulsory voting, and are required by law to attend a polling place on election days.

== Local government ==
In most cases, local government electoral rolls have the same voting criteria as the relevant state. In some local government areas voting is also open to people who rent or own property or a business in that local government area.

== See also ==
- History of Australia
- Human rights in Australia
- List of Australian suffragists
- List of suffragists and suffragettes
- Timeline of women's suffrage
- Māori voting rights in Australia

== Sources ==
- Bellanta, Melissa (2013). "Rethinking the 1890s". In Bashford, Alison; Macintyre, Stuart (eds.). The Cambridge History of Australia, Volume 1, Indigenous and Colonial Australia. Cambridge University Press. ISBN 978-1-1070-1153-3.
- Bennett, Scott (2001). "Indigenous voting rights in Australia" (PDF). Australasian Parliamentary Review. 16 (1). Australasian Study of Parliament Group: 16–20. Archived (PDF) from the original on 29 March 2020.
- Curthoys, Ann; Mitchell, Jessie (2013). "The advent of self-government". In Bashford, Alison; Macintyre, Stuart (eds.). The Cambridge History of Australia, Volume 1, Indigenous and Colonial Australia. Cambridge University Press. ISBN 978-1-1070-1153-3.
- Evans, Julie; Grimshaw, Patricia; Philips, David; Swain, Shurlee (2003). Equal subjects, unequal rights: Indigenous peoples in British settler colonies, 1830–1910 (PDF). Manchester University Press. doi:10.7228/manchester/9780719060038.001.0001. ISBN 978-0-71906-003-8. Archived (PDF) from the original on 8 February 2023.
- Hirst, John (2004). "The Distinctiveness of Australian Democracy, Lectures in the Senate Occasional Lecture Series 2003–2004". Papers on Parliament. 42. Department of the Senate, Parliament House, Canberra. ISSN 1031-976X.
- Hirst, John (2014). Australian History in 7 Questions. Melbourne: Black Inc. ISBN 9781863956703.
- Jaensch, Dean (1990). The Legislative Council of the Northern Territory: An Electoral History 1947-1974. Darwin: Australian National University North Australia Research Unit. ISBN 0731508734.
- Macintyre, Stuart (2020). A Concise History of Australia (5th ed.). Port Melbourne: Cambridge University Press. ISBN 9781108728485.
- Norberry, Jennifer; Williams, George (2002). "Voters and the Franchise: the Federal Story". Australian Parliamentary Library, Parliament of Australia.
- Phillips, Harry (2013). Electoral Law in the State of Western Australia: An Overview (PDF) (2nd ed.). Perth: Western Australian Electoral Commission. ISBN 9780980417340.
- Shaw, A. G. L. (1983). The Story of Australia (5th ed.). London: Faber and Faber. ISBN 0571180744.
- Stephen, Ninian (2000). "Australian Citizenship: Past, Present and Future". Monash University Law Review. 26 (2). Monash University: 333–338. Archived from the original on 16 October 2021 – via Australasian Legal Information Institute.
