= Victorian Women's Suffrage Petition =

Petition presented to the Parliament of Victoria in 1891

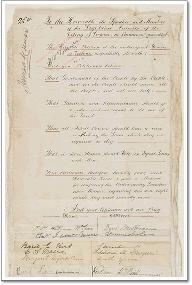
- Presented: 1891
- Location: Public Record Office Victoria
- Subject: Women's Suffrage

The Victorian Women's Suffrage Petition, also known as the Monster Petition, was collected, collated, and presented to the Victorian Parliament in 1891 by groups seeking women's suffrage in Victoria. It was one of the largest known petitions from the 19th century, and it demanded the right to vote for women in the Colony of Victoria, Australia. It contains nearly 30,000 Victorian women's signatures. It was gathered in a six month period 1891 by women's suffrage activists and was organised by a coalition of groups such as the Woman's Christian Temperance Union of Victoria (WCTU), the Victorian Temperance Alliance, the Victorian Women's Suffrage Society, and the Australian Women's Suffrage Society.

While the petition failed to win the suffrage bill that it supported in 1891, the petition had a lasting impact because it proved that a large proportion of women in Victoria wanted the vote, rather than just a fringe group of women as women's suffrage critics suggested.

The petition is held at the Public Record Office Victoria, and was transcribed and made available as a searchable digitised database by the Parliament of Victoria website. In 2008 the Victorian Government, Arts Victoria, and the City of Melbourne commissioned a sculpture of the petition called the Great Petition, located at the Burston Reserve, near Parliament House.

== Background ==
In 1890, the Woman's Christian Temperance Union of Victoria (WCTU) passed a resolution in support of women's suffrage. When parliament resumed in 1891, they aligned with the Victorian Temperance Alliance, in a deputation to the Premier of Victoria, James Munro, who was an advocate for the Temperance movement. Munro asked whether they were just asking for women ratepayer's to have the vote, and the deputation responded, "We are asking for, and expecting to get the same privileges as our brothers." Munro promised to bring the matter before his cabinet, however, at that time he was in a politically precarious position as his government was made up of a fragile coalition of Liberals who were unhappy with the economy, independents, and two Labor members. He suggested that there would need to be a united and representative agitation for successful women's suffrage legislation. The WCTU approached the two other prominent suffrage organisations, The Victorian Women's Suffrage Society, and the Australian Women's Suffrage Society, who agreed to collaborate on a petition.

== The petition ==
It took six months for the suffragists to collect women's signatures by going door to door in Melbourne and in country towns all around Victoria. They were prepared with strategies for dealing with those who might rebuff them with anti-suffrage arguments. Vida Goldstein was twenty-two years old when she was recruited by her mother Isabella Goldstein to work as a canvasser collecting signatures. Vida later said that they received many positive responses, and the great majority of women wanted the vote. She said working class households were particularly positive about woman's suffrage. However, there were some women who declined to sign. Goldstein said these were women "whose interests ended at the garden gate".

In the end the petition contained nearly 30,000 names of women. The signatures were collected from women in 800 towns and suburbs across Victoria. Each page of the petition was glued to a length of material, 200 millimetres wide and 260 metres long, and rolled onto a carboard spindle. The petition took three hours to roll it from one spindle to another, and required three people to do so. It is the largest known petition from the 19th century. The petition was nicknamed the 'Monster Petition' and had to be carried by a number of attendants in the Legislative Chamber due to its bulky size.

It was presented on 29 September 1891 to accompany a second reading of a bill which combined a women's suffrage with the abolishment of plural voting. The bill passed by the Victorian Legislative Assembly, 39-13. However, Munro's supporters were outraged that he risked the bill to abolish plural voting by combining it with women's suffrage. Their protests caused him to remove the women's suffrage element of the bill before it made it to the Victorian Legislative Council. The bill was rejected by the Council anyway. The WCTU stated that it was a disservice to the efforts of the suffrage movement that women's suffrage was connected to a bill to abolish plural voting.

While the bill was unsuccessful, the petition still made an important impact. It scuppered the argument that only a few radical women supported women's suffrage. With so many names on the petition, it was a clear message that a large proportion of women in Victoria did want the vote.

== Legacy ==
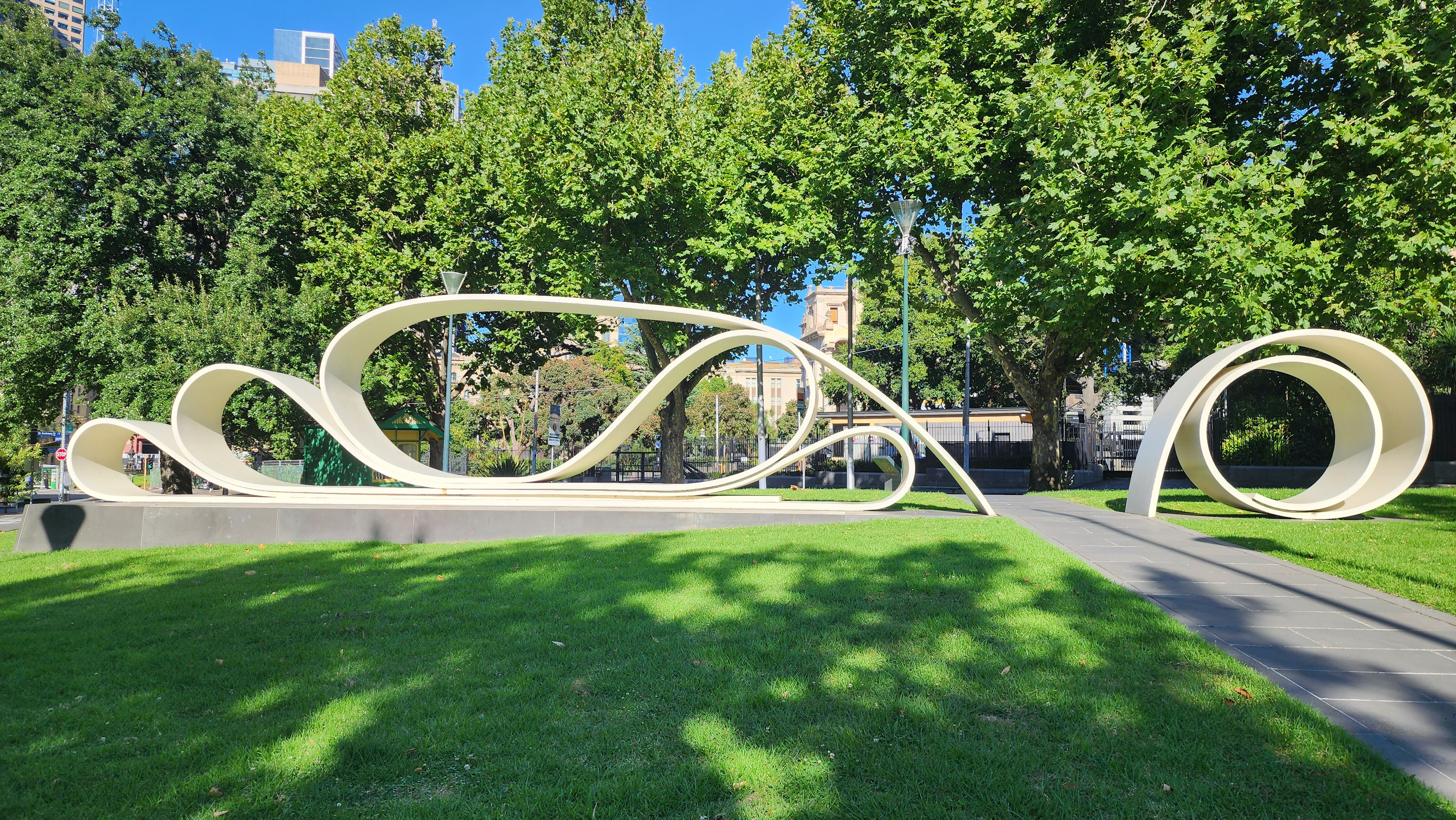
Great Petition sculpture in Burston Reserve, near Parliament House

In 1908, seventeen years after the petition was presented to the parliament, most Victorian women were granted the right to vote. By this time, the federal parliament, and all other state parliaments had already passed women's suffrage legislation. Notably the passing of the South Australian Constitutional Amendment (Adult Suffrage) Act 1894 which was influenced by a very similar South Australian Women's Suffrage Petition of approximately 11,000 signatures.

The bill that finally passed, on 18 November 1908, was the 19th women's suffrage bill introduced to Victorian parliament. However, this bill did not provide all women with voting rights. The Commonwealth Franchise Act 1902 specifically prohibited 'Aboriginal native' people of Australia, Asia, Africa, and the Pacific Islands, other than New Zealand, unless they were already on the voting rolls. In 1962, the Australian federal government repealed the 1902 Commonwealth Act, finally allowing Aboriginal people the vote in all states, other than Queensland.

The Victorian Women's Suffrage Petition is held by the Public Records Office Victoria. The document was transcribed and the Parliament of Victoria made a searchable database available on their website in 2006.

On 3 December 2008, the Victorian Government, Arts Victoria, and the City of Melbourne commemorated 100 years of women's suffrage in Victoria by launching a monument called the Great Petition. It was created by Susan Hewitt and Penelope Lee, and is located at the Burston Reserve, near Parliament House. It contains a didactic panel with a history of the women's suffrage movement in Victoria written by Marilyn Lake.

In 2014, the petition went on public display at the Museum of Australian Democracy at Eureka, in Ballarat.
