= United Council for State Suffrage =

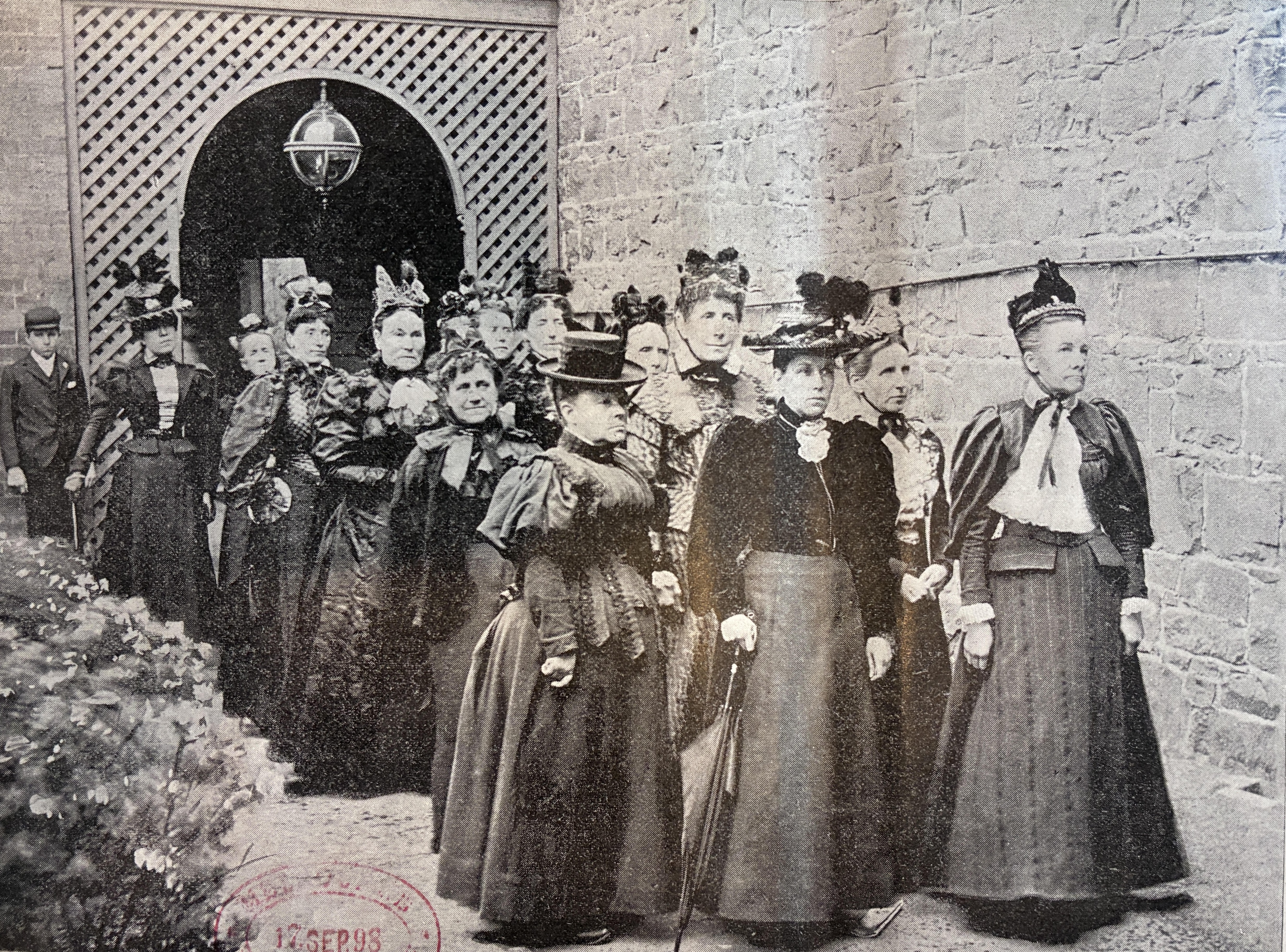
- Deputation to the Legislative Council, 6 September 1898
- Formation: 1894
- Founder: Annette Bear-Crawford
- Dissolved: 1908
- Purpose: Women's suffrage in Victoria
- Location: Victoria, Australia
- Members: 32 Organisations (1900)
- Foundation president and secretary (1894 - 1898): Annette Bear-Crawford
- Organising secretary (1898 - 1901): Vida Goldstein
- Organising secretary (1901 - 1904): Lilian Locke
- President (c.1902 - 1908): Annie Lowe
- Key people: Ina Higgins (Treasurer)
- Formerly called: United Council for Woman Suffrage

The United Council for State Suffrage (UCSS), formerly the United Council for Woman Suffrage, was founded in the Colony of Victoria, Australia, in 1894 by Annette Bear-Crawford, to unite the existing groups who were fighting for women's suffrage in Victoria, and to create a coordinated effort to agitate for legislative change. The UCSS was an umbrella organisation that did not disrupt the efforts, or broader agendas of the individual groups, but brought them together on the singular focus of gaining the vote for women first in the Colony of Victoria, and then after the Federation of Australia, the State of Victoria.

== Formation ==
At the time there were a number of groups working towards women's suffrage including the Australian Women's Suffrage Society, the Victorian Women's Suffrage Society, and the Woman's Christian Temperance Union of Victoria (WCTU). Annette Bear-Crawford convinced the groups that they needed to be united through another organisation to coordinate their lobbying efforts. Each group had a had three representatives on the council, and they were encouraged discussion about civil, and social welfare, the family and the home.

The role of the council was to publish literature, and direct policy, lobbying the parliament, and meeting with politicians and candidates. It also organised house-to-house canvassing across the districts. The individual organizations still organised their own deputations and gatherings, the council organised larger more central ones.

== Activity ==
=== 1894 - 1898 Bear-Crawford era ===
Not long after the council was formed in 1894, William Maloney of the Australian Women's Suffrage Society, submitted his second bill for women's suffrage to the Victorian Legislative Assembly.

In 1896, the UCSS turned their attention to the School Boards of Advice, and successfully campaigned to have ten women elected. The council then developed a strategy to focus on municipal councils, and began to question the male candidates on their stance on women's suffrage, and organised large numbers of women rate payers to vote. It was suggested that more women may have voted than men. This strategy received a backlash from the men who felt their seats had been put in jeopardy, and when the candidates gathered again, they viciously attacked women's suffrage. In response to these attacks, some men walked out in protest.

In 1898, due to pressure by the suffrage groups a bill for women's right to vote was introduced and passed the 52-29 in the Assembly. This was the first women's suffrage bill to face the Victorian Legislative Council. The UCSS organised a deputation of 300 women to support the bill on 6 September. The women arrived and despite the pre-planning, they were made to wait for 45 minutes while the councillors drank champagne. The women's speeches were interrupted by the councillors heckling with rude remarks. Two of the younger women in the group were accosted by a councillor who leered at them and said "You girls- you don't want votes. You want- Something else." This behaviour was met with anger from the suffragists around the country and the Womanhood Suffrage League of New South Wales forwarded their passed resolution of indignation to the president of the Legislative Council William Zeal. When Zeal presented the bill, he protested the press coverage of the event, and claimed that the deputation had broken the rules of trying to influence the parliament with their large number. The bill was defeated 19-15.

=== 1899 Bear-Crawford’s death ===
In November of 1898 Bear-Crawford had travelled to London to attend the 1899 International Congress of Women. Goldstein and Ina Higgins agreed to run the UCSS while she was away. However, while she was there she caught pneumonia and died in June of 1899, at 46 years of age. This was a blow to the suffrage movement in Victoria. A memorial service for Bear-Crawford was held at St Paul's Cathedral, Melbourne, on the 4th of July, which was the first time such a service was held for a woman in Melbourne.

=== 1899 - 1901 Goldstein era ===
Goldstein became the successor as the secretary of the council, despite some misgivings of some of the other members who saw her as too radical. However, Goldstein was an intelligent effective leader. She was very good at public speaking, and engaging the press, and audiences responded well to her wit, dignity, and ability to command respect from even those who disagreed with her. Goldstein was appointed the organising secretary. Ina Higgins was appointed on the committee from 1900. Edith Judd was treasurer for a number of years. During her tenure as secretary, Goldstein expanded the council, and by 1900 it had 32 member organisations. From 1900, Goldstein was paid to work in this role fulltime.

In January 1901 the UCSS issued a manifesto 'Who Rules Victoria?' The manifesto criticises the Victorian Upper house for blocking suffrage bills, and the lower house for accepting the status quo, and states:

"No good purpose can be served by further postponing an issue which should long ago have been settled, and which, as every one is fully aware, must be settled before any really progressive legislation can be carried through in Victoria. Who is to rule? Are we to have representative government or despotism by a handful entrenched behind a constitutional anachronism? That is the issue and the only issue."

In mid-1901, Goldstein resigned as Secretary, but remained on the Parliamentary committee.

=== 1901 - 1908 Post Federation ===
When Goldstein resigned from the council in 1901, her good friend Lilian Locke took over the role.

In January 1903, Locke issued another manifesto on the society’s behalf which criticised Victoria lagging behind other states regarding women’s suffrage. Then in February, after another women’s suffrage bill had been thwarted by political power plays in the parliament, a ‘grand suffrage demonstration’ was held at the town hall. Annie Lowe and Locke both gave speeches, with Locke accusing the upper house of protecting their own personal wealth and power over granting women suffrage, stating they had “a system of lopping off everybody’s head but their own”. This same year the society changed its name from the ‘United Council for Woman Suffrage’ to the ‘United Council for State Suffrage’.

Locke resigned as secretary in February 1904, and was replaced briefly by Miss Hume, then by Mrs Barnes.

In that year, Thomas Bent became the premier of Victoria, and began a campaign of blocking all bills and discussion of women's suffrage. This position was in part due to Bent's personal opinions about women's suffrage, but also because he and his Liberal and Conservative parties feared that women voting would increase Victorian Labor Party's power in the state. He blamed the newly enfranchised women of Australia for the Australian Labor Party’s victory in the 1903 Federal Election. In November of 1904, Bent refused to receive a deputation from the UCSS stating he had no time for them.

Goldstein, watching on from the outside grew frustrated with the council and announced in January of 1905:

"The Council accomplished nothing last year; there is no evidence that there is likely to be any vitality this year, and I for one am not willing to let this policy of drift continue. The U.C.S.S. having been given every opportunity to lead the suffrage army, has failed."

She then proposed that her own organisation, the Women's Political Association, which had previously been focussed on educating women about politics, would now focus on leading the suffrage movement. While the Women's Political Association did step up as an effective suffrage organisation, it did not take over, and worked with the other organisations, including the UCSS, by this time represented by their president Annie Lowe. Bent was arrogant, stubborn, and held contempt for the suffrage movement, and actively focused on blocking their lobbying. He and his government would continue to block suffrage legislation, until 1908. In 1908, a bill was finally passed, the leaders of the suffrage movements had their photograph taken on 5 December in the Botanic gardens and then 2 days later threw a victory celebration called a Commemoration Conversazione which had a large attendance.

== Affiliated groups ==
- The Victorian Women's Suffrage Society.
- The Australian Women's Suffrage Society.
- The Victorian Women's Suffrage League.
- The Woman's Christian Temperance Union of Victoria.
- The Victorian Women's Franchise League, as well as divisions of the league in Brunswick, Castlemaine, Bendigo, Ararat, and Horsham.
- The Women's Political and Social Crusade
- The Central Methodist Mission
- The Trades Hall council
- The Australian Church Social Improvement Society.
- The Victorian Alliance.
- The Victorian Lady Teachers' Association.
- The metropolitan Women's Progressive League as well as other Women's Progressive League divisions from Prahran, St. Kilda, Ballarat, South Melbourne, Kew, Essendon, Collingwood, Malvern, Canterbury, West Melbourne, Footscray, and Richmond.
