= Lilian Locke =

Australian Labour activist and suffragist (1869–1950)

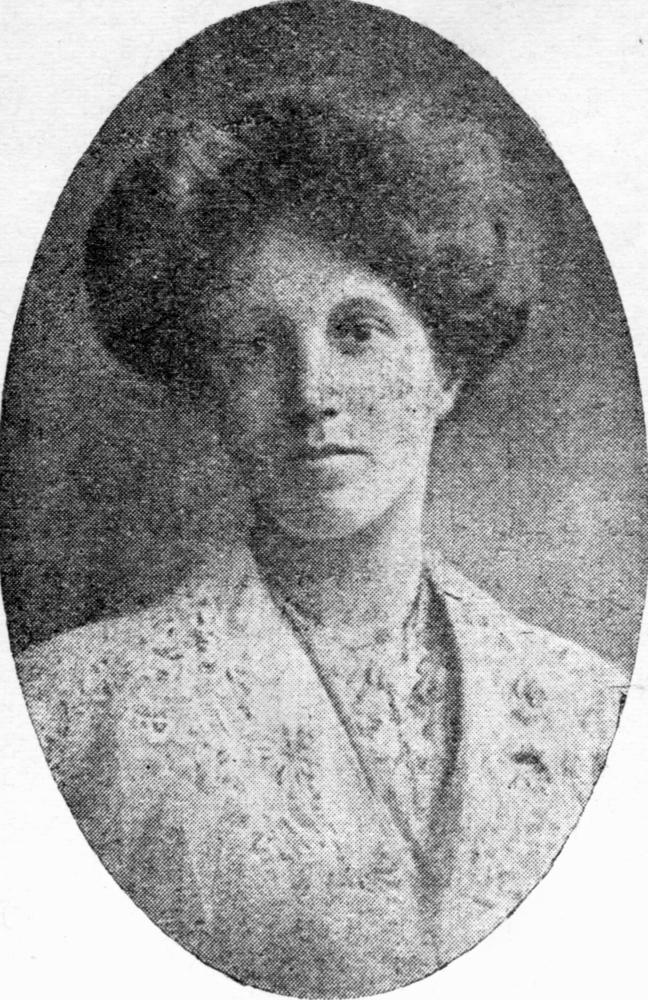
- Lilian Locke, c.1905
- Born: 6 June 1869; Melbourne, Victoria
- Died: 1 July 1950 (aged 81); North Sydney, New South Wales
- Other name: Lilian Sophia Burns
- Known for: President of the New South Wales Association of Women Workers; Organiser for the Political Labor Council; Honorary secretary of the United Council for State Suffrage
- Political party: Labor Party
- Movement: Suffragist; activist
- Relatives: Sumner Locke (sister)

Lilian Sophia Locke (later Lilian Sophia Burns; 6 June 1869 – 1 July 1950) was an Australian trade unionist, political campaigner and suffragist. She has been described as one of the earliest women leaders of the labour movement in Australia.

== Early life ==
Her father was the Rev. William Locke, an Anglican clergyman in Victoria, and her grandfather English reformer William Locke. She was born in Melbourne, one of ten girls; one of her sisters was the author Sumner Locke. She was a friend of Vida Goldstein, having worked with her since the suffrage campaigns of the 1890s.

She married George Burns, then a Tasmanian state Labor politician, in Melbourne on 6 January 1906.

== Career ==
She was variously president of the New South Wales Association of Women Workers, the "only lady member of the Melbourne Trades Hall Council", lady organiser for the Political Labor Council, and honorary secretary of the United Council for State Suffrage. In 1905, she was the first woman delegate to a Labor Party interstate conference, when she was accredited for Tasmania at the Commonwealth Political Labor Conference. She regularly travelled Australia as an organiser for the Labor Party between the start of World War I and 1940. Her skills were widely praised in the labor press: the Brisbane Worker labelled her a "brilliant organiser and propagandist", the Daily Standard in Brisbane described her as "one of the ablest women Labor platform exponents in the Commonwealth", while the Worker in New South Wales stated that "a great deal of the effectiveness of Mr. Burns' political activity must be credited to the splendid help accorded him by his wife, Lilian Locke Burns". She was often described as being well-received and speaking to large audiences. One visit to South Australia was credited with the foundation of the Women Employees' Mutual Association in that state.

She was also a keen writer who published work in magazines, and was reportedly "especially known by her short stories". She was a regular contributor to labour journal The Tocsin.

== Recognition ==
A 1988 book, Silk and Calico: Class, Gender and the Vote, by Betty Searle, explored the first wave of the feminist movement in Australia through the lives of Locke, Goldstein and Rose Scott.
