= Brettena Smyth =

(1840–1898) Australian women's rights activist

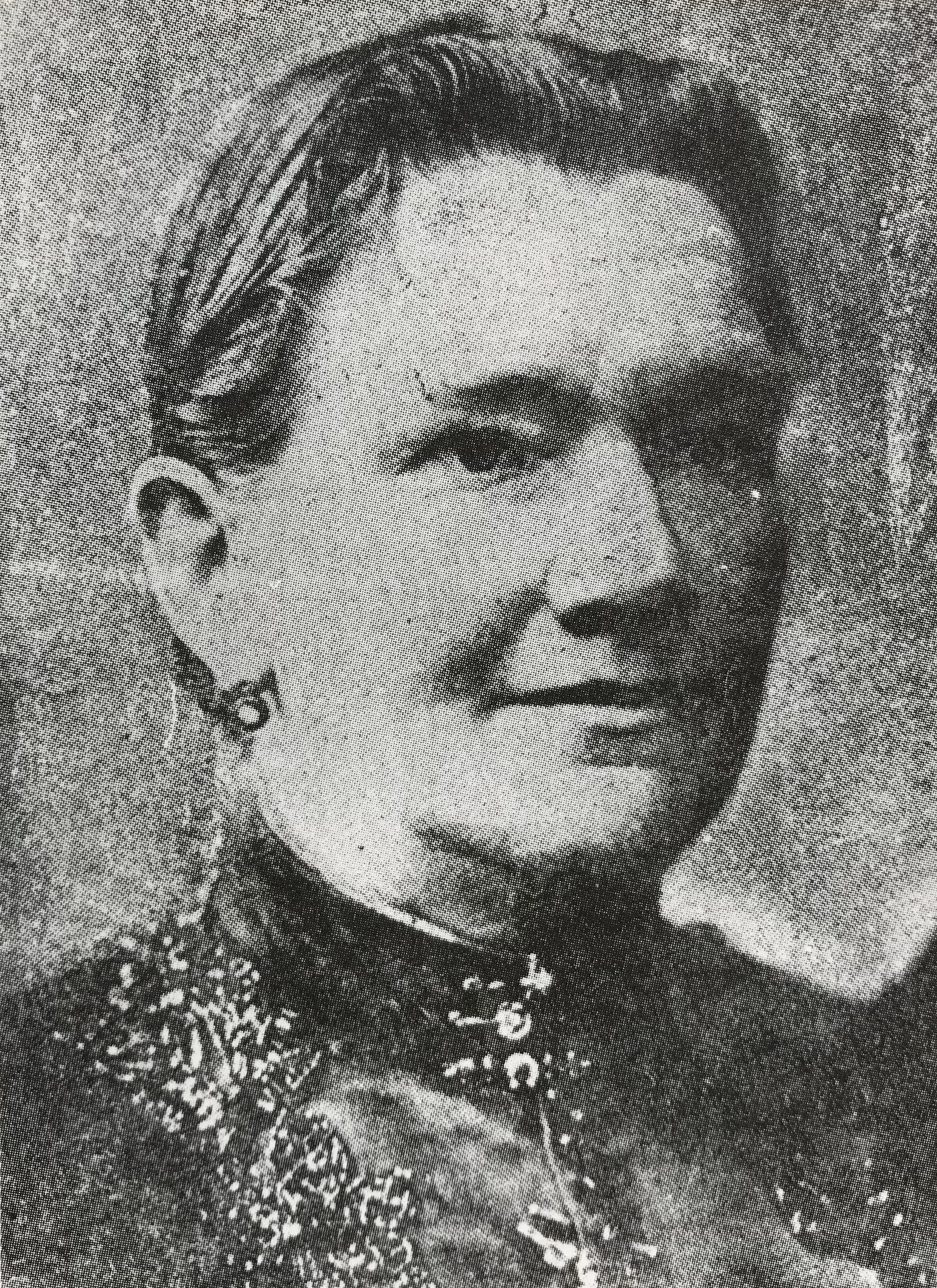
- Born: Bridgetena Riordan; 1845; Kyneton, Victoria, Australia
- Died: 15 February 1898 (aged 52); Morwell, Victoria, Australia
- Occupations: Businesswoman; Suffragist
- Organization: Australian Women's Suffrage Society
- Title: Founder
- Movement: Birth control; Women's Suffrage
- Children: 5

Bridgetena "Brettena" Smyth (née Riordan; 1845 – 15 February 1898) was an Australian women's rights activist. She was also an entrepreneur, converting the family store into a drapery business and drug store after her husband's death.

== Biography ==
=== Early life and marriage ===
The daughter of John Riordan and Bridgetena Cavanagh, she was born in Kyneton. She was largely self-taught but an avid reader. In 1861, she married William Taylor Smyth, a greengrocer; the couple had five children.

=== Career ===
After her husband died in 1873, Smyth converted the family store into a drapery business and drug store. She also became an active member of the Victorian Women's Suffrage Society in 1885, and was elected as Secretary in July 1888, however after a disagreement at a committee meeting in August, Smyth and a number of other members resigned. The next month she founded the Australian Women's Suffrage Society and became its president.

An advocate of birth control, she lectured on contraceptive techniques and sold a women's contraceptive device, a rubber pessary from France, in her shop. She advocated a more balanced partnership between men and women in marriage.

She planned to study medicine at the University of Melbourne but was thwarted by the financial crisis during the 1890s.

=== Death and legacy ===
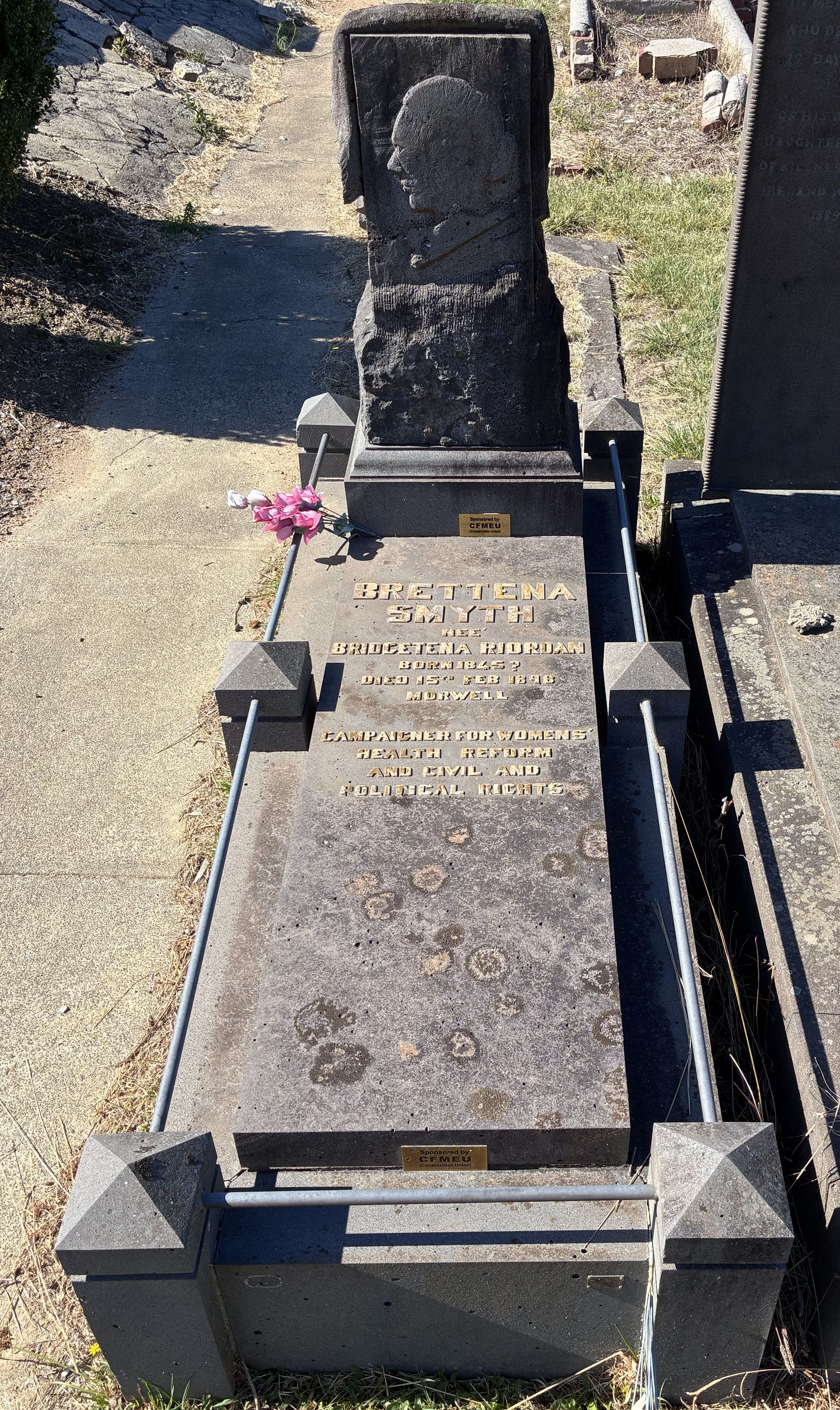
Smyth's restored grave, Melbourne General Cemetery.

Smyth died of Bright's disease at the residence of her son, Charles Smyth, Cricketers' Hotel, Morwell. "Fortified by rites of Holy Church", she was buried in Melbourne General Cemetery.

On 13 March 1995, on the 139th anniversary of Labour day, Joan Kirner dedicated a memorial at Smyth's unmarked grave at Melbourne General Cemetery. At the suggestion of Helen D. Harris, the Labour Historical Graves Committee had organised the bluestone grave and headstone, created by stonemason Andrew Patience, and funded by the CFMEU. It was the first time a woman was honoured by the committee.

== Publications ==
- Love, Courtship and Marriage (1892)
- The Limitation of Offspring (1893)
- The Social Evil (1894)
- What Every Woman Should Know: Diseases Incidental to Women (1895)
