= Centenary of Women's Suffrage Gazebo =

Coordinates: 32°29′43″S 118°16′04″E

The Centenary of Women's Suffrage Gazebo is located in the town of Kondinin, Western Australia. It was built in 1999 to commemorate the centenary of women's suffrage in Western Australia.

== See also ==
- List of monuments and memorials to women's suffrage
- Suffrage in Australia
