= Henrietta Dugdale =

Australian suffragist

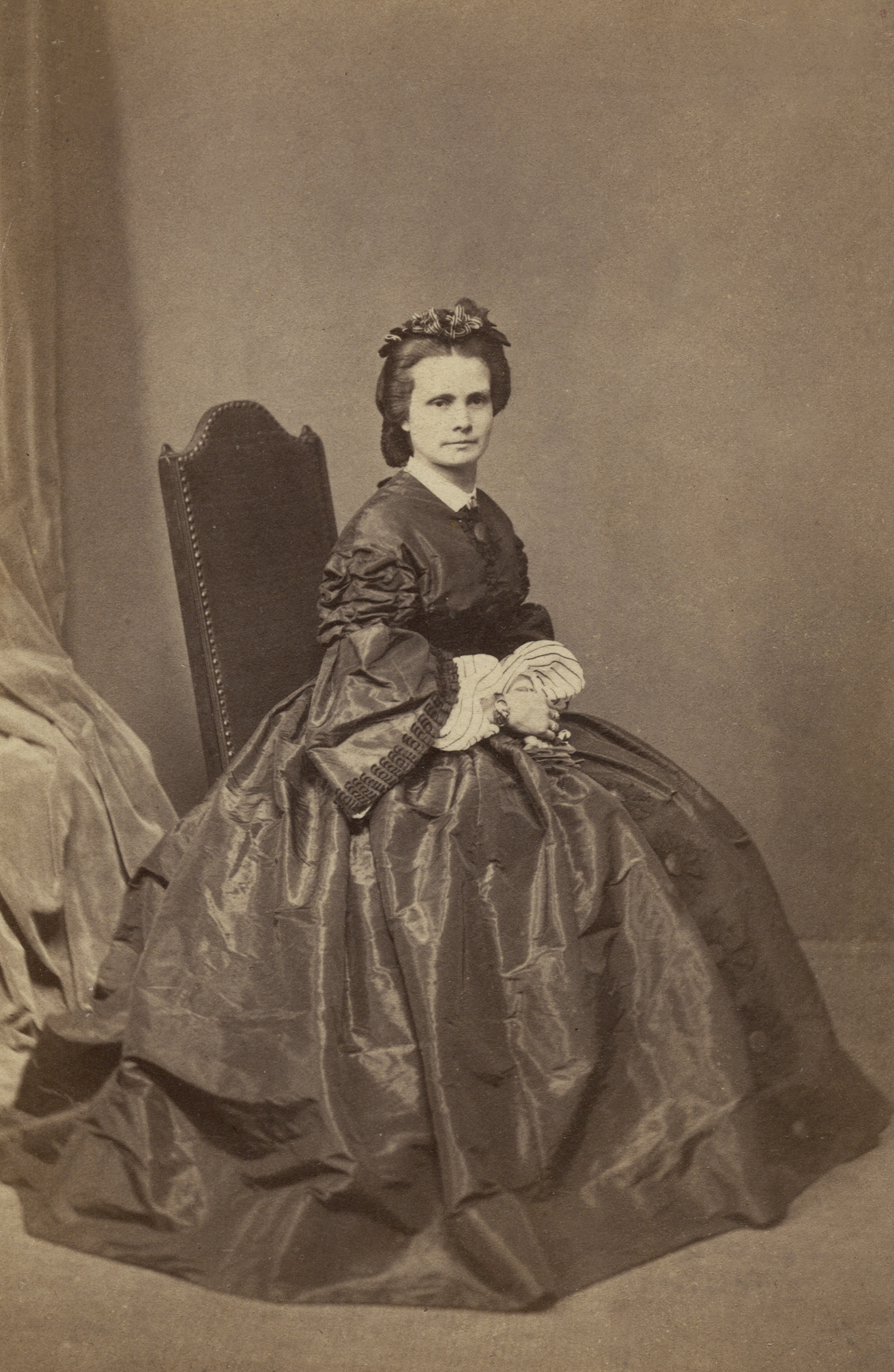
- Henrietta Dugdale c. 1845
- Born: Henrietta Augusta Worrell; 14 May 1827; London, United Kingdom
- Died: 17 June 1918 (aged 91); Point Lonsdale, Victoria, Australia
- Occupation: Suffragist
- Spouse(s): J. A. Davies (m.1848–1852); William Dugdale (m.1853–?); Frederick Johnson (m.1903–his death)

Henrietta Augusta Dugdale (née Worrell; 14 May 1827 – 17 June 1918) was a pioneer Australian who initiated the first women's suffrage society in Australia. Non-conformist, provocative and quick-witted, her campaigning resulted in breakthroughs for women's rights in Australia.

== Early life and education ==
Henrietta Augusta Worrell was born at St Pancras London on 14 May 1827, the second surviving daughter of John Worrell and Henrietta Ann (née Austin). Her claim of a first marriage at 14 does not fit with her official marriage in 1848 to a merchant navy officer J. A. Davies, with whom she came to Australia in 1852. After Davies' death she married ship's captain William Dugdale in Melbourne in March 1853. They settled at Queenscliff where sons Einnim, Carl and Austin were born. Dugdale was a vegetarian.

After separating from William Dugdale in the late 1860s, she moved to the Melbourne suburb of Camberwell where she remained until a few years before her death on 17 June 1918 at Point Lonsdale. Her third husband Frederick Johnson, whom she married in 1903, predeceased her.

== Career ==
Dugdale's campaign for 'equal justice for women' began with a letter to Melbourne's Argus newspaper in April 1869. It peaked during the 1880s in radical public debate as a member of Melbourne's Eclectic Society and the Australasian Secular Association, through her utopian allegory A Few Hours in a Far-Off Age and in the formation in May 1884 of the Victorian Women's Suffrage Society, the first of its kind in Australia. That same year, Henrietta wrote a scathing judgement of the Victorian courts, and their inability to protect women from violent crimes. Published in the Melbourne Herald, her words cut straight to the core of the issue: 'Women's anger,' she wrote, 'was compounded by the fact that those who inflicted violence upon women had a share in making the laws while their victims did not.'

Dugdale was acknowledged as a suffrage pioneer when Australian women attained the vote and the associated right to stand for federal parliament in June 1902 (a world first) and when the State of Victoria belatedly followed suit in December 1908. Dugdale died on 17 June 1918 in Point Lonsdale, Australia.

== Legacy ==
A street in the Canberra suburb of Cook is named for her.

In 2013, Dugdale was nationally recognised as a critical first-wave Australian feminist, and The Dugdale Trust for Women & Girls, is named in honour of her life's work. Dugdale was inducted into the Victorian Honour Roll of Women in 2001. The Dugdale Trust for Women & Girls is a national harm-prevention institution for which The Victorian Women's Trust operates as trustee.

== See also ==
- List of suffragists and suffragettes
- List of women's rights activists
- Women and government in Australia
- Politics of Australia
- Human Rights in Australia
- Suffrage in Australia
- Women's suffrage in Australia
- Timeline of women's suffrage
