= Australian Women's Suffrage Society =

- Formation: 1888
- Founder: Brettena Smyth
- Dissolved: 1898
- Purpose: Gaining the vote for women in Victoria
- Affiliations: United Council for Woman Suffrage

The Australian Women's Suffrage Society (AWSS), was founded in the Colony of Victoria, Australia, in 1888 by Brettena Smyth, after she resigned from the Victorian Women's Suffrage Society. The organisation advocated for women's right to vote, as well as their right to voluntary motherhood. William Maloney was a prominent member, and he introduced women's suffrage bills to the Victorian Legislative Assembly a number of times between 1889 and 1894.

== Background ==
Smyth had been an active member of the Victorian Women's Suffrage Society, up until August of 1888, having recently been elected as secretary in July. However, there was a disagreement within the organisation, leading her and five committee members to resign. The Victorian Women's Suffrage Society had also been unsupportive of Smyth's broader ideas on women's rights, which were quite radical for the time. Smyth believed women had the right to voluntary motherhood, and she was a proponent of effective contraception.

== Activity ==
The first meeting was held on 17 September 1888, at the North Melbourne home of Jane Maloney, who was the mother of William Maloney. Smyth presided over the meeting, and was elected as the secretary. Rev. Dr Charles Strong was elected as president.

William Maloney, who was a politician in the Victorian Legislative Assembly. Maloney put forward several of women's suffrage bills to the Victorian parliament between 1889, and 1894. The first bill he put forward was his first act as an MP on 24 September 1889. Elizabeth Rennick was another prominent suffragist who became a member of the society.

In July of 1894, Annette Bear-Crawford united the Victorian suffrage groups, including the AWSS, under an umbrella organisation called the United Council for Woman Suffrage which coordinate the state's campaign for suffrage. Each of the member groups had representatives on the council.

The society disbanded in 1898, due to Smyth's death. By the time she died, the society was already almost defunct, as she had been focussing more time on her lectures.
