= Annie Lowe =

Australian suffragist (1834–1910)

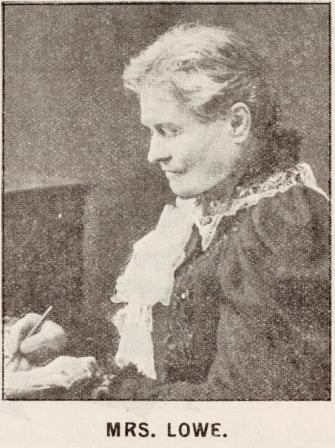
- Born: Ann Hopkins; 12 July 1834; Wilberforce, New South Wales
- Died: 14 April 1910 (aged 75); St Kilda, Victoria, Australia
- Spouse: Josiah Alexander Lowe

Annie Lowe (born Ann Hopkins, 12 July 1834 – 14 April 1910) was a suffragist in Victoria, Australia. She and Henrietta Dugdale founded the Victorian Women's Suffrage Society (the suffragettes) in 1884, the first organisation of this kind to be established in Australia.

== Biography ==
Lowe was born Ann Hopkins, third daughter of Susanna and William Hopkins, in Wilberforce, New South Wales, on 12 July 1834. Her father was involved with establishing universal suffrage for men in New South Wales. She credited her father for her political and social education stating:

"He discussed politics before his boys and girls. We imbibed his broad and liberal views. Boys and girls, we were trained equally. We girls were taught that what was good for the boys was good for us to know."

Lowe married Josiah Alexander Lowe on 17 July 1868 at St Peters in Woolloomooloo, and they later moved to Victoria. In 1884 she helped found the Victorian Women's Suffrage Society. She was known for her public speaking. She lived to see the women of Victoria given the right to vote in 1908, however, she died on 14 April 1910 in St Kilda before she was able to vote in the 1911 state election.

Upon her death The Herald newspaper reported that in Lowe 'will be written in our history as the mother of our suffrage movement'.
