= Victorian Women's Suffrage Society =

Australian women's suffrage organisation

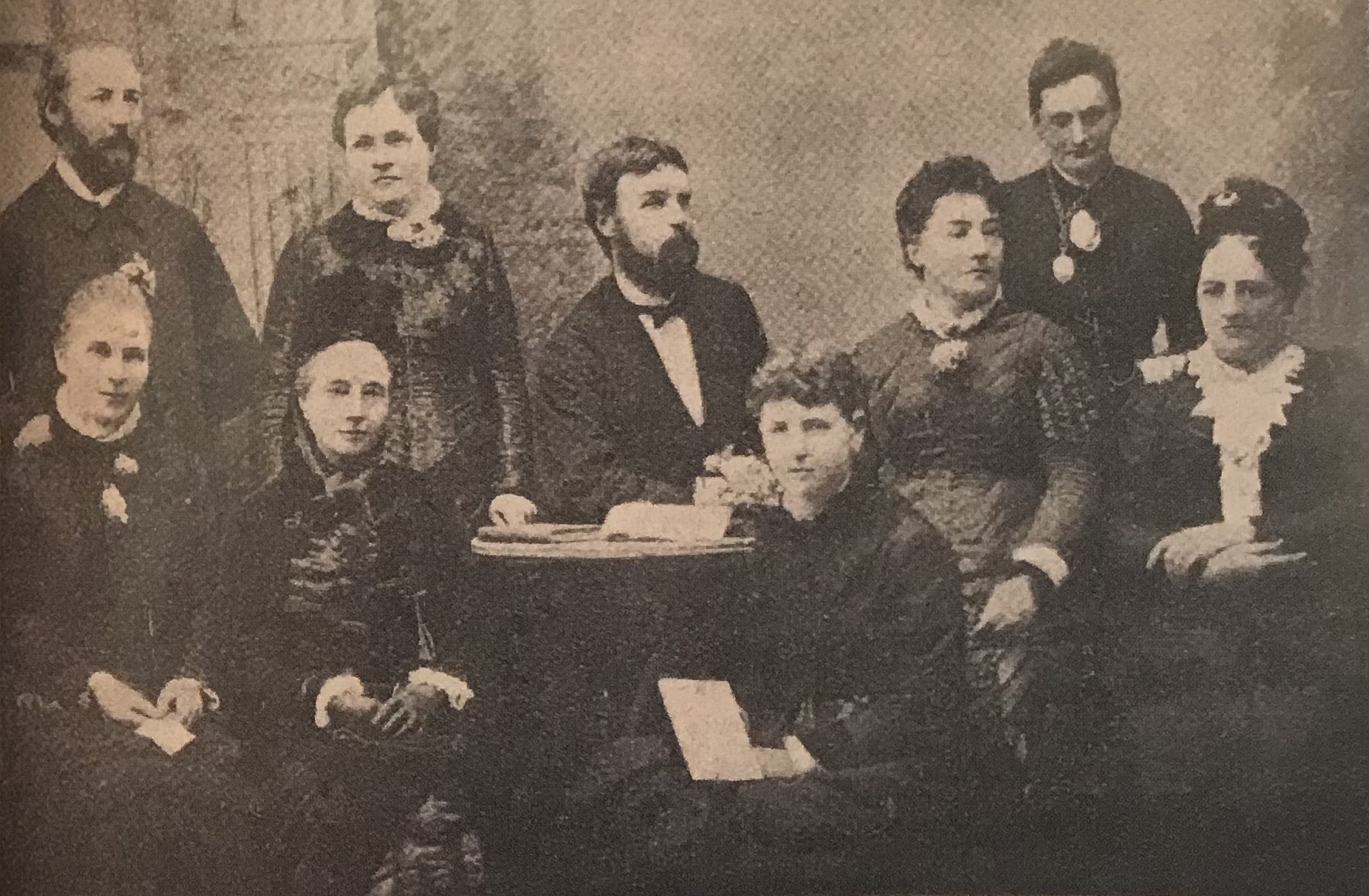
- Executive committee, c. June 1884
- Formation: May 8, 1884; 142 years ago
- Founders: Henrietta Dugdale; Annie Lowe; Elizabeth Rennick
- Founded at: South Yarra, Victoria, Australia
- Dissolved: 1908
- Purpose: activism
- Location: Victoria, Australia
- Secessions: Australian Women's Suffrage Society
- Affiliations: United Council for Woman Suffrage

Victorian Women's Suffrage Society was an Australian organization for women's suffrage, founded in 1884. It organized the struggle for women's suffrage in the State of Victoria in Australia. It was the first women's suffrage society in Australia.

== Formation ==
The organisation was founded by Henrietta Dugdale and Annie Lowe, and Elizabeth Rennick. Dugdale had started the campaign for women's suffrage in 1868, and the campaign was organized with the foundation of the organization. The purpose of the organization was 'To obtain the same political privileges for women as now possessed by male voters'. It was open for both male and female members.

The organisation was founded and named at a meeting in South Yarra on 8 May 1884 chaired by Dugdale. Rennick was appointed secretary and treasurer, and the executive committee included Dugdale and Lowe.

== Activity ==
The Victorian Women's Suffrage Society ran public meetings to formulate resolutions. They engaged with the press, writing letters, distributing literature, and sent deputations to engage with politicians and prominent members of the colony. The primary speakers at their meetings were Dugdale, Lowe and Brettena Smyth. Smyth had joined the organisation and become part on the committee in 1885.

On 29 August 1888, there was a dispute at a meeting of the executive of the society. Smyth, who had recently been elected secretary, and 5 other members of the committee resigned. While the dispute in the meeting stemmed from disagreement regarding the power of the committee to elect a chairperson, it has been speculated that the deeper reasons for the dispute may have related to either the growing influence of movements such as Labor, social purity, and temperance, or may have had to do with the society being unsupportive of Smyth's more radical opinions about women's rights to contraception. In an event, Smyth along with some of the ex-members of the society, formed the Australian Women's Suffrage Society

In the 1890s, the various suffrage groups were united to work together by Annette Bear-Crawford, under the banner of the United Council for Woman Suffrage.

The state of Victoria introduced women's suffrage in 1908, last in Australia.
