= Annie Watson Lister =

Australian suffragist and philanthropist (1866–1928)

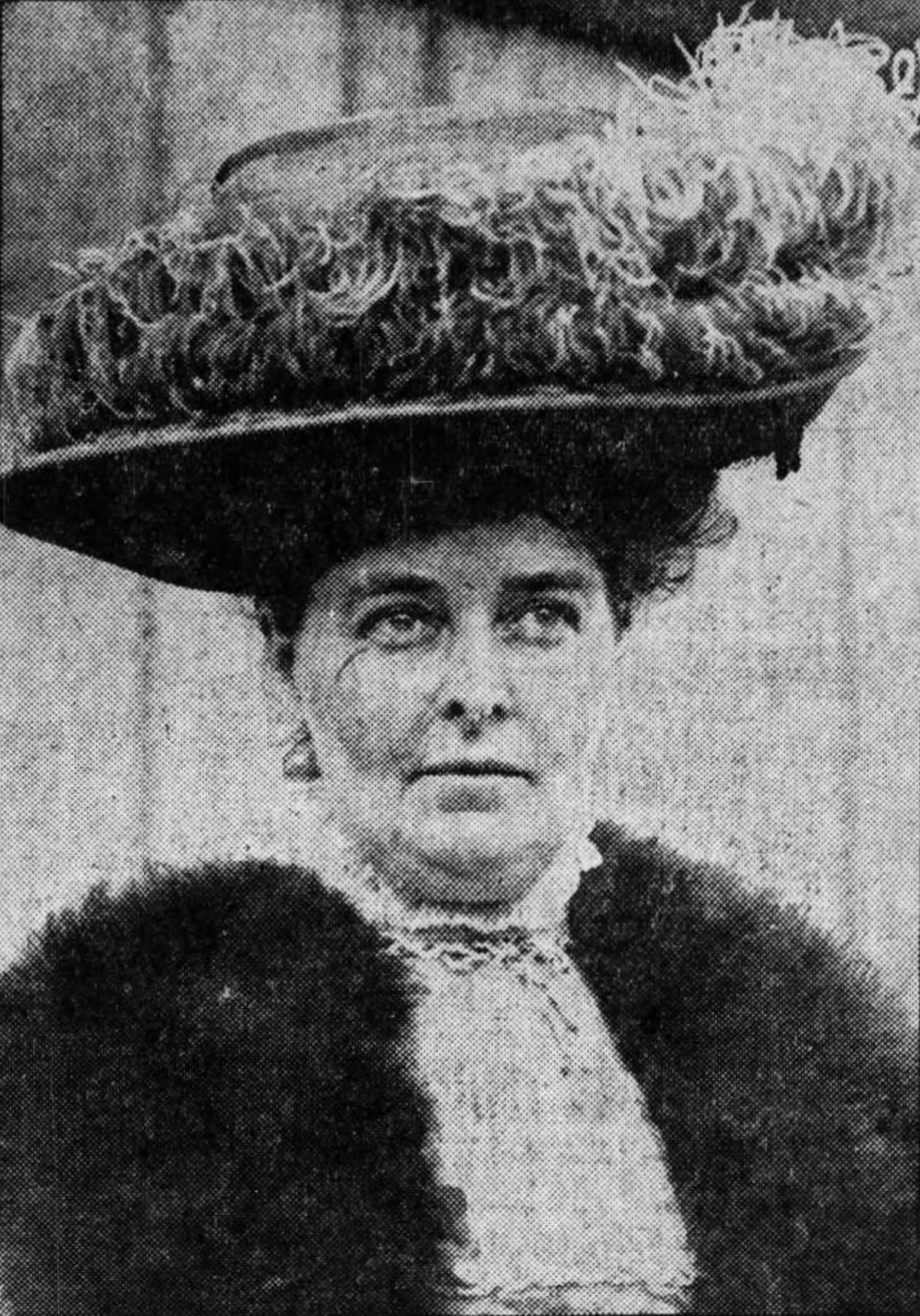
- Watson Lister, 1910
- Born: Annie Fedden; 29 May 1866; Melbourne, Australia
- Died: 15 January 1928 (aged 61); Kew, Victoria, Australia
- Other name: Annie Lister Watson
- Education: Methodist Ladies' College, Melbourne; University of Melbourne
- Movement: Women's suffrage in Victoria
- Board member of: Secretary of National Council of Women of Victoria; Secretary of the Free Kindergarten Union of Victoria; Treasurer of the Australian Business and Professional Women's Club; Vice president of the Women's Automobile Club of Australia; President of Yooralla Hospital School and Free Kindergarten

Annie Watson Lister (born Annie Fedden, 29 May 1866 – 15 January 1928), known in later life as Annie Lister Watson, was an Australian suffragist and philanthropist who took an active role in the women's suffrage movement in Victoria. She was a co-founder and inaugural president of Yooralla Hospital School and Free Kindergarten, secretary of the National Council of Women of Victoria, and secretary of the Free Kindergarten Union of Victoria. She travelled extensively and spent much of her adult life living at her residence Iona in Studley Park, in Kew, Victoria.

== Early life ==
Watson Lister was born Annie Fedden in 1866, in Melbourne to Anne Fedden nee Cowper, and Charles Lister Fedden, an importing merchant. At some time during the 1860s the family changed their surname to Lister, which may have been due to inheritance. Four of her parents' eight children survived to adulthood. The family moved to a two-story property Iona in Studley Park Road, Kew sometime around 1880.

=== Education ===
Watson Lister attended Ormiston Educational Establishment for Young Ladies, and the Methodist Ladies' College, where she was the dux of the school in 1883. She was a member of the Old Collegians Association. She graduated from Melbourne University with a Bachelor of Arts in 1891. She was one of the founding members of the Princess Ida club.

=== Personal life ===
She married Philip Sidney Watson on 12 February 1898 in Studley Park. She chose to take the double barreled name Watson Lister as her last name, which went against custom of the time, and spoke to her feminist independence. After a decade or so, she had changed it to the Lister Watson. Watson Lister and her husband, who went by his middle name Sidney, became Christian Scientists, with Sidney becoming a Christian Science practitioner in 1905. When living in Australia in the early 1900s, Watson Lister lived in Woodend, Victoria at a property called ‘Atlin’. In 1904 Watson Lister moved with Sidney into her late mother's residence Iona at Studley Park, in Kew, Victoria.

== Career ==
=== Suffrage movement in the 1890s ===
Watson Lister was active in the women's suffrage movement in Victoria, working alongside Vida Goldstein and Alice Henry. In 1891, Watson Lister signed the Monster Petition for women's suffrage which was presented to the Parliament of Victoria, showing that nearly 30,000 women of Victoria signed their name in support of having voting rights. In 1893, on the recommendation of Annette Bear-Crawford, she wrote two letters to Millicent Fawcett from the Women's suffrage movement in the United Kingdom. The first letter, written in May, asked for advice on creating a new suffrage society. Her second letter, written in September, suggests that Fawcett had responded to the first with recommendations on literature, and the advice to keep the suffrage society's purpose pure and simple. Watson Lister stated in the second letter that they were close to creating the new society.

In March 1894 Watson Lawson was elected to the committee of the newly formed Victorian Women's Franchise League which had been formed by members of the Women's Christian Temperance Union of Victoria. Her first known public speech on suffrage was on 19 October 1895 at the Collingwood Town Hall. In 1896 she was elected to the committee of the shilling fund for the Queen Victoria Hospital, Melbourne.

Watson Lister was a member of the Warrawee club, on Russell Street in Melbourne, which was a place for working women to meet. Other members of the club were Annette Bear-Crawford, Isabella Goldstein, and Alice Henry.

=== Canadian Klondike goldfields ===
In January 1898 Watson Lister and Sidney travelled to the Klondike goldfields. People travelling to the goldfields were required to take enough provisions to support themselves for a year. She was a restaurant proprietor at Teslin Lake in 1898, and in Pine City in 1899. She returned to Australia with her husband in December 1899.

=== National Council of Women Victoria ===
Watson Lister resumed her work with the suffrage movement, when delivering lectures in Melbourne, she would travel to Kew with her pony and trap, and stay with her mother. In 1902, Lady Janet Clarke called a meeting to establish the National Council of Women of Victoria. Watson Lister attended, and was elected on the inaugural council. She was later elected honorary secretary.

On the 29th of September 1903, a farewell gathering was held for Watson Lister at the Austral Salon, with Janet Clarke, and Annie Lowe presiding. The following week, Watson Lister would embark on a voyage to the United States of America and Europe to further her knowledge regarding women's issues, and to attend the Woman's congress in Berlin as a representative of the National Council of Women of Victoria. On the trip she also represented the Women's Writers Club, and sent information back to them. In February 1904, she attended the 36th Annual Convention of the National American Women Suffrage Association in Washington, D.C. as a representative of the National Council of Women of Victoria. She was invited to give a speech, in which she spoke about the comparisons between the USA, Australia and New Zealand's suffrage movements, and praised the American leaders Susan B Anthony, Lucy Stone, and Elizabeth Cady Stanton. She also spoke about the Woman's Anti-Suffrage League of Victoria, stating it was formed by "two of our leading manufacturers, who hid behind their daughters", stating they had spent large sums of money to set up offices to facilitate their petition, of which she claimed used corrupt methods to garner false signatures. She then travelled to Boston where she was a guest at the home of William Lloyd Garrison, and spoke at a reception for colonel Thomas Wentworth Higginson and was preparing to travel to Berlin for the congress. However, before arriving at the Congress she received a telegram that her mother was unwell, so she was unable to attend. Her mother died on 29 April 1904 from paralysis, which sparked a court case over the interpretation of her, and her late husband's wills.

=== Kindergarten Movement ===
Watson Lister was involved in the Kindergarten movement in Victoria. In April 1908, she hosted 127 children from the recently opened Collingwood Free Kindergarten at her Iona residence, where she and Sidney entertained them for the day. At the end of 1908, several meeting were held in regards to free kindergartens, with Victorian philanthropists and the four existing free kindergartens in Victoria, and it was decided that they should form the Free Kindergarten Union of Victoria. Watson Lister was the inaugural secretary of the Free Kindergarten Union of Victoria, with Pattie Deakin elected president. She continued working on the union's council and executive committee for the next 20 years.

=== Philanthropy and other activities ===
In December 1905 Watson Lister was elected as the assistant secretary of the National Australian Women’s Political Association, with Vida Goldstein as president; vice-presidents, Catherine Spence, Rose Scott, Charlotte Eleanor Trundle, and Ida McAuley; Treasurer, Miss Golding; and secretary Jessie Rooke.

In 1918 Watson Lister worked with Sister Faith (Evangeline Ireland), and Sister Eva to set up the Yooralla Hospital School and Free Kindergarten for children with disabilities. She was the President of Yooralla until her death 10 years later.

Watson Lister, and Alice Anderson were two of the inaugural vice presidents of the Women's Automobile Club of Australia, when it was founded in 1918, and she was a founding member and Treasurer of the Australian Business and Professional Women's Club. She was involved in the British Union for the Abolition of Vivisection, holding a meeting of up to 100 people for the Melbourne branch.

In June 1910, Watson Lister gave a speech in Boston to the Massachusetts Woman Suffrage Association, and the Boston Equal Suffrage Association for Good Government. She spoke about the positive effects of women gaining the vote in Australia, and stated that it had not inherently changed women themselves. Instead, she said, the suffrage leagues "burned their literature and petitions, disbanded and returned to their quiet lives as home-keeping people."

== Death and legacy ==
Watson Lister died suddenly at her home in Kew, Victoria on 15 January 1928. She was buried at the Melbourne General Cemetery.

A tribute in The Herald stated that her death cast a gloom over her friends at the Lyceum club, and reported on her generous nature.

She left her estate to her family and friends, including £200 to her good friend Stella Miles Franklin, and she also left £100 to the Yooralla Free Kindergarten, Carlton in her will.
