= Women's suffrage in Victoria =

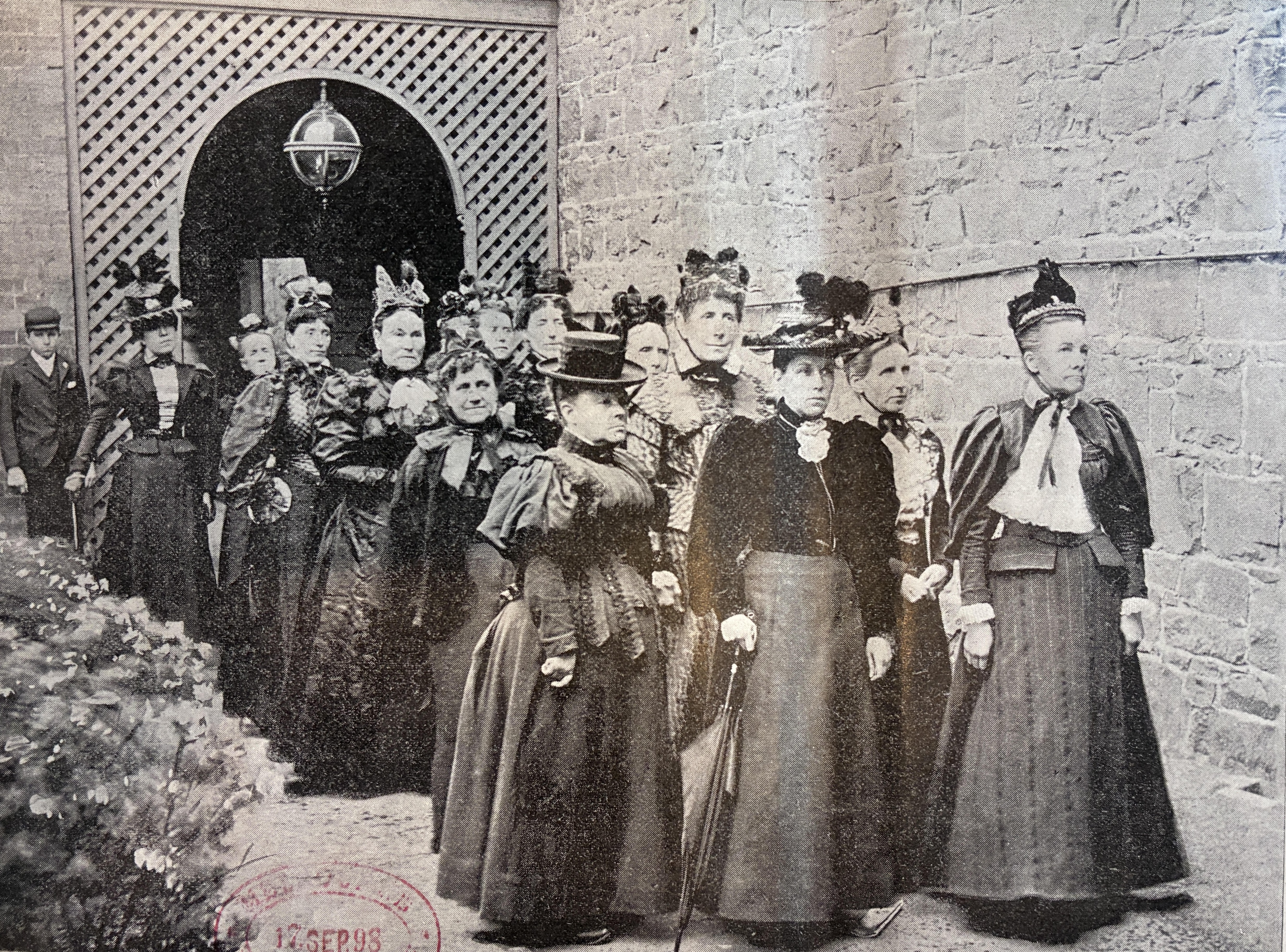
Women's Suffrage deputation to the Legislative Council of Victoria, Australia, 6 September 1898

Women's suffrage in Victoria, when women gained the right to vote in the state, was the result of many years of campaigning before Federation of Australia in the Colony of Victoria, and for eight years after in the State of Victoria. It was connected to the wider push for Women's suffrage in Australia. And yet while Victoria's campaign started earlier than other states, early lobbying culminated in the formation of Australia's first suffrage group, the Victorian Women's Suffrage Society (VWSS) in 1884, it was the last to grant state suffrage to women in 1908.

Decades before the formation of the VWSS, women landowners, such as Fanny Finch in the colony identified that they were technically enfranchised in local election through their status as rate payers and attempted to lodge their votes. However, they were blocked from exercising this right by electoral administrators. In 1865 the legislators in the Colony removed the technicality by changing the language of legislation to explicitly exclude women from the vote. It would take another 43 years, of women agitating and campaigning before white women of Victoria were allowed to vote in state elections. Furthermore, it would take would take another 40 years, when federal legislation changed in 1949, for those voting rights to be extended to Aboriginal people.

As the turn of the century drew closer, the suffrage campaigning picked up, with more suffrage groups forming, such as the Australian Women's Suffrage Society and other groups with broader agendas, such as the Woman's Christian Temperance Union of Victoria (WCTU), deciding to focus on the cause. In 1891 the groups worked together to canvass for women's signatures, with the resulting Monster Petition of nearly 30,000 signatures being presented to Victorian Parliament, which eliminated the myth that only a fringe group of women wanted to have the vote. The suffrage groups coordinated their campaigning in 1894 by creating the United Council for Woman Suffrage, led by Annette Bear-Crawford. After Bear-Crawford's unexpected death in 1899, Vida Goldstein took up the leadership of the movement.

The legislative Bill that finally passed through Victorian Parliament successfully in 1908 was the 19th that had been brought forward. The first had been put forward 20 years earlier by William Maloney in 1889.

== Suffrage movement in Victoria ==
=== Years prior to 1884 ===
==== Early suffragists ====
When the Victorian gold rush began, European immigrant women had hopes that Victoria would be a more liberated environment for women. Women who were present on the goldfields in the 1850s stated it required self-sufficiency to survive, and as such the required independence to write their own rules. The egalitarian spirit of the time allowed people to set aside social gradations, which resulted in political and social inclusiveness, and allowed women a freedom that they were unable to achieve in many other places, leading to them being very involved in the political activism to resist the colonial authorities. Ellen Young, an English poet who arrived in Ballarat in February of 1854, had her first poem published in the Geelong Advertiser of that same year. Her poems were controversial for her time with Protofeminist and political themes that questioned the establishment. In one letter to the papers she stated “We, the people, demand cheap land, just magistrates, to be represented in the Legislative Council, in fact treated as the free subjects of a great nation”. Another woman from the goldfields, Fanny Smith, wrote to the Ballarat Times in 1856 asking whether women with 'Miner's Right' were eligible to be elected as part of the local court just like men. Smith said she had read the legislation and it was 'silent on sex'. Henrietta Dugdale is usually credited as being the first woman to publicly call for women's suffrage when she wrote to the Argus in 1869. Other women such as Helen Hart and Caroline Dexter would deliver public lectures, and write to the press on women's rights and suffrage.

==== First women to attempt to cast votes ====
The Municipal Institutions Act 1854 (18 Vict. No. 15) stated that 'all persons' who paid rates had the right to vote in municipal elections, which meant that women were not explicitly excluded. In 1856, two rate payers, Fanny Finch, an English-born business woman with African ancestry, and an unknown female friend cast their votes at a Castlemaine election. Later that afternoon the assessors disallowed the women's votes stating "they (the women) had no right to vote".

==== Early legislation ====
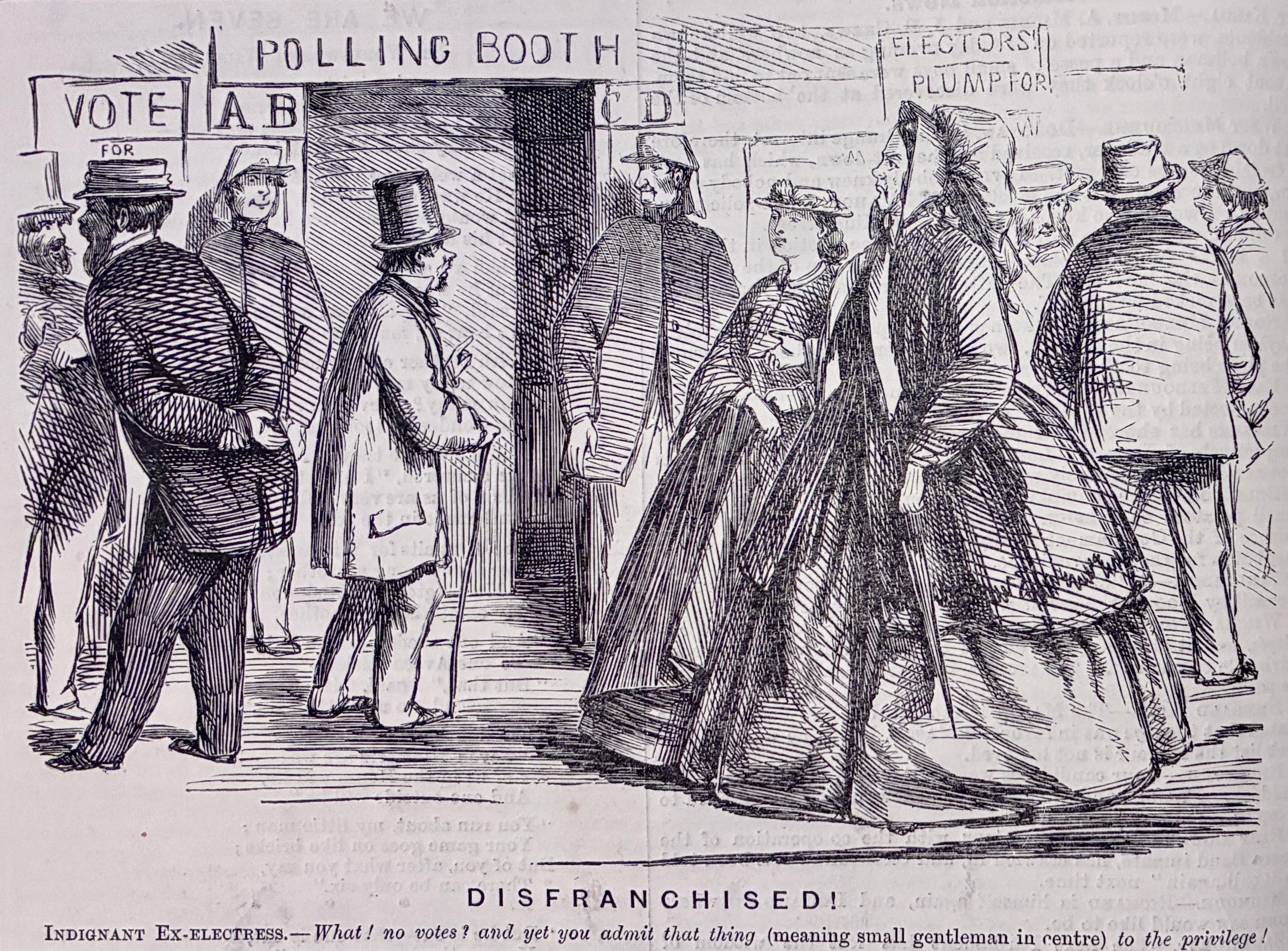
1866 Melbourne Punch comic, women disfranchised

In 1865, when the Victorian Assembly were making amendments to the Municipal Act, John Dane moved that the wording of the act should be changed from 'all persons' to 'all male persons' to exclude women from voting, and that any women's names on the state electoral roll should be expunged. The debate that followed was the first debate on women's suffrage in the Victorian parliament. While there was some support for women voting, the motion was passed. The motion was supported by George Higinbotham who would later support women's suffrage, however he stated that granting women suffrage should be deliberate, not inadvertent.

Women who held 'high positions' in the colony lobbied John Richardson, who subsequently attempt to restore women ratepayers suffrage when a bill to redistribute electorates was being passed through parliament in 1873. Higinbotham supported the motion, and after it passed by two votes. So Higginbotham moved that all adult women be allowed to vote, but this was defeated.

=== Years 1884 to 1894 ===
==== Formation of suffrage organisations ====
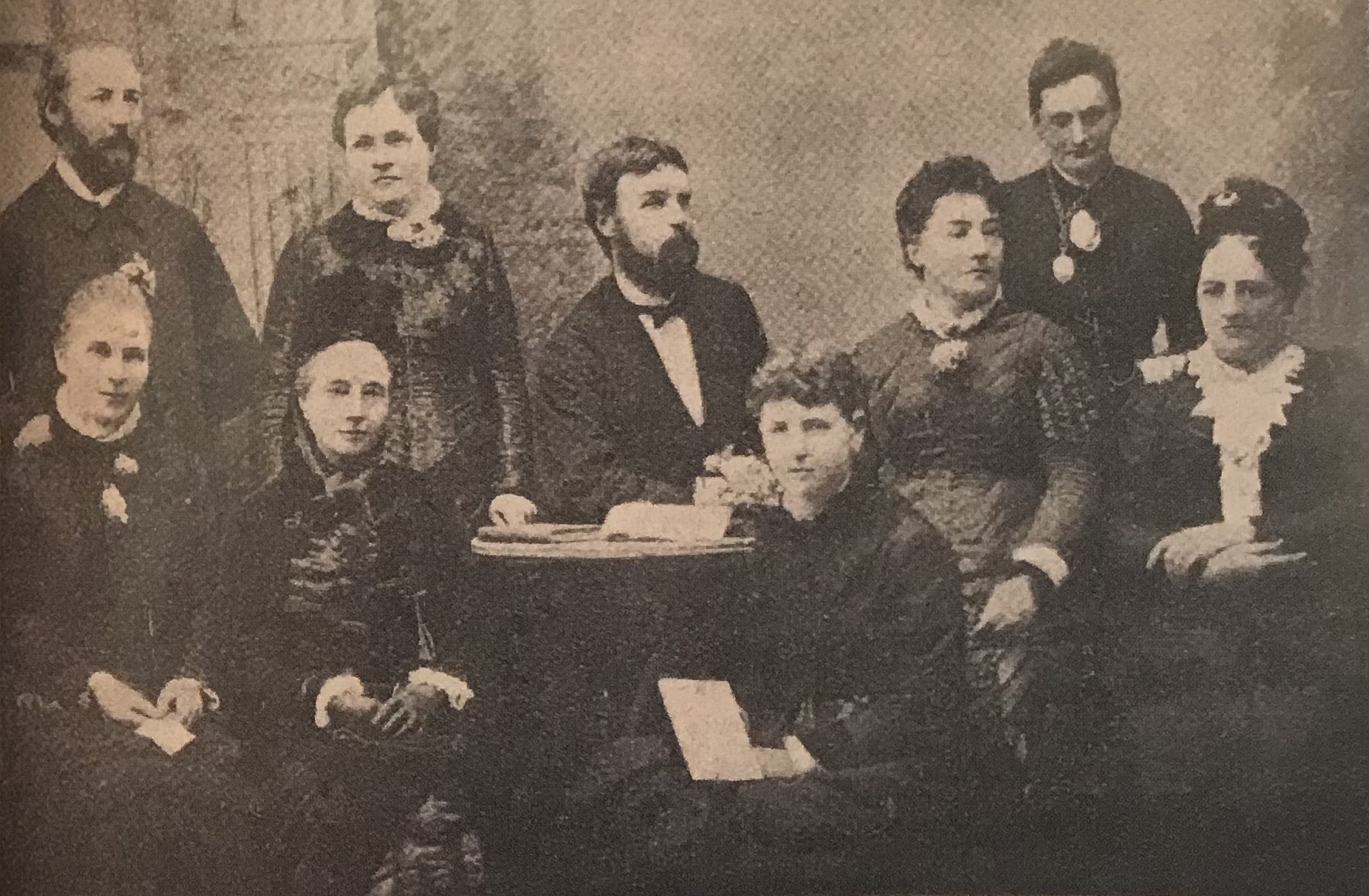
The Victorian Women's Suffrage Society, executive committee, c. June 1884

The Victorian Women's Suffrage Society was formed on 25 May 1884 by Annie Lowe and Henrietta Dugdale at the house of Elizabeth Rennick. It was a group of twenty women, and a number of men, and they formed a committee and drew up a constitution and called the organisation the Victorian Women's Suffrage Society. They called a general meeting for the 22 June. While the participants were united in agreeing that women should have the vote, there were a variety of opinions about why and how. One clergyman in attendance, Reverend Dr Brumby, believed that women would hold the same opinions as their husbands, and married men deserved a double vote because they held a greater stake in the country than single men. Another participant, Mrs Webster, suggested the organisation should focus on getting women ratepayers the vote, as they would have more chance of success. Another still, Mr Black, raised concerns that women's suffrage would provide courtesan's with the vote. Lowe and Dugdale both stated that women needed to be enfranchised, so they could have greater protection from violence. At that time, violent offences against women brought a lesser sentences than property offences.

Up until August 1888, Brettena Smyth was an active member of the Victorian Women's Suffrage Society, she was elected as secretary in July of that year, however, soon after there was a disagreement within the organisation, leading to her and five committee members to resign. Smyth soon formed her own suffrage organisation the Australian Women's Suffrage Society. Smyth's views on women's rights were considered more radical than many other suffragists. She believed the biggest problem for women was that they did not have the rights to choose when they had children. Smyth was an advocate for contraception, which she sold in her general store.

In 1885 an American Woman's Christian Temperance Union missionary Mary Clement Leavitt travelled to Australia to promote the Temperance Movement. She founded local unions around Victoria. In 1887, Marie Elizabeth Kirk and the Reverend Philip Moses founded a central organisation, the Woman's Christian Temperance Union of Victoria (WCTU). Mary M. Love became the first president of the organisation. The organisation's primary focus was on promoting abstinence of alcohol and wished to change the legislation to put controls on the sale of alcohol, so by 1890 they adopted a resolution that as men and women both have to obey laws, they both should be able to elect those who make the laws. The resolution said women's votes would safeguard the home, and women's interests, and this would be good for the whole population.

==== The Monster Petition of 1891 ====
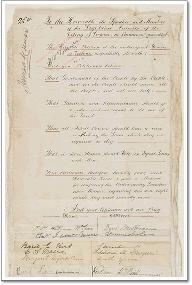
The Victorian Women's Suffrage Petition, held at the Public Records Office Victoria

With their resolution to seek women's suffrage, in 1891, when the Victorian Parliament had their next sitting, the WCTU collaborated with the Victorian Temperance Alliance and sent a deputation to James Munro the Premier of Victoria to urge him to introduce legislation for women's suffrage. Munro, an advocate for the temperance movement, agreed only to raise it with his cabinet, and said they would need to provide a united front to agitate for successful suffrage legislation. Taking his advice, the WCTU approached the two other main suffrage organisations, the Victorian Women's Suffrage Society, and the Australian Women's Suffrage Society, who agreed to work together to gather women's signatures for a suffrage petition. For six months the groups sent out canvassers to go door to door in Melbourne, and in the suburbs and towns of Victoria. They gathered nearly 30,000 signatures of Victorian women. The pages were glued to a 260 metre long piece of material, and rolled onto a cardboard spindle. When it was presented to parliament in support of a suffrage bill, it needed several attendants to carry it. It was nicknamed the 'Monster Petition'. The suffrage bill was attached to a bill intending to abolish plural voting. While it passed the Victorian Legislative Assembly, Munro was pressured by his supporters to drop Women's Suffrage from the bill to give the abolishment of plural voting more chance of passing in the Victorian Legislative Council. The bill did not pass anyway. While the suffrage groups were disappointed, the petition had a lasting impact on the suffrage movement. There was now clear evidence that calls for women's suffrage were not just from a small group of radical women. A large proportion of Victorian women wanted to be able to vote.

=== Years 1894 to 1904 ===
==== Suffrage organisations uniting ====
Annette Bear-Crawford, a Victorian born suffragist who had recently returned from her schooling, and early career as a social worker in England, identified that the various suffrage groups needed to unite to achieve their goal. She organised the formation of the United Council for Woman Suffrage, an umbrella organisation with representatives from each group, which could direct the suffrage campaign. Bear-Crawford had the ability to bring the different personalities together on common ground. Vida Goldstein credited Bear-Crawford as a mentor who taught her how to speak confidently on the public stage. Bear-Crawford also recognised that another suffrage organisation was required. Each of the major suffrage groups had broader agendas which were alienating people who wanted to only support suffrage. The WCTU was focussed on restricting alcohol; The Victorian Women's Suffrage Society hoped for broader reforms in women's rights, and was led by women who had reputations for being radical, such as Dugdale who even made and wore her own trousers; and the Australian Women's Suffrage Society actively promoted contraception, which at that time were considered extreme and sinful. So, at a meeting of the WCTU, Bear-Crawford organised the formation of the Victorian Women's Suffrage League, an organisation with only one agenda, women's suffrage.

==== Leadership change ====
In the late 1890s two significant people in the suffrage movement died, first Smyth of the Australian Women's Suffrage Society died of Brights disease in February 1898. They society had by this time been largely defunct, as she had been focussing primarily on her lecture tours. She had another tour planned before she fell ill.

In November of 1898 Bear-Crawford had travelled to London to attend the 1899 International Congress of Women. Goldstein and Ina Higgins agreed to run the UCSS while she was away. However, while she was there she caught pneumonia and died in June of 1899, at 46 years of age. This was a blow to the suffrage movement in Victoria. A memorial service for Bear-Crawford was held at St Paul's Cathedral, Melbourne, on the 4th of July, which was the first time such a service was held for a woman in Melbourne.

Goldstein became the successor as the secretary of the UCSS, despite some members concerns that she was too radical. However, Goldstein soon became the leader of the movement, as she was excellent at public speaking, engaging the press, and audiences responded well to her wit, dignity, and ability to command respect from even those who disagreed with her. During her tenure as secretary, of the UNSS Goldstein expanded its membership, and by 1900 it had 32 affiliated organisations. From 1900, Goldstein was paid to work in this role fulltime.

In September 1900, Goldstein launched the Australian Woman's Sphere newspaper, which reported on the suffrage cause.

==== Anti-suffrage petition ====
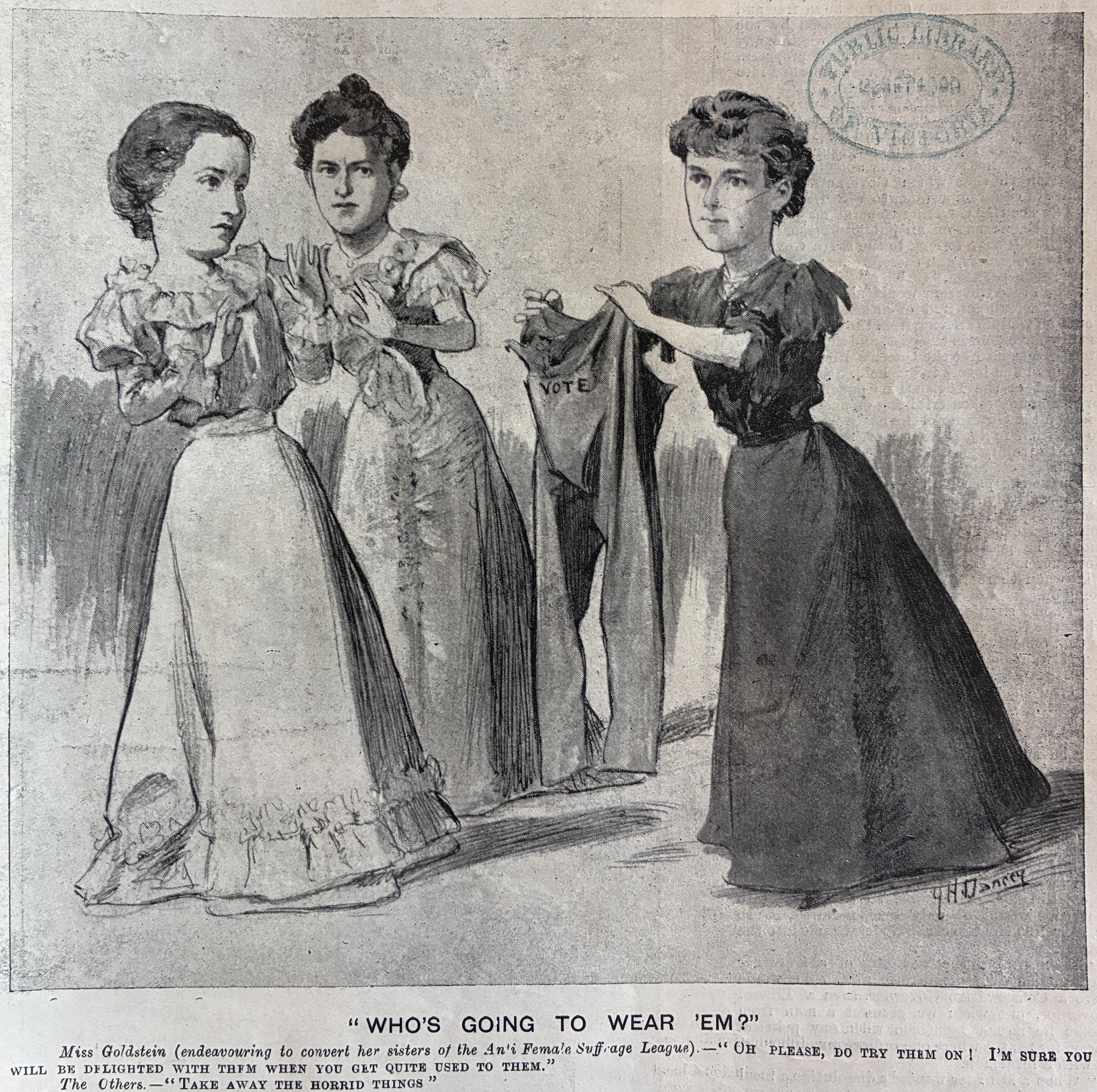
Cartoon of Anti-suffrage league and Vida Goldstein by George Dancey in the Melbourne Punch in 1900

In July 1900, the Women's Anti-Franchise League of Victoria was founded by Carrie M. Reid, and Freda Derham when they wrote to The Argus saying they did not wish to have the vote. They argued that while the 1891 Monster Petition had many signatures, it was unclear how many women chose not to sign and did not want to have the vote. Reid and Derham referred to themselves as 'Victoria's girls', and suggested that as a younger generation of women they had fresher ideas that were more in-step with most of the population.

A public meeting in August had a good attendance, but women present did not wish to lead the proceedings, preferring to defer to the men present, which included several members of parliament, including both Reid and Derham's fathers, Robert Reid and Frederick Derham who were conservative members of the Victorian Legislative Assembly. Colonel Jacob Goldstein, the father of Vida Goldstein, and the husband of Isabella Goldstein, was present and was invited to chair the meeting. Goldstein's public involvement in the anti-suffrage movement was the last straw for his already strained relationship with Isabella, and they began living separately. The meeting passed motions stating it would be against nature and God for women to have the vote, and it would therefore would degrade women.

Vida Goldstein challenged Reid and Derham to public debates, but they declined stating they were not organised to do so, they were only focussed on the petition. The Argus stated they were choosing not to enter into debate because it was outside of their concept of the 'woman's sphere'. The Age responded that by collecting signatures they were already in the public sphere, and by seeking signatures were encouraging women 'to do the very thing which they tell them they are incapable of doing.'

The petition that the group presented to parliament on 16 September 1900 contained 22,978 signatures. The signature canvassers were accused of using disingenuous methods to gain signatures, with biased questioning, and there were reports that factory employers were pressuring women employees to sign. However, Coady stated that the signatures were attributed to many addresses from all around Victoria, and points out that there would have been more outrage if there were any large scale subterfuge. Coady also states that it was likely Reid and Derham were aided in the canvassing by Robert Walpole, who would later become an organising secretary of the Victorian Employer's Federation, who had experience canvassing the state in relation to Federation.

The day the petition was presented to the Victorian Legislative Council, and they subsequently voted against the suffrage bill, Jacob Goldstein and Vida Goldstein watched on from the Visitor's Gallery, sitting side by side. After the bill was defeated, the Anti-Franchise League refused to engage in debate with the suffragists, and the organisation disappeared entirely in the following months. Vida Goldstein later stated that there is no better aid to Women's Suffrage than an anti-suffrage league.

A few years after the group disbanded, Frederick Derham requested that Janet, Lady Clarke mobilised the signatories of the anti-suffrage petition to form a group. This group would become the Australian Women's National League.

==== Federal voting rights: the Commonwealth Franchise Act 1902 ====
In 1902, the Commonwealth Franchise Act 1902 was passed, giving women the right to vote in federal elections. Even though women's suffrage had been granted at a federal level, conservatives were still primarily concerned about them winning the vote on a state level, because state parliament had the purview of issues that were particularly important to the elite: land, business and finance.

=== Years 1904 to 1908 ===
In 1904, Thomas Bent, a known opponent of women's suffrage became the premier of Victoria, and began a campaign of blocking the suffrage movement. Bent and his Liberal and Conservative supporters feared that women would vote for the Victorian Labor Party. He blamed the newly enfranchised Australian women for the Australian Labor Party’s victory in the 1903 Federal Election. In November of 1904, Bent refused to receive a deputation from the UCSS stating he had no time for them.

Goldstein, now working outside the UCSS grew frustrated with them and announced in January of 1905:

"The Council accomplished nothing last year; there is no evidence that there is likely to be any vitality this year, and I for one am not willing to let this policy of drift continue. The U.C.S.S. having been given every opportunity to lead the suffrage army, has failed."

She then proposed that her own organisation, the Women's Political Association, would now focus more on leading the suffrage movement. While the Women's Political Association did step up as an effective suffrage organisation, it did not take over, and worked with the other organisations, including the UCSS, by this time represented by their president Annie Lowe. Bent was arrogant, stubborn, and held contempt for the suffrage movement, and actively focused on blocking their lobbying. He and his government would continue to block suffrage legislation, until 1908.

In 1907, the 36 suffragists from 18 organisations met at the WCTU headquarters and formed a new organisation called the Woman Suffrage Declaration Committee.

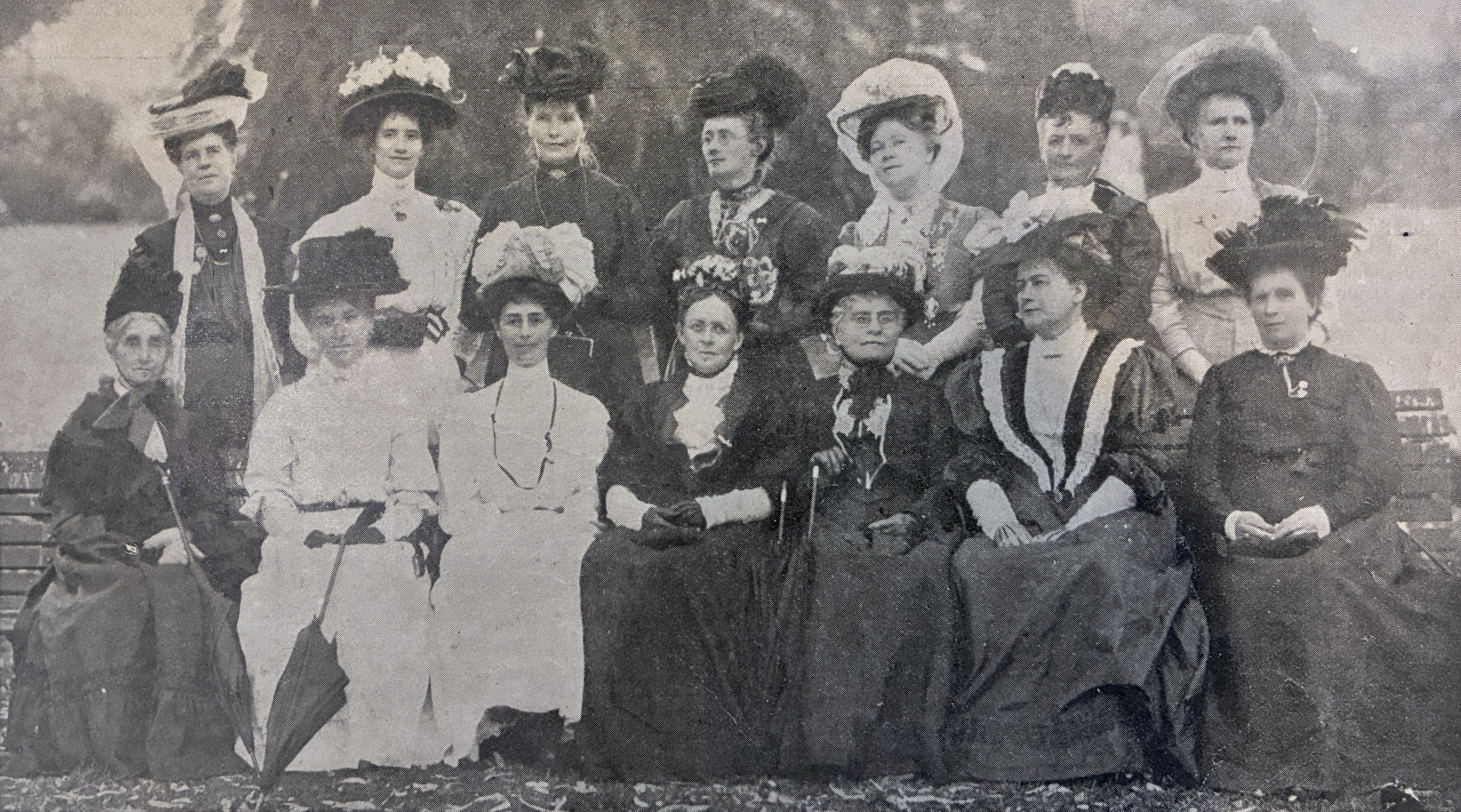
Victorian Suffrage Declaration Committee, commemorative photograph 1908

==== The Adult Suffrage Act 1908 ====
In 1908, a bill was finally passed as the Adult Suffrage Act 1908 (No. 2185) The leaders of the suffrage movements had their photograph taken on 5 December in the Botanic gardens and then two days later threw a victory celebration called a Commemoration Conversazione which had a large attendance. The bill that passed was the 19th women's suffrage bill presented to the Victorian Parliament. The first was 20 years earlier, put forward by William Maloney in 1889.

== Intersectional factors in women's suffrage ==
=== Debates of class, race and womanhood ===
Many of the debates regarding women's suffrage focus on perceptions of womanhood, class, and race. The parliamentary debates were embedded in western white discourse. The assumptions of both sides of the debate drew on western assumptions of women and womanhood. The anti-suffrage debates focussed on how suffrage would 'unsex' woman, go against the perception of natural gender roles, and make women become more manly. The pro-suffragists presented the voting woman as the ideal of a refined white woman of the Victorian era. One politician stated that women improved men, adding "If men got away from womankind they would develop the habits of blackfellows, and the would gradually become brutes." Many conservatives were also fearful of working women having the vote. At the turn of the century, nearly a quarter of the population of women over the age of 15 were in the workforce.

The suffrage organisations tended to represent white middleclass women, and they denoted white womanhood as respectable with ideals of temperance, industriousness refined Victorian sexual morals and manners. This construct of womanhood was deliberately projected by the suffrage campaigns as a representation of all women irrespective of class or race.

=== Victorian Aboriginal women's suffrage ===
The Adult Suffrage Act 1908 did not explicitly place restrictions on voting according to race. However, as Victoria was now a state under the new Federation of Australia, federal decisions impacted state decisions. It was through this roundabout way that Victorian Aboriginal peoples were excluded from voting in both state and federal elections after federation. From the start of the invasion until the federation of Australia, the Aboriginal peoples of Victoria had been greatly reduced due to frontier wars and violence, and introduced disease. Aboriginal peoples in Victoria at this time had few civil rights, and were an impoverished minority, and therefore they did not pose a significant political threat to the status quo. There is some anecdotal evidence that a small number of Aboriginal men were on the electoral roll, and cast votes before federation, as they were legally enfranchised to do so if they were property holders. It does not seem that the Victorian politicians had any great concerns about this. During the writing of the Australian constitution, in the lead up to federation, there was discussion about having universal suffrage for adults, without race or gender restrictions. Immigration policies, known as the White Australia policies had already been established to ensure that only white people could enter the country. However, Western Australia and Queensland had large populations of Indigenous Australians, and argued that that they could have a significant impact on voting if allowed to vote. The south eastern states were persuaded by these arguments and voted in favour of a racial restriction. The clause read "No aboriginal native of Australia, Asia or the islands of the Pacific, except New Zealand, shall be entitled to have his name place on the electoral role, unless so entitles under Section 41 of the Constitution." Section 41 supposedly enshrined the rights of those eligible to vote in state elections, to also vote in the federal elections. However, in practice, administrators interpreted Section 41 as not allowing Victorian Aboriginal peoples to vote in federal elections. Furthermore, because the state electoral rolls were used as a basis for the federal electoral rolls, and because electoral officials held the perception they were not eligible to be on the federal roll, they believed Victorian Aboriginal peoples could not be put on the state rolls. This was how things stood until 1949 when Prime Minister Ben Chifley's government changed legislation for Aboriginal people from south eastern states to be able to vote in federal elections. This in turn should have lowered the unofficial administrative barriers preventing them voting in Victorian state elections. However, it was not until the success of the 1967 referendum that many Victorian Aboriginal people became aware that they now had the right to vote.

== Legacy and honours ==
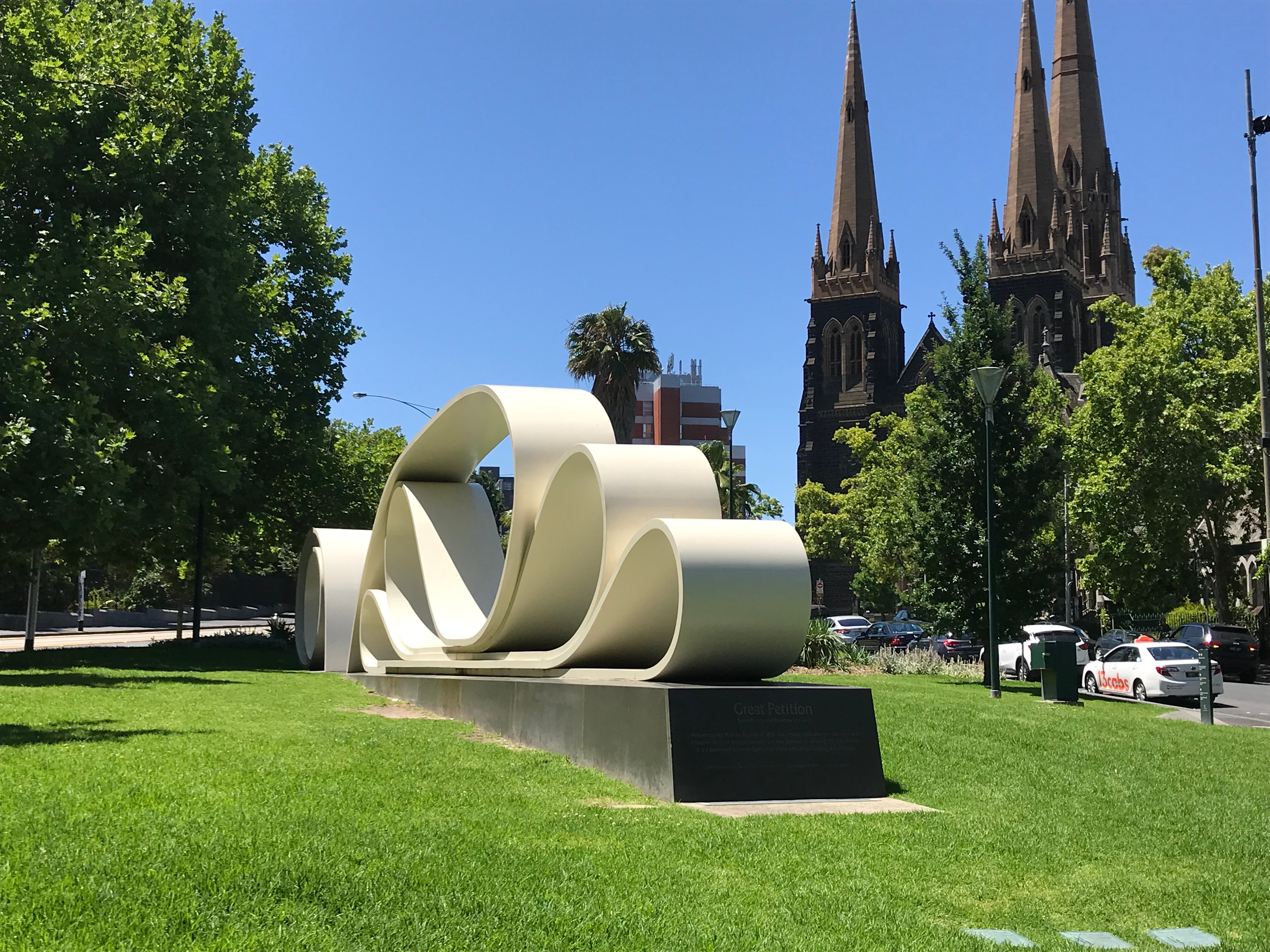
The Great Petition Sculpture

On 3 December 2008, the Victorian Government, Arts Victoria, and the City of Melbourne commemorated 100 years of women's suffrage in Victoria by launching a monument called the Great Petition. It was created by Susan Hewitt and Penelope Lee, and is located at the Burston Reserve, near Parliament House. It contains a didactic panel with a history of the women's suffrage movement in Victoria written by Marilyn Lake.

On 13 March 1995, on the 139th anniversary of Labour day, Joan Kirner dedicated a memorial at Brettena Smyth's unmarked grave at Melbourne General Cemetery. At the suggestion of Helen D. Harris, the Labour Historical Graves Committee had organised the bluestone grave and headstone, created by stonemason Andrew Patience, and funded by the CFMEU. It was the first time a woman was honoured by the Committee.

In 1978, a street in the Canberra suburb of Chisholm was named Goldstein Crescent, honouring Vida Goldstein work as a social reformer.

A street in the Canberra suburb of Cook is named for Henrietta Dugdale.

In 1984, the Division of Goldstein, a federal electorate in Melbourne was named after her. Seats in her honour have been installed in the Parliament House Gardens in Melbourne, and in Portland, Victoria.

A number of suffragists have been inducted onto the Victorian Honour Roll of Women including: Vide Goldstein, and Henrietta Dugdale, in 2001. Annette Bear-Crawford in 2007.
