= Elizabeth Laurie Rees =

Temperance activist and social reformer (1865–1939)

- Born: Elizabeth Laurie Johnston; 18 December 1865; London, England
- Died: 19 March 1939 (aged 73); Auburn, Victoria, Australia
- Occupation: Temperance advocate
- Years active: 1913–1939
- Known for: leader in Australia's Woman's Christian Temperance Union
- Spouse: Evan Rees (m. 1892; died 1935)
- Children: 5

Elizabeth Laurie Rees (née Johnston; 1865–1939) was an English-born Australian temperance and women's rights activist. She was a key leader in the Woman's Christian Temperance Union of Victoria, serving twenty years as the general secretary. She also served in a variety of leadership roles for the national Australian WCTU, including treasurer, corresponding secretary, and national president. She was the inaugural editor of the national WCTU magazine, White Ribbon Signal.

A devoted Baptist, she co-founded the Victorian Baptist Women's Association with Cecilia Downing in 1925. In 1928, as president of the Victorian Baptist Women's Association, she attended the World Baptist Congress in Toronto, Canada, and was the only woman to lead devotions at the event. In 1935, Rees was awarded the King George V Silver Jubilee Medal for her work on temperance.

== Early life and education ==
Elizabeth Laurie Johnston was born on 18 December 1865 in London, England. Known by the nickname "Bessie", she was the daughter of Margaret (née Kirkcaldy) and Thomas Johnston. Her father was originally from Edinburgh, Scotland; at the time of Bessie's birth, he worked in England as a coach maker. When automobiles began to be used, he switched to building automobiles. Thomas and Margaret Johnston moved their family of three, John, Elizabeth and Anne Grey, to Australia in late 1870 aboard the Essex, arriving in Melbourne on 26 January 1871. A fourth child, Andrew Essex, was born en route to Australia. The family first lived in Castlemaine, Victoria, when Bessie was about four years old, and then to Hay, N.S.W. when Thomas' work with Cobb & Co was transferred. Bessie was the second oldest of seven children in the family, with her remaining three siblings, Jane Victoria, William Robert and Thomas Lyttleton, being born in Castlemaine.

== Career ==
=== Victorian Baptist Women's Association ===
Rees was a member of the Baptist Church. She and her husband worshipped at the North Carlton Baptist Church, and were also members of the Collins Street Baptist Church, located in Melbourne. Through her church and temperance activities, Rees came to know Cecilia Downing, another prominent Baptist woman interested in women's rights. The two women led efforts to establish a state-wide association for Baptist women, which was formed in 1924 as the Victorian Baptist Women's Association (VBWA). From 1925 to 1927, Rees was the vice-president of the new organization. She became the VBWA's second president in 1928, and held the position for a two-year term. While president, she attended, with her husband and daughter, the 1928 World Baptist Congress, held in Toronto, Canada. She was the only woman at the gathering to lead a devotional session.

In 1935, the Australian Baptist Union established a Women's Board, and Rees served as its first secretary. In 1936, she once again served a term as vice-president of the Victorian Baptist Women's Association, holding the position for a 2 year term.

=== W.C.T.U. ===
Rees became a well-known figure in the Woman's Christian Temperance Union of Australasia, the national organization for women temperance advocates. While temperance was its primary aim, the organization also addressed other related social concerns of women, including suffrage and political rights for women.

Rees began her volunteer work with the W.C.T.U in her local branch, where she was an officer. She was then elected to the executive for the Woman's Christian Temperance Union of Victoria, which was established in 1887 to provide coordination and oversight to the 18 chapters in the state of Victoria. In 1913, she was elected general secretary of the Woman's Christian Temperance Union of Victoria, and she remained in this role for twenty years, until 1933. From 1933 to 1936, she transitioned to the role of president of the state W.C.T.U., while also taking on a leading role at the national level. In 1936, she again took on the role of general secretary of the Victoria W.C.T.U. She was elected a life-president of the state WCTU in 1938.

In 1924, Rees had become treasurer of the national organization, the W.C.T.U of Australasia, and she served in this role for six years, until 1930. She then took on the role of corresponding secretary of the national W.C.T.U., serving in this post from 1930 to 1936. In 1931, she became the first editor of the national W.C.T.U. magazine the White Ribbon Signal. She continued to edit the magazine until 1939. In 1933, she also began serving as the national superintendent for literature, a role she held until 1939. In 1936, she was elected the general secretary of the W.C.T.U of Australasia.

In 1923, Rees was made a life-member of the World W.C.T.U., in recognition of her activism and commitment to the W.C.T.U. She addressed the thirteenth Convention of the World Woman's Christian Temperance Union, held in Lausanne, Switzerland from 26 July to 2 August 1928.

=== Kindergartens ===
She was a supporter of the free kindergarten movement. She collaborated with Fanny Maud Wilson and other women from the Collins Baptist Church to found the Bouvarie Street Kindergarten, held in the Baptist Mission in Melbourne. Rees served some years as president of the kindergarten. In 1908, the Free Kindergarten Union of Victoria was established to help support the kindergarten movement and to establish standards for the training of kindergarten teachers. Rees was a member of the union's executive.

=== Justice of the Peace ===
After years of advocating that women should be allowed to serve in this capacity, on 17 February 1927, Rees became a justice of the peace in Victoria. Six women were sworn in on the same day, becoming the first female justices of the peace in the state. In 1930, Rees began serving on the children's court as a magistrate. She was an early member of the Women Justices Association.

=== Women's rights and related causes ===
Like many women in the WCTU, Rees combined temperance work with advocacy on other social issues, such as women's rights, peace, poverty, housing, and protecting children. She advocated in favor of Aboriginal Australian rights, and deplored the economic hardships that Aboriginal women faced. She served as a W.C.T.U. delegate for the Slum Abolition Committee, which advocated for improving the housing conditions for the poor in Melbourne, and the Traveller's Aid Society, which provided assistance to single women who were traveling to Australia. She also served as the WCTU representative for the Children's Cinema Council, and lobbied against beauty pageants, taking on a leading role in a campaign to end them in 1927.

Rees was involved with the National Council of Women of Australia, an umbrella organization established in 1931 to unify the various state councils of women that had been established in the late 1890s through the 1910s. In 1937, she helped establish the Victorian League of Women's Electors, which in 1945 merged with two other organizations to become the League of Women Voters. She also participated in the Pan-Asian Women's Committee, which was formed by representatives of women's organizations. Rees was the WCTU delegate. The second Pan-Asian Women's Conference was held in 1930, and was attended by women from the US, China, Japan, the Philippines, New Zealand and Australia. Australia sent 17 delegates and two observers.

Rees was also the WCTU representative on the executive committee of Victoria's League of Nations Union, a group established in Melbourne in 1921 to support the newly formed League of Nations, now known as the United Nations; Rees' term began in 1929. In the fall of 1930, she participated in a peace demonstration organized by the Victorian Women Citizens' Movement, again representing the WCTU.

== Views on temperance and prohibition ==
In 1928, Rees travelled with her husband and daughter on a long oversees trip that included her attendance at the Baptist World Congress in Toronto, and the World Woman's Christian Temperance Union Congress in Lausanne. She also visited the United States, England, Wales and Scotland.

During the Rees' visit to the United States, they visited San Francisco, Los Angeles and New York, spending the 4th of July holiday at Coney Island. The United States had at that time recently passed a national prohibition on the sale of alcohol, and Rees viewed the results favorably. Upon her return, she gave several lectures and shared her reflections on the benefits of the ban on liquor in the United States. She had an overly optimistic view that prohibition would not be repealed, and was quoted as saying,"We have no fear of America ever going back because we know that the 19th amendment was women's suffrage. The women of America will never allow the traffic [of alcohol] to return."

For Rees, the use of alcohol was not merely a private concern but was a matter of public health. In 1936, when serving as president of the Australian WCTU, she remarked in her presidential address that "[t]he greatest single factor that we can control in the interest of public health is the elimination of beverage alcohol."

== Personal life ==
Bessie Johnston married Evan Rees on 26 October 1892 in Melbourne. Evan Rees had emigrated to Australia from Wales, and established a green-grocer business, which he expanded over time to a chain of fifteen stores. Like his wife, he was very active in the Baptist church, and served as president of the Baptist Union of Victoria.

The couple had five children.

- Margaret Johnston (Rees) Moyle (1897 -) and
- Evan Gwendraeth Rees (1899 - 1949),
- Owen Lloyd Rees (1900 - 1957),
- Alan Rees (1902 - 1970).
- Catherine Myfanwy (Rees) Fairnie (1904 - 2002).

Following in her mother's footsteps, one of Rees' daughters became a director of a kindergarten.

Evan Rees died in 1935, after battling a long illness, at age 75.

== Honours ==
In May 1935, Rees was awarded the King George V Silver Jubilee Medal, in honor of the 25th anniversary of King George and Queen Mary's coronations. Considered a personal gift from the King, the medal was given to 6500 Australians, as well as members of the Commonwealth and Great Britain. The selection of recipients of the award was delegated to regional authorities. Citations for this medal read, "By command of His Majesty the King the accompanying medal is forwarded to _____ to be worn in commemoration of Their Majesties' Silver Jubilee, May 6, 1935."

== Death and legacy ==
Rees died unexpectedly on 19 March 1939, at the age of 73, after attending Sunday services at the Baptist church in Auburn, a suburb of Melbourne, Victoria. Her funeral was held at Collins Street Baptist Church and was well attended. Mrs. Griffith Lloyd, the president of the Australian WCTU, spoke on behalf of the organization. Rees was buried in the Melbourne General Cemetery.

In her memory, a memorial gift of a Cloisoinée bowl was given to the Bouverie Street free kindergarten by supporters and friends.

A collection of her papers are held at the University of Melbourne Archives, as part of the Woman’s Christian Temperance Union of Victoria collection.

== See also ==
- Temperance movement in Australia
