= Mary Anne Merson =

English-born woman who arrived in colonial Australia in 1855

- Born: Mary Anne Row; 1 June 1828
- Died: 4 July 1904 (aged 76); Ballarat, Australia
- Known for: Author and Temperance activist
- Spouse: James Merson
- Children: 10

Mary Anne Merson (née Row; 1828 – 1904) was an English-born temperance movement advocate, a pioneer colonialist who arrived in Melbourne in 1855. She was an executive member of the Woman's Christian Temperance Union of Victoria and the author of a temperance tale published in 1870. Merson has been nominated for inclusion in the Australian Dictionary of Biography Colonial Women project and her book is included in the Colonial Australian Popular Fiction: A Digital Archive.

== Early life and voyage to Australia ==
Mary Anne Merson was the youngest of six children, four boys and two girls, though only Mary Anne and her sister lived to maturity. In 1855, Merson travelled from Liverpool, England to Melbourne, Australia aboard the ship Champion of the Seas. It was only the second voyage of the ship, known as a clipper, a mid-19th-century merchant sailing vessel, designed for speed. Under the command of Captain John McKirby, the voyage took eighty-three days. The ship arrived in Melbourne on 26 September 1855.

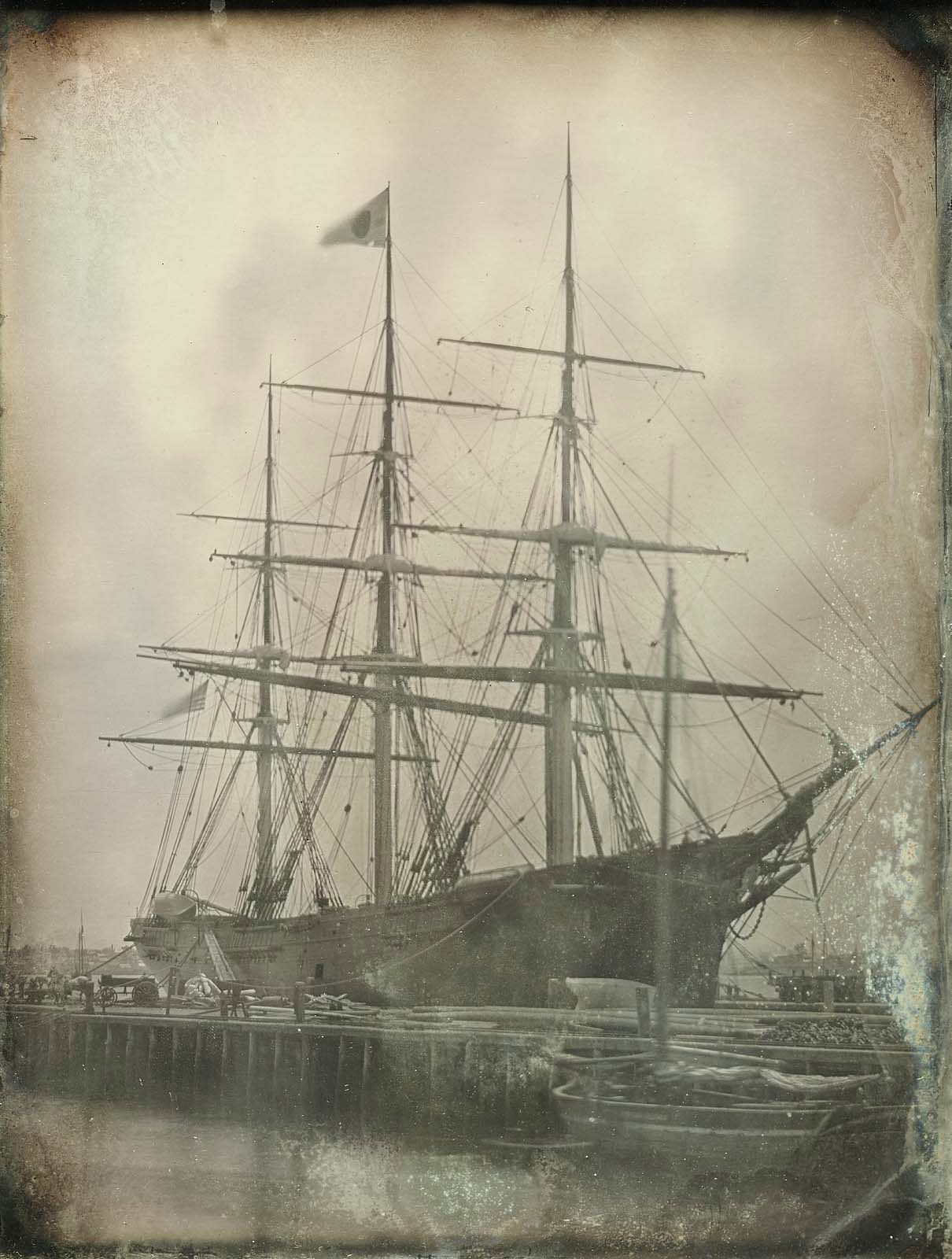
Champion of the Seas, a clipper sailing vessel

Merson made the journey with her three children, Joseph, Maria and James. On arrival, the family was able to join Mary Anne's husband James Merson, who had emigrated to Australia nine months earlier. Merson went on to have seven more children after her arrival in Australia.

== Temperance activities ==
Merson and her husband James were active members of the Christian temperance movement in Australia. Merson was an Executive member of the Woman's Christian Temperance Union of Victoria (WCTU). Merson as a superintendent of the press department of the Fitzroy branch of the WCTU and for a time she was also Colonial Press Correspondent of the organisation in Australia. At a WCTU meeting in 1890 Merson presented a report, in which she urged that the Compensation Bill that favoured publicans be removed and she appealed to the women of the colony to completely avoid dealing with wine and spirit selling grocers. Merson was one of two delegates appointed to represent the Fitzroy branch of the WCTU at the Victorian Conference held in 1896.

For many years James Merson travelled around the country lecturing about temperance. Both were also members of the Albert Street Baptist Church in East Melbourne. Later in her life Merson became actively involved in the women's suffragette movement.

== Writing ==
Merson's hand-written diary described her voyage from Liverpool to Melbourne in 1855, in addition to details of her later years, describing family life in colonial Melbourne. This memoir was acquired by the State Library of Victoria and is part of its manuscript collection. The memoir was used extensively by author Rod Fraser, in the writing of The Champion of the Seas, a book about the sailing ship, which was published in 1999. This book is also held by the State Library of Victoria as well as being included in the Mary Anne Merson manuscript archive.

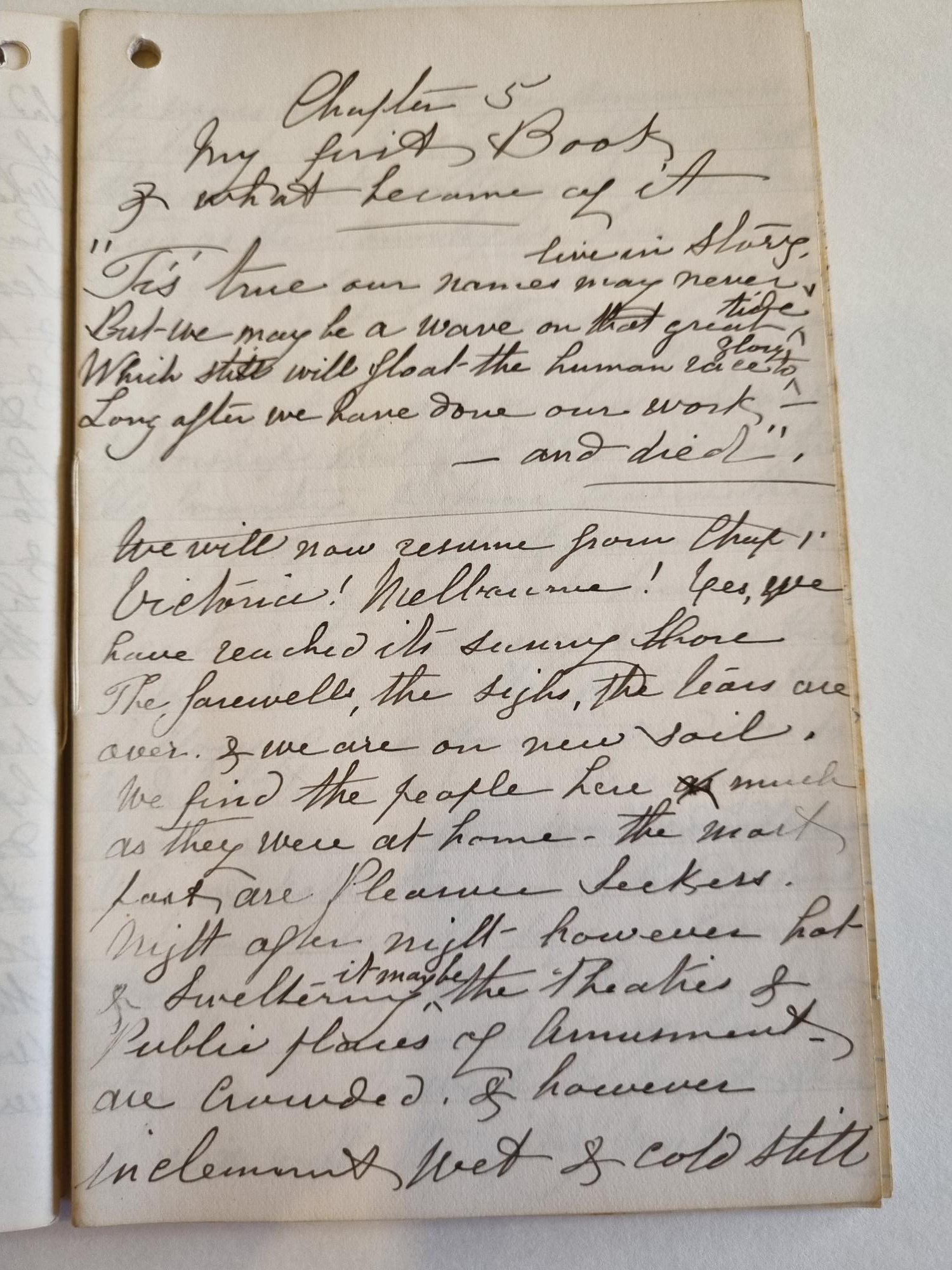
Mary Anne Merson - page from her memoir

Merson authored the book Emily Graham; or, The Dawning of light : a temperance tale, By Mrs M. J. M. which was published in 1870. This work has been included in Colonial Australian Popular Fiction: a Digital Archive, a collaborative project funded by the Australian Research Council and based at the University of Melbourne. A copy of the work held by the State Library of Victoria includes a hand written note on the title page, "Presented by the Authoress, Mrs Merson, Sebastopol Ballarat", and dated 22 June 1870. Merson is included in the list of Nominations for the Colonial Women in the Australian Dictionary of Biography (ADB) project, where she is listed as Mary Jane Merson, and noted as a writer of temperance tales. The Colonial Women project is a "large and ambitious initiative" that seeks to include new entries in the ADB for women who flourished during, or prior to, the colonial period.

== Death ==
Mary Anne Merson died in 1904 and was buried at the Ballarat Old Cemetery on 6 July 1904. The service at the house and the grave were conducted by the Reverend F. E. Harry. Harry was a well-known Baptist minister who worked for 32 years in Australia. He had the distinction of having been the president of four different Baptist Unions, including in three different Australian states (Western Australia, Victoria and New South Wales) and one in New Zealand. The service for Merson's husband James was conducted by Rev. M. G. Hart later the same year, on 8 December 1904.

In May 2004, the Immigration Museum in Melbourne hosted a function for the descendants of those who had arrived on the Champion of the Seas some 150 years previously. Melbourne historian Rod Fraser, who was also the great-great grandson of Mary Anne Merson gave a talk at the event.
