= Margaret McLean =

Australian suffragist

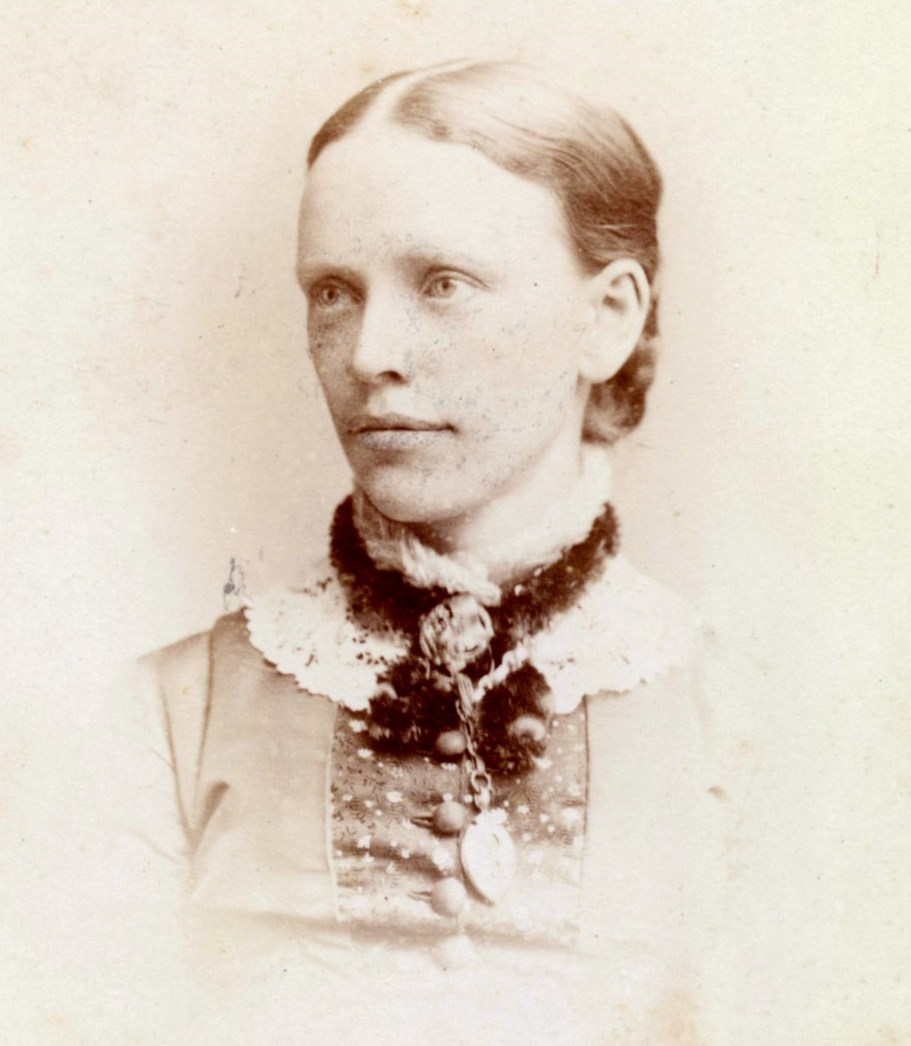
- Margaret McLean, circa 1863
- Born: Margaret Arnot; 7 April 1845; Irvine, North Ayrshire, Scotland
- Died: 14 February 1923 (aged 77); Malvern, Victoria
- Known for: Temperance activist, women's rights advocate
- Spouse: William McLean
- Children: 11
- Parent(s): Andrew Arnot; Agnes Russell

Margaret McLean (née Arnot; 7 April 1845 – 14 February 1923) was a Scottish Australian temperance and women's rights advocate.

== Early life ==
She was born Margaret Arnot in 1845 at Irvine, North Ayrshire, Scotland. She was the eldest child of Andrew Arnot and Agnes Russell. In 1849, the family relocated to East Melbourne, Victoria, Australia, where McLean attended and taught at the United Methodist Free Church School in Fitzroy, Victoria. After leaving school, she studied teaching at the Melbourne Training Institution for teachers, graduating in 1862 before starting work as a teacher at St James' Cathedral School. On 10 March 1869, she married William McLean, a merchant, with whom she lived in Kew, Victoria and had 11 children: six daughters and five sons.

== Activism ==
McLean became a strong advocate of the temperance and women's suffrage movements. In 1891 she was the first to sign – out of an eventual total of 30,000 signatures collected in a door-to-door campaign – the Victorian Women's Suffrage Petition for the Franchise, which was presented to parliament that year. She signed under the name "Mrs. William McLean", perhaps suggesting her husband's support. She was a founding member and coordinator of the Melbourne branch of the Woman's Christian Temperance Union of Victoria (WCTU); she was president of the organisation for two periods, 1892–93 and 1899–1907. Weekly meetings were held at "Torloisk", the name of her home in East Melbourne. Through the WCTU she became involved in the movement towards women's suffrage in Victoria and published two widely circulated pamphlets about the issue, Womanhood Suffrage and More About Womanhood Suffrage. She was responsible for leading a delegation to Victoria's Chief Commissioner of Police in 1897 to encourage the employment of female police officers and the designation of female-specific lockup facilities. In 1902, she helped in establishing the National Council of Women of Victoria, which advocated for juvenile courts and police matrons, in addition to women's suffrage. She was also involved in her local Collins Street Baptist Church, where she taught Bible classes for young women.

== Later years ==
Although she retired in 1907 due to poor health, McLean continued working with the Baptist Church and in social advocacy, and was appointed an honorary vice-president of the WCTU of Victoria. She was always photographed wearing a white bow, the WCTU's symbol of purity. She died in February 1923 at Malvern, Victoria.
