= List of acts of the Parliament of Victoria from 1909 =

This is a list of acts of the Parliament of Victoria, Australia for the year 1909.

== 1909 ==
Short title, or popular name	Citation	Royal assent
Long title
	9 Edw. VII. No. 2157	8 January 1909
An Act to apply out of the Consolidated Revenue the sum of One million three hundred and fifty-five thousand two hundred and forty-eight pounds to the service of the year One thousand nine hundred and eight and One thousand nine hundred and nine.
	9 Edw. VII. No. 2158	26 February 1909
An Act to apply a sum out of the Consolidated Revenue to the service of the year ending on the thirtieth day of June One thousand nine hundred and nine and to appropriate the Supplies granted in this and the last preceding Session of Parliament.
Melbourne and Metropolitan Board of Works Act 1909 (repealed)	9 Edw. VII. No. 2159	2 March 1909
An Act to further amend the Melbourne and Metropolitan Board of Works Acts. (Repealed by Melbourne and Metropolitan Board of Works Act 1915 (6 Geo. V. No. 2696))
	9 Edw. VII. No. 2160	2 March 1909
An Act to revive and continue the Voting by Post Acts. (Repealed by Constitution Act Amendment Act 1915 (6 Geo. V. No. 2632))
Victorian Government Three per cent. Stock Act 1909 (repealed)	9 Edw. VII. No. 2161	2 March 1909
An Act to authorize the raising of Money for certain purposes by increasing the Amount of Victorian Three per cent. Stock. (Repealed by Treasury Legislation (Repeal) Act 2005 (No. 73 of 2005))
Old-age Pensions Act 1909	9 Edw. VII. No. 2162	2 March 1909
An Act to increase for One Year the Total Sum appropriated for Old-age Pensions.
Victorian Loan Act 1909	9 Edw. VII. No. 2163	2 March 1909
An Act to authorize the raising of Money for Kailways Public Works and other purposes.
Railway Loan Application Act 1909	9 Edw. VII. No. 2164	2 March 1909
An Act to sanction the issue and application of certain sums of Money available under Loan Acts for Railways.
Ballaarat East Land Act 1909	9 Edw. VII. No. 2165	2 March 1909
An Act to provide for the vesting of certain Lands for the purposes of the South-street Society and for reducing the Width of certain Streets in the Town of Ballaarat East and for other purposes.
Prahran and Malvern Tramways Trust Act 1909	9 Edw. VII. No. 2166	2 March 1909
An Act to amend the Prahran and Malvern Tramways Trust Act 1907. (Note: Prahran and Malvern Tramways Trust Act 1907 (7 Edw. VII. No. 2130))
Victorian Government Loan Act 1909	9 Edw. VII. No. 2167	2 March 1909
An Act to authorize the raising of Money for Railways and Irrigation Works and Water Supply.
Closer Settlement Act 1909 (repealed)	9 Edw. VII. No. 2168	2 March 1909
(Repealed by Closer Settlement Act 1915 (6 Geo. V. No. 2629))
Meat Supervision Act 1909 (repealed)	9 Edw. VII. No. 2169	2 March 1909
An Act to amend the Meat Supervision Acts. (Repealed by Meat Supervision Act 1915 (6 Geo. V. No. 2694))
Water Supply Loans Application Act 1909	9 Edw. VII. No. 2170	2 March 1909
An Act to sanction the issue and application of certain Sums of Money available under Loan Acts for Water Supply in Country Districts and for other purposes.
Forests Excisions Act 1909 (repealed)	9 Edw. VII. No. 2171	2 March 1909
An Act to amend the Forests Act 1907. (Note: Forests Act 1907 (7 Edw. VII. No. 2095)) (Repealed by Forests Act 1915 (6 Geo. V. No. 2655))
Marine Act 1909 (repealed)	9 Edw. VII. No. 2172	2 March 1909
An Act to amend the Ninety-sixth and Ninety-seventh Sections of the Marine Act 1890. (Note: Marine Act 1890 (54 Vict. No. 1165)) (Repealed by Marine Act 1915 (6 Geo. V. No. 2688))
Eumeralla Drainage Area Act 1909 (repealed)	9 Edw. VII. No. 2173	2 March 1909
An Act to amend the Drainage Areas Acts so far as regards the Eumerella Drainage Area. (Repealed by Statute Law Revision Act 1995 (No. 11 of 1995))
University Act 1909 (repealed)	9 Edw. VII. No. 2174	2 March 1909
An Act to provide for the Establishment of a Veterinary School in the University of Melbourne. (Repealed by University Act 1915 (6 Geo. V. No. 2742))
Teachers Act 1909 (repealed)	9 Edw. VII. No. 2175	2 March 1909
An Act to further amend the Law relating to State School Teachers. (Repealed by Public Service Act 1915 (6 Geo. V. No. 2713))
Mildura Irrigation Trusts Act 1909	9 Edw. VII. No. 2176	2 March 1909
An Act relating to the First Mildura Irrigation Trust.
Metropolitan Saturday Half-holiday Act 1909 (repealed)	9 Edw. VII. No. 2177	2 March 1909
An Act to provide for a Half-holiday every Saturday in Shops in the Metropolitan District. (Repealed by Factories and Shops Act 1912 (3 Geo. V. No. 2386))
Beeac and Newton Railway Construction Act 1909	9 Edw. VII. No. 2178	2 March 1909
An Act to authorize the construction by the State of a Line of Railway from Beeac to Newtown.
Ouyen and Kow Plains Railway Construction Act 1909	9 Edw. VII. No. 2179	2 March 1909
An Act to authorize the Construction by the State of a Line of Railway from Ouyen to Kow Plains.
Moe and Walhalla Railway Completion Act 1909	9 Edw. VII. No. 2180	2 March 1909
An Act to provide for the Completion of the Moe and Walhalla Railway.
Wire Netting Act 1909 (repealed)	9 Edw. VII. No. 2181	2 March 1909
An Act to provide for supplying Owners of Land with Wire Netting for Vermin-proof Fences. (Repealed by Vermin Destruction Act 1915 (6 Geo. V. No. 2745))
Weights and Measures Act 1909 (repealed)	9 Edw. VII. No. 2182	2 March 1909
An Act to further amend the Weights and Measures Act 1890 (Note: Weights and Measures Act 1890 (54 Vict. No. 1158)) and for other purposes. (Repealed by Weights and Measures Act 1915 (6 Geo. V. No. 2748))
Chaff and Stock Food Act 1909	9 Edw. VII. No. 2183	2 March 1909
An Act to regulate the Sale of Chaff and other Foods for Stock.
Factories and Shops Act 1909 (repealed)	9 Edw. VII. No. 2184	2 March 1909
An Act to amend the Factories and Shops Acts. (Repealed by Factories and Shops Act 1912 (3 Geo. V. No. 2386))
Adult Suffrage Act 1908 (Note: Although passed in the year 1908, and given a short title ending '...Act 1908', the need to obtain approval for this act from the United Kingdom meant it was not proclaimed until the year 1909.) (repealed)	9 Edw. VII. No. 2185	31 March 1909 (Note: This act was reserved for approval by His Majesty.)
An Act to provide for Adult Suffrage. (Repealed by Constitution Act Amendment Act 1915 (6 Geo. V. No. 2632))
	9 Edw. VII. No. 2186	8 July 1909
An Act to apply out of the Consolidated Revenue the sum of One million one hundred and seventeen thousand nine hundred and seventy rounds to the service of the year One thousand nine hundred and nine and One thousand nine hundred and ten.
Assembly Electoral Rolls Act 1909 (repealed)	9 Edw. VII. No. 2187	26 July 1909
An Act relating to the Supplementary Lists and Rolls for the Legislative Assembly for the year One thousand nine hundred and nine. (Repealed by Constitution Act Amendment Act 1915 (6 Geo. V. No. 2632))
	9 Edw. VII. No. 2188	28 July 1909
An Act to apply out of the Consolidated Revenue the sum of Two hundred and eighteen thousand nine hundred and forty-eight pounds to the service of the year One thousand nine hundred and eight and One thousand nine hundred and nine.
Carriages Act 1909 (repealed)	9 Edw. VII. No. 2189	12 August 1909
An Act to alter the annual apportionment amongst suburban municipalities of amounts received by the City of Melbourne from residents in those municipalities for hackney carriage licences and carters' licences. (Repealed by Carriages Act 1915 (6 Geo. V. No. 2624))
Northcote Railway Station Improvement Act 1909 (repealed)	9 Edw. VII. No. 2190	12 August 1909
An Act to provide for improving the Access to the Northcote Railway Station. (Repealed by Transport Act 1983 (No. 9921))
Woodend Land Exchange Act 1909 (repealed)	9 Edw. VII. No. 2191	12 August 1909
An Act to provide for the issue of a Crown Grant of certain land in the parish of Newham permanently reserved for water supply purposes in exchange for certain other land transferred to the Woodend Waterworks Trust. (Repealed by Statute Law Revision Act 1984 (No. 10087))
Marriage Act 1909 (repealed)	9 Edw. VII. No. 2192	15 September 1909
An Act to amend the Marriage Acts. (Repealed by Marriage Act 1915 (6 Geo. V. No. 2691))
	9 Edw. VII. No. 2193	15 September 1909
An Act to apply out of the Consolidated Revenue the sum of Four hundred and forty-seven thousand two hundred and fifty-eight pounds to the service of the year One thousand nine hundred and nine and One thousand nine hundred and ten.
Burrumbeet Recreation Reserve Act 1909	9 Edw. VII. No. 2194	25 September 1909
An Act to cancel the Crown Grant of certain Land in the Parishes of Burrranbeet and Brewster permanently reserved as a Site for Public Park and Recreation.
Essendon Land Act 1909	9 Edw. VII. No. 2195	25 September 1909
An Act to revoke the Permanent Reservation of certain Land in the Municipal District of Essendon reserved as a Site for Conservation of Water.
Upper Yarra Traffic Act 1909	9 Edw. VII. No. 2196	25 September 1909
An Act to regulate Boat Traffic on the Upper Yarra River.
West Melbourne Literary Institute Land Act 1909	9 Edw. VII. No. 2197	25 September 1909
An Act to authorize the re-vesting in the Crown of certain Land in the Parish of North Melbourne permanently reserved for the purposes of the West Melbourne Literary Institute and the granting of the same to Trustees as a site for the incorporated institution called "The Queen Victoria Memorial Hospital" and for other purposes.
Licensing Act 1909	9 Edw. VII. No. 2198	12 October 1909
An Act to provide for the renewal of a certain Victualler's Licence in pursuance of a certificate granted by the Licensing Court for the Licensing District of Flinders.
Caulfield Land Act 1909	9 Edw. VII. No. 2199	12 October 1909
An Act to revoke the permanent reservation for Watering Purposes of certain Land in the Town of Caulfield.
Hampden Land Purchase Act 1909	9 Edw. VII. No. 2200	12 October 1909
An Act to provide for the Sale of certain Land to the Shire of Hampden by a Councillor of the said Shire.
Agricultural Show Grounds Entrance Improvement Act 1909 (repealed)	9 Edw. VII. No. 2201	12 October 1909
An Act to provide for Improving the Access to the Royal Agricultural Society's Show Grounds at Flemington. (Repealed by Statute Law Revision Act 1984 (No. 10087))
	9 Edw. VII. No. 2202	13 October 1909
An Act to apply out of the Consolidated Revenue the sum of Eight hundred and fifty-seven thousand and forty-one pounds to the service of the year One thousand nine hundred and nine and One thousand nine hundred and ten.
Companies Names Act 1909	9 Edw. VII. No. 2203	10 November 1909
An Act relating to the Name Style or Title of Companies.
Bendigo Gaol Land Act 1909 (repealed)	9 Edw. VII. No. 2204	22 November 1909
An Act to revoke the Permanent Reservation of certain Land reserved as a Site for Gaol purposes in the Parish of Sandhurst and to authorize the Reservation of part of such Land as a Site for the purposes of the Bendigo Continuation School. (Repealed by Statute Law Revision Act 1984 (No. 10087))
Castlemaine Land Act 1909 (repealed)	9 Edw. VII. No. 2205	22 November 1909
An Act to provide for the closing of portions of certain streets in the Borough of Castlemaine and to authorize the Permanent Reservation of such portions and the granting thereof as a Site for Public Recreation. (Repealed by Statute Law Revision Act 1984 (No. 10087))
Poisons Act 1909 (repealed)	9 Edw. VII. No. 2206	22 November 1909
An Act to further amend the Poisons Act 1890. (Note: Poisons Act 1890 (54 Vict. No. 1125)) (Repealed by Poisons Act 1915 (6 Geo. V. No. 2707))
Railway Funds Act 1909	9 Edw. VII. No. 2207	22 November 1909
An Act to amend the Railway Funds Act 1907. (Note: Railway Funds Act 1907 (7 Edw. VII. No. 2133))
Surplus Revenue Act 1909	9 Edw. VII. No. 2208	22 November 1909
An Act relating to the Surplus Revenue of the Financial Year ended on the thirtieth day of June One thousand nine hundred and nine and to certain unexpended balances under prior Surplus Revenue Acts.
Old-age Pensions Act 1909 (No. 2)	9 Edw. VII. No. 2209	1 December 1909
An Act to amend the Law relating to Old-age Pensions.
	9 Edw. VII. No. 2210	9 December 1909
An Act to apply out of the Consolidated Revenue the sum of Eight hundred and ninety-five thousand nine hundred and ninety-three pounds to the service of the year One thousand nine hundred and nine and One thousand nine hundred and ten.
Landlord and Tenant Act 1909 (repealed)	9 Edw. VII. No. 2211	14 December 1909
An Act to amend the Law of Landlord and Tenant. (Repealed by Landlord and Tenant Act 1915 (6 Geo. V. No. 2677))
Bendigo and Country Districts Trustees and Executors Company Limited Act 1909	9 Edw. VII. No. 2212	14 December 1909
An Act to confer Powers upon the Bendigo and Country Districts Trustees and Executors Company Limited.
Income Tax Act 1909 (repealed)	9 Edw. VII. No. 2213	14 December 1909
An Act to declare the Rates of Income Tax for the Year ending on the thirty-first day of December One thousand nine hundred and ten. (Repealed by Income Tax Act 1915 (6 Geo. V. No. 2668))
Administration and Probate Duties Act 1909 (repealed)	9 Edw. VII. No. 2214	14 December 1909
An Act relating to Duties payable under the Administration and Probate Acts. (Repealed by Administration and Probate Act 1915 (6 Geo. V. No. 2611))
	9 Edw. VII. No. 2215	24 December 1909
An Act to apply a sum out of the Consolidated Revenue to the service of the year ending on the thirtieth day of June One thousand nine hundred and ten and to appropriate the Supplies granted in this Session of Parliament.

== Sources ==
- "1909 Victorian Historical Acts". AustLII.
