= Bessie Lee Cowie =

Australian New Zealand activist and writer (1860–1950)

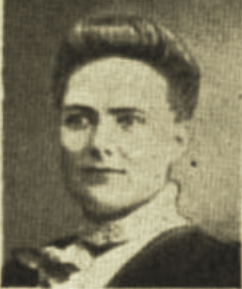
- Born: Bessie Vickery; 10 June 1860; Daylesford, Victoria, Australia
- Died: Pasadena, California, United States
- Other names: Bessie Lee
- Occupations: activist; public speaker; writer
- Organization: Woman's Christian Temperance Union of Victoria
- Movement: Temperance; Women's suffrage

Bessie Lee Cowie (born Bessie Vickery, 10 June 1860 – 18 April 1950), was an Australian temperance campaigner, social reformer, lecturer and writer, who later lived and worked in New Zealand.

== Biography ==
Lee Cowie was born in Daylesford, Victoria, Australia, as Bessie Vickery on 10 June 1860.

The community in which she was reared – an isolated gold-mining settlement, on the summit of the mountain range which divides the State of Victoria— offered little in the way of school advantage, so Lee Cowie was, for the most part, self-educated. She developed her intellectual life rapidly, becoming known in her childhood as a writer of stories and verses that were published in periodicals.

At the age of 19, Lee Cowie married Harrison Lee, of Fitzroy, Victoria, and with him made her home in Melbourne. In 1883, she became a pledged total abstainer and an enthusiastic worker in the Woman's Christian Temperance Union of Victoria (WCTU). In this service, she developed a talent for lecturing, and was appointed lecturer and organizer for the Victorian Alliance. In 1890, she paid the first of several visits to England, and she was often introduced to public audiences as "Australia’s Temperance Queen".

Lee Cowie played a prominent part in agitation regarding the local-option polls that took place throughout New Zealand in 1899 and 1902. At this stage she had already established herself as inspiring and successful leader in the suffrage movement in Australia. She lived to see the principle adopted in all the Australian States.

Some years after the death of Harrison, she removed to New Zealand, where, in 1908, she married Andrew Cowie, a native of Scotland residing at Winton, and thereafter known with the double barreled last name, Lee Cowie.

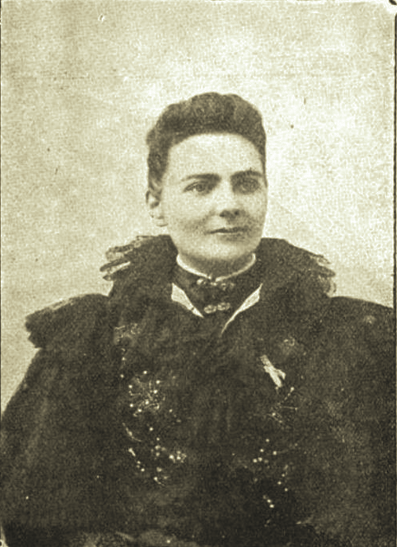
Photo portrait from The International Good Templar, 1902

Making her residence at Dunedin, Lee Cowie was appointed World Missionary of the WCTU at the session held in Geneva, Switzerland, in 1900. Her lecture-tours covered Palestine, Egypt, and Ceylon, besides parts of other countries and the whole of Australia and New Zealand. Lee Cowie attended the World's WCTU convention held in London in 1920. In 1924, she visited the U.S., on her seventh trip around the world.

She was a voluminous author of works of fiction, besides articles and songs.
