= Great Petition (sculpture) =

Sculpture in Merbourne, Australia

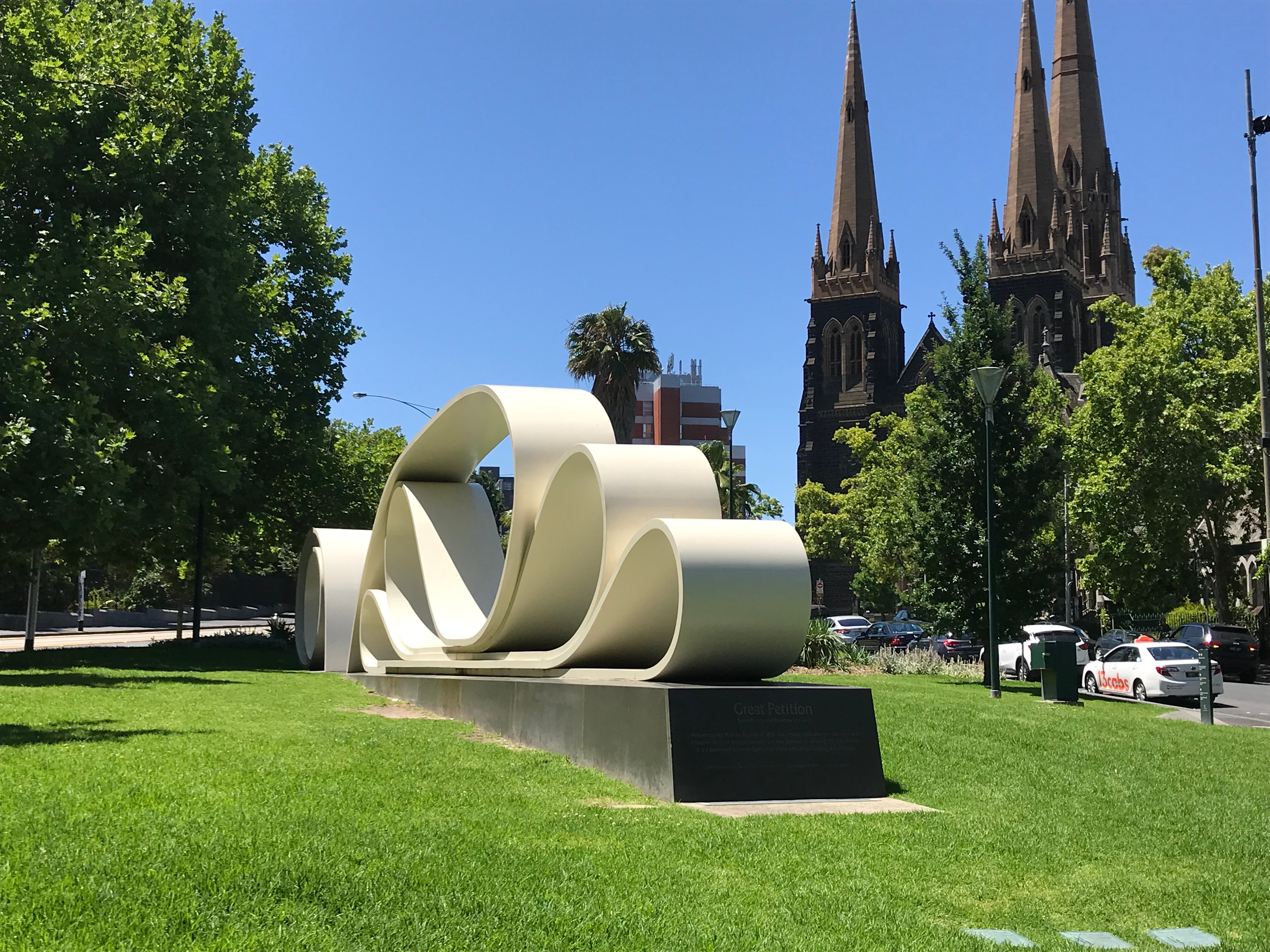
- Artist: Susan Hewitt and Penelope Lee
- Year: 2008
- Type: Bluestone and steel
- Location: Melbourne, Australia; 37°48′41″S 144°58′31″E

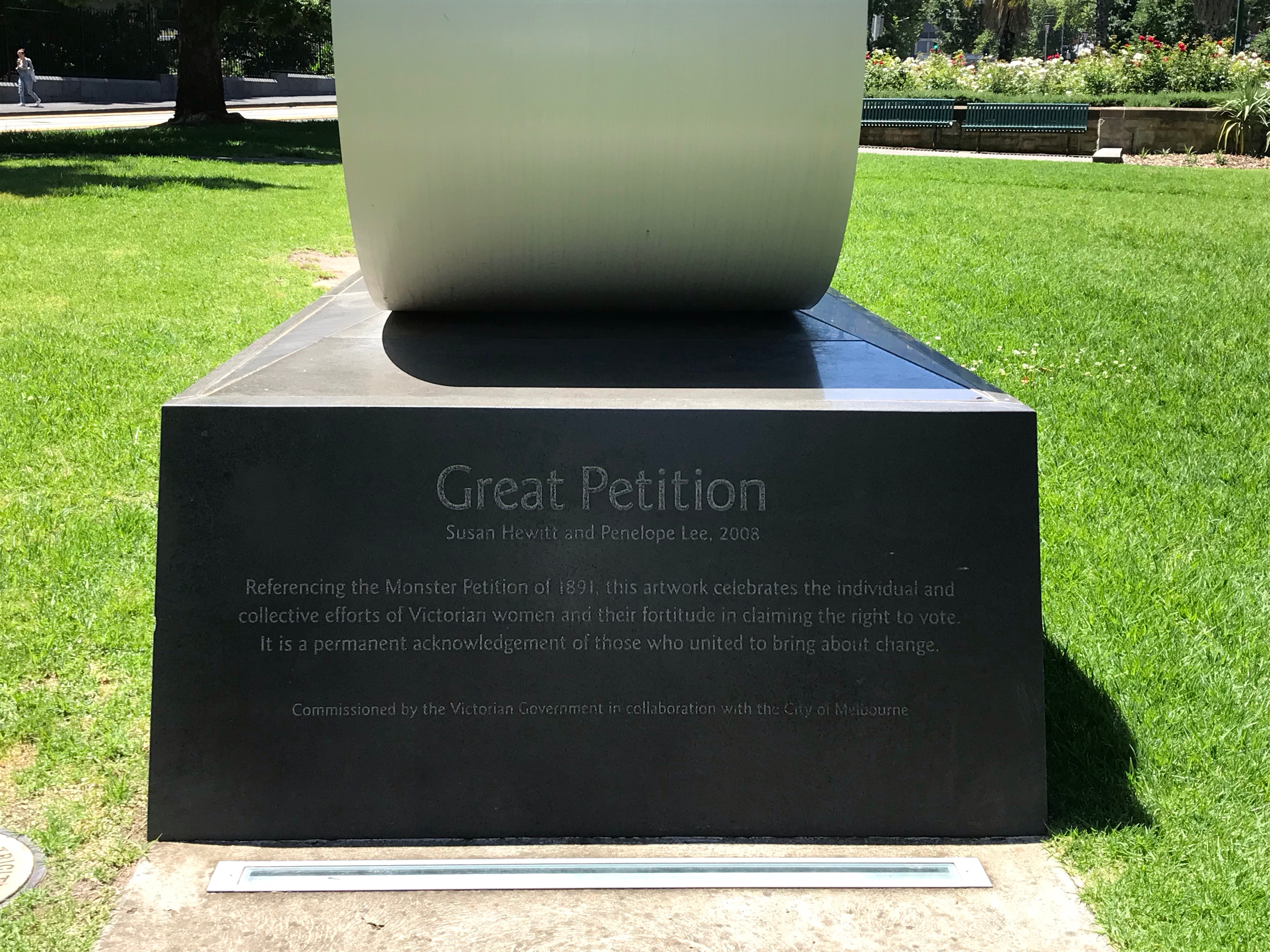
Inscription

Great Petition is a sculpture located in Burston Reserve, near the Victorian State Parliament Building, in Melbourne, Australia. The sculpture was commissioned by the State Government of Victoria and the City of Melbourne, designed by artists Susan Hewitt and Penelope Lee, and constructed by brecknock Consulting.

The sculpture refers to the "Monster Petition" calling for women to be granted the right to vote, which was signed by 30,000 Victorian women over a period of six weeks in 1891. The original petition, which consists of sheets of paper glued onto lengths of calico fabric, is 260 metres long and is held by the state's Public Record Office. The petition was tabled in Parliament in September 1891 but the ensuing Women's Franchise Bill was rejected by the Upper House. It was another 19 years before the Adult Suffrage Bill was passed by the Victorian government, however the petition is considered an important point in the state's suffrage campaign.

The sculpture is a 20-metre-long scroll which folds onto itself and appears to submerge itself underground before reappearing again on the other side of a pathway.

It was unveiled on 3 December 2008 to commemorate the centenary of women's suffrage in Victoria.

== See also ==
- List of monuments and memorials to women's suffrage
