= Victorian Women's Franchise League =

- Nickname: Victorian Women's Suffrage League
- Formation: 21 March 1894
- Founders: Annette Bear-Crawford and Woman's Christian Temperance Union
- Founded at: Flinders Street, Melbourne
- Dissolved: 1908
- Purpose: Women's suffrage in Victoria
- Affiliations: United Council for State Suffrage

The Victorian Women's Franchise League, also known as the Victorian Women's Suffrage League, was founded in the Colony of Victoria, Australia, in 1894 by Annette Bear-Crawford and the Woman's Christian Temperance Union of Victoria. Its purpose was to provide moderate Christian women an option to get involved in the movement to win women's suffrage in Victoria, without having to associate with the broader agendas of other suffrage groups at the time.

== History ==
=== Formation ===
A motion was moved on 20 February 1894 at the Women's Christian Temperance Union of Victoria meeting to create a new suffrage organisation. A notice was posted in the newspaper on 19 March 1894, that a new suffrage league was to be formed. It invited interested parties to attend the Women's Christian Temperance Union of Victoria's headquarters on Flinders Street, near Russell Street in Melbourne on 21 March 1894. Mrs Press chaired the meeting, and the council was elected, and included vice presidents Constance Stone, and Richard Richardson. The committee included Marie Kirk, Annette Bear Crawford, Annie Watson Lister, and Helen Sexton.

=== Purpose ===
The organisation was formed to allow moderate Christian women who wished for the vote, an organisation to join. The organisers clarified that the organisation was not itself a religious organisation, it was instead "one which every Christian and moral woman might join and take part in without fear of lowering her status in any way", and its purpose was to gain the vote for women "upon the same conditions as those which apply to men". They also stated they were not seeking to have women stand for parliament, or become magistrates, or taking any other role that was not, at that time, considered within the sphere of women. They were singularly seeking women's rights to vote.

== Activities ==
The Victorian Women's Franchise League, also referred to as the Victorian Women's Suffrage League, provided a space for women who were unwilling to join other suffrage organisations available at the time that were seen as too radical and free-thinking, such as Henrietta Dugdale's Victorian Women's Suffrage Society, or Brettena Smyth's Australian Women's Suffrage Society, or too left wing, such as the various progressive leagues, or focussed on temperance such as the WCTU. The same year it was founded, it became a member organisation for the United Council for Woman Suffrage, which united the various organisations to coordinate the push for women's suffrage. This allowed for a more harmonious process for different personalities and opinions within the suffrage movement to work together, without too much conflict.
