= Ballaarat Old Cemetery =

Cemetery in Victoria, Australia

- Interactive map of Ballaarat Old Cemetery

Details
- Established: 1856
- Location: Ballarat, Victoria
- Country: Australia
- Coordinates: 37.5480°S 143.8491°E
- Size: 7 ha (17 acres)
- No. of interments: 35,000
- Website: Ballaarat Old Cemetery
- Find a Grave: Ballaarat Old Cemetery
- Footnotes: Ballarat Old Cemetery - Billion Graves

Ballaarat Old Cemetery is a cemetery located in the rural city of Ballarat, Victoria in Australia. The cemetery dates back to 1856, although records show burials took place in the area from the late 1840s.

Eureka Rebellion memorials to soldiers and miners are located in this cemetery.

== Notable interments ==
- John Basson Humffray, politician
- William James McAdam, politician
- Alfred Ronalds, fly fishing author and artisan
- Captain Henry Ross, gold miner
- James Scobie, murdered Scottish gold digger
- John La Gerche, one of Creswick's first foresters
- Ellen Young, poet
- Mary Anne Merson, suffragist and temperance advocate

== War graves ==
The cemetery contains the war graves of six Commonwealth service personnel. There are five from World War I and one from World War II.

== Note ==
The archaic spelling of Ballaarat has been used on the official Ballaarat General Cemeteries website.

== See also ==
- Ballaarat New Cemetery
