= Clara Weekes =

Australian teacher, suffragist, labour leader, and activist

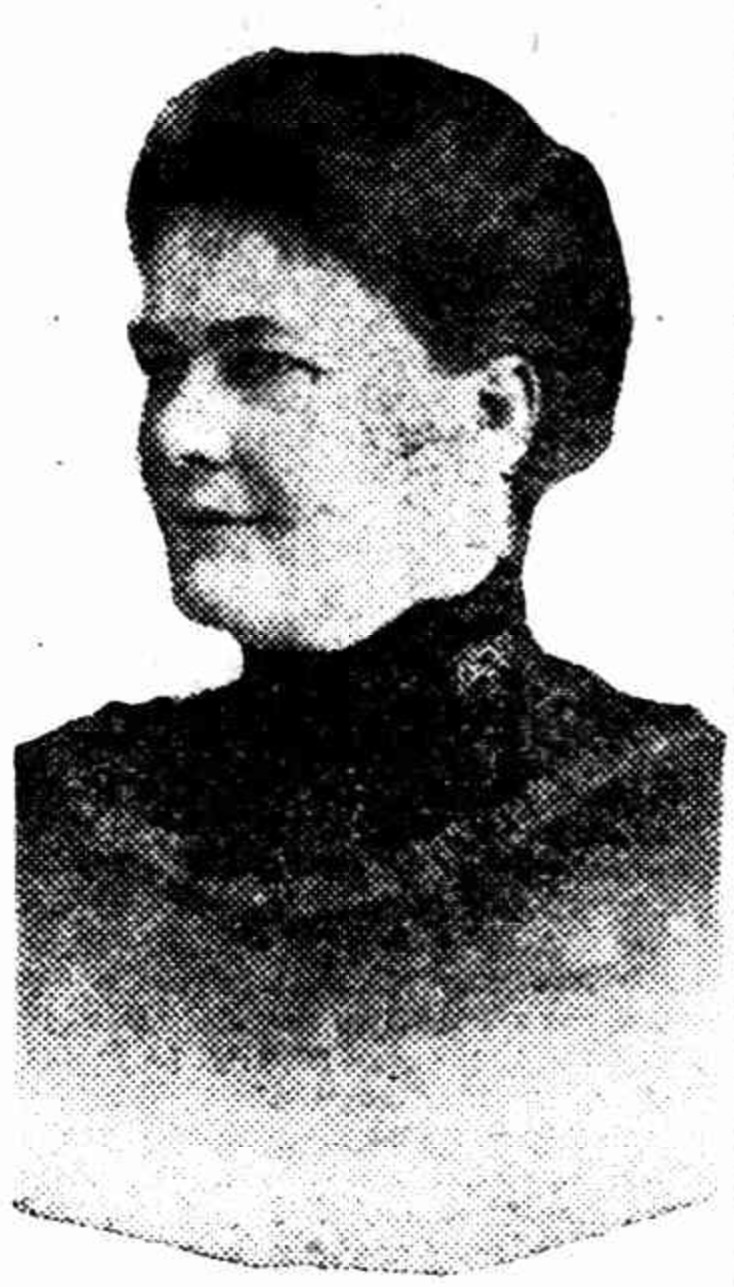
- Clara Weekes in 1910
- Born: 30 September 1852; Bristol, England
- Died: 12 April 1937 (aged 84); Melbourne, Victoria, Australia
- Occupation(s): Educator, women's rights activist, temperance and suffrage campaigner

Clara Weekes (30 September 1852 – 12 April 1937) was an Australian schoolteacher, suffragist, labour leader, pacifist, and civil and women's rights activist.

== Biography ==
Born on 30 September 1852 in Bristol, England, Weekes immigrated to Australia with her parents when she was a child. She taught in Victoria's state-run public schools for over four decades, retiring in 1913. In 1910, she was profiled in The Weekly Times while teaching at Rathdowne Street State School, where she held the highest staff position a woman was allowed to occupy at the time. Weekes served on several Victoria Department of Education committees, including being one of only six women to help organize the 1906 State Schools Exhibition.

For many years, Weekes represented women teachers in the Teachers' Union, and as the head of the Victorian Lady Teachers' Association. She was a strong advocate for equal pay for women, working on behalf not only of teachers but also for women working in other fields. She was also a suffragist, and served on the executive committee for the Victorian Women's Suffrage Society. Weekes worked with Vida Goldstein in both the equal pay and suffrage campaigns.

Weekes was an active leader in other civic organizations as well. A temperance advocate, she was a long-time member of the Woman's Christian Temperance Union of Victoria. A pacifist, she was a member of the Sisterhood of International Peace, which was formed in 1915. She publicly opposed the White Australia policy.

Weekes died in Melbourne on 12 April 1937. The Victorian Trades Hall Council runs a Clara Weekes Education Project, named in her honour.

== See also ==
- Suffrage in Australia
- Gender pay gap in Australia
- Australian labour movement
