= Maria Elizabeth Kirk =

British-Australian temperance advocate and social reformer (1855–1928)

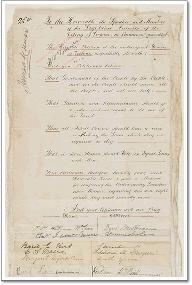
- part of the 1891 petition
- Born: Maria Elizabeth Sutton; 9 December 1855; London
- Died: 14 January 1928 (aged 72); Malvern, Victoria
- Other names: Marie
- Known for: temperance and suffrage campaigner
- Spouse: Frank Kirk

Maria (Marie) Elizabeth Kirk born Maria Elizabeth Sutton (9 December 1855 – 14 January 1928) was a British-born Australian temperance advocate and social reformer. She was involved in women's rights including organising a "Monster Petition" for women's suffrage in 1891. She was founder and inaugural organising secretary of the Woman's Christian Temperance Union of Victoria.

== Life ==
Kirk is thought to have been born in London in 1855. Her Quaker parents were Maria Elizabeth and Alfred Peter Sutton. Her father worked in retail and so did her husband (1878). In time her husband, Frank Kirk, made boots and she was involved in helping in missions in London.

In 1886 she went to Toronto as the representative of the British Women's Temperance Association in the formation of the International Woman's Christian Temperance Union (WCTU).

She emigrated to Australia in 1886 and in 1887 she and Rev. Philip Moses were key figures in the creation of the Woman's Christian Temperance Union of Victoria. Four years later there were 57 branches of members sporting white ribbons pins as part of the organisation across the colony of Victoria.

When the WCTU of Australasia was formed in 1891 she became its first secretary. She was involved in women's rights including organising a "monster" petition for women's suffrage in 1891 which she presented to parliament. The collectors were led by Isabella and Vida Goldstein and over six weeks they collected 30,000 signatures on an extant petition that is 260 metres long. It is said to be the longest nineteenth century petition. It was unsuccessful, but it raised the profile of the call for women to receive a vote.

She co-founded the National Council of Women of Victoria to campaign for equal pay, education for women and the rights of children. In 1892 the WCTU in Victoria published the "White Ribbon Signal". Kirk was its editor.

In 1894 the Victorian Women's Franchise League was created as an offshoot of the WCTU temperance union and Kirk was on the founding committee.

In 1897 she attended temperance conventions in the UK and America representing the organisation in Victoria.

== Death and legacy ==
Kirk died in Malvern in 1928. She had founded the WCTU's South Richmond kindergarten in 1909 and it was renamed in her honour and it was still operating in 1933. She was posthumously inducted onto the Victorian Honour Roll of Women in 2001. The National Council of Women of Victoria was extant in 2023 campaigning for equal pay, technical education for women and the rights of children.
