= Jessie Mary Lloyd =

Australian temperance campaigner

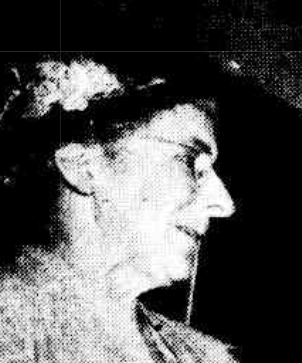
- Mrs Griffiths-Lloyd in 1950
- Born: Jessie Mary Hunt; 13 June 1883; Wolverhampton
- Died: 24 October 1960 (aged 77); Blackburn, Victoria
- Other name: Jessie Mary Griffiths
- Occupation: Temperance campaigner
- Spouses: Robert Griffiths; Rev. George S. Lloyd
- Children: three (and a step child)

Jessie Mary Lloyd previously Jessie Mary Griffiths and born Jessie Mary Hunt (13 June 1883 – 24 October 1960) was an Australian temperance campaigner. She was President of the Woman's Christian Temperance Union in Victoria in 1930 when 43% people polled were in favour of prohibition and from 1933 to 1945 she led the national WCTU.

== Life ==
Lloyd was born in Wolverhampton in the West Midlands in 1883 however before her first birthday she was emigrating. Her parents Louisa (born Griffiths) and Harry Hunt took their family to Melbourne in Australia on board the SS Lusitania.

Her first husband, Robert Griffiths, was also from Wolverhampton and she married him at St Hilary's Church in East Kew. He died, leaving her a widow in 1916 with three children. She adopted a fourth child, when she married, seven years later, to the Rev. George Samuel Lloyd, as his second wife. He was a Methodist minister based at Stawell although their marriage took place at the Methodist church in Kew. Lloyd was known as Griffiths-Lloyd and she was by then a seasoned member of the Woman's Christian Temperance Union (WCTU) and she specialised in education. The WCTU prepared literature for children and via the home hints section of the White Ribbon Signal she donated articles for their mothers. The signal had been running in Victoria since the 1890s. She was on the WCTU education committee and she organising the elocution contest where children competed to be the best at reading aloud Temperance based poetry or prose. By 1932 she was the president of WCTU in Victoria and that year the organisation had its first district conference in Hamilton. The major subject of discussion was temperance information in children's education.

In 1935 she wrote an article about how the human eye works for the Eyre Peninsula Tribune revealing it to be "a human camera" – that could be damaged by alcohol.

In 1936 she was elected President of the WCTU after serving as vice-president for three years. She served up to, and through the years of, the second world war and she stood down in 1945. She was also concerned about world hunger and she led the WCTU's interest in world peace. The Australian Association for Peace's convention in 1957 saw her as the WCTU's delegate. At her instigation the WCTU protested to the UK government over their use of Australian land to conduct testing of British atomic bombs.

Lloyd died, a widow for the second time, at her home in Blackburn.
