= Cecilia Downing =

(1858–1952) Australian temperance worker, community activist and political organizer

Cecilia Downing MBE
- Born: Cecilia Hopkins; 13 January 1858; London, England
- Died: 30 August 1952 (aged 94); Melbourne, Victoria, Australia
- Occupation: Activist
- Known for: Temperance activities, advocacy for women's concerns and rights
- Spouse: John Downing (m. 1885)
- Children: 7

Cecilia Downing MBE (née Hopkins; 1858–1952) was an Australian temperance and women's rights activist and leader. She was one of Australia's first child-probation officers. A devout Baptist, she was an influential leader in the Woman's Christian Temperance Union of Australasia, the Housewives' Association of Victoria, the Federated Association of Australian Housewives, and the Traveller's Aid Society. She was appointed a member of the Order of the British Empire in 1950.

== Early life ==
Cecilia Hopkins was born on 13 January 1858 in Islington, London, England. Not long after her birth, her parents, Issac and Mary Hopkins, emigrated to Melbourne, Australia, where Issac Hopkins found work as a plasterer. The family lived in Williamstown, Victoria.

Cecilia Hopkins attended the Training Institution in Carlton, and earned a teaching certificate for primary education.

In 1885, she married John Downing, a Baptist pastor who had studied with Charles Spurgeon, a well-known British preacher. The couple had seven children together.

== Career ==
Downing worked as a child-probation officer in 1907, become one of the first people to hold this newly formed government role.

Cecilia Downing was very active in charity and activist organizations, and was particularly involved in the temperance movement. She joined the Australasia Women's Christian Temperance Union, which was formed in 1891. This was the first national women's organization in Australia, and was affiliated with the World Woman's Christian Temperance Union (World WCTU). Downing helped launch a local chapter in Kyneton. She later became the president of the regional division of the Woman's Christian Temperance Union of Victoria in 1912, after serving for a time as the recording secretary. She also directed the immigration department for the Union, beginning in 1911.

Downing was also a key leader in the Housewives' Co-operative Association. The organization was established to help women find cheaper prices for goods, by forming a co-operative. The association later was renamed the Housewives' Association of Victoria, and functioned to advocate for the rights of women, including in the political arena. Downing was one of the first members of the group, and served as vice-president in 1917, just two years after the organization was launched. Downing became president in 1938, and served in this role until 1952. She also served as president of the national organization, the Federated Association of Australian Housewives, from 1940 to 1945. While she led the national organization, its membership grew to 130,000 members, making it the largest women's organization in the country at the time.

A devout Baptist, Downing participated in many church women's groups. She was a member of the Collins Street Baptist Church for over 40 years. In 1910, she co-founded the Women's Guild there.

She served as the secretary of the Baptist's Women's Association Victoria, and in 1940, helped launch the Victorian Women's Inter-church Council.

In 1946, she was appointed the first national president for the National Traveller's Aid Society. The organization was started in 1916, by women affiliated with the YWCA in Victoria. Its mission was to help women who were traveling to new locations for work or other reasons.

On 8 June 1950, Downing was appointed a Member of the Order of the British Empire (MBE), for "service to social welfare services in Victoria."

== Death ==
Cecilia Downing died on 30 August 1952, aged 94, in Melbourne, Victoria, Australia.

Her son Walter Hubert Downing was a lawyer and author of two books, including Digger Dialects, on words and expressions coined by Australian soldiers in WWI.
