= Ellen Young (poet) =

Protofeminist poet

- Born: Ellen Francis Warboy; 1810; Hampshire, England
- Died: 27 January 1872 (aged 61–62); Ballarat, Victoria, Australia
- Occupation: Proto feminist poet

Ellen Francis Young (c. 1810 – 27 January 1872) was an English-born Australian early proto feminist poet living in the time of the Australian Gold Rush.

== Early life ==
She was born Ellen Warboy, around 1810 in Hampshire, England. and married a chemist, Frederick Young in 1837, in St James Church, Clerkenwell, London.

By 1841, they were living in Shoreditch, with Fredericks family, until he sailed to Australia in 1851. Ellen followed him two years later, arriving at Geelong in July 1853. They then left to dig for gold at Ballarat, arriving in February 1854.

Frederick was a miner and the life that the Youngs led was a hard one as the income was minimal and they were poor.

Ellen Young was one of the women who acted as a "leader" in the movement of women's rights. She organised petitions.

== Literary life ==
Young wrote her first poem, published in the Geelong Advertiser on 1 June 1854. It was based on the conditions of life at the diggings and was first titled "Ballarat", although later it became known as "The Digger's Lament". She was among the first to introduce the idea that many miners "laboured hard, all to no avail", and suggested the arrival of the new governor, Charles Hotham, would improve matters.

Young was a poet who typically wrote either political or questioning poems.

Young published many of her poems in the Ballarat Times and signed them all "Ellen F Young, the Ballarat Poetess", challenging the anonymity thought suitable for female literary figures at that time.

== Death ==
Frederick died on 4 September 1868 at the age of 56. Ellen Young died four years later on 27 January 1872 at the age of 62. They are buried together in the Ballarat Old Cemetery.

The last statement she made was a letter to the editor of The Ballarat Star, in defence of a perceived slight against her recently deceased husband.

In May 1870, Young transcribed her poems into a small volume that was donated to the Ballarat library, where it still is available to be seen.
