= Temperance movement in Australia =

The temperance movement has been active in Australia. As with the movement internationally, in Australia it has sought to curb the drinking of alcohol. The temperance movement had some success in the early twentieth century, although from the Second World War its influence declined. Nevertheless, temperance organisations remain active today.

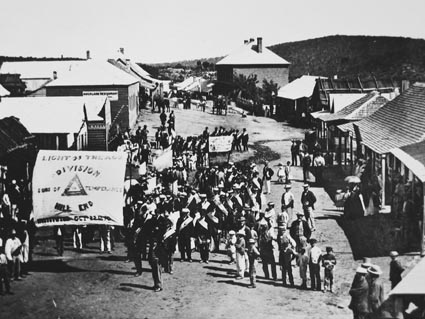
Sons of Temperance Procession, Hill End, New South Wales, 1872. Image from collection of National Archives of Australia.

== History ==
In Australia, the temperance movement began in the mid-1830s, promoting moderation rather than abstinence. The Independent Order of Rechabites has been active in promoting temperance in Australia from the 1870s to the present-day; the Band of Hope was also very active in many states, and in Sydney, the Australian Home Companion and Band of Hope Journal was published between 1856 and 1861.

In the 1880s, a significant number of hotels around the country were built as or converted to coffee palaces, where no alcohol would be served. With the waning of the influence of the temperance movement, most of these hotels either applied for liquor licenses or were demolished.

In the mid-1880s the US-based Woman's Christian Temperance Union (WCTU), a more successful abstinence-oriented movement, set up a branch in Australia. The inaugural President of the federated Australasian Woman's Christian Temperance Union (WCTU) was Jessie Ackermann, who visited the country in 1889, 1891 and 1894. However, the movement failed to bring about prohibition, as happened in the United States, despite a long campaign for a local option. Both the Woman's Christian Temperance Union and the Rechabites achieved a major success during the First World War when they were successful in bringing in mandatory closure of hotel bars and public houses at 6 pm, from the previous norm of 11 or 11.30 pm.

The first state to introduce early closing was South Australia in 1916 as a war austerity measure. New South Wales, Victoria and Tasmania followed in the same year, as did New Zealand in 1917. Western Australia adopted a 9pm closing time, but Queensland retained the old closing times until it introduced eight o'clock closing in 1923. Alcohol was originally banned in Canberra but was made legal again following a plebiscite in 1928. Jessie Mary Lloyd was the President of the WCTU of Victoria in 1930 when a poll of the state returned 43% in favour of a ban on alcohol.

Six o'clock closing was considered a failure as it did not curb alcohol consumption and led to the notorious six o'clock swill where customers would rush to drinking establishments after work and consume alcohol heavily and rapidly in anticipation of the 6 o'clock closing. Early hotel closing times began being wound back from the 1930s, with the last Australian state, South Australia, doing so in 1967.

== In contemporary society ==
A legacy of the temperance movement is Melbourne's “dry areas” where residents must vote to approve liquor licences in the area. These areas are a small pocket of about a dozen suburbs in the eastern suburbs, which are subject to such severe restrictions on the issuing of liquor licences that they are without any pubs and have a limited number of other licensed venues. In the 1920s, local opinion polls were taken and residents of these areas voted for the creation of a dry area.

Today, organisations such as the Independent Order of Rechabites and the Woman's Christian Temperance Union continue to promote the cause of temperance, specifically focussing on "preventing the extension of hotel opening hours and the increase of licences" as well as promoting "public education and the health and social effects of alcohol". Newer groups, such as the Foundation for Alcohol Research & Education (founded in 2001), have arisen and have launched campaigns such as one to ban alcohol advertising at sporting events.

== See also ==
- Alcohol laws of Australia
- Blue law
- International Organisation of Good Templars
- Cecilia Downing
- Federal Coffee Palace
