= Annette Bear-Crawford =

Australian suffragist and social reformer (1853–1899)

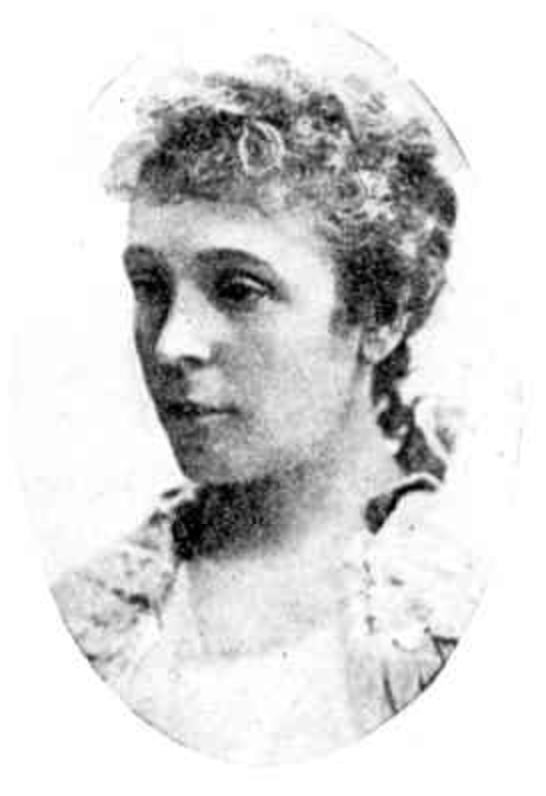
- Born: Annette Ellen Bear; 23 February 1853; Collingwood, Victoria, Australia
- Died: 7 June 1899 (aged 46); London, England
- Known for: Co-founding: The Victorian Women's Suffrage (Franchise) League; The United Council for Women's Suffrage; The Queen Victoria Hospital for Women

Annette Ellen Bear-Crawford (née Bear; 23 February 1853 – 7 June 1899) was an Australian women's suffragist and social reformer in Victoria. She was instrumental in uniting and training the women's suffrage organisations in the Colony of Victoria to coordinate a sustained campaign for women to gain the vote. She established a shilling fund to found the Queen Victoria Hospital, Melbourne. She was a social reformer, and successfully agitated to have the age of consent increased, and have women involved in factory inspecting, and policing to ensure the safety of women.

Bear-Crawford died unexpectedly from pneumonia, aged 46, while on a trip to England where she attended the Women's International Conference. She died before women gain the vote in Victoria or Australia. She also died a week before the opening of the Queen Victoria Hospital, Melbourne. In 2007, she was inducted into the Victorian Honour roll of women.

== Early life ==
Bear-Crawford was born Annette Ellen Bear, in Collingwood, Victoria, on 23 February 1853 to Annette Eliza Bear née Williams, and John Pinney Bear. John was from Devon, England and made money on a stock and station agency in Australia, and with his earnings he established the Chateau Tahbilk winery on the Goulburn River. She had eight siblings, three brothers and five sisters. Her education was provided firstly by governesses in Australia and England, until she attended Cheltenham Ladies' College, Gloucestershire.

== Career ==
=== Early social work career in the UK ===
After her schooling, she visited France and Germany for a time, before returning to England to train in social work to work in London's New Hospital. She was known for her involvement with the National Vigilance Association (NVA). She was also involved in the women's suffrage movement in the UK which was being led by Millicent Garrett Fawcett. Her parents moved back to Australian in 1888, however, Bear-Crawford had already established herself, and stayed in England. She returned to Australia, aged 37, to live with her mother when her father died in 1890.

=== Returning to Australia ===
After returning to Australia Bear-Crawford got involved in the same work she left behind in England. She focused on issues concerning the welfare of women and children. She joined the Women's Christian Temperance Union of Victoria (WCTU) and got involved in their causes. In 1891 the WCTU held a women-only meeting about the Criminal Law Amendment Bill which would raise the age of consent for girls, in the Colony of Victoria, from 10 to 16. It was being heard in parliament, and the WCTU resolved to lead a deputation to the Premier James Munro to pressure him not to water down the bill, as some members of parliament were suggesting the bill be changed to only raise the age to 14. Bear-Crawford attended the deputation as a representative of the National Vigilance Association of which she had been a member in England. After this, Bear-Crawford was involved in forming the Victorian Vigilance Society, based on the National Vigilance Association. The inaugural meeting was held at the Athenaeum Hall in Melbourne on 5 April 1892, and the foundational members included the chairman Reginald Brabazon, 12th Earl of Meath, as well as James Balfour, John Laurence Rentoul, and Constance Stone, who all gave speeches. The Earl of Meath, a member of the National Vigilance Association in Britain, delivered congratulations from the association to Bear-Crawford on the successful passing of the bill which raised the age of consent to 16, a feat which had not yet been successful in Britain.

Bear-Crawford became a leader in the Australian women's movement which was then focusing on gaining the vote. Bear-Crawford believed that 'the vote would be the most effective instrument for improving conditions of life'. Using her organizational skills, she strove to strengthen and subsequently unite the existing suffrage societies. With the support of the Woman's Christian Temperance Union of Victoria (WCTU), she formed the Victorian Women's Suffrage (Franchise) League. She initiated the establishment of the United Council for Woman Suffrage in 1894, and was elected its first president and later on honorary secretary. Despite much lobbying of both politicians and municipal councillors and the collection of many signatures on a monster petition supporting votes for women, members of the Legislative Council did not pass the franchise bill.

She trained other women in the art of public speaking, including Vida Goldstein, who attended public meetings with her, and learned how to tackle hecklers and answer tricky questions. Bear-Crawford regularly spoke at WCTU and suffrage meetings and also encouraged women to seek election to school boards. She pushed for changes to legislation affecting women, including for the age of consent be raised to sixteen, and for women to be appointed as factory inspectors and to the committee of the Benevolent Asylum.

She played a part in the establishment of the Queen Victoria Hospital for women in Melbourne and organized the successful Queen's Willing Shilling fund in 1897 to launch the scheme but died shortly before the hospital opened.

== Personal life ==
In 1894, Bear-Crawford married William Crawford, and they both adopted a double barreled last name, combining both of their names.

She was described by Beatrice Webb as a 'gentle-tempered intelligent woman who keeps me company in the dowdiness of her dress'. The Age reported in an editorial of 22 September 1897 that she had 'uttered the rather astounding dictum that most things worth having were originally produced by women. Man, she said, is destructive, while woman is constructive'.

== Death and legacy ==
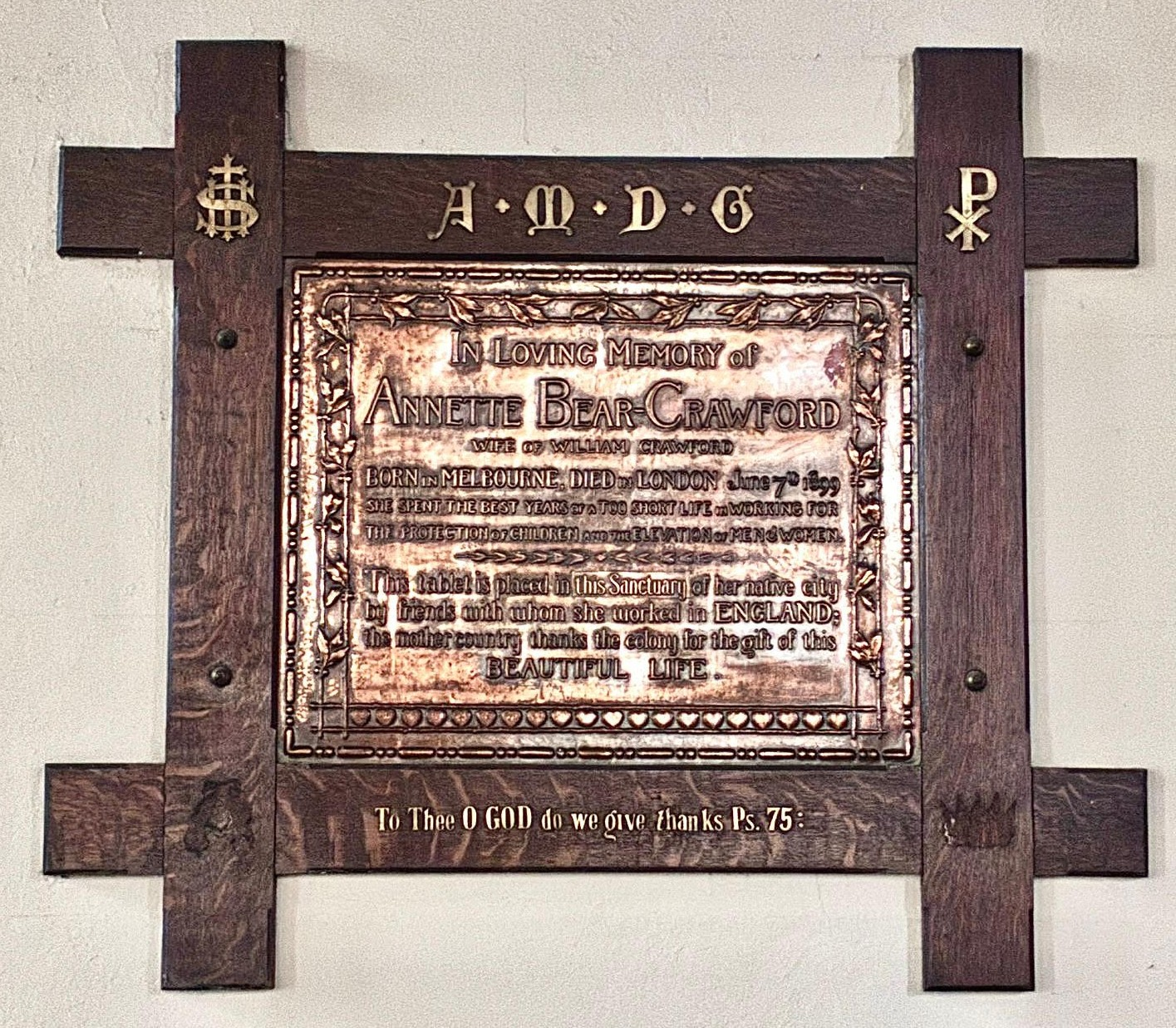
Plaque to Bear-Crawford at the Christ Church, South Yarra

Bear-Crawford was farewelled in November 1898 at the Prahran Town Hall, and sailed to England to attend the Women's International Conference. She died in London of acute pneumonia, on 7 June 1899, aged 46. A memorial service was held in St Paul's Cathedral, Melbourne on 4 July at which tribute was made to the "philanthropic and self-sacrificing work carried on throughout her life".

A special non-denominational service for women workers was held at Christ Church, South Yarra on 9 February 1902 at which a bronze plaque was unveiled to her memory in tribute to her work in England and Australia.

In 2007 Bear-Crawford was inducted to the Victorian Honour Roll of Women.

== See also ==
- Women and government in Australia
