= Woman's Christian Temperance Union of Victoria =

Temperance organisation based in Australia

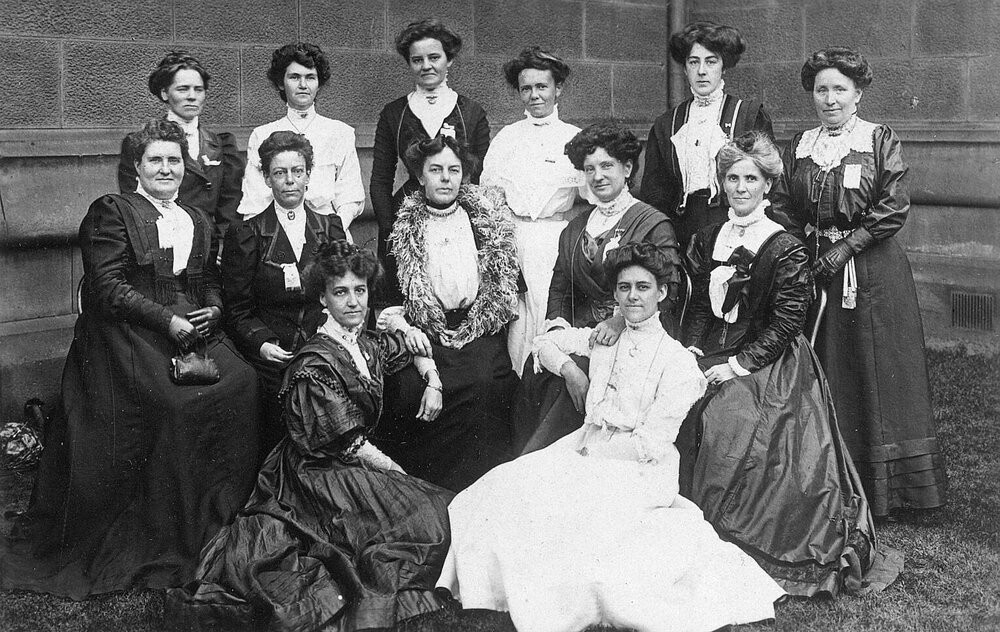
- Successor: WCTU Drug-Free Lifestyles
- Formation: 1887; 139 years ago
- Founders: Marie Kirk; Rev. Phillip Moses
- Purpose: Temperance
- Organising Secretary 1887-1913: Marie Kirk
- General Secretary 1913-1933: Elizabeth Laurie Rees
- Inaugural President: Mary M. Love
- Second President: Margaret McLean
- Parent organisation: National Woman's Christian Temperance Union of Australia
- Affiliations: United Council for State Suffrage
- Website: drugfreelifestyles.com.au

The Woman's Christian Temperance Union of Victoria (WCTU), now trading under the name WCTU Drug-Free Lifestyles, is a branch of the Woman's Christian Temperance Union, based in the State of Victoria, in Australia. It was founded before the Federation of Australia, in the Colony of Victoria, in 1887, when the 12 existing local branches in the colony, the first of which was established in 1885, merged to form a colonial union. Its purpose was primarily promoting total abstinence of alcohol, and members sign a pledge of abstinence.

The WCTU adopted the original motto of the international organisation For God and Home and Native Land, and the symbol of the white ribboned bow.

== Background ==
=== Formation ===
The Temperance movement in the Colony of Victoria picked up in the early 19th century, after the liquor licencing laws that had been inherited from the Colony of NSW, were amended to allow for an increase in liquor sales. Hotel licenses were allowed time extensions, and the licences to sell liquor was reduced from £100 to £25. There was concerns that the greater availability of alcohol would lead to social problems. As such, temperance organisations such as the Melbourne Total Abstinence Society, founded in 1842 at the Scots Church on the corner of Collins and Russell Streets in Melbourne.

In 1885 an American Woman's Christian Temperance Union missionary Mary Clement Leavitt travelled to Australia to promote the Temperance Movement. She founded local unions around Victoria. In 1887, Marie Elizabeth Kirk an English Immigrant who had been involved in the British Women's Temperance Association, and the Reverend Philip Moses, a Congregational minister from Armadale, founded a central organisation, the Woman's Christian Temperance Union of Victoria. Kirk would be the organising secretary, and driving force of the organisation until 1913. Kirk was succeeded by Elizabeth Laurie Rees, who had been involved in the WCTU as a branch manager, and member of the executive. Rees would stay in the role for 20 years, retiring in 1933.

Mary M. Love, another American who had been involved with the branch in the USA became the inaugural president. Love came to Australia in 1886 to visit her sister and on noting the large quantity of Breweries and public houses decided to get involved. The organisation's primary focus was on promoting abstinence of alcohol and wished to change the legislation to put controls on the sale of alcohol.

The organisation's second president Margaret McLean stated:

"One purpose was in the hearts of us all, that of doing all that woman can do, when inspired by the love of Christ, to rescue those who are enslaved by strong drink, and in every way consistent with women's sphere to help the suffering and to lead the sinful to a better life..."

The organisation set up a series of departments to divide up the activities associated with achieving their purpose. Each had an elected superintendent to lead the department. Some of the departments included:

- Department of Drawingroom Meetings: Recruitment of new members
- Department of Prison Work: Arranged prison visits, and support after release
- Department of Unfermented Wine: Encouraged Christian men to uptake non-alcoholic substitutes
- Department of World Peace.
- Department of Women's Suffrage.
- Department of Health, Hygiene, and Education.
- Department of World's Missionary.
- Department of Police Matrons.

Other departments have covered Aboriginal welfare, sex education, drug education, film censorship, peace arbitration, gambling, and drink driving.

The organization adopted the white ribbon bow symbol from the international parent organisation, and the motto For God and Home and Native Land. The motto was later changed to For God, Home and Humanity.

=== Suffrage ===
In 1890 they adopted a resolution that as men and women both have to obey laws, they both should be able to elect those who make the laws.

The resolution stated:

"As men and women are alike in having to obey the laws … they should also be equal in electing those who make the laws; and, further, that the ballot in the hands of women would be a safeguard to the home, in which the interests of women are paramount, and as what is good for the home is also good for the State, the enfranchisement of women would be conducive to the highest national welfare."

They then became one of the leading organisations in the State lobbying for voting rights for women. They were instigated the collaboration of the other suffrage organisations to collect signatures for the Victorian women's suffrage Monster Petition. They were also instrumental in the formation of the moderate Victorian Women's Franchise League in 1894, and the same year they joined the United Council for Woman Suffrage.

=== Children's Welfare ===
The WCTU was focussed on the welfare of children from the start. They pushed for reforms in the systems around 'Boarding out' and successfully installing inspectors. They also successfully lobbied to have the age of consent for girls to be raised on 12 to 16 years of age.

The WCTU first started lobbying for a Children's Court in 1900. It was argued that children should be kept separate from the adult criminal system, and they should be provided with probation officers to guide them to avoid a criminal career. They used the American model as an example. They later teamed up with other women's organisation such as the National Council of Women to lobby successfully for a Children's Court bill in 1906, which saw the creation of the Children's Court of Victoria giving children under 17 private and separate hearings from adults with specialist judges, and probationary officers. Flos Grieg, an Australian lawyer who was the first woman to enter the faculty of law at Melbourne University in 1897 and to practice law in Australia in 1905, drafted the bill for amendments.

In 1909, the Woman's Christian Temperance Union free Kindergarten, which was the first in Victoria. It also provided lectures from doctors and nurses in the associated School for Mothers. This was the precursor to Baby Health Centres. The kindergarten closed in 1953, and became a centre for children with intellectual disabilities.

The WCTU ran a children's branch called the Loyal Temperance Union.

=== WCTU drinking fountain ===
The various temperance organisations had installed a number of public water fountains throughout the city of Melbourne in the latter half of the 19th century, to provide an alternative to alcohol, which was the only easily available beverage at that time. In October 1900, Marie Kirk proposed that the WCTU undertake the "construction of a marble and granite drinking fountain to be donated to the City of Melbourne." The fountain was erected and unveiled by October 1901 on the corner of Elizabeth and Victoria streets. The inscription states that it is a commemoration the Duke and Duchess of Cornwall and York, who would later become George V and Queen Mary of the United Kingdom, visiting Melbourne. The stone fountain is topped with a statue of a woman, representing hope. She has the index finger of one hand pointing to the sky, while the other hand rests on an anchor.

=== Monthly journal: The White Ribbon Signal ===
Kirk proposed the creation of a monthly Journal and, in November 1892, The White Ribbon Signal was launched. She was the editor until her retirement in 1913.

== Drug-Free Lifestyles ==
Sometime before 2025, the organisation adopted the trading name 'WCTU Drug-Free Lifestyles'.

As of 2025, the WCTU was still a registered charity who provide drug education for primary and secondary aged children. They also provide community education about the dangers of drinking while pregnant. They also provide food support for Asylum Seekers.

== Associated people ==
- Bessie Lee Cowie (1860–1950) – An Australian New Zealand activist and writer who assisted in the foundation of Victoria's WCTU. However she parted ways with the organisation due to a difference of opinions. Cowie believed that any sexual activity that did not have the intention of procreation was sinful.
- Annette Bear-Crawford (1853–1899) – An Australian social reformer, and a leader of the Victorian suffrage movement. Bear-Crawford was instrumental within the WCTU in forming the Victorian Women's Franchise League. She was also the founder of the United Council for State Suffrage, of which the WCTU was a member organisation.
- Cecilia Downing (1858–1952) – An Australian temperance worker, community activist and political organizer. She was a founding member of the Kyneton branch, before becoming first the recording secretary in 1909, and then the President of the State branch in 1912. Under her leadership the branch expanded rapidly, and by gaining support from other women's organisations to lobby for dry canteens for the military.
- Mary Anne Merson (1828–1904) – An English-born temperance movement advocate, was a WCTU delegate from the Fitzroy branch where she was superintendent of the press department.
- Antoinette Kensel Thurgood (1842–1915) – An American philanthropist who was superintendent of the young women's work department.
- Grace Vale (1860–1933) – An Australian physician and suffragist was involved with the WCTU's Girls Club where she provided free medical advice to young women. She was also a vice president of the Victorian Women's Suffrage League.
- Clara Weekes (1852–1937) – An Australian teacher, suffragist, labour leader, and activist, and was a long standing member of the WCTU.
