= Sylvanus James Magarey =

Australian surgeon and politician (1850 - 1901)

The Honourable Dr Sylvanus Magarey
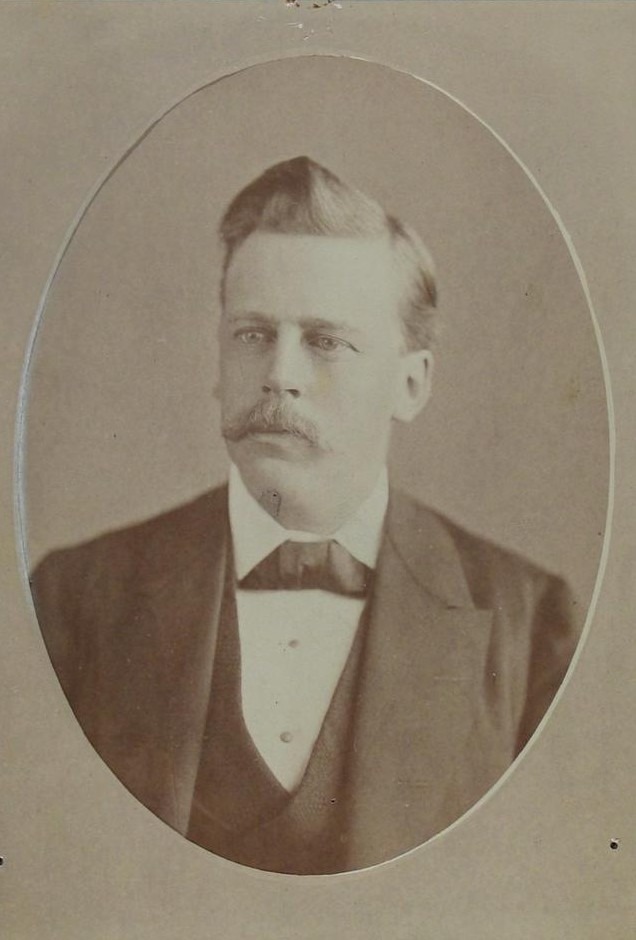

Member South Australian Legislative Council for Central District No. 1
- In office 8 May 1888 – 21 May 1897

Personal details
- Born: 21 October 1850
- Died: 24 March 1901 (aged 50) Adelaide, South Australia

Sylvanus James Magarey (21 October 1850 – 24 March 1901) was a surgeon and politician in the Colony of South Australia, described as "an exemplary citizen, social reformer and legislator". He was a foundation Councillor of the Women's Suffrage League.

== History ==
Magarey was born the second son of Thomas Magarey and Elizabeth Magarey. He was educated at Adelaide Educational Institution and St Peter's College. He worked for a few years in his father's milling business before studying medicine at the University of Melbourne, graduating Bachelor of Medicine in 1873. He qualified Bachelor of Surgery in 1887, and Doctor of Medicine in 1888.

Magarey was an Honorary Physician at the Adelaide Homeopathic Dispensary in King William Street, that offered free service to the poor, along with (later fellow parliamentarian) Dr. Allan Campbell.

Magarey was particularly interested in the health of children, and was for some years honorary medical officer to the Adelaide Children's Hospital.

Magarey published two pamphlets:

- Our climate and infant mortality (1879)
- Most fatal diseases of infancy and childhood (1880)

Magarey was briefly involved with medical training for Ellen Arnold, one of South Australia's first female missionaries.

== Politics and other interests ==
Magarey was elected to the Legislative Council for Central Districts from May 1888 with G. Witherage Cotton and retired at the end of his term in April 1897.

Magarey was, like his father, a teetotaler and an elder of the Church of Christ, Grote Street, Adelaide. He was a founding member of the South Australian Alliance. While in parliament he fought for temperance causes and succeeded in mandating Sunday closing and raising the legal drinking age to 21. He favoured payment of members of parliament, a State Bank, and women's franchise.

Magarey became a foundation councillor of the Women's Suffrage League and supported the principles of the League in the Parliament and in public. He spoke on the platform of the Women's Christian Temperance Union, being in favour of their aims and advocating the suffrage for women. A man of compassion and of science, his clearly stated arguments were of great value to the Women's Suffrage League. Mary Lee, one of the founders of the South Australian Women's Suffrage League, said in her estimation there were four men whose names should live on South Australian history's 'brightest page' for their part in gaining the suffrage: they were Dr Edward Stirling, Robert Caldwell MHA, the Hon. Sylvanus Magarey and the Rev. J. C. Kirby. Lee said Magarey 'has never failed whenever and wherever he could help us.'

Magarey was an active member of the Field Naturalists Society of South Australia, with a particular interest in seashells.

== Family ==
Magarey's father Thomas Magarey was an earlier member of the Legislative Council and Thomas Magarey's nephew William James Magarey sat in the House of Assembly from 1878 to 1881 for the seat of West Torrens. His brother-in-law William Robertson was a partner in his medical practice; his brother Cromwell Magarey and his son Frank Magarey were also medical practitioners.

Magarey married Maria Robertson ( – 7 October 1920), sister of his partner William Robertson, on 18 March 1875. Their seven children included:

- Percy Rupert Magarey (1876 – 6 May 1935) married Alice Margaret Jones (1887–1978) in 1910. He took over Birks Chemists on Rundle Street in 1905, was wounded at Gallipoli, and was a prominent Justice of the Peace.
- Frank William Ashley Magarey (1877 – 31 January 1912) married Louise Koeppen "Louie" Henderson ( –1974) on 3 July 1907. He, too, was a physician, teetotaler and churchman, and a footballer and cricketer.
- William Thomas Magarey (1882–1928) married Elsie Maud Hall ( –1962) on 9 June 1906

- Kathleen Elise Magarey (1908–1997) married Edgar Vincent "EV" Lawton (1908–1990) in 1933. He was an executive of Birks Chemists. Their son John William Magarey Lawton (born 1939) was an immunologist, and daughter Christine "Tina" Lawton (1944–1968) was a singer.

- Margaret Sylvia "Madge" Magarey (1884–1947)
- Donald Dunbar Magarey (1896 – 20 February 1942) served with 11th Field Ambulance, First AIF. He served as treasurer of the Pharmaceutical Society of South Australia for a time, and president in 1931 and 1932.

Maria married again, to William Marshall Green, on 21 January 1907.
