= Augusta Zadow =

Australian trade unionist (1846–1896)

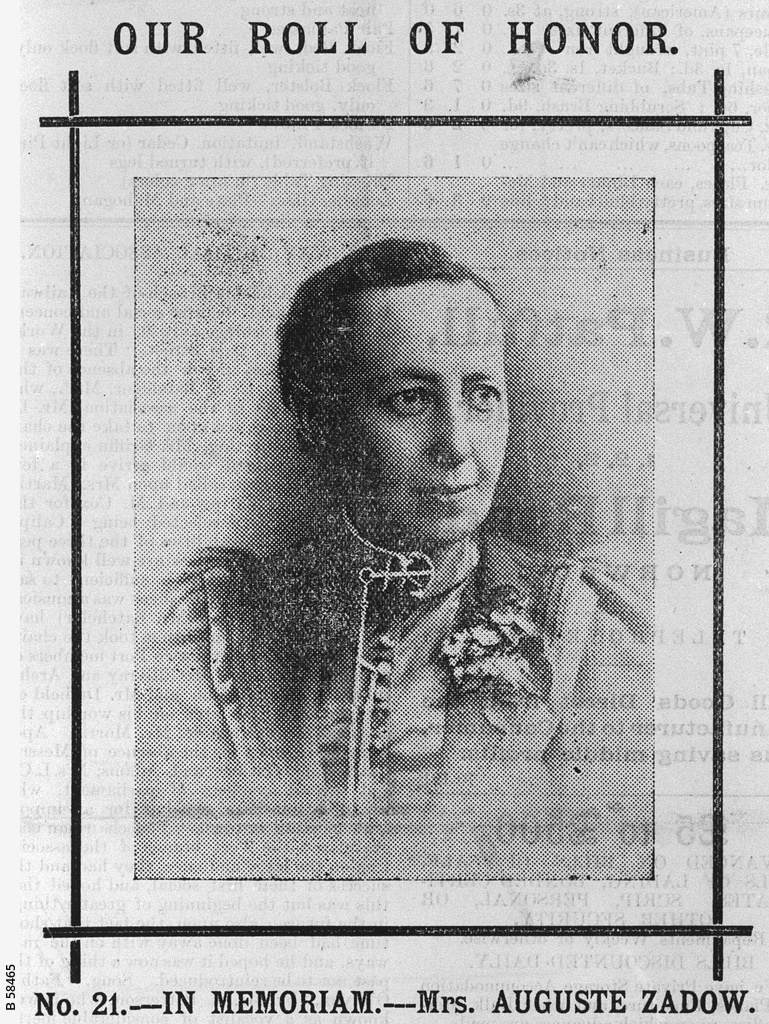
Portrait of Augusta Zadow, the first woman Inspector of Factories. Taken from the Weekly Herald newspaper 17 July 1896 page 1. State Library of South Australia B-58465

Christiane Susanne Augustine "Augusta" Zadow (née Hofmeyer; 27 August 1846 – 7 July 1896) was a German-Australian trade unionist.

== Early years ==
Christiane Susanne Augustine Hofmeyer was born on 27 August 1846 in Runkel in the Duchy of Nassau. She was educated at the Ladies' Seminary, Biebrich-on-Rhine, and following her studies became a governess. By 1868 she was working as a tailor in London, England. She met her husband Christian Wilhelm Zadow, a tailor and political refugee from Germany, in London and the pair married in 1871. They travelled to Australia with their young son on the Robert Lees, arriving in Adelaide, South Australia, in 1877.

== Union activities ==
In Adelaide, Zadow became an advocate for women working in clothing factories. She was a major contributor to the establishment of the Working Women's Trades Union in 1890 and was a delegate to the United Trades and Labour Council of South Australia. Mary Lee, David Charleston and Zadow prepared a list of fair wages and prices for use in Adelaide.

Zadow spoke in favour of women's suffrage and was a supporter of the Women's Suffrage League and Mary Lee.

Following the franchise of women in South Australia in 1894, she was appointed a factory inspector by the government of Charles Kingston. She inspected factories and monitored working conditions for women and minors.

== Personal life ==
She died on 7 July 1896 of haematemesis following an illness from influenza in 1896 while preparing a report on the Factories Act. She was buried at the West Terrace Cemetery.

== Recognition ==
The Augusta Zadow Scholarship was formed in her honour in 1994. It is awarded annually to individuals involved in women's health and safety issues in South Australia.

== See also ==
- Agnes Milne
