= Elizabeth Webb Nicholls =

Australian suffragist (1850–1943)

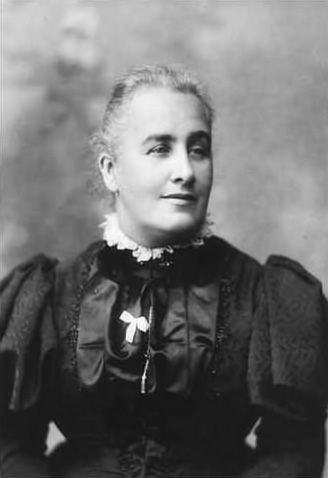
- Elizabeth Webb Nicholls in 1895
- Born: 21 February 1850; Rundle Street, Adelaide
- Died: 3 August 1943 (aged 93); North Adelaide
- Occupation: Suffragist
- Known for: President of the Woman's Christian Temperance Union (WCTU) of South Australia

Elizabeth Webb Nicholls (21 February 1850 – 3 August 1943) was a key suffragist in the campaign for votes for women in South Australia during the 1890s. She took on several high-profile roles in the capital of South Australia, Adelaide and was President of the Woman's Christian Temperance Union (WCTU) of South Australia, one of the most prominent organisations in the successful campaigns which made South Australia the first of the Australian colonies to grant women the right to vote in 1894.

== Background ==
Nicholls was born on 21 February 1850 in Rundle Street, Adelaide to parents Samuel Bakewell, grocer, and his wife Mary Ann, née Pye. Following her mother's death when she was just three years old, Nicholls spent some years living with relatives in England before returning to Adelaide. Her father remarried, his new spouse being Mary Ann's sister Eliza Hannah. Nicholls herself married warehouseman Alfred Richard Nicholls on 2 August 1870, having one daughter and four sons as well as taking in two orphaned relatives who they also raised in their household.

As a young woman Nicholls is quoted as saying I long to have the will and the power to be very useful.

Her father Samuel and her uncle William both became members of the South Australian House of Assembly, providing her with some background in local politics.

An active member of the Archer Street Wesleyan church in North Adelaide, Nicholls taught Sunday School and distributed religious tracts.

Nicholls was said to be "short in stature, with a benign expression, she was a pleasant, unself-conscious speaker and quickly earned her members' approval for her efficiency and enthusiasm", Nicholls was described as being "prone to chafe quietly at 'unreasonable restraint'"

== Woman's Christian Temperance Union ==
In July 1886, three months after its formation, Nicholls joined the "WCTU of South Australia". Becoming heavily involved in 1888, Nicholls became the provisional president of the Adelaide branch late that year and was elected colonial president in 1889, holding the position until 1897.

In 1891, Nicholls became one of the first women admitted to the South Australian Temperance Alliance, later shortened to "South Australian Alliance".

Nicholls founded the WCTU's journal Our Federation and was its editor from 1898 to 1904 when it ceased.

== Women's suffrage ==
Nicholls reinvigorated the WCTU's suffrage work and encouraged women to write to their local Member of Parliament. She invested large amounts of effort in educating women on their political potential, speaking in numerous places on the basics of enrolling and voting, using her 'Platform of Principles'.

Nicholls joined the Women's Suffrage League of South Australia and subsequently became a League Councillor. In 1894 she assumed the role of Colonial Superintendent of the WCTU's Suffrage Department.

Nicholls helped to gather 8,268 of the 11,600 signatures for the 1894 South Australian Women's Suffrage Petition to the South Australian Parliament, which led to the passing of the Constitutional Amendment (Adult Suffrage) Act 1894.

== Later life ==
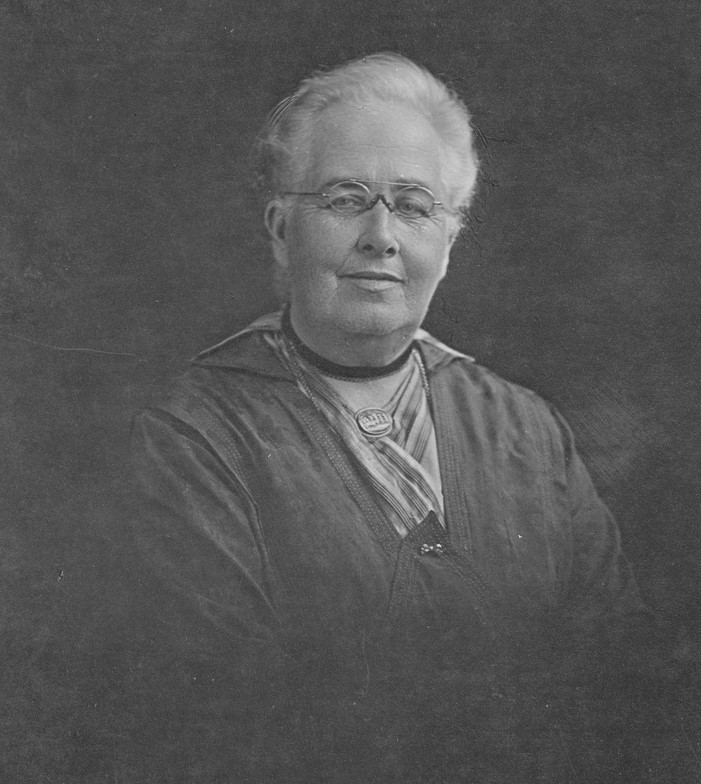
c.1919

Nicholls was an appointed member of the Adelaide Hospital Board from 1895 to 1922 and was one of the first four female Justices of the Peace appointed in 1915 and would often sit on the Children's Court. Nicholls advocated for similar female appointments in other Australian States and argued for prison reform. She also sought the improvement of conditions and wages for working women which led to her becoming a shareholder of the women's South Australian Co-operative Clothing Co.

From 1909, Nicholls was a member of the Women's Non-Party Political Association, becoming its president in 1911. She remained passionate about women's suffrage and was elected vice-president of the League of Women Voters and attended the 10th World Convention of the International Women's Suffrage Alliance at Geneva in 1920. In 1921 she helped found the Australian Federation of Women Voters and lobbied the League of Nations (now the United Nations) on behalf of Australian women.

Nicholls remained committed to the WCTU throughout her life and was involved in successful referendum of hotel closing hours which resulted in the imposition of a 6:00 pm closing time in 1915. She justified all reforms on the grounds of temperance and social purity.

Her husband, who had worked 55 years with G. & R. Wills & Co., died on 11 November 1920. Nicholls moved into Willard House, the WCTU Adelaide headquarters and residence on Wakefield Street near Francis Xavier's Cathedral. She died at North Adelaide on 3 August 1943 and is buried in Payneham cemetery, South Australia.
