= Agnes Milne =

Factory inspector

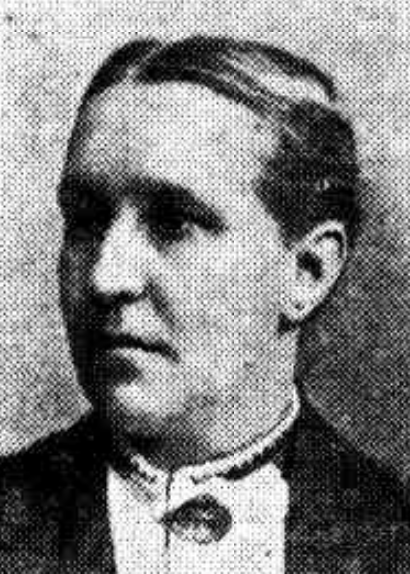
Agnes Anderson Milne, c. 1897

Agnes Anderson Milne (1 December 1851 – 1919) was a founding member of the South Australian branch of the Women's Christian Temperance Union, a member of the first executive of the Working Women's Trades Union, and South Australia's second female factory inspector.

== Background ==
The second daughter of William and Lydia Inglis, Milne was born on 1 December 1851 in Lambeth Walk, London, England. In 1855 her family migrated to South Australia, where they settled at Hindmarsh, Adelaide. Milne taught at the Hindmarsh Congregational Church Sabbath School and worked as a shirtmaker prior to her marriage to Henry Milne in 1873. Milne and Henry had four children, none of whom survived infancy and in 1883 Henry himself died. Milne attempted to keep his saddlery business operating but when this failed she returned to shirtmaking.

== Commitment to improving the working lives of South Australian women ==
Milne's concern over the wages and conditions for women and her own experiences of working 14–16 hours a day lead her to becoming a founding member of the Women Worker's Trades Union along with Augusta Zadow and Mary Lee in 1889. She was also heavily involved in the pursuit of women's suffrage. Milne differed from both Zadow and Lee in that she was a working woman with grass roots involvement in the clothing trade. In this same year she also became a foundation member of the Women's Christian Temperance Union (WCTU) and she was president of the Bowden branch for twenty six years.

By 1892 Milne had her own shirtmaking workshop in her home at Bowden where she employed five other women. In that same year she gave evidence at the Commission of Enquiry into Shops and Factories. Milne spoke of long working days as a cutter, and impressed on the Commission that fatigue and exhaustion were common among clothing trade workers.

== Role as inspector of factories ==
Augusta Zadow died in 1896 and Milne became South Australia's second female factory inspector. In her first six months in this role she made 342 inspection visits to factories. Milne later recalled that these visits were "greatly resented" and that she was sworn at, threatened with being kicked downstairs and had doors bolted against her. Milne was committed to eliminating the practice of "sweated labour" and used her inspector's position to lobby for the formation of an Anti-Sweating League. Milne also used her position to promote the establishment of the Working Girl's Club, a place for female workers to spend "a quiet and enjoyable time, instead of parading the streets".

While Milne at first had the support of her superiors for these activities, when she began to agitate for the formation of a Co-operative Shirtmaker's Association, J Bannigan the Chief Inspector of Factories wrote to the South Australian Ministry of Industry and the Minister about her activities. In 1904 Milne was forced to defend her reporting to the Committee of the Alleged Sweating Evil and the accuracy of her reports was discussed in the South Australian parliament.

Milne did enjoy the support of the governor's wife, Audrey Tennyson, who said that Milne was "a very interesting, sensible woman".

== Later life ==
In 1907 Milne retired as South Australia's factory inspector to become the manager of the South Australian Co-operative Clothing Factory, which was owned and run by women and which had been Milne's idea. In 1913 Milne retired to a house next door to the Hindmarsh school that had once been her mother's. From this house she sold lollies and lunches to the school children. In 1916 she married Hartley Wright Edwards at Holy Trinity Church Adelaide. Only three years later, in 1919, she died of cancer and was buried in the Hindmarsh Cemetery.
