= Rosetta Jane Birks =

Australian social reformer and philanthropist (1856-1911)

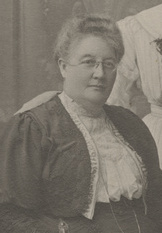
- Born: Rosetta Jane Thomas; 12 March 1856; Adelaide, South Australia
- Died: 3 October 1911 (aged 55); Adelaide, South Australia
- Spouse: Charles Napier Birks (m. 1879)

Rosetta Jane "Rose" Birks (1856–1911) was a social reformer and philanthropist who played a key role in South Australian women's suffrage.

Birks née Thomas was born in Adelaide, South Australia on 12 March 1856 to English-born parents William Kyffin Thomas, proprietor of the Observer and Register newspapers, and his wife Mary Jane Thomas, née Good. Known to her family as Rose, Birks was heavily involved in the Flinders Street Baptist Church in Adelaide that her father helped establish.

In 1879 Birks married her sister's widower, wealthy Baptist merchant Charles Napier Birks and became the stepmother to her six nieces and nephews. The Birks family would later establish the Charles Birks & Co department store in Rundle Street, Adelaide.

== Philanthropy ==
Throughout her life Birks was involved in advancing women's rights and the welfare and social issues of the day. Birks presided over several Baptist women's associations including a mothers' union and a women's guild which she established to provide a support network to working women members of her church.

In 1882 Birks joined the predecessor of the Women's Suffrage League, the Ladies' Social Purity Society, taking the role of treasurer.

Following South Australian women's enfranchisement, Birks joined the Woman's League committee and was among the earliest women appointed to the Adelaide Hospital board and the Queen Victoria Maternity Home board.

In 1902 Birks helped to found and became vice-president of the South Australian branch of the National Council of Women of Australia with fellow suffragist Mary Lee.

== Women's suffrage ==
Birks and her husband would often host 'drawing room afternoons' in their Glenelg home to discuss the key social issues of the day. Inevitably this would lead to the discussion of women's rights and the issue of suffrage, and Birks was key in gaining local support for women's enfranchisement.

Through her role in the Ladies' Social Purity Society, Birks quickly became involved in the Women's Suffrage League, accepting the position of Treasurer at her second meeting in 1888. Birks would hold this position until the League ceased operation and during this time she travelled to England to meet with women involved in the British suffragette movement.

Birks was proudly the first woman at the Glenelg polling station to vote in April 1896.

== Young Women's Christian Association ==
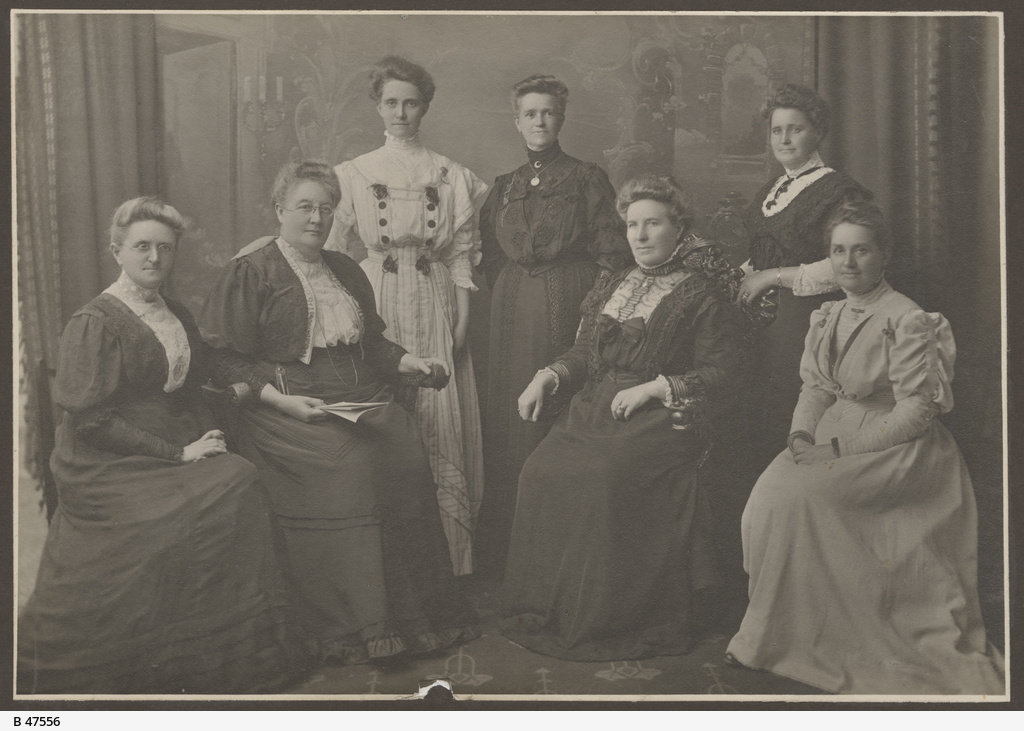
Members of the YWCA Committee: Mrs L.Goode, Mrs C. Birks, Mrs Anderson, Lady Goode, Mrs L.S. Neill, Mrs J.R. Fowler and Miss E. Colton, 1910

Birks was elected President of the Adelaide Young Women's Christian Association in 1902 and is credited with its expansion and the modernisation of the Australasian movement. Under Birks' leadership the Adelaide YWCA was the first branch to introduce junior membership in 1893, opening club activities to girls as young as ten. Other innovations included introducing child-rearing lectures and classes promoting the development of womanhood 'science'.

Birks was involved in the YWCA internationally and attended conferences in London and Paris in 1906 and Berlin in 1910 as the Australasian member of the YWCA world committee. In 1911 she launched the YWCA Travellers' Aid Society to support government-assisted immigrants, particularly young women who intended to seek work as domestic servants.

In June 1914 the Rose Birks wing of the YWCA hostel in Adelaide was opened by Lady Marie Galway.

== Death ==
Committed to her church until the end, Birks collapsed and died of myocarditis while addressing a meeting of the College Park Congregational Church in Adelaide on 3 October 1911.

Birks is buried at West Terrace Cemetery, Adelaide.
