= H. Estcourt Hughes =

Australian Baptist minister (1869–1951)

Henry Estcourt Hughes (15 September 1869 – 17 April 1951) was a South Australian Baptist minister and temperance activist, editor and author.

== History ==
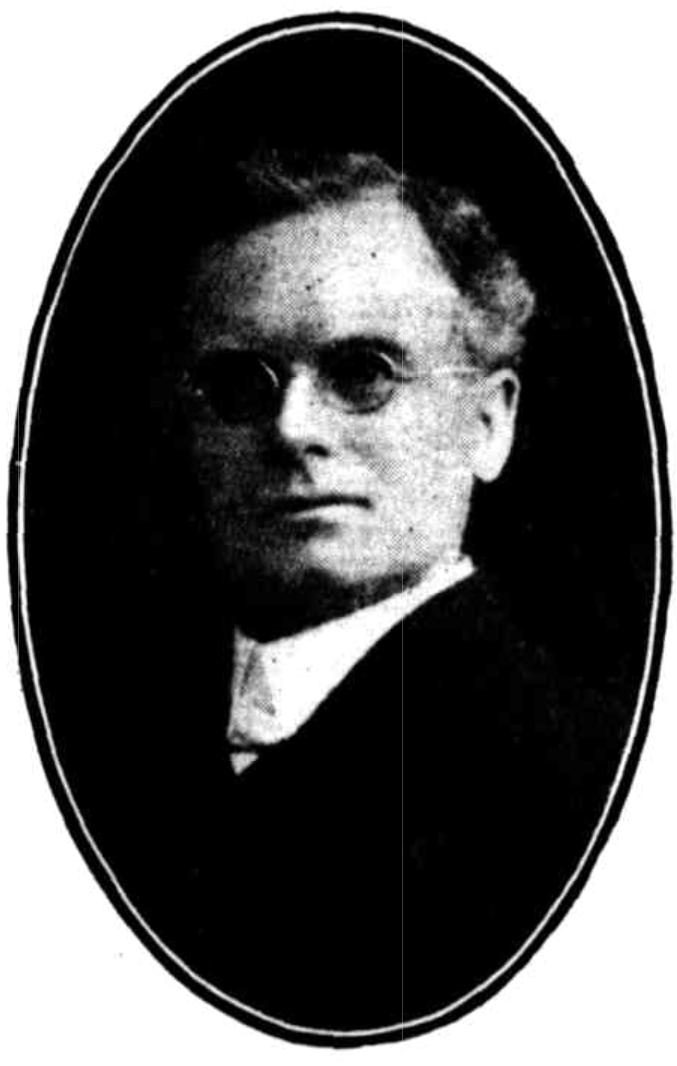
H. Estcourt Hughes

Hughes was a son of James Hughes (c. 1826 – 26 June 1892) and Elizabeth Jane Hughes, née Pounsett, of Morphett Vale, in which region he grew up and trained with his father as a saddler before deciding on a career as a Baptist minister. On 8 September 1891 he began training at Way College (Note: It is likely boarding and classroom facilities of Way College, owned by the Methodist Church, were made available to the Baptist church, who had no college of their own. Rev. John Price, the regular tutor, had recently retired due to ill health.) under Revs. Silas Mead and William A. Bell. His application for a second year of training (and residence) to coincide with his university studies was rejected due to lack of funds. He successfully completed the first year of a B.A. degree at the University of Adelaide, but quit after one year, citing health problems. and for much of the following year toured England and Europe. He returned to Adelaide and in 1894 was ordained in the Baptist church.

=== Ministry ===
He was ministering at the Mannum church in 1895 when he was granted the licence to conduct marriages, Jamestown, and Gawler, then spent six months visiting every Baptist church in the state, promoting the denomination's Twentieth Century Fund.

In October 1903 he was appointed to the pastorate of the Unley Park Baptist Church. In July 1908 he accepted a call to the Dawson Street Church, Ballarat and in 1911 resigned, citing implacable divisions in the church, accusing some of "heresy hunting". and in 1913 was appointed to the Dorcas Street, South Melbourne church. He resigned in October 1916 to return to South Australia to take charge of the Alberton church.

Hughes was president of the South Australian Baptist Church Missionary Society in 1920 and president of the Baptist Union 1921.

=== Activism ===
Hughes was the epitome of muscular Christianity, a virile man with an attractive personality, admired particularly by young men. As a youth he was a keen and successful cricketer and lacrosse player, and in later years a keen bowls player and a prominent member of the Alberton Bowling Club. Hughes was an ardent Prohibitionist: president of the S.A. Band of Hope Union and an active member of the South Australian Alliance. In June 1923 he relinquished the pulpit to succeed Rev. R. Ambrose Roberts as leader of its field staff, and became editor of The Patriot (Note: The Patriot was founded in 1920 by Frank Lade as official organ of the South Australian Prohibition League, or South Australian Alliance as it was then known, and shortly edited by R. Ambrose Roberts.) around the same time. He relinquished both the editorship and field work in August 1927.

=== Return to ministry ===
In May 1928 he succeeded Rev. E. R. Thorne as pastor of the Goodwood Baptist Church. In 1930 he suffered ill-health and took six months' leave to visit Great Britain and Europe. On his return, accompanied by Rev. W. F. Nash of Mitcham, the subject of his sermons was not temperance but the Second Advent. In 1936 he resigned to take charge of the Knightsbridge church, and retired in March 1939, his health still problematical.

He died at his home 31 Tusmore Avenue Leabrook, and his remains interred at the Centennial Park Cemetery following a service at Knightsbridge Baptist Church.

== Family ==
Hughes married Stella Emily Fenn on 10 February 1904. Their family included:

- James Estcourt Hughes (24 November 1904 – 17 February 1996) wrote a biography of Henry Simpson Newland.
- Lorna Hope Hughes (8 May 1906 – 4 January 1942) married John Herbert Cant on 30 March 1935.
- Gordon Kingsley Hughes (27 May 1908 – 10 February 1955) married Jean Alice (Alice Joan?) McKenzie in 1938. He was Senior Lecturer in Organic Chemistry in the University of Sydney from 1944.
- D(ouglas) Lloyd Hughes (12 July 1918 – 8 September 2009) married Helen Dankel on 6 February 1943.

== Publications ==
- Hughes, H. E. (1933) The Second Advent of Our Lord Gillingham & Co., Adelaide
- Hughes, H. E. (1937) Our First Hundred Years: The Baptist Church of South Australia SA Baptist Union, Adelaide
