= Matthew Henry Hodge =

Congregationalist minister (1805–1877)

Rev. Matthew Henry Hodge (1805 – 13 January 1877) was a Congregationalist minister who had a substantial career in South Australia, being pastor of the Port Adelaide Congregational Church for 27 years.

== History ==
Hodge was born in South Molton, Devon, England.

He arrived in South Australia with his wife and family aboard the John Munn from London in September 1849, and founded the first Independent (as Congregationalists were wont to style themselves) church in the Port area, which first met in a sail loft in Wills Street. The boys resumed their education at a school at the Port run by a Mr. Perry, then attended John L. Young's Adelaide Educational Institution, where (named as Edward, Francis and Payne) they won prizes in 1853 and 1854.

The first chapel was built on a small block of land donated by Captain Hall at Alberton (or Albert Town), but soon proved too small for the large non-denominational congregation. A new chapel was built on swampland bounded by St. Vincent Street and Lipson Street, and Rev. Hodge conducted services at the two locations until Rev. G. D. Watt arrived to take over at Alberton. Notwithstanding the founding of churches by the Baptists and (Wesleyan) Methodists in the area, Hodge's congregation had outgrown the building, and land adjoining on the western side was secured for a new Port chapel. The builder Walter Smith was contracted and in 1851 the foundation stone was laid, but construction was held up by the Victorian gold rush, when just about every able-bodied man (including Rev. Hodge and many of his congregation) left for the diggings. The workers returned, and the building and schoolhouse were completed. Rev. Hodge did not strike gold, but collected £1000 from some of those who had. The chapel was opened for services, and the schoolhouse was used during the week by Thomas Caterer for his private school. The chapel was however largely destroyed on 30 April 1866 when the shingle roof caught fire.

A large block of land on St. Vincent Street was purchased for a new chapel and on 16 July 1867 the foundation stone of the present building was laid, and the chapel opened for services in 1868. It is a tribute to the organizational powers and personality of Rev. Hodge that at his death the church was free of debt.

His replacement at the Port was Rev. (Matthew) MacKinnon Dick, previously at Alma, but was in poor health and died in 1880. The Rev. Joseph Coles Kirby followed in 1882, and served for a similarly long 28 years.

== Family ==
Matthew Henry Hodge married Eleanor Honeyman Payne (17 January 1809 – 18 March 1873). Their family included:

- Sarah Emily Hodge (1835 – 27 November 1862) married William Whyte ( – ) in 1862
- George Payne Hodge (1838 – 24 August 1899) married Elizabeth Ridley (1841 – 1 February 1906) in 1865. Elizabeth was a daughter of William Ridley of Blaydon-on-Tyne.
- Francis Daniel Hodge (5 June 1839 – 19 November 1894) married Eliza Evans (10 June 1846 – 18 July 1932) in 1866
- Henry Edward Hodge (20 January 1842 – 5 January 1898) married Annie Hosier Batten (17 October 1859 – 22 January 1939) in 1888. He was manager of the National Bank, Clare. Annie married again, to (Methodist) Rev. Sampson Stephens in 1904.
