= Working Women's Trades Union =

South Australian women's trade union

Working Women's Trades Union was a trade union established in Adelaide, South Australia, in January 1890 to organise women workers and address poor wages and working conditions. Its formation followed a campaign by social reformers and trade unionists, including Mary Lee and Augusta Zadow, to establish an organisation for women employed in textile industries affected by the practice known as "sweating". The union was associated with the United Trades and Labour Council of South Australia. It also addressed conditions affecting children in employment.

== Formation ==
A public meeting was held in the Adelaide Town Hall on 11 December 1889 to consider the inequities of women workers "sweating" in factories. Mary Lee proposed that the attendees form a women's trade union. The proposal called for the United Trades and Labour Council of South Australia to work with a committee to establish a female trade union.

A public meeting of female workers was held at the Rechabite Hall in Grote Street on 14 January 1890. According to a report in the South Australian Register the following day, approximately 100 women and 30 men attended the meeting to organise the women's trades union. There is some discrepancy over the exact date the union established and officially formed, but most records indicate that in March 1890 women were invited to join the union. Mary Lee was founding Secretary and Augusta Zadow was the founding Treasurer.

== Activities ==
After the union's formation there was increased attention on the conditions women experienced when employed in factories, mainly for clothing and textiles workshops. At that time there was no legislation setting out hours of work or conditions, leading to what was colloquially known as "sweating". A commission was appointed to examine and record factory life for women. Zadow was one of the principal investigators, providing evidence on the conditions experienced by women workers. The inquiry formed part of wider efforts to introduce legislation regulating employment conditions. South Australia passed the Factories Act 1894, outlining the inspection of factories and the regulation of working conditions.

Zadow was appointed as South Australia's first female factory inspector in 1894. Her responsibilities included inspecting factories, workshops and dressmakers and investigating matters related to wages, safety and sanitary conditions. Zadow resigned from her union position when appointed inspector.

== Women's suffrage ==
The union's activities were connected with the campaign for women's suffrage in South Australia. Lee and Zadow were active in the labour movement and the women' suffrage movement. Lee argued that improvements in women's employment conditions should be accompanied by political representation.

In 1894 the South Australian Parliament passed legislation granting women the right to vote and stand for election in the parliament. The Working Women's Trades Union was one of the organisations involved in the suffrage campaign, alongside the Women's Suffrage League and the Women's Christian Temperance Union.

== See also ==
- Mary Lee
- Augusta Zadow
- United Trades and Labour Council of South Australia
- Women's suffrage in Australia
