= Robert Caldwell (Australian politician) =

Australian politician

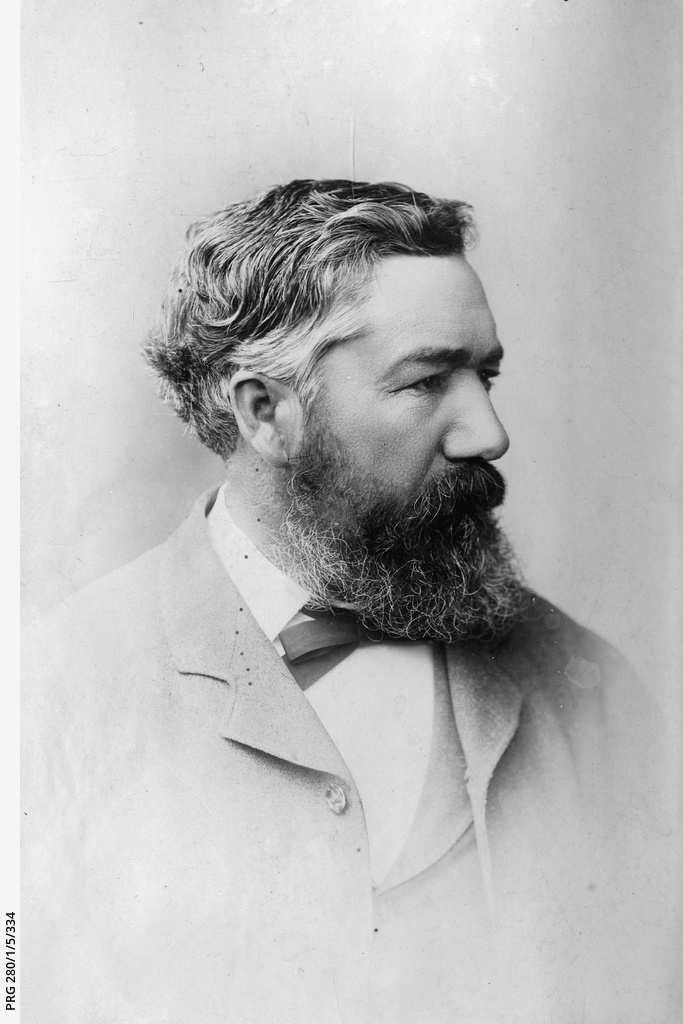
Robert Caldwell, Member of Parliament and Chairman of the Pastoral Lands Commission in South Australia 1894, State Library of South Australia PRG-280-1-5-334

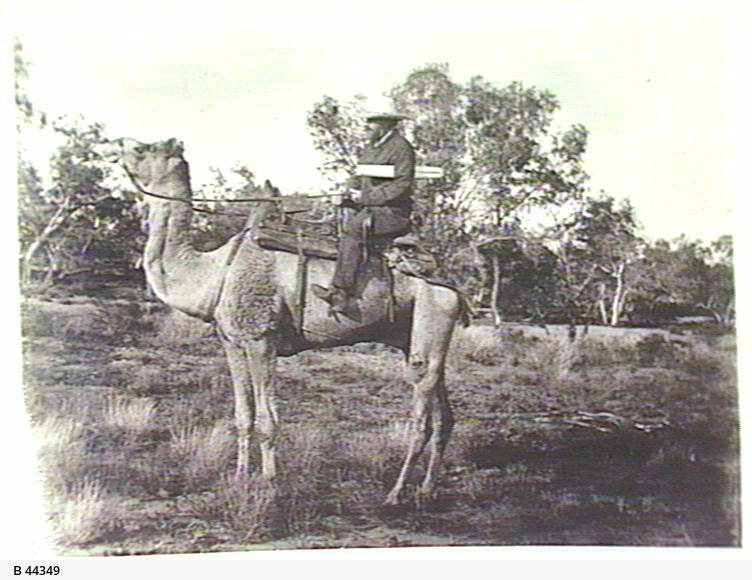
Robert Caldwell, M. P. Chairman of the Pastoral Lands Commission, State Library of South Australia B-44349. Original held at Parliamentary Library

Robert Caldwell (4 August 1843 – 2 November 1909), occasionally referred to as "poet Caldwell", was a South Australian politician. He was a member of the South Australian House of Assembly from 1884 to 1902, representing the electorates of Yorke Peninsula (1884-1890) and Onkaparinga (1890-1902).

== Early life ==
Caldwell was born in Stevenston, Ayrshire, Scotland and immigrated to South Australia with his family in 1849 when he was just six years old. The family was among the earliest settlers at Alma Plains, and also lived at Mount Templeton, north of Whitwarta. After leaving school, he farmed on Yorke's Peninsula and at Woodside. before entering politics, and was Clerk of the Onkaparinga District Court.

Caldwell was a Methodist lay preacher and popular lecturer in the temperance cause, and a member of the Temperance Alliance throughout his life.

He wrote many articles and poems on topical themes for The South Australian Register and, especially, The Mount Barker Courier.

== Politics ==
Caldwell was elected to the South Australian House of Assembly as the member for Yorke Peninsula in 1884, transferring to Onkaparinga in 1890. He served until 1902.

He contested the single statewide seven-member Division of South Australia at the 1901 federal election as a Protectionist Party candidate but finished ninth.

Whilst in parliament Caldwell was briefly secretary to the Opposition, and was instrumental in securing the appointment of several Commissions to enquire into issues related to the agricultural industry.

Caldwell's conservative political views grew stronger to the extent he lost touch with the majority of the people and resulted in his unsuccessful attempt to secure a seat in the Federal Senate.

== Women's Suffrage ==
Caldwell was an active member of the Women's Suffrage League and consistently presented and supported Bills to extend the franchise to women. On one point his conservative views caused him to disagree with the League as Caldwell believed only women of property should be allowed to vote, rather than all women which was the League's position. Caldwell kept the issue at the forefront of debate in Parliament through separate franchise bills in 1888, 1889 and 1890. Reporting on parliamentary debates and subsequent discussions in the wider society thus provided opportunities for the Women's Suffrage League to strengthen their campaigning, which led to South Australian women receiving the vote in 1894.

Mary Lee, a founding member and Honorary Secretary of the Women's Suffrage League, described Caldwell as a courageous champion of the League for his persistence in keeping the issue before Parliament.

== Publications ==
- Caldwell, Robert (1876) The Australian Year, and other poems Offices of The Chronicle
- Caldwell, Robert (1881) The Philosopher, or Fragments of a Nineteenth Century Drama Advertiser and Chronicle, Adelaide also available online
- Caldwell, Robert (1890) Interpretations and musings Burden & Bonython, Adelaide
- Caldwell, Robert (c. 1899) The Pioneers and Other Poems E. S. Wigg & Son, price 1/6d.
- Caldwell, Robert (1900) Summer Fruits and Autumn Flowers J.L. Bonython & Co., Adelaide
