= Hector McLennan =

Australian suffragist

Hector McLennan was a Scottish Australian Suffragist and ship merchant.

Born in Glasgow, McLennan emigrated to South Australia where he was co-secretary of the Women's Suffrage League with Mary Lee.

McLennan was Manager and South Australian representative of Messers Howard W Smith and Sons and in 1900 moved to Victoria to manage its Melbourne office. He later opened a Melbourne Office for coal merchants James and Alexander Brown of Newcastle, New South Wales.

McLennan died in Armadale, Victoria on 4 December 1923 after a long illness. He left a widow and four married daughters.
