= South Australian Women's Suffrage Petition =

Petition presented to the Parliament of South Australia in 1894

The South Australian Women's Suffrage Petition of 1894 was a document signed by around 11,600 people in support of extending the right to vote to women in the colony of South Australia. Presented to the House of Assembly on 23 August 1894 by Member of Parliament George Stanley Hawker, the petition contained signatures from across the state and measured about 120 m (390 ft) in length. It contributed to the passage of the Constitutional Amendment (Adult Suffrage) Act 1894, which, after intense deliberation, was amended by former Premier Ebenezer Ward to also allow women to stand for parliament. Although Ward intended to derail the Bill, the amendment was carried, granting South Australian women both the right to vote and to stand for parliament, making the colony the first jurisdiction in the world to legislate both rights on equal terms.

== Background ==
There were many unsuccessful attempts in South Australia to legislate voting rights for women between 1886 and 1894.

The campaign for women's voting rights in South Australia was led by the Women's Suffrage League, established in 1888 following efforts by the earlier Ladies' Social Purity Society. Other influential groups included the Woman's Christian Temperance Union (WCTU) and the Working Women's Trade Union.

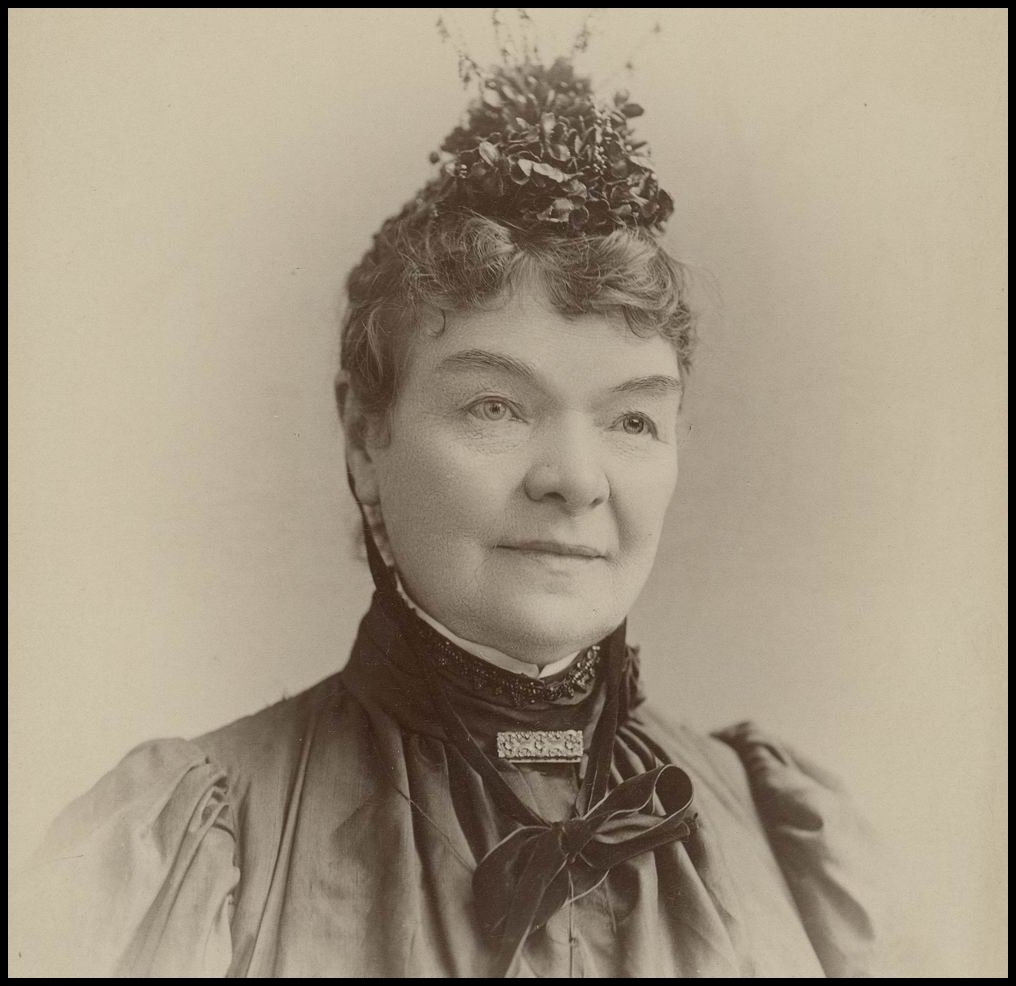
Portrait of Mary Lee, a South Australian suffragist.

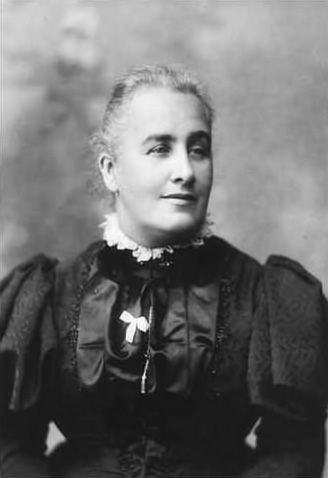
Portrait of Elizabeth Webb Nicholls, a South Australian suffragist.

Led by Mary Lee and Elizabeth Webb Nicholls, these organisations campaigned tirelessly across the colony: holding meetings, distributing leaflets and newspapers, organising public debates and rallies, encouraging letter-writing, lobbying male politicians, and engaging directly with local communities during meetings and events. From April to August 1894 a state-wide petition was created, with Mary Lee travelling to regional towns as well as urban centres, talking at meetings and securing signatures from a wide geographic area, reflecting substantial grassroots support.

The South Australian campaign shared similarities with other suffrage movements in Australia, notably the Victorian Women's Suffrage Petition of 1891, often referred to as the Monster Petition due to its size of nearly 260 m (850 ft) and more than 30,000 signatures. Like the South Australian petition, it was organised by women's advocacy groups, principally the Victorian Women's Suffrage Society and the WCTU, and relied on extensive grassroots canvassing across metropolitan and rural districts. While the Victorian petition did not achieve immediate legislative change, it demonstrated the political influence of mass petitions and informed the South Australian movement's approach in 1894.

=== The petition ===
On 23 August 1894, George Stanley Hawker, Member for North Adelaide, presented to the House of Assembly a petition in favour of women's suffrage. It contained approximately 11,600 signatures, collected from both metropolitan and country areas of South Australia, making it the largest petition ever presented to the Parliament of South Australia - about 120 m (390 ft) in length when pages were joined end to end.

=== Legislative impact ===
The petition was submitted by Hawker during the third reading debate of the Constitutional Amendment (Adult Suffrage) Bill, which aimed to extend the voting rights to women on the same terms as men. During the debate, former Premier Ebenezer Ward, who opposed women's suffrage, moved an amendment to remove a clause explicitly barring women from sitting in Parliament. Ward intended the amendment to make the bill unacceptable to other parliamentary members and thereby prevent its passage.

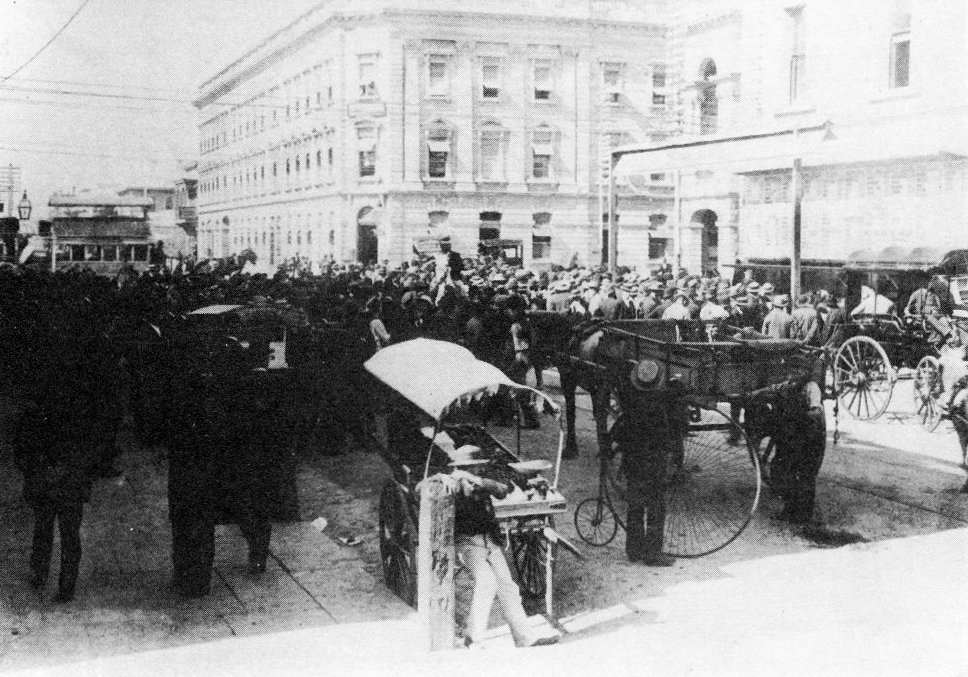
Election day in Adelaide, 25 April 1896 – the first Australian election and referendum in which women could cast a vote. Image shows crowds outside the offices of The Advertiser on Waymouth Street in Adelaide. The election results are posted on boards on the wall to the right. Photographer unknown

Following intense deliberation across both houses, the amendment was carried by 31 votes to 14 (3 votes more than the required majority). The Constitutional Amendment (Adult Suffrage) Act 1894 was passed on 18 December 1894. This granted South Australian women not only the right to vote but also the right to stand for election to parliament, making South Australia the first place in the world to legislate and provide both these rights equally to women.

Premier Charles Kingston described it as the "greatest constitutional reform". Despite her derision of the legislation, Queen Victoria signed the Act and gave royal assent on 21 March 1895. South Australian women went to the polls and voted for the first time on 25 April 1896.

The wording of the Constitution Amendment (Adult Suffrage) Act was very brief and listed in three points:

1. The right to vote for persons to sit in Parliament as members of the Legislative Council, and the right to vote for persons to sit in Parliament as members of the House of Assembly, are hereby extended to women.
2. Women shall possess and may exercise the rights hereby granted, subject to the same qualifications and in the same manner as men.
3. All Constitution and Electoral Acts and all other laws are hereby amended, so far as may be necessary to give effect to this Act.

The Law meant that all women and men in South Australia, including the Indigenous men and women, now had full rights to vote.

=== Significance ===
The petition served as a pivotal demonstration of widespread public backing for women's suffrage in South Australia. Its scale and impact helped overcome prior failed attempts and ultimately advanced one of the most inclusive and progressive electoral reforms of its time.

== Legacy ==
The South Australian Women's Suffrage Petition of 1894 played a critical role in achieving one of the world's most progressive electoral reforms of the 19th century. Its unprecedented scale and the broad geographic representation of its signatories demonstrated widespread public support for women's political rights, helping to overcome multiple earlier legislative failures.

The passage of the Constitutional Amendment (Adult Suffrage) Act 1894 not only enfranchised women but also allowed them to stand for parliament, making South Australia the first jurisdiction globally to grant both rights equally. This set a powerful precedent, inspiring other Australian colonies and countries to pursue similar reforms.

The petition itself is preserved as a significant historical artefact. The original is held by the South Australian House of Assembly, while a master photocopy and a searchable index of signatories are maintained by the State Records of South Australia and the Centre of Democracy. These resources continue to serve as valuable tools for historians, educators, and descendants researching family and community involvement in the suffrage movement.

== See also ==
- Feminism in Australia
- Women's suffrage in Australia
- List of suffragists and suffragettes
- List of Australian suffragists
- List of women's rights activists
- Timeline of women's suffrage
- Voting rights of Indigenous Australians
- Women and government in Australia
