= Broken Hill Women's Memorial =

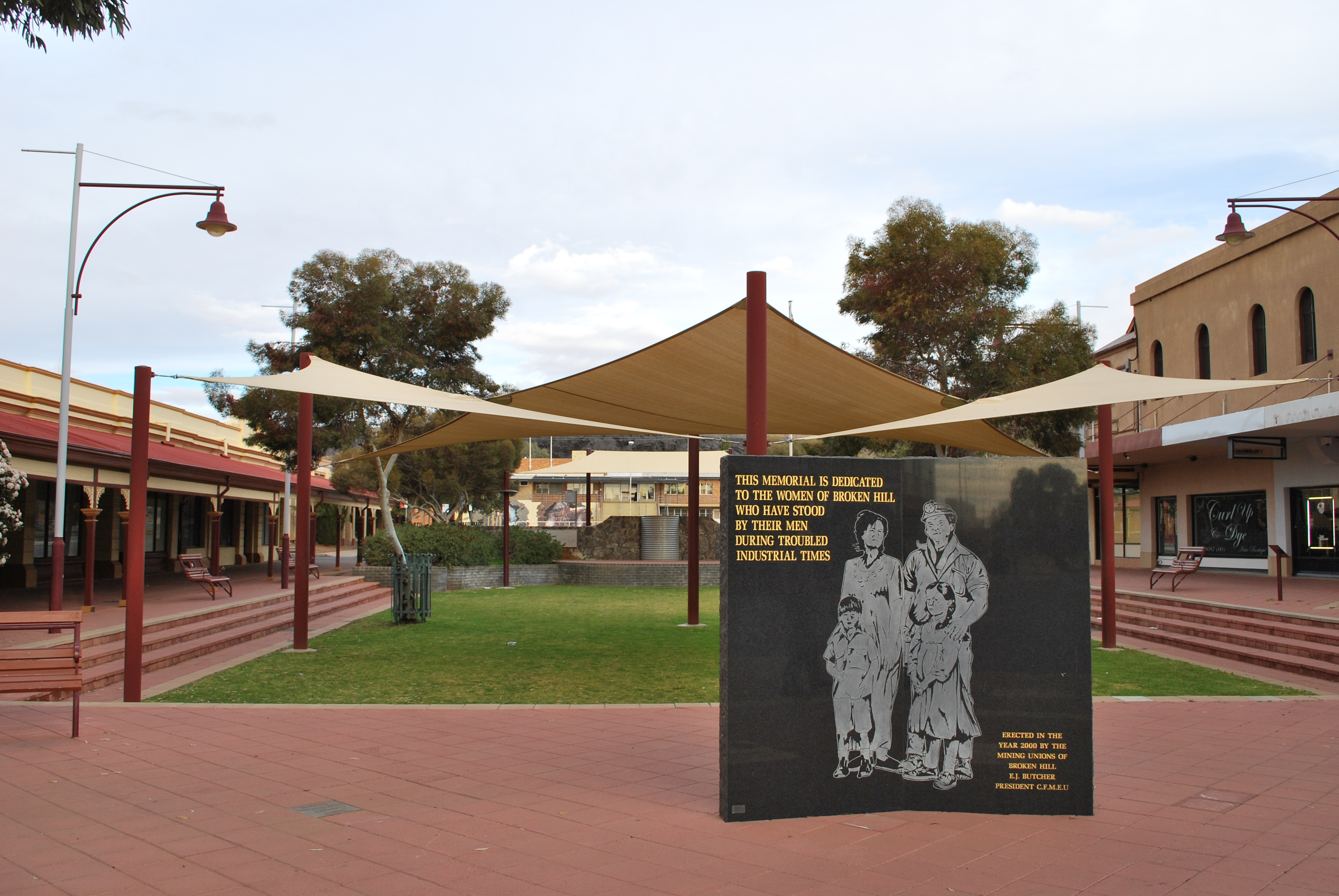
- Year: 2001
- Type: Black granite
- Location: Broken Hill, New South Wales, Australia; 31°57′30″S 141°27′57″E

Broken Hill Women's Memorial is located in the Town Square of Broken Hill, New South Wales, Australia, and honours the contribution of women to the Broken Hill community. In particular, it acknowledges the work of women who supported the town's miners during long and difficult strikes and industrial disputes. Some of these women organised themselves into the Women's Brigade (Broken Hill). Their work included picketing outside the mine, organising protest marches and rallies, and tarring and feathering non-unionised workers (strikebreakers, known as scabs) who tried to enter the mine during strikes.

The memorial was partially funded from a surplus of money raised by the women of Broken Hill during an industrial dispute at the mine in 1986. As had been the case in previous strikes in 1892 and 1919, the women of the town supported the men by organising financial support, as well as providing ongoing moral support and encouragement. When the 1986 dispute ended and the women's fund still held $1,000, it was decided to use the money to build a memorial. The balance of the funds was provided by the miners' union.

The memorial is built from two pieces of black granite and was constructed by Zanon Memorials. It depicts an image of a family and two pieces of text.

The unveiling ceremony took place on 30 March 2001, and was performed by Martin Ferguson, Shadow Minister for Regional Development, Transport, Infrastructure, Regional Services and Population. The president of the Construction, Forestry, Mining and Energy Union, Eddie Butcher, was also present and dedicated the memorial with the words "[Women] were the unsung heroes as they stood by their men, through the toughest and darkest hours of mining history. Women are the backbone of Broken Hill's society and they truly deserve the recognition that this monument will give them."
