= Port Adelaide Uniting Church =

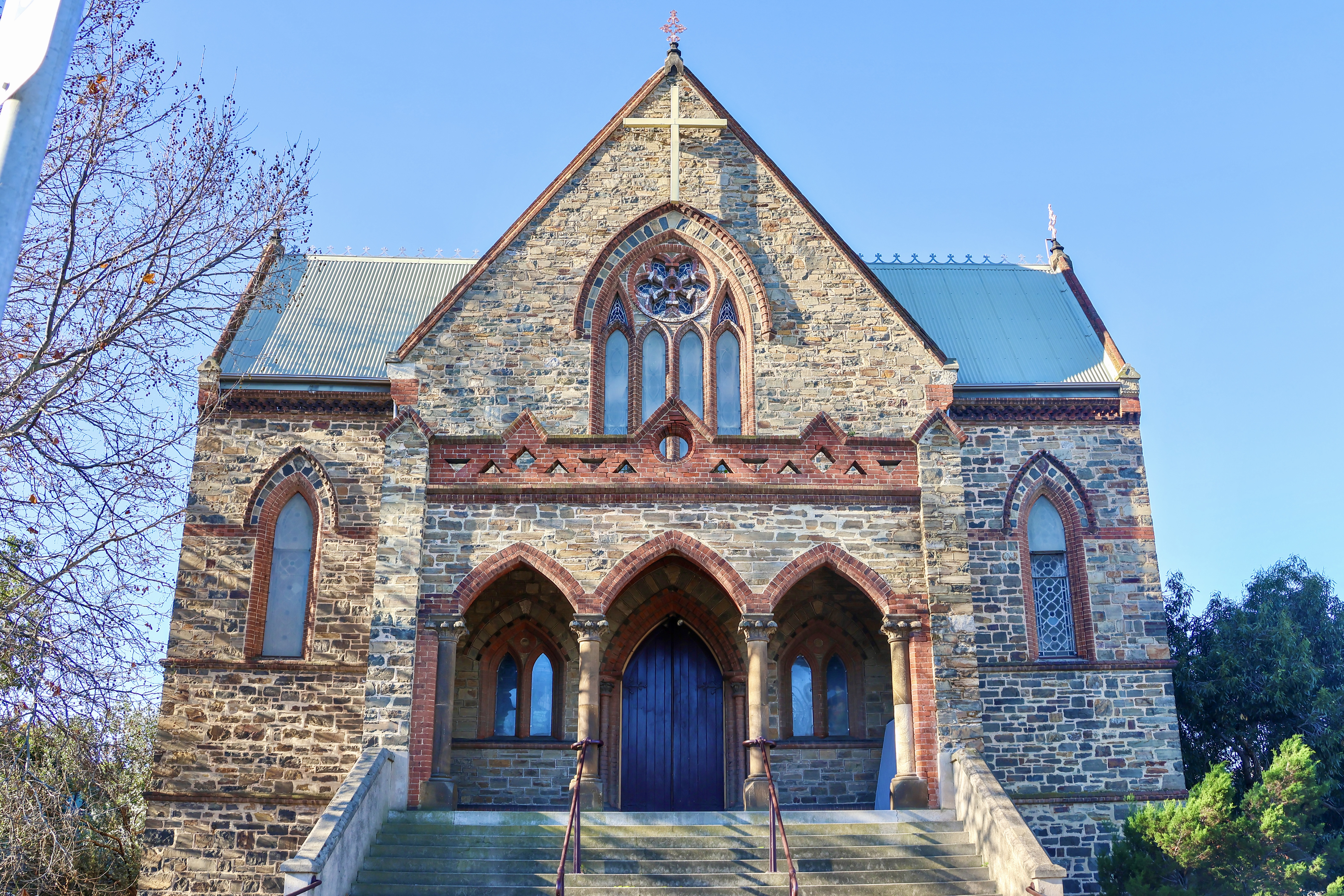
- The Port Adelaide Uniting Church in 2026
- Port Adelaide Uniting Church
- 34°50′49″S 138°30′27″E
- Location: Port Adelaide
- Country: Australia
- Denomination: Uniting Church in Australia
- Previous denomination: Congregational Union of Australia
- Website: portadelaide.unitingchurch.org.au

History
- Founded: 1849

Architecture
- Heritage designation: State heritage place
- Designated: 11 June 1998
- Architect: James Macgeorge
- Style: Gothic
- Years built: 1867-1868

Specifications
- Capacity: 500

The Port Adelaide Uniting Church is located in Port Adelaide, South Australia. It is an active church, with worship and prayer each week.

== History ==
The life of the church congregation began in 1849, when a group of Christians from various denominations, who had been meeting informally in a sail loft in Port Adelaide, formed themselves into the 'Congregational Church of Port Adelaide'. The services were led by Rev. Matthew Hodge who was asked to cut-short his journey to Victoria (from England) and stay in South Australia instead. His first service was held on 30 September 1849 in the sail loft, but later that year a small stone church was built on the corner of St Vincent and Lipson Streets.

The congregation met in three different buildings before the present church was built between 1867-1868. It was reported that this early community, "fostered such an ecumenical spirit that there are even reports of Jews attending its meetings in Port Adelaide".

In 1978 the church became part of the Uniting Church in Australia.

== The church building ==
The church was designed by James Macgeorge and is built from Dry Creek sandstone with very elaborate brickwork. Macgeorge’s design included a tower and spire but these were never built. Since 1998, the church has been listed on the South Australian Heritage Register.

The interior seats 500 and is of traditional Christian church design with a high ceiling and Gothic styling. There is a large gallery across the back of the church and the original pipe organ at the front, which has been restored to its original colours.

In 1901 the Young Men's Christian Society hall was added to the rear of the church and, as an extension to the main building, the first Montessori Kindergarten in South Australia was built in 1912. This room is still used for children's education and play.

== Historical figures ==
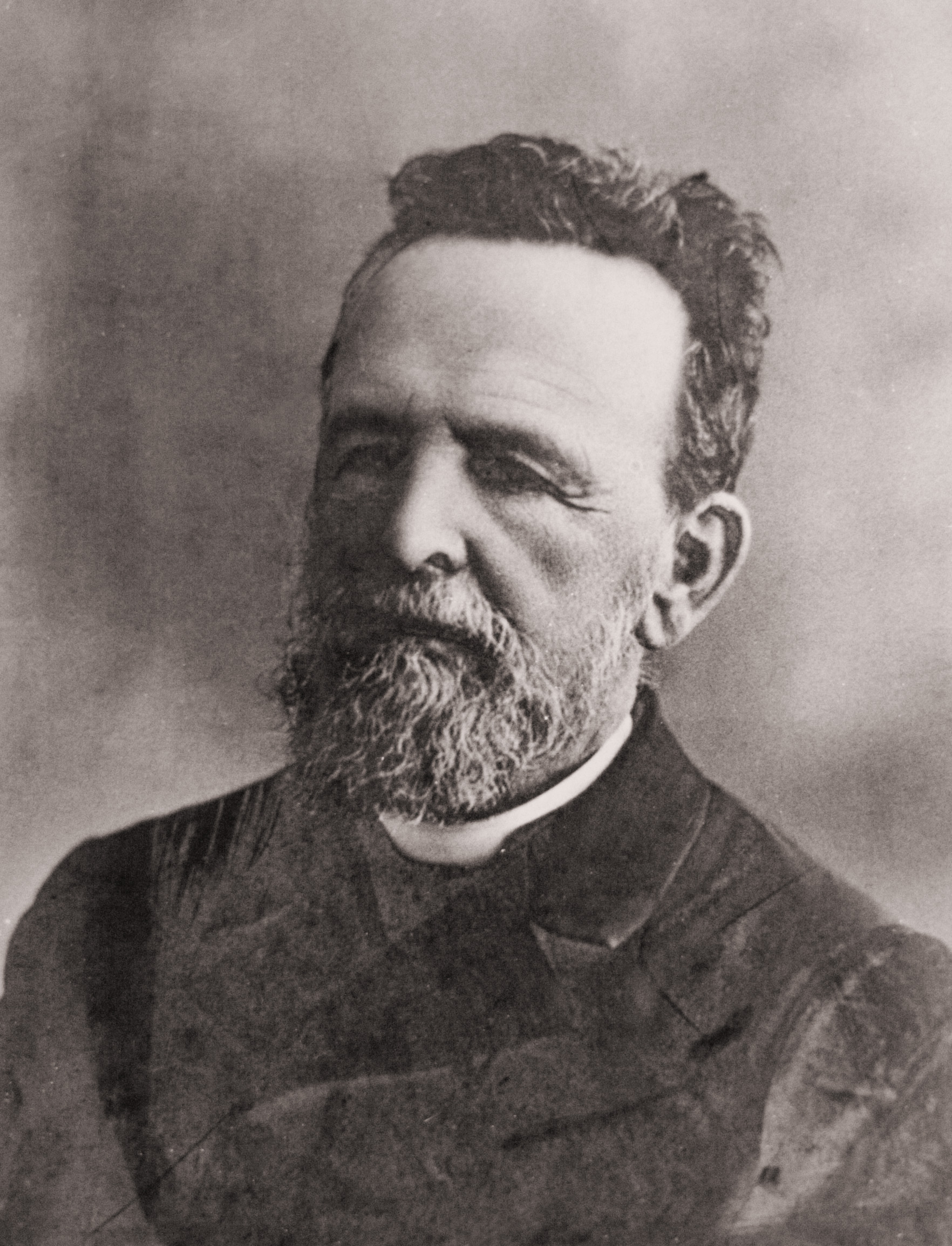
Joseph Coles Kirby ~1890 when he was the minister for the church.

Many of the prominent citizens of the Port were associated with the church and the walls of the church are covered with memorial plaques that give a commentary on the life of the church itself.

The first minister of the church was Rev. Matthew Hodge who served from 1849 until his death from typhoid fever in 1877. Rev. Michael Dick was the next minister, serving the next three years until he died of consumption.

The third and most famous minister at the church was Rev. J.C. Kirby who served from 1880 to 1908. Kirby is best remembered for his activities in the temperance movement where he shut down one third of the Port Adelaide hotels but was also an outstanding teacher and public figure whose achievements include setting up the Young Christians' Union, the Young Men's Christian Society and supporting the Women's Suffrage Movement.

== See also ==
- Uniting Church in Australia
