= Hindmarsh Cemetery =

Cemetery in Charles Sturt City, South Australia

Details
- Location: 32 Adam Street, Hindmarsh, South Australia
- Coordinates: 34°54′41″S 138°33′55″E
- Owned by: City of Charles Sturt
- No. of graves: >15,000
- Website: http://www.charlessturt.sa.gov.au/Cemeteries
- Find a Grave: Hindmarsh Cemetery

Hindmarsh Cemetery is located on the corner of Adam Street and South Road, Hindmarsh, South Australia and bounded by the River Torrens to the south.

The cemetery and Sexton's cottage were included in the South Australian Heritage Register on 23 November 1989.

== History ==
The cemetery was originally planned and operated by committee appointed by the residents of Hindmarsh. A report in The Observer of 30 May 1846 noted that 2 acres were set aside for a cemetery, although the first burial occurred in the preceding month.

Control of the cemetery effectively passed to the Hindmarsh Council, with the first Cemetery Committee on 2 March 1927.

=== Interments ===
The first burial was of Edward Hughes of Hindmarsh on 21 April 1846.

- Thomas Henry Brooker, (1850–1927) salesman, wood-merchant and politician
- Thomas Hardy, (1830–1912) winemaker
- Job Hallett, (1855–1940) brickmaker
- George Henry Michell, (~1832–1918) wool processing
- Agnes Anderson Milne, (1851–1919) factory inspector
- Edward Charles Vardon, (1866–1937) manufacturer and politician
- Joseph Vardon, (1843–1913) printer and politician
