= 1892 Broken Hill miners' strike =

Labour dispute in Broken Hill, New South Wales, Australia

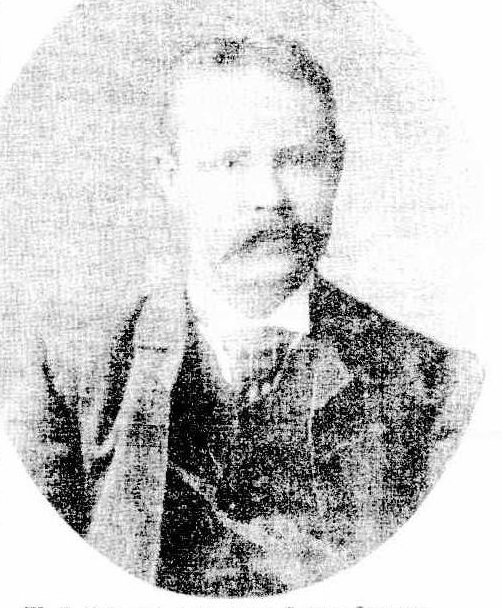
W.J. Ferguson one of the labour leaders

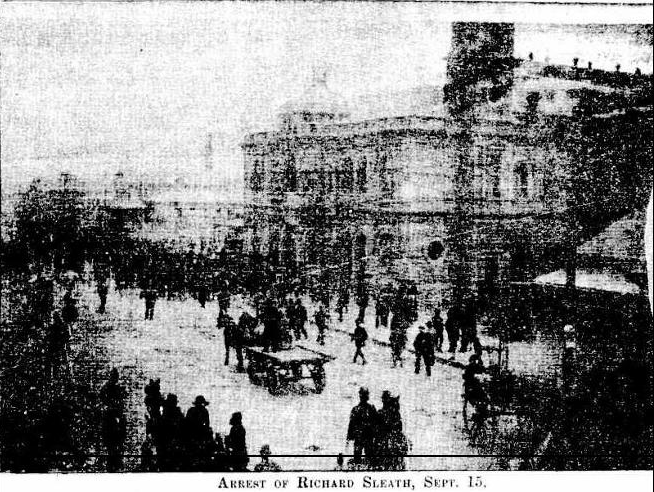
Arrest of the Leaders 15 September 1892

The 1892 Broken Hill miners' strike was a sixteen-week strike which was one of four major strikes that took place between 1889 and 1920 in Broken Hill, NSW, Australia.

During the four months from July to November 1892, both local miners and Women's Brigade were active in defending the mines from imported labour using organised direct action methods.

The strike collapsed after several strike leaders were arrested and tried for 'unlawful conspiracy and inciting riots', found guilty and sentenced to imprisonment and it became unpracticable for locals to defend the mines from imported labour.

== History ==
Broken Hill developed as a mining town in the arid north-west of New South Wales near the Barrier Ranges after Charles Rasp, then a boundary rider/station hand for the Mount Gipps sheep station studied a 'black craggy hilltop' which he believed to contain black oxide of tin. The first shaft (the Rasp Shaft) was sunk on this hill in January 1885 with the Broken Hill Mining Company formed on 25 April, becoming The Broken Hill Proprietary Company Limited on 3 June 1885. It is for this hill (since mined away) that the town is named.

The original introduction of unionism in the area was through a meeting at the Adelaide Club Hotel in Silverton on 20 September 1884 with the resolution 'That this meeting deem it advisable to form a Miners' Association, to be called the Barrier Ranges Miners' Association', and with the object to form 'a Friendly Society, to afford succor to members who sustained injury as the result of a mining accident.'

Following the adoption of Trade Union Acts throughout Australian states in this decade, a further meeting was held at Silverton on 12 January 1886 where it was decided to reconstitute the organisation as branch of the Amalgamated Miners' Association of Australasia. The branch was later transferred to Broken Hill where the mining population had grown to 3000. At this time it was estimated that unionists out-numbered non-unionists in the town by a factor of 7:1.

Broken Hill's first mining strike occurred in 1889 as a result of the trade union ultimatum that members not be made to work with non-unionised workers. The strike lasted a week and during this time the Women's Brigade was formed. In the following year, in an attempt to achieve 100% unionism for Australian workers, major strikes of the Maritime unions and Shearing unions erupted. While mining shut down as a result of the wharf closures preventing supplies from reaching Broken Hill, the maritime dispute ended in defeat and work resumed at Broken Hill within the month

As economic depression threatened Australia in 1892 and the values of silver and lead (mined at Broken Hill) declined, the Broken Hill companies attempted to increase profits through the use of contract workers. This resulted in the 1892 Broken Hill miners' strike as it was a direct breach of the terms of the 1890 trades agreement.

== The Strike ==
=== Conditions ===
According to Unbroken Spirit, 'Poor living conditions and negligent managerial policy on the mines at Broken Hill fed into a strong union presence from the very early days'. Women and children found life in the mining town harsh, yet fought alongside the miners in favour of the union goals despite the hardship prolonged strikes caused to family welfare.

Blainey (1968) states that anxiety ran high in Broken Hill due to the living and working conditions which included the difficulty of mitigating the risk of lead poisoning and the danger of cave-in due to poorly excavated mines.

The decision to move from mining ore at Broken Hill in the late 1800s to open the Newcastle Steelworks in 1915 was due to the technical difficulty in developing a process to recover value from mining the 'lower-lying sulphide ores'. As a result of the delay in establishing this technology, 'huge heaps of tailings and slimes up to 40 ft high' were left to build up around the town in the hope that an extraction method could be developed. This was not to occur for many years.

It was these tailings left in huge piles around the town that added to the toxic dust which caused lead poisoning and pneumoconiosis and added to the concerns of both the miners and their families.

Josiah Thomas who was elected to the presidency of the Barrier Branch of the Amalgamated Miners Association in 1892 used his influence with the NSW Labor Party to request a Board of Inquiry into the lead poisoning associated with the Broken Hill mines This Inquiry was under discussion at the committee on the eve of the strike.

=== Trade Act Clause Overturned ===
Union president Josiah Thomas had been successful in having radical candidates elected to local Council in an attempt to have the Council Rates paid by the mine owners increased. However, the mine owners were successful in appealing their current rate so that it was actually reduced (p27).

Union leaders including Thomas were sacked for being absent on union business at this time and it was felt that an attack on the unions was imminent. This appeared to be confirmed in the following actions of the Mine Managers Association (MMA).

'At a special meeting of the Barrier Ranges Mining Managers' Association (MMA) in the Masonic Hall on 6 May 1892 it was resolved':

That clause 4 of the 1890 Agreement (which confirmed the above rates of wages but provided for a reduction in the working week from 48 hours to 46) should be struck out of that Agreement, and further, that there should be no restriction on any work either underground or at the surface.

According to Laurent in Solomon (1988), the reason behind overturning this previously agreed-to clause was to take advantage of extra labour from other mines in an effort to offset reductions in profit caused by the slowing of the economy. However Blainey attributes the overturning of the clause without union consultation to an assumption that the miners would prefer to be paid by the amount of ore extracted (and thus retain some influence over their take home pay) than work less hours. Although Blainey does concede that both the miners and mine managers, in his opinion, had stronger cases than indicated in the formal grounds for dispute.

Blainey states that the union argued against contract mining on the basis that it had the potential to 'encouraged dangerous practices', penalise the weaker miners and created dissent between the miners through providing conditions where miners could earn greatly varying amounts depending on their abilities.

The unions were formally advised that termination of the 1889 and 1890 agreements would occur on 30 July 1892. This led to a 6000 strong meeting at the Central Reserve on 3 July which called for immediate strike action. On 16 August the mining companies issued a statement from Melbourne saying that on the mines would be open to non-union labour from 25 August and both sides became further entrenched within their own positions.

=== 25 August 1892 ===
Fearing an outbreak of violence against the strike-breakers, the mining companies sought and received the support of police in readiness for the opening of the mines. A crowd estimated at 10 000 had organised to be witness to the arrival of the strike-breakers. This included the Women's Brigade who were 'armed with sticks, broom handles and axe handles, set upon any man who attempted to pass through the union picket lines'.>

A street march was also held on the afternoon of the 25th led by Richard Sleath 'and a woman' on horseback which was accompanied by a brass marching band which led back through Argent St to the Central Reserve to receive speeches from several women and union leaders. Orators included Mrs Rogers & Urqhart.

=== Defeat ===
The first train load of contract workers arrived on 10 September 1892 and were met with violence and hostility from the local men and women. This conflict continued over the coming days and police resistance also escalated at a meeting of the Labour Defence Committee held at the Theatre Royal Hotel with the attendance of 30 police with fixed bayonets.

Seven strike leaders were arrested for conspiracy and inciting riot and tried at Deniliquin on 24 October 1892, presided over by judge Alfred Paxton Backhouse. All received sentences with Richard Sleath and Ferguson receiving two years each. The Secretary of the Union, Robert Augustine Hewitt was also arrested and sentenced to eighteen months imprisonment. Combined with the continuing influx of contract labour at the mines, the incarceration of the strike leadership and continuing hardship for striking workers resulted in a breakdown of the resistance against the introduction of contract labour.

The strike was officially abandoned on 8 November 1892 and the contract labour leading to the strike has remained at Broken Hill mines.

== Consequences ==
In addition to the introduction of contract miners, the defeat of the strike led to a 10 per cent decrease in wages and a restoration of a 48-hour work week.

The defeat of the 1892 Broken Hill miners' strike led to a collapse of credibility in the union movement in Broken Hill. Within two years, union membership had fallen from 6000 to 300 and faith in direct action methods also fell.

Along with the defeat of the 1890 Australian maritime dispute and the Shearers' Strikes of the 1890s, the defeat of the 1892 Broken Hill miners' strike was seen to lead to a loss of faith in union action alone to defend the interests of the working class. This led to increased electoral support for the Australian Labor Party based on their strong union affiliations.

Richard Sleath's imprisonment saw him emerge a martyr in 1893 and saw him elected to the Legislative Assembly for Wilcannia in 1894.
