= Women's Brigade (Broken Hill) =

Women's labour protest group in Australia

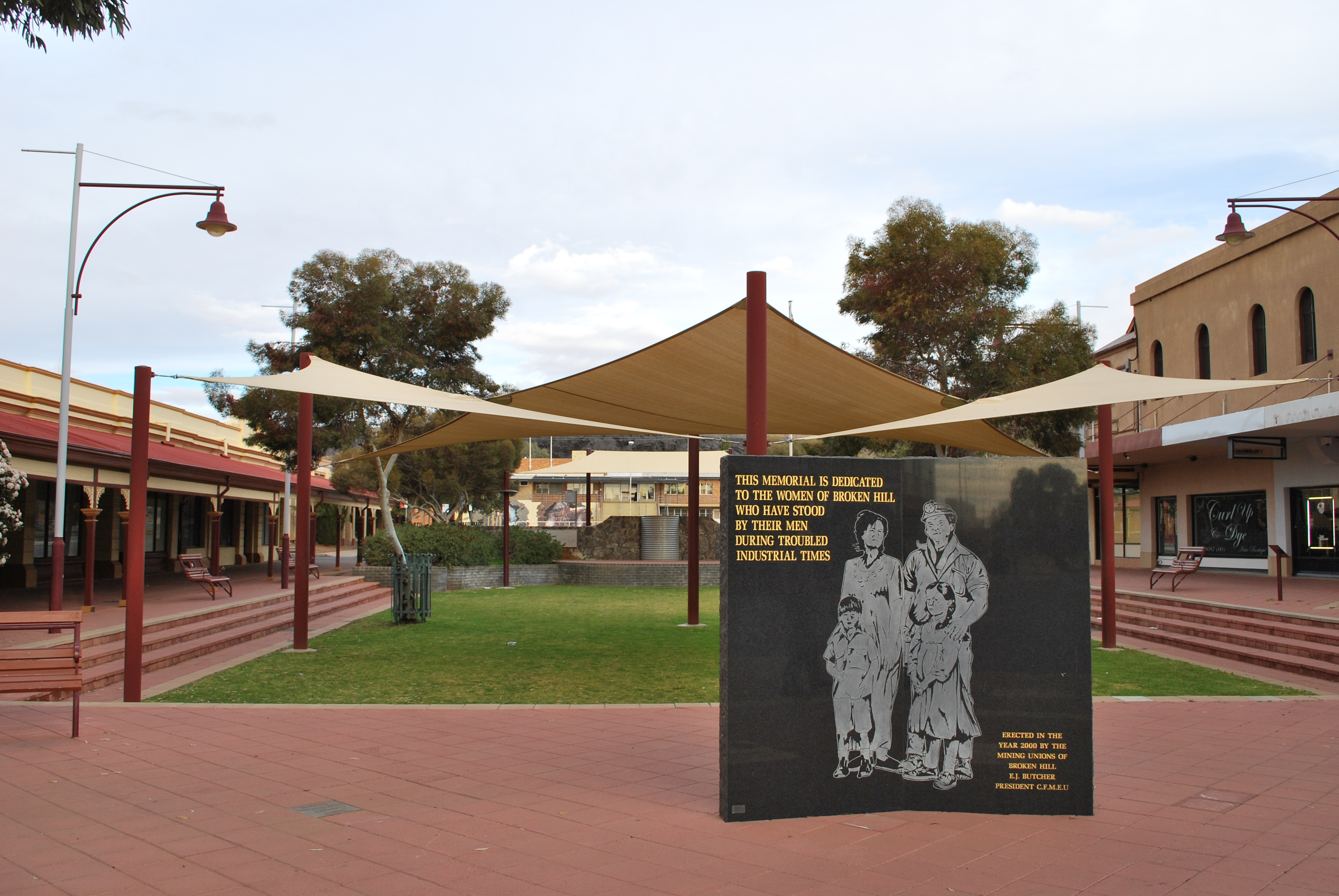
The Broken Hill Women's Memorial, dedicated to "the women of Broken Hill who have stood by their men during troubled industrial times".

The Women's Brigade was a labour protest organisation for women formed during the first of several strikes to occur in the mining town of Broken Hill, NSW, Australia between 1889–1920.

== History ==
=== Precedents ===
As early as 1874, Australian women were engaging in direct action in mining disputes in Australia. During the 1874 strikes at the Wallaroo and Moonta mines in South Australia, women entered the mines armed with brooms, forced the men out and closed down the engines.

=== The First Meeting ===
The notice for the first meeting read:

A number of Broken Hill Women are very anxious to do something towards supporting the men now out on strike and a meeting for women only will be held at the Masonic Hotel tonight, at 7:30. The president will be the chair. Mr T.C. Tait, the proprietor of the Masonic Hotel, has kindly given the use of his new hall, erected at the site of the hotel, for the use of the women's brigade. All matrons and maids who are in sympathy with the union are requested to attend.

== Conditions ==
According to Unbroken Spirit, 'Poor living conditions and negligent managerial policy on the mines at Broken Hill fed into a strong union presence from the very early days'. Women and children found life in the mining town harsh, yet fought alongside the miners in favour of the union goals despite the hardship prolonged strikes caused to family welfare.

According to Carroll (1986), and Blainey (1968) there was particular concern in the town regarding lead poisoning from the mine dust. Due to a long delay in developing the technical process for extracting value from the low-lying ores that were mined at Broken Hill, 40 ft high hills of toxic tailings were created about the mines and left without processing until the opening of the Newcastle BHP Steelworks in 1915.

== Activism ==
=== 1889 ===
Broken Hill's first mining strike occurred in 1889 as a result of the trade union ultimatum that members not be made to work with non-unionised workers. The strike lasted a week and during this time the Women's Brigade was formed.

By the time of the arrival of BHP directors from Melbourne on 13 November, the Women's Brigade had set up as 'sentinels' in order to catch any non-union labour, including shift bosses who were 'tarred and whitewashed' the following day while the 2500 miners met to negotiate the dispute with the directors.

A small number of men were injured by the Women's Brigade on 14 November. As a result of this Richard Sleath on behalf of the union distanced himself from their actions while mentioning the resolve of the women who had a week's worth of provisions and that they intended to remain on picket for the week. An appeal was made for the miners to use their influence with the women to calm their behaviour.

The brigade now numbers 400 members, many of whom took part in the famous sweeping affair at the Moonta and Wallaroo mines 15 years ago. Two hundred women spent the night in the mines and two of them have been locked up for trespassing.

=== 1892 ===
The Women's Brigade was very active in using direct action methods against the imported contract labour during the 1892 Broken Hill miners' strike. According to Bloodworth (1996), there were daily mass rallies and the Barrier United Females' Strike Protest Committee was formed in the initial weeks. The 500-strong Brigade passed a resolution to join the 24 August union demonstration but this was later abandoned in favour of a women's rally on the 25th.

Prominent suffragist Mary Lee publicly supported the women of Broken Hill, claiming that 'the women of Broken Hill are the first great body of working women who have raised their voices in united protest against the glaring injustice that the present constitution will not allow them a voice in framing the laws...' and that this rendered the 1892 Broken Hill miners' strike 'more profoundly interesting' than any before.

=== 1919-1920 ===
The womenfolk that evening at least got some of their own back, for wherever a 'cop' was observed during the march, he either received a 'back-hander' from a woman on passing or was spat upon. This happened not once, but hundreds of times during that memorable tramp through the city's streets. And, under the circumstances, show to me the workingman that did not, and does not, applaud such acts, and I will show you a creature who lives but to creep and to cringe, and knows but little of the history of his class, or the damnable actions of its historic enemies.
