= R. Ambrose Roberts =

Australian minister (c.1875–1945)

Robert Ambrose Roberts (c. 1875 – 24 May 1945), generally referred to as Ambrose Roberts or R. Ambrose Roberts, was a Congregational minister in Victoria, Australia, best known for his involvement in the temperance movement.

== History ==
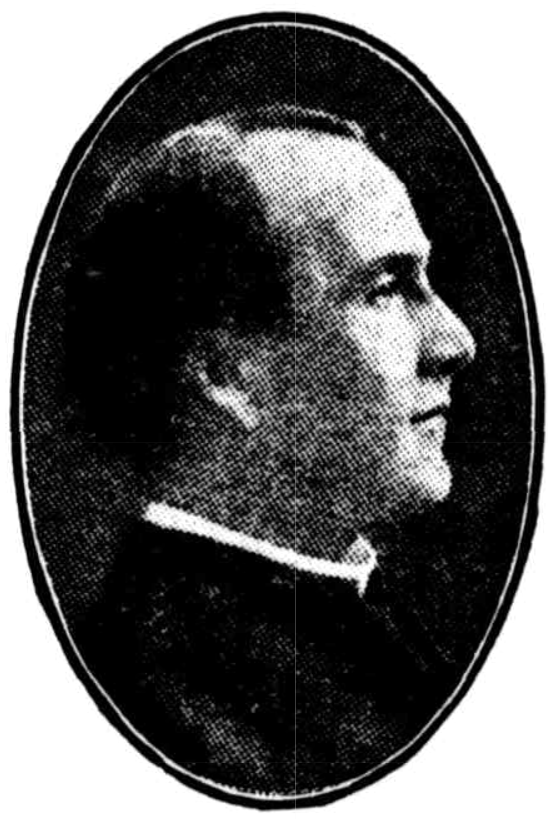
R. Ambrose Roberts

Roberts was a son Rev. Robert Thomas Roberts (c. 1829 – 13 May 1898), of the Welsh Church, Williamstown, Victoria, later of Maryborough, Victoria. and Eliza Roberts (died 15 October 1884). Roberts was born in Maldon, Victoria but was brought to Williamstown as a toddler, and lived there until he turned eighteen. He was educated at Scotch College. In 1894 the family moved to Maryborough, where his father took charge of the town's Welsh Presbyterian Church.

=== Congregationalism ===
Roberts began studying for the ministry, living in Williamstown with his sister Margaret Emily and her husband, Rev. J. J. Owen. He began his ministry in Maldon, followed by Bruthen, during which time he opened several new mission stations in East Gippsland. He ministered the church at Brunswick 1908–1909, where he was responsible for a great increase in church membership followed by Canterbury 1909–1918, achieving such an increase in membership that a new church building was erected. He declined an invitation to the church at Port Adelaide. He was elected president of the Congregational Union of Victoria for the year 1915-16. and chairman 1916–1917. He declined a call to the Milton Church in Brisbane in June 1916 but in July 1918 accepted a call to the Manthorpe Memorial Church in Adelaide as successor to J. Ernest James. His ministry was successful and he was hugely popular but left in March 1921 to succeed Rev Frank Lade (December 1868 – 9 October 1948) for a year as campaigner for the South Australian Alliance, (Note: Founded as the South Australian Temperance Alliance in 1884 as a joint project of the Total Abstinence League and Band of Hope Union in South Australia, the organisation subsequently celebrated October 10 as "Alliance Day". Premier F. W. Holder was a high profile member and president of the organisation in 1900, succeeding Dr S. J. Magarey.) working for the temperance cause and editor of The Patriot, its newspaper.

After two years working for the Alliance, in May 1923 he returned to church work in Victoria at the East Malvern Congregational Church.

In 1932 he was sued, along with several other officeholders of the Victorian Prohibition League, by lecturer Frederick Arlington Burke of St. Kilda, for £1500, claiming in Clarion Call that he ran, and profited from, a gambling saloon. Nothing further was reported on the case. He is reported as having at some time been editor of Clarion Call, the newspaper of Victorian prohibitionists.

He was known for his work as secretary of the Victorian Local Option Alliance for many years and later minister at Beaconsfleld.

He retired due to ill health, around November 1943.

== Family ==
He married Beatrice Senger, daughter of Leopold Senger (died 24 February 1913). They had three daughters: one of whom was born on 21 August 1909.

- Gweneth Irene Roberts ( – )
- Jean Vivian Roberts ( – ) married L. Pearson
- M(arjery) Olwen Roberts ( – ) married Max Guttensohn or Gutensohn, became osteopathic practitioner and academic.

They had a home at 91 Lucerne Crescent, Alphington, Victoria.

Siblings

He had a brother, John Roberts, and three sisters:

- Edith Eliza Roberts ( – 13 May 1949) married George Stamp ( – 19 August 1945) on 4 November 1901,
- Ada Roberts ( – 20 April 1908) married Griffith Hughes ( – 20 April 1908) (Note: Husband and wife were killed in the Sunshine rail disaster.)
- Margaret Emily Roberts ( – 9 June 1946) married Rev. John John Owen (c. 1860 – 3 July 1914). Owen was minister of the Welsh Church, Williamstown, for 23 years, and later of the Welsh Church, Latrobe Street, Melbourne. In 1910 Rev. Owen and his wife made headlines when sued for slander against a widow, Mrs Steele, who was acting as housekeeper for George Stamp, whose wife was living elsewhere.
