= Gordon Kingsley Hughes =

Australian scientist and academic

Gordon Kingsley "Bill" Hughes (27 May 1908 – 10 February 1955) was an Australian scientist and academic.

== History ==
Hughes was born in Adelaide, the third child and second son of (Baptist) Rev. Henry Estcourt Hughes and his wife Stella Emily Hughes, née Fenn, who married on 10 February 1904.

He was educated at Adelaide High School and the University of Adelaide, gaining his BSc degree in 1927. He was a keen and proficient baseballer and cricketer. In later years, like his father, he became a bowls aficionado.

He worked for several years as demonstrator in the university's Chemistry department before in 1934 securing an appointment as assistant lecturer at the University of Sydney.

At the outbreak of WWII he was on a working holiday in England, under Professor Sir Robert Robinson at Oxford University, when he was commissioned to undertake war-related research by the Ministry of Supply, which entailed an extension of his leave to August 1940. On his return to Sydney he did further war-related work alongside V. M. Trikojus.

In 1944 he was promoted to Senior Lecturer in Organic Chemistry at Sydney University, and during the absence of Dr John Campbell Earl in 1946 acted as Professor of Organic Chemistry in his place.

In 1954 was awarded a DSc by the University of Adelaide in recognition of his research.

His death at the age of 46 was sudden and unexpected.

== Family ==
Hughes married Jean McKenzie of Junee, New South Wales. McKenzie was a nurse, Matron of the Dental Hospital in Sydney. No children were born of the marriage.
