= Women's Suffrage League =

Organization of Australian suffragists

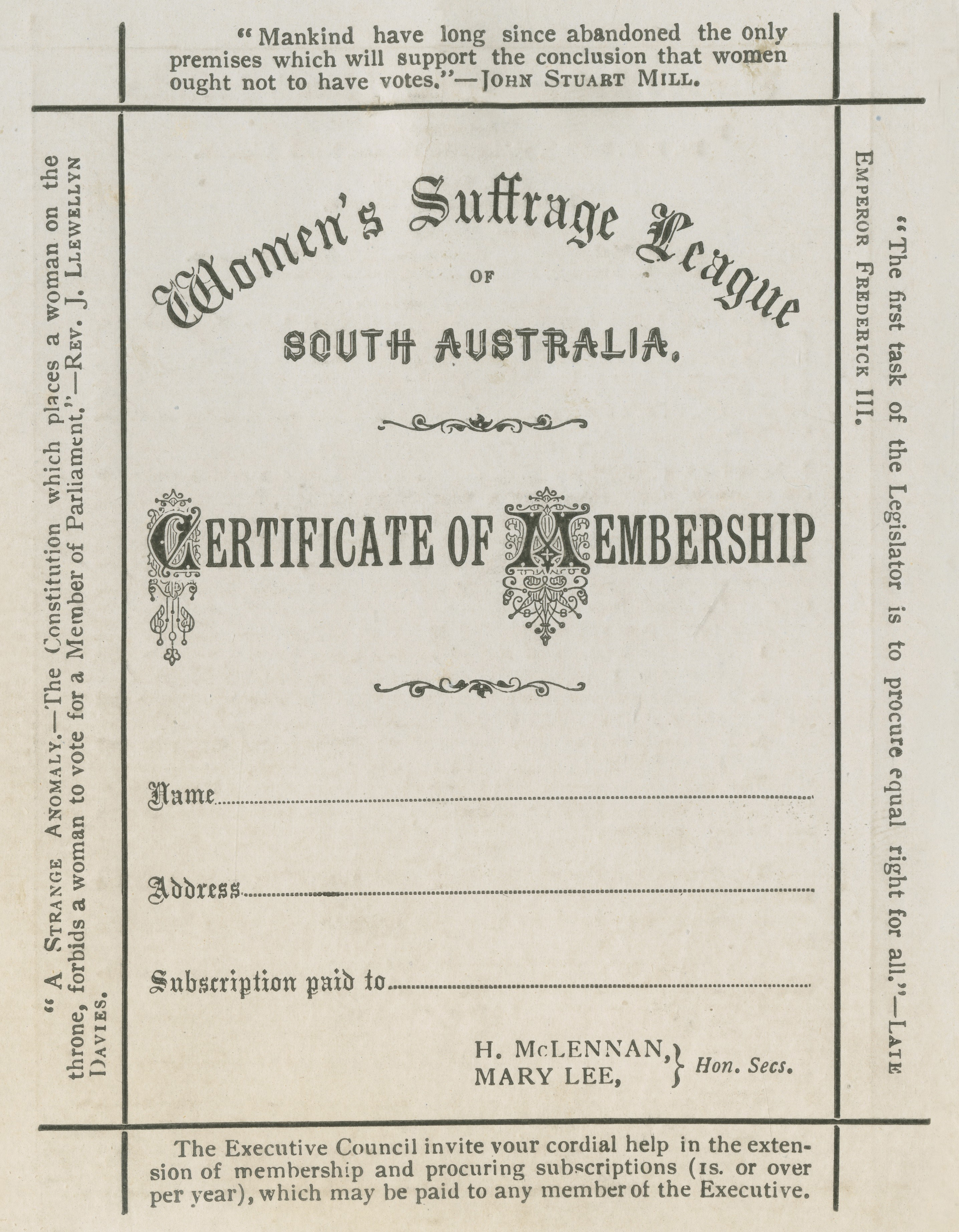
Membership form for the Women's Suffrage League of South Australia

The Women's Suffrage League, founded in 1888, spearheaded the campaign for women's right to vote in South Australia. In 1894 South Australia became the first Australian colony and the fourth place in the world to grant women's suffrage. At the same time women were granted the right to stand for election to Parliament, the first place in the world.

== History ==
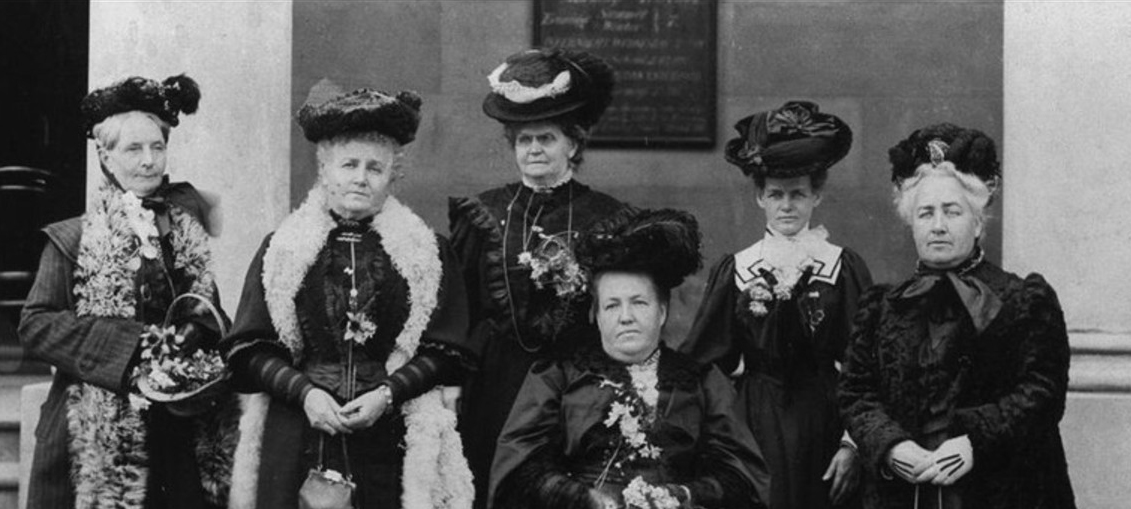
Social Purity Society

The Women's Suffrage League evolved from the Social Purity Society, an organisation that was concerned about the social and economic difficulties many women faced. The Society campaigned for fairer treatment of women by the law, and greater legal protection for young women. Thanks to the Society the age of consent for girls was raised to 16 and the age of young people in brothels was regulated.

Members of the Society and similar movements of the period, notably temperance advocates including the Woman's Christian Temperance Union, realised that the key to affecting social change was parliamentary representation. This led the establishment of the Women's Suffrage League of South Australia with the view of initiating a movement for the enfranchisement of women. Their first meeting was held on 20 July 1888 at the Adelaide YMCA rooms, with about 80 women in attendance along with members of parliament, religious leaders and others. Edward Charles Stirling was appointed as the first chairman of the League, with Mary Lee and Hector McLennan co-secretaries and Rose Birks treasurer. The first female president was Mary Colton, appointed in 1891.

Members of the League were instrumental in collecting signatures from across the colony, resulting in the largest petition ever presented to the Parliament of South Australia, 400 feet (120 m) long with over 11,600 signatures, which was presented to the parliament by George Stanley Hawker in August 1894. In December, the Constitutional Amendment (Adult Suffrage) Act 1894 was passed, which gave women not only the right to vote but the right to stand for parliament.

== Key members ==
Those key to the suffrage movement in South Australia included:

- Mary Colton, President
- Mary Lee, Secretary
- Rosetta Jane Birks, Treasurer
- Serena Lake
- Elizabeth Webb Nicholls
- Catherine Helen Spence
- Augusta Zadow

The nature of society at the time meant that the role of men was vital for the success of the campaign for women's suffrage. Key men included:

- Sir Edward Stirling, President until 1892
- Hector McLennan, Co-secretary with Mary Lee
- Robert Caldwell MHA
- Sylvanus James Magarey
- Joseph Coles Kirby.

== See also ==
- Women's suffrage in Australia
- Temperance movement in Australia
- Womanhood Suffrage League of New South Wales
