= Mary Colton =

Australian philanthropist and suffragist

- Mary, Lady Colton
- Born: Mary Cutting; 6 December 1822; London, England
- Died: 30 July 1898 (aged 75); Adelaide, Australia
- Occupations: Philanthropist and suffragist
- Spouse: John Colton (m. 1844)

Mary Colton (née Cutting; from 1891, Lady Colton; 6 December 1822 – 30 July 1898), was an Australian philanthropist and suffragist.

== Early life and family ==
Colton was born in London, England, the eldest of three children of Samuel Cutting, bootmaker, and his wife Hannah. In 1839, she emigrated with her widowed father, her brother Alfred and sister Hannah to Adelaide, South Australia, aboard Orleana, arriving in June 1840. In 1844, Colton married (later Sir) John Colton, saddler, hardware merchant and politician. Colton had nine children, several of whom died in infancy, with her last child being born in 1865.

== Philanthropy ==
Colton worked tirelessly for the poor and vulnerable, especially women and children. A committed Methodist, Mary began her philanthropy with the church's Dorcas Society, the South Adelaide Wesleyan Ladies' Working Society and the Nursing Sisters' Association. In the 1860s, she served on the ladies' committee that managed the practical affairs of the Servant's Home, a facility for newly arrived female immigrants and servants awaiting employment. In 1867, she joined the ladies' committee of the Female Refuge, which sheltered single pregnant girls, reformed sex workers, deserted wives and victims of violence. In 1876, she was a founder of the Adelaide Children's Hospital and remained on the board of management for the rest of her life. Colton actively contributed to 22 causes in her public work, as well as contributing to the lives of many in a private capacity, including the Home for Incurables; the Maternity Relief Association; and the Strangers' Friend Society. In the 1880s and 1890s, as president of the Adelaide Female Reformatory, she visited women prisoners and assisted them on discharge.

== Social activism ==
In 1870 and in 1872, Colton joined deputations pressing the South Australian government to end institutional care and to introduce boarding-out for state children. After they succeeded in 1872, Colton worked on the Boarding-out Society's committee, then on the pioneering State Children's Council which was responsible for children cared for by licensed foster parents, in reformatories or in industrial schools (reform schools, mostly for neglected children). In 1883 she became treasurer and then president of the new ladies' division of the Social Purity Society, which successfully campaigned to have the age of consent raised from the age of 12.

== Young Women's Christian Association (YWCA) ==
Colton worked with young women all her life and was particularly concerned for the welfare of girls with no family home. In 1884, she co-founded a club with a Christian focus for working girls which in December that year became a branch of the Young Women's Christian Association (YWCA). Colton remained president of the YWCA for the remainder of her life opening city residential premises and suburban branches and successfully extending religious meetings, clubs and classes to supplement work of the churches.

== Women's Suffrage League ==
In May 1892, Colton succeeded Edward Stirling as the President of the Women's Suffrage League where she guided it "through all difficulties and discouragements". The magnitude of her efforts for others had made her widely known and respected and this undoubtedly influenced some opinion to support the women's suffrage platform. Colton was applauded warmly when the league met to dissolve itself after the suffrage legislation was gazetted in March 1895.

== Later life ==
After her husband was knighted in 1891, she became Mary, Lady Colton. She died at her home on 30 July 1898, aged 75, and is buried in West Terrace cemetery; she was survived by her husband, one daughter and four of her sons. The Colton Ward at the Women's and Children's Hospital and Lady Colton Hall in the 1900 YWCA building on Hindmarsh Square were named in her honour.
