= W. G. Clarke =

Methodist minister (1859–1943)

William George Clarke (1859 – 4 November 1943), commonly W. G. Clarke, was a Methodist minister in South Australia. His eldest son, William Glensyl Clarke (1888–1965), commonly W. Glen Clarke but frequently W. G. Clarke, was also a South Australian Methodist minister. Each was president of the South Australian Methodist Conference (Note: President of the Methodist Conference for each year was by tradition also made honorary president of Prince Alfred College.) (1909–1910) and (1953–1954) respectively.

== History ==
Clarke was born in Yankalilla, South Australia, the son of George Clarke and Ellen Clarke, farmers of Wattle Flat, about whom nothing further has been found.

He was prominent in the Total Abstinence Society and Sunday School attached to the Norwood Wesleyan church. In 1882 he was selected as a candidate for training as a Wesleyan Methodist minister and awarded a year's education at Prince Alfred College (PAC). He began his ministry in 1883 at Moonta Mines.

He was a leading temperance worker, and a strong debater in the Methodist Conference, of which he was a member for 60 years. He preached in the usual range of circuits, according to the Methodist peripatetic principle: Glenelg 1885–1887, Port Pirie 1887–1890, Naracoorte 1891–1892, Pirie Street 1893–1895, Laura 1896–1899, Kooringa 1899–1902, Glenelg again 1903–1905, Mile End 1909–1910, Unley 1910–1912, and Kent Town 1912–1916. He held many church offices, and was secretary of the Memorial Hospital for a year. In 1907 he was secretary of the Methodist Conference, vice-president in 1908 and president in 1909. He was editor of the Australian Christian Commonwealth 1911 to 1914, retiring due to ill-health.

He was president of the South Australian Alliance, aka Prohibition League, (1924–1930) and South Australian Alliance (March 1934 – October 1934)

In 1919 he was appointed conference overseas mission secretary. He was made a supernumerary in 1924. He was the subject of a touching tribute in 1939.

== Family ==
On 8 September 1887 William George Clarke (1859 – 4 November 1943) married Emily Maria Nock (1867 – 8 June 1923) of Glensyl Villa, Glenelg. They had four sons and one daughter:

- Rev. William Glensyl Clarke (5 September 1888 – 16 April 1968) educated at PAC. He served as army chaplain from February 1915 He married Edith Emily Swann (14 March 1893 – 22 June 1982) on 31 March 1915. Their children include:

- Erica Doreen Clarke (18 February 1916 – 1999)
- Brian Glensyl Clarke (22 July 1921 – 2020)
- John Desmond Clarke (1923–2015)
- Trevor Keith Clarke (1925–1995)

- Ruby Albyn Nock Clarke (1890–1971) married William John Clark on 9 April 1912
- Cecil Roy Clarke (27 July 1892 – 1985)
- (Laurence) Eric Clarke (8 June 1895 – 1985) married Olive Maslin on 29 August 1916
- Norman Ray Clarke (10 November 1897 – 1947)

They had a home at Northgate street, Unley Park.

He died at the Memorial Hospital after an illness of about two months.
