= Sleath =

Sleath is a surname. Notable people by that name include:

- Danny Sleath (born 1986), English footballer
- David Sleath, chief executive of SEGRO plc
- Eleanor Sleath (1770–1847), English novelist
- Gabriel Sleath (1674–1756), London gold- and silversmith
- John Sleath (1767–1847), English cleric, High Master of St Paul's School, London
- Richard Sleath (1863–1922), Australian politician
- William Boultbee Sleath (c. 1763–1843), English teacher and clergyman

== See also ==
- Sleath Farmhouse, Llangua, Monmouthshire, a 16th-century farmhouse
