= George Stanley Hawker =

Australian politician

George Stanley Hawker (7 May 1894 – 17 February 1979) was an Australian politician who represented the South Australian House of Assembly seat of Burra from 1947 to 1956 for the Liberal and Country League. Hawker presented to parliament the South Australian Women's Suffrage Petition during the debate that passed the Constitutional Amendment (Adult Suffrage) Act 1894.
