= South Australian Alliance =

The South Australian Alliance was a Protestant Christian temperance organisation in the colony and state of South Australia.

== History ==
The South Australian Total Abstinence Society (founded 1840) became The South Australian Temperance Alliance in 1867. The South Australian Temperance Alliance became the South Australian Alliance in 1885. The change was largely ignored, and later references to the S.A. Temperance Alliance were many and frequent. In 1925 the members changed its name again, to the South Australian Prohibition League. It held its 42nd Annual General Meeting in November 1926. In 1932 the title of the organisation was amended to ""The South Australian Alliance for the Abolition of the Liquor Traffic by the Will of the People" or, in short, reverted to South Australian Alliance.

=== Presidents of the association ===
include:

- Rev. T. H. Smeaton (died 1927), years 1920–1924
- Rev. W. G. Clarke, 1925–1930, 1934–1935, 1940
- Rev. Fred W. Dinnis (died 1940), 1931–1933, 1936–1940
- Rev. Frank Lade (died 1948), 1941–1945

Other notable members include

Rev. H. Estcourt Hughes, S. W. Jeffries W. F. Finlayson; V. E. Stanton was secretary for nine years; replaced in 1923 by Albert Keeling.

== Some Activities ==
=== Early closing ===
At the start of the 20th century, the closing time for shops was 6 pm but for hotel bars it was 11 pm. The Alliance could see no reason why publicans should be so advantaged and argued that late closing was responsible for a lot of public drunkenness. In 1913 the Alliance circulated several petitions: one calling for hotel bars to close at 6 pm, and another ("no licence") that all liquor licences be cancelled. Parliament took the petition so seriously that a referendum or plebiscite was promised for 1915 in conjunction with the general election. A joint representation of the Council of Churches and the Alliance failed to convince Premier Peake, (a teetotaler Presbyterian) to implement early closing as an emergency response to the outbreak of war and the drought. The referendum was presented to voters as a choice of six options: 6, 7, 8, 9, 10, or 11 pm closing, and the 6 pm option triumphed. The Licensing Act Amendment bill was passed by the House of Assembly in August 1915 ratified by the Legislative Council in December and came into operation in March 1916 with the renewal of licences. An unintended consequence was the "six o'clock swill", in which bar patrons imbibed heavily as the hour approached, sometimes purchasing multiple drinks for consumption after the bar closed.

=== Local option ===
Around 1885 the SA Alliance adopted as policy "Local option" voting, whereby ratepayers get to vote as to whether their number of licensed venues in their region be increased or decreased, and by how many. One scheme has voting to take place every three years, with increase or reduction in numbers requiring a 2/3 majority, otherwise the status quo obtains; other schemes are possible. Criticised as "tyranny of the majority", it was expected eventually to result in "dry" regions, but failed to arrest march of hotels.

=== Magazine ===
The Patriot, official organ of the South Australian (Temperance) Alliance was founded in 1907 or earlier, and for six years edited by Rev. Delehanty (died 1920), secretary of the Alliance. It is likely he was succeeded as editor by Victor E. Stanton but no mention of the paper has been found for the years 1915–1919.

In 1920 it was revived as a weekly and edited by Rev. Frank Lade He was succeeded briefly by Rev. R. Ambrose Roberts, then Estcourt Hughes for a little over four years (1923–1927) and William George Clarke for the years 1928 and 1936–1940 (when he was sued for slander by Stanley Whitford), and Frank Lade again.
