= Joseph Coles Kirby =

Australian suffragist (1837–1924)

- Minister of the Congregational Church, Port Adelaide
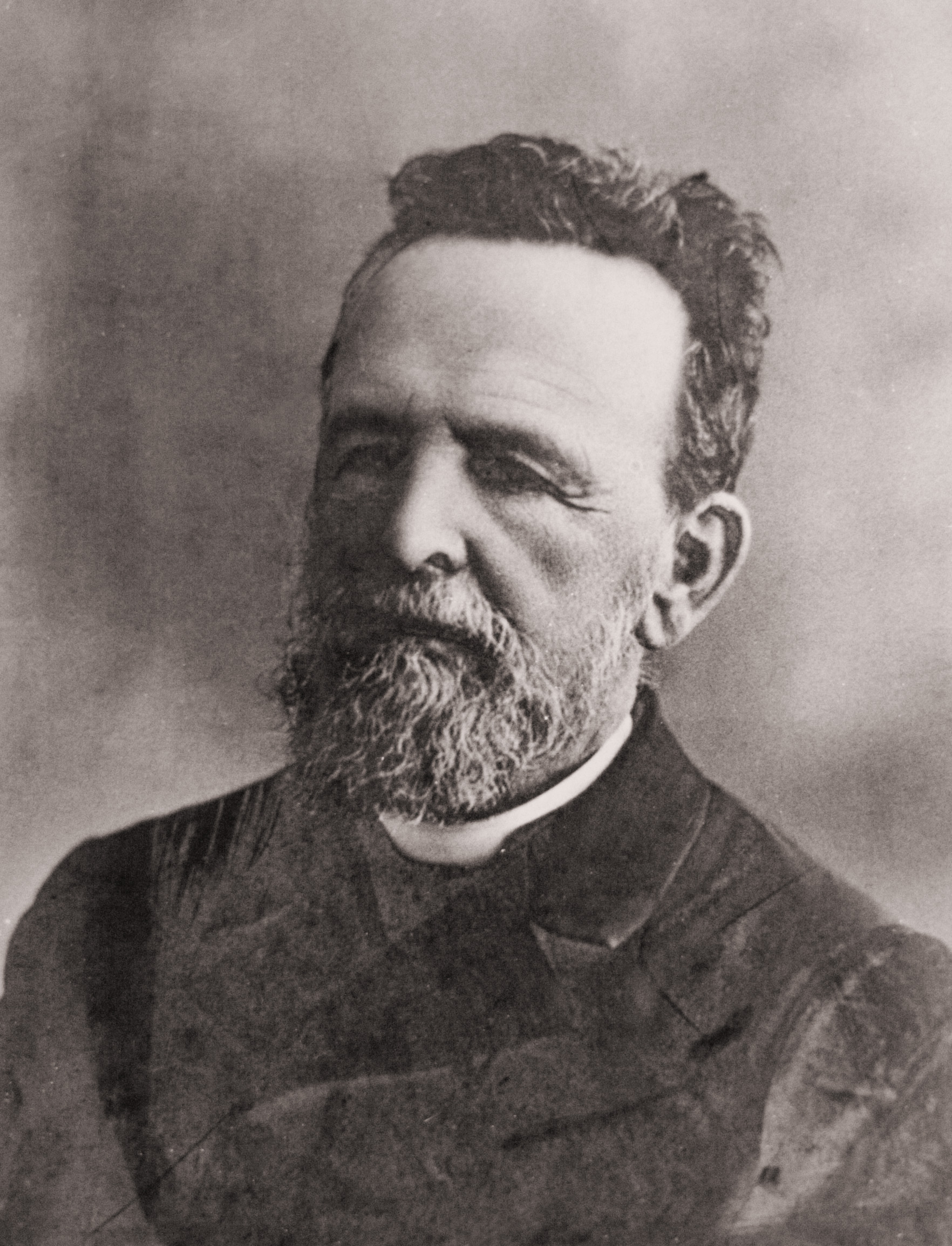
- Kirby, c. 1890, as minister of the Congregational Church, Port Adelaide
- Church: Congregational Church
- Installed: 1880
- Term ended: 1908
- Other posts: Chairman, Congregational Union of South Australia (1886, 1906); Chairman, Congregational Union of Australia and New Zealand (1910–1913); President, Council of Churches in South Australia (1910)
- Previous posts: Minister, Dalby, Queensland (1864–1871); Pastor, Ocean Street Congregational Church, Woollahra (1871–1877)

Orders
- Ordination: February 1864

Personal details
- Born: June 10, 1837 Castle Mills, Buckingham, Buckinghamshire, England
- Died: August 1, 1924 (aged 87) Semaphore, South Australia
- Buried: Cheltenham Cemetery, South Australia
- Denomination: Congregationalist
- Spouse: Margaretta Kirby(née Hall; died 1909)
- Children: 5 (two sons, three daughters)
- Occupation: Minister of religion; social reformer
- Education: Sibford School

Joseph Coles Kirby (10 June 1837 – 1 August 1924) was an English flour miller who migrated to Sydney, Australia in 1854. In 1864, Kirby was ordained in the Congregational Churches and then ministered to rural and city congregations in Queensland and South Australia and supported or led many causes for social reform such as the temperance movement, women's suffrage and "social purity", raising the age of consent to 16 in Australia.

== Early life ==
Kirby was born on 10 June 1837 at Castle Mills, Buckingham, England to John and Mary (née Coles) Kirby. Educated at Sibford School, a Quaker boarding school in Oxfordshire, the young Kirby inherited his mother's concern for social reform which would shape his later life. At 13 he entered his father's flour-milling business but always loved reading and had a passion for self-improvement.

== Migration to Sydney ==
The family migrated to Sydney in 1854 when his father's business went bankrupt but the 17-year-old Kirby was able to find work at another flour-mill in Sydney. It was in Sydney that he joined the Pitt Street Congregational Church where the members at that time included David Jones, John Fairfax and Rev. John West. Here Kirby criticised the dominant social groups in New South Wales and advocated total abstinence.

== Ministry ==
=== Early Ministry in Queensland ===
Kirby received his ministerial training from Rev. B. Quaife and was called as assistant minister at Ipswich, Queensland in 1863. In 1864 he was ordained and became a Congregational Minister at Dalby in Queensland. It was here in Dalby that he married Margaretta Hall.

While in Queensland he became aware of the policy of large property owners replacing "white" labourers with "kanakas" imported from New Britain and New Ireland, who were prepared to work for lower wages. As a result of church activism, a compromise was reached where hiring of "kanakas" was restricted to sugar farmers. He came to the conclusion, enumerated late in life, of the value of the White Australia policy in avoiding racial conflict.

=== Ministry in New South Wales ===
From 1871 to 1877, Kirby was the pastor of the Congregational Church in Woollahra, Sydney. During this time he was active within the community, supporting the Public Schools League's campaign for free, compulsory secular education and campaigning for the temperance movement. Kirby took over the church extension work of the Congregational Union of New South Wales in 1877 and was chairman of the Union in for two years in 1879-80. As chairman he attacked academicism in the ministry and advocated stronger central initiative in home missions and acceptance of land from the government to build new churches.

=== Ministry in South Australia ===
In 1880 he was called to the Port Adelaide Congregational Church after the previous minister died of tuberculosis. Kirby started the Young Christians' Union, the Young Men's Christian Society here and, through his assiduous work campaigning and ministry, was able to bring his denomination solidly behind temperance, Women's Suffrage and social reform.

While still the minister of the Port Adelaide church, Kirby became secretary of the Social Purity Society in 1882 and spent time in Melbourne and Sydney advocating temperance and women's suffrage. In 1885 he won ecumenical support in a campaign to raise the age of consent in Australia from 13 to 16.

In 1886 and 1906 Kirby was the chairman of the Congregational Union of South Australia and from 1910 to 1913 was the chairman of the Congregation Union of Australia and New Zealand. In 1891 he had been an Australian representative at the first International Congregational Council in London. During this trip he travelled Europe and India.

He was an advocate for ecumenism, and in 1910 was elected president of the Council of Churches in South Australia.

== Final Years ==
In 1915 Kirby was the leader in the successful campaign for 6 o'clock closing of hotel bars. Kirby also supported religious instruction in state schools and helped persuade the South Australian Congregational Union to abandon its insistence upon purely secular instruction. Later, he promoted Aboriginal protection and was an advocate of an Aboriginal reserve in Arnhem land. Although deeply devoted to the Bible and opposing any criticism of it, Kirby was open minded towards Darwinism and eugenics.

Kirby died 1 August 1924 in Semaphore, South Australia, survived by two sons and three daughters.

== Recognition ==
On 22 November 1926 a memorial window was installed in the Congregational Church, Port Adelaide, dedicated to Margaretta and Joseph Coles Kirby in recognition of his years of service as pastor 1880 to 1908, was unveiled by their son Bevan Kirby. The window, a stained-glass work depicting the "Good Shepherd" was the work of artisans at A. E. Clarkson Ltd., Adelaide.

From 1986, the Port Dock Brewery Hotel in Port Adelaide produced an ale named Old Preacher, referencing Kirby, who successfully campaigned for the original hotel to be closed down in 1909.

== Family ==
Kirby married Margaretta Hall (died 21 April 1909) at Dalby, Queensland. Their children include

- (John) Montague Kirby (c. 1867 – 7 July 1942) married Rosalie Laura Faulkner on 16 June 1893. divorced in 1911. He was a journalist on the Register and the Sydney Morning Herald.
- Margaretta "Ettie" Kirby (1869 – 12 September 1941)
- Mary Maude Kirby (c. 1871 – 16 January 1950) married John Nicholas on 27 January 1898; lived in Perth, W.A.
- Grace Mildred Kirby (1877–1950), educated at Ladies' Collegiate School, Semaphore. She married Arthur Green Urquhart in 1947.
- Bevan Kirby (1881 – 2 January 1949), married Martha Young on 17 August 1910. He was a pharmacist at Port Adelaide

== See also ==
- Temperance movement
- Port Adelaide Uniting Church
- Six o'clock swill
