= Mary Lee (suffragist) =

Irish-Australian suffragette

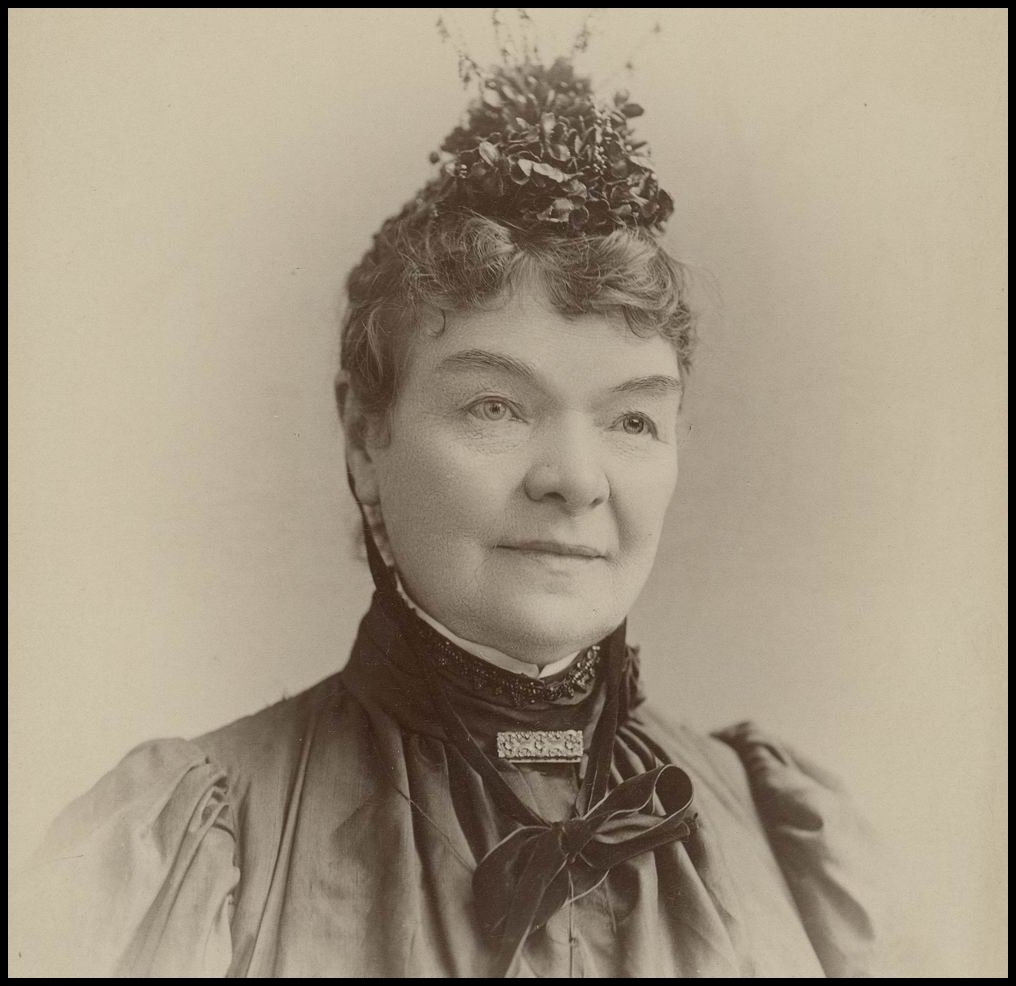
- Born: Mary Walsh; 14 February 1821; County Monaghan, Ireland
- Died: 18 September 1909 (aged 88); North Adelaide, Australia
- Years active: 1883–1896
- Known for: Women's suffrage in South Australia
- Spouse: George Lee (m. 1844)
- Children: 7

Mary Lee (née Walsh) (14 February 1821 – 18 September 1909) was an Irish-Australian suffragist and social reformer in South Australia.

== Early life ==
Mary Lee was born in Ireland at Kilknock Estate in the county of Monaghan. She was married in 1844 to George Lee. The couple had seven children and a 2018 biography gives details of her life in Ireland, notably running a school for girls. Her son John Benjamin Stedham "Ben" Lee moved to Adelaide, South Australia. When he fell ill in 1879, Lee, now a widow, and her daughter, Evelyn, immigrated to Adelaide aboard the steamship Orient on its maiden voyage. Ben died on 2 November 1880.

== Australia ==
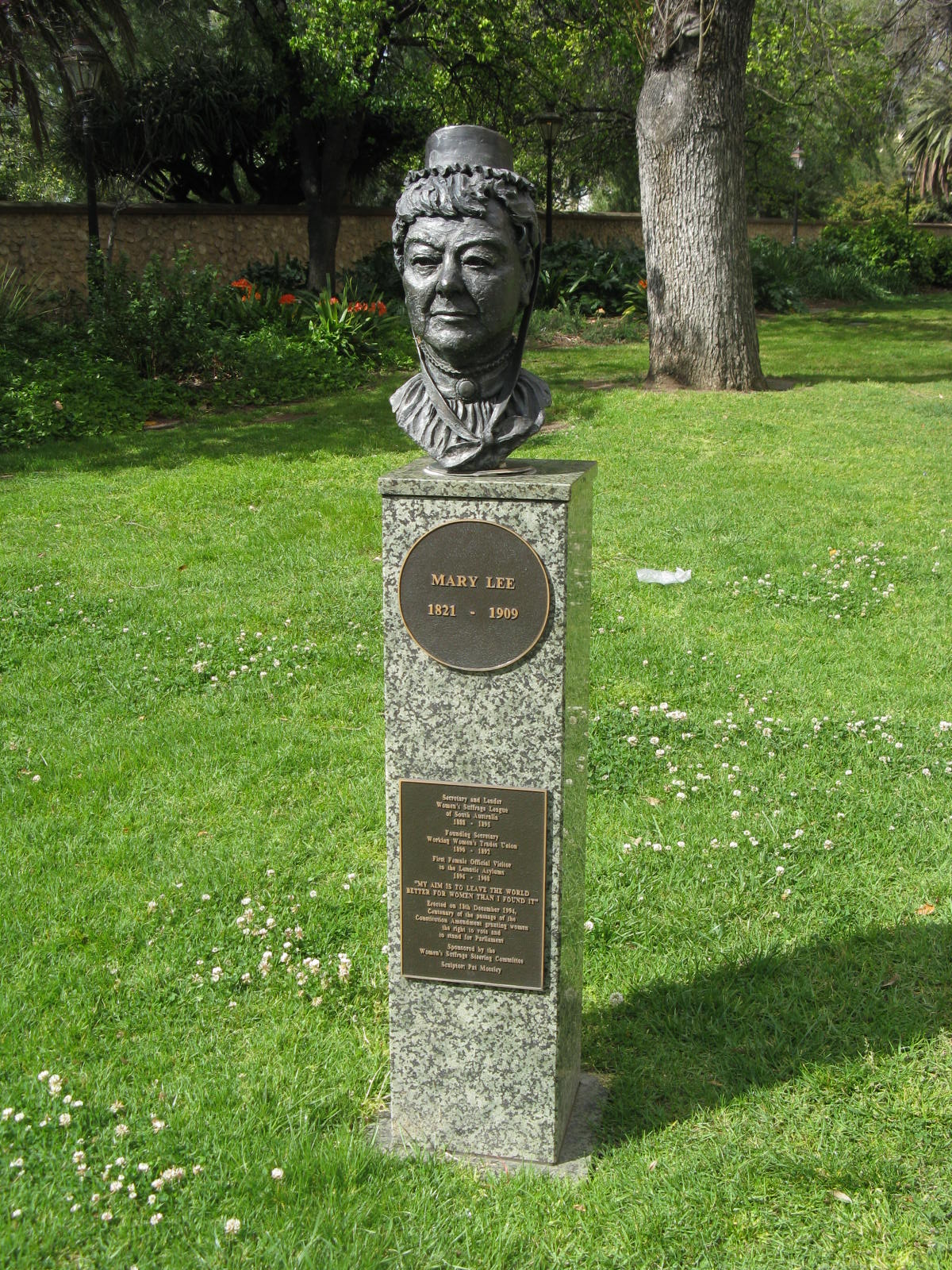
Bust, North Terrace, Adelaide.

In 1883 Mary Lee became active in the ladies' committee of the Social Purity Society of the reverend Joseph Coles Kirby. The Society advocated changes to the law relating to the social and legal status of young women, advocating an end to child labour to protect girls from abuse and preventing them from becoming prostitutes or child brides. The group's success was a passage in the 1885 Criminal Law Consolidation Amendment Act that raised the age of consent from 13 to 16, i.e., which made it illegal for a man to have sex with a girl under 16. Kirby credited Lee for this success.

The Social Purity Society also was concerned with the working conditions of women. After the bill was passed in 1885 the group began campaigning for workers' rights. In December 1889 at a public meeting Lee proposed the formation of a women's trade union. The Working Women's Trades Union was founded in 1890, Mary Lee was the union's secretary for two years. In 1893 Lee attended the Trades and Labor Council meetings, served on the sub-committee which examined conditions in the clothing industry, and on the Distressed Women and Children's Committee which distributed clothes and food to the families hit by the economic depression of the 1890s.

On 13 July 1888 Lee, the Social Purity League, and others met and formed the South Australian Women's Suffrage League. She was the League's co-honorary secretary and for six and half years she fought for women's suffrage. Her own letters and reports of her speeches show that she was an astute and logical woman, employing sound argument, wit and humour in her correspondence and public speaking. In 1889 she wrote:

Let husbands, brothers, fathers, be kept in mind that it is the duty of every free man to leave his daughters as free as his sons. -as women assist in maintaining Government they have a right to a say how and by whom they shall be governed. Nineteenth century civilisation has accorded to women the same political status as to the idiot and the criminal. Such is the basis of our reverence for the person of women and of our estimate of her work.

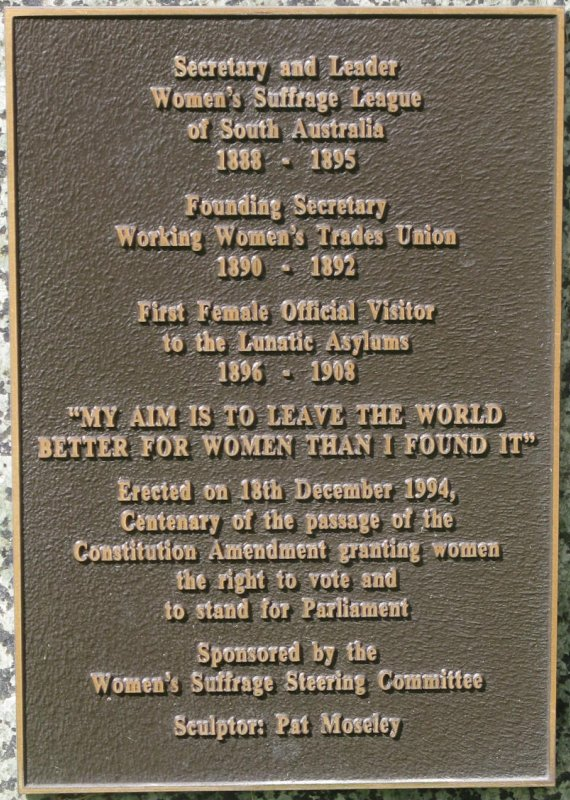

Lee was active in advocating the rights of the working class, publishing the following thoughts in The Barrier Miner in respect of the 1892 Broken Hill miners' strike:

... Sir, this strike has one feature which renders it more profoundly interesting than any of its predecessors...which must secure it a prominent and distinguished page when the history of these colonies shall be written. It is that the women of Broken Hill are the first great body of working women who have raised their voices in united protest against the glaring injustice that 'the present constitution will not allow them a voice in framing the laws ...'

Bills to grant women's suffrage were put forth in the South Australian parliament between 1889 and 1893, all failed. Spurred on by the grant of women's suffrage in New Zealand, Lee, the Social Purity League, the Woman's Christian Temperance Union and the Democratic League travelled all over South Australia, which included the Northern Territory at the time, collecting signatures on a petition. On 23 August 1894 when the Adult Suffrage Bill was read in the South Australian parliament, the women presented the great petition. The South Australian Women's Suffrage Petition contained 11,600 signatures, on paper sheets from all over the colony, that had been pasted together to make a roll 122 metres long. The bill, passed on 18 December 1894, granted women the right to vote and stand for parliament, and South Australia was the first legislation worldwide to do so.

Once women had the vote, Lee was active in voter education, encouraging women to enrol and vote. By her 75th birthday, 60,000 women had enrolled to vote. In 1895 she was nominated to stand for parliament but refused.

She was appointed to the honorary position of official visitor to the Lunatic Asylums in 1896, the only female so appointed. During this latter part of her life, Lee struggled financially and had to sell her library. She continued to correspond with women in other Australian states where suffrage was not yet granted.

She died in 1909 from pleurisy following influenza and was buried with her son Ben.

Mary Lee Close in the Canberra suburb of Bonython is named for her.

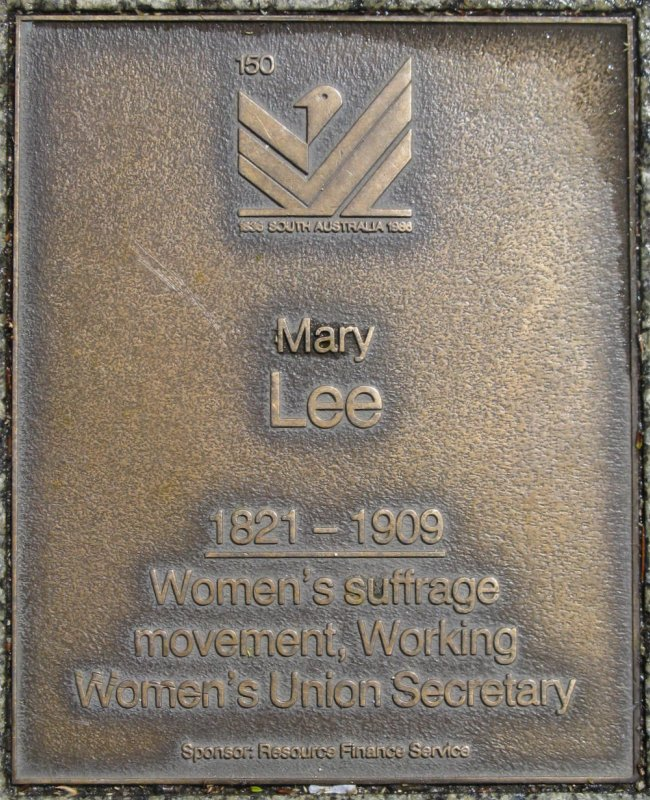
Plaque on the Jubilee 150 Walkway, Adelaide

In 1994, to mark the centenary of the enfranchisement of women in South Australia she was accorded recognition as a national hero. A special proof coin was issued by the mint in her honour. She was posthumously inducted onto the Victorian Honour Roll of Women in 2001.

A full-scale biography of Mary Lee by Denise George was published in 2018 and well reviewed.
