= Constitutional Amendment (Adult Suffrage) Act 1894 =

Act of the Parliament of South Australia

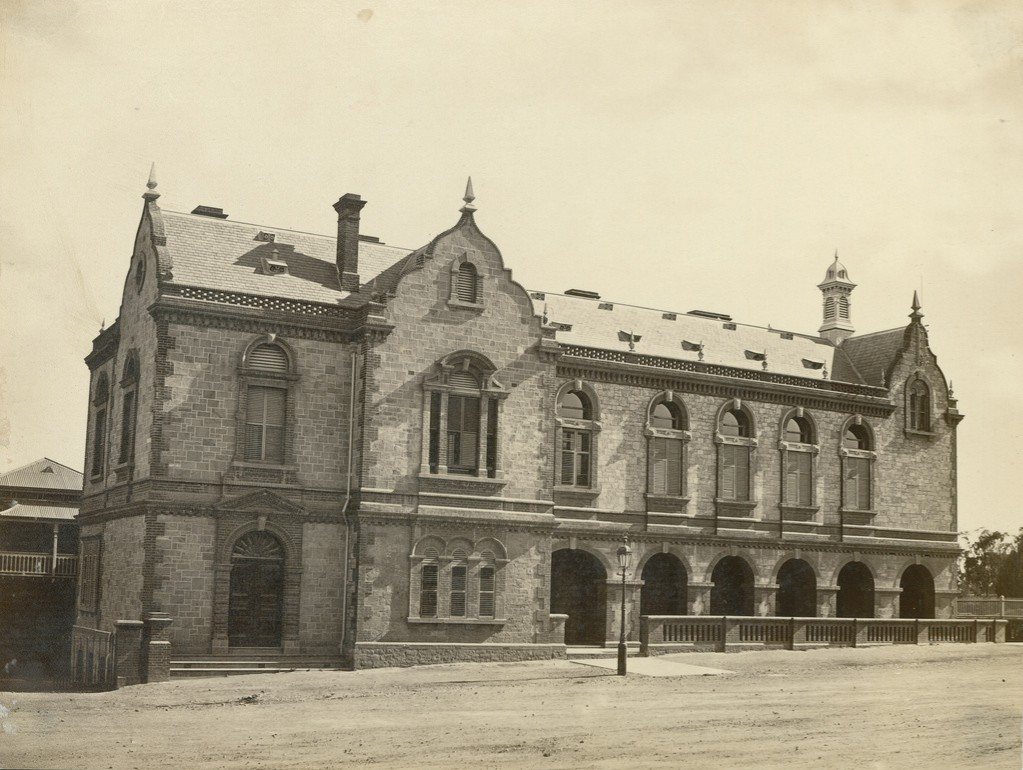

Parliament of South Australia
- Citation: Constitution Amendment Act (No 613 of 57 and 58 Vic, 1894)
- Territorial extent: South Australia
- Enacted: 18 December 1894
- Signed by: Queen Victoria
- Repealed: 1 January 1935
- Introduced by: John Hannah Gordon

Repealed by
- Constitution Act 1934
- Status: Repealed

The Constitutional Amendment (Adult Suffrage) Act 1894 was an Act of the Parliament of South Australia to amend the South Australian Constitution Act 1856 to include women's suffrage. It was the seventh attempt to introduce voting rights for women and received widespread public support including the largest petition ever presented to the South Australian parliament. The proposed legislation was amended during debate to include the right of women to stand for parliament after an opponent miscalculated that such a provision would cause the bill to be defeated. Once passed, South Australia become the fourth state in the world to give women the vote and the first to give women the right to be elected to parliament.

== Background ==
The first resolution in the South Australian House of Assembly to give women the vote was introduced by Sir Edward Charles Stirling in 1885, and was passed but not acted upon. Six bills were introduced unsuccessfully into Parliament over the but it never happened during the subsequent decade.

The campaign for women's right to vote in South Australia was led by the Women's Suffrage League, formed in 1888, with key suffragettes including Mary Lee, Mary Colton and Catherine Helen Spence. They collected signatures from across the colony, resulting in the South Australian Women's Suffrage Petition. This was the largest petition ever presented to the South Australian parliament, 400 feet (120 m) long with over 11,600 signatures, which was presented to the parliament by George Stanley Hawker.

== Passage ==
The Constitutional Amendment (Adult Suffrage) Bill was first presented to the Legislative Council by John Hannah Gordon on 23 August 1894. John Warren noted the common objection that the vote would "make women masculine" and John Darling said the Bill was "too much for him" as "Woman's place was at the head of the household, to adorn, and assist her husband..." Nevertheless, the third reading of the Bill was carried by 13 votes to 9.

Various amendments to the Bill were proposed during the ensuing debates, including restricting women from voting in the House of Assembly, restricting the vote to women over 25, and allowing women to vote by post in certain circumstances, all of which were defeated. The Act was initially only intended to extend the right of an adult male to vote to adult women. In an attempt to thwart the passage of the bill, Ebenezer Ward, an outspoken opponent of women's suffrage, moved an amendment in the upper house "to strike out Clause 4 barring women from being members of parliament". This would give women the right to stand for election, a right not even the suffragists had been arguing for. Ward's intention was that this would seem so "ridiculous" that the whole Bill would be voted out. His efforts have been dubbed a "great miscalculation", leading to South Australian women becoming at the time "the most enfranchised women anywhere in the world".

As the bill proposed constitutional amendment, a two-thirds majority was required to pass it into law. The bill was introduced for the third time by John Cockburn on 17 December and debate went on long into the night, with conservative members stonewalling. The bill was eventually passed in the House of Assembly on 18 December 1894, 31 votes to 14, with about 200 women present watching and cheering. It was given royal assent by Queen Victoria in March 1895.

== Effect ==
The Act was the first legislation in the world to grant the right for women to be elected to a parliament, and made the colony the fourth place in the world to give women the vote after the Isle of Man (1880), New Zealand (1893) and Colorado (1893).

The Act enfranchised female citizens of South Australia, including indigenous women. However, indigenous Australians who were not already on the electoral roll by 1901 were specifically excluded from voting after federation by the Commonwealth Franchise Act 1902, a right that was not restored until the Commonwealth Electoral Act was amended in 1962.

South Australian Premier Charles Kingston called the legislation the colony's "greatest constitutional reform", but Queen Victoria called it a "mad, wicked folly." South Australian women voted for the first time the year after the Act was passed, with a higher percentage of eligible women than men turning out to vote in the 1896 South Australian colonial election.

The first female political candidate in South Australia was Catherine Helen Spence, who was a candidate for the Federal Convention in 1897. The first women to stand for election to the parliament were Selina Siggins and Jeanne Young in the 1918 state election: both stood as independents and were unsuccessful. Ironically, South Australia was the last state in Australia to have a woman elected to state parliament, with the election in 1959 of Jessie Cooper to the Legislative Council and Joyce Steele to the House of Assembly. Nancy Buttfield had been elected to the federal Senate representing South Australia four years earlier at the 1955 Australian federal election.

The Act was repealed along with the 1856 Constitution and replaced by the Constitution Act 1934.
