= Alfred Tischbauer =

French born artist who worked in Australia and America (1853–1922)

Alfred Louis Tischbauer
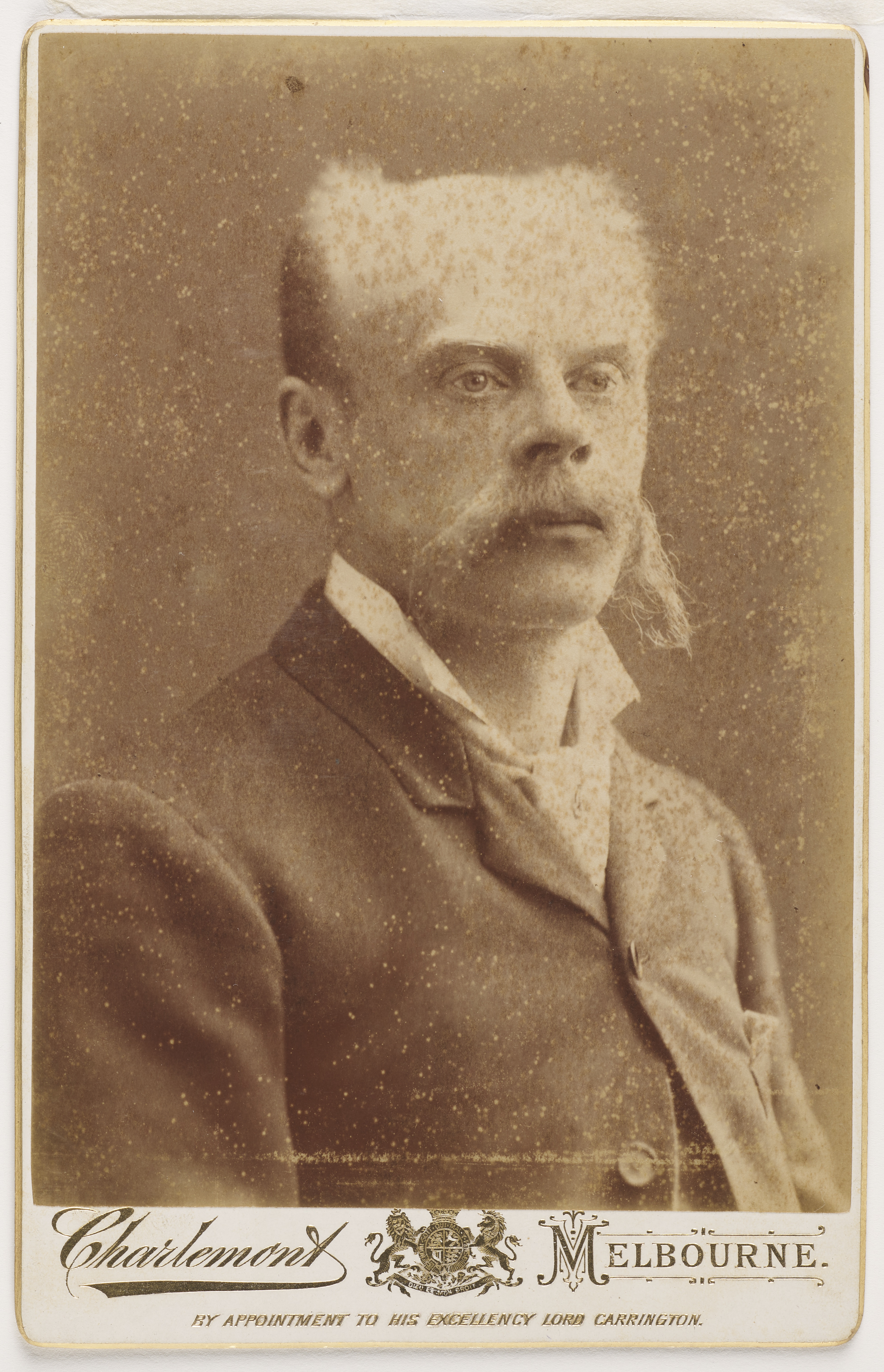
- Portrait of Alfred Tischbauer, Australia, 1896
- Born: Alfred Louis Tischbauer; 1853; Paris, France
- Died: February 1922 (aged 68–69); Forest Lawn Memorial Park, Hollywood Hills, United States of America
- Other names: Alf Tischbauer, Alta, Louis Tischbauer, Tish, Tischi
- Known for: paintings, perspective drawing, set design
- Spouse: Harriet Watson

Alfred Tischbauer was born in Paris, France, in 1853, and worked as a scene painter and designer for the Paris Opera. In 1871 he joined the ‘Paris Commune’ protests which led to him being convicted and transported to New Caledonia in 1871. After being released from prison there he came to Sydney sometime around August 1879. In that same year Tischbauer painted the decorations for the Victorian Court at the Sydney International Exhibition.

By 1880 Tischbauer was living at 139 Castlereagh Street, Sydney, and made 'Sketches in Water-colours for Churches and Apartments. Panels for Apartments’ for the Melbourne International Exhibition of that year. He also started teaching classes in perspective at the Sydney Technical College, Ultimo. In 1883 he sent a letter resigning from his position as drawing instructor and in 1889 resigned as teacher of perspective.

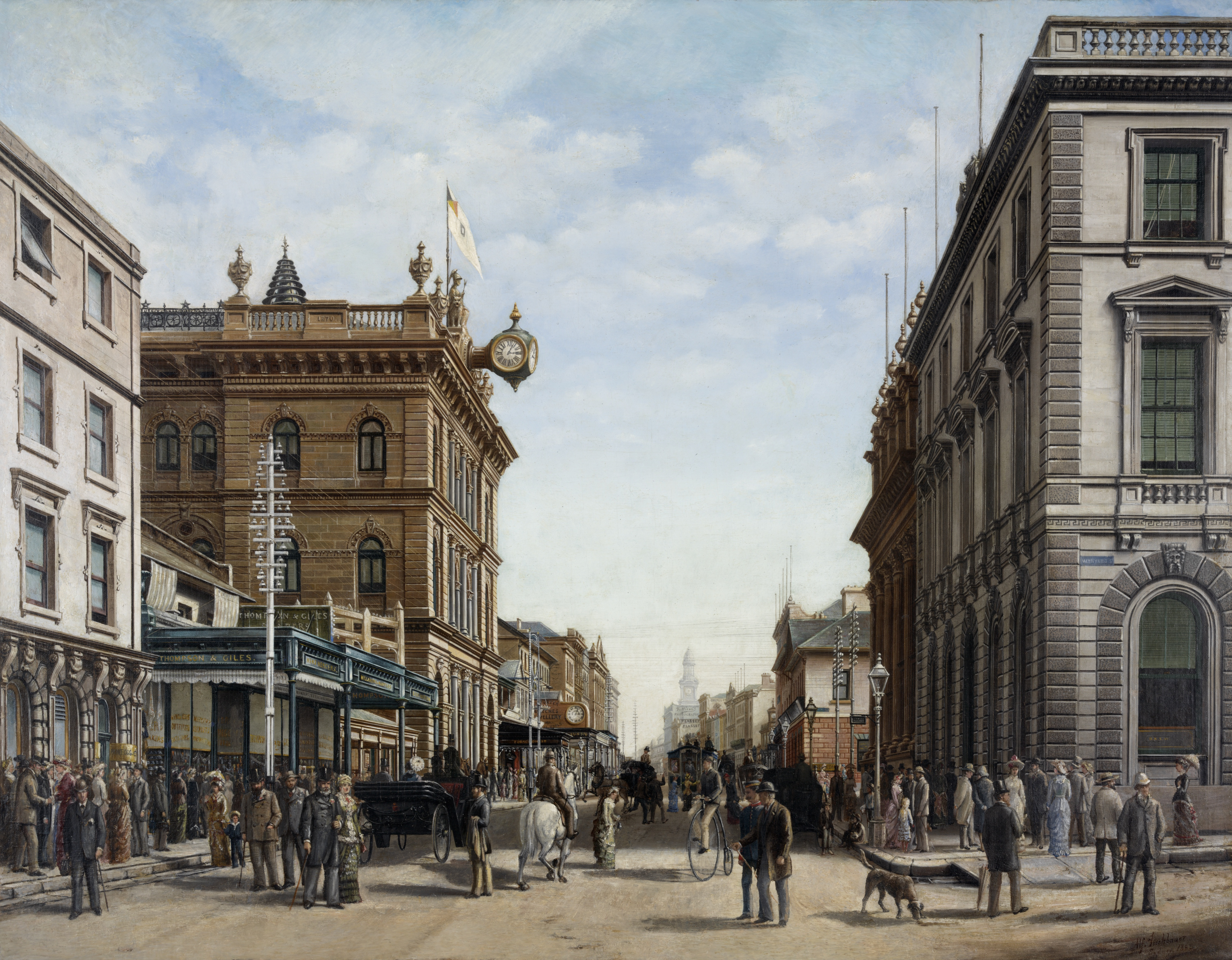
George Street, Sydney, 1883, by Alfred Tischbauer

In 1883 he showed an oil painting of George Street, Sydney, in the third annual NSW Art Society exhibition. This was held at the Sydney Town Hall, after being postponed by the destruction of the Garden Palace due to fire. This painting is now held by the Library of New South Wales. Two other known paintings depict the Art Gallery of NSW while in the fine arts’ building designed by W.W. Wardell. This had been erected at the entrance to the Botanic Gardens for the 1879–80 Sydney International Exhibition and escaped destruction in the 1882 fire that consumed the building.

Sometime around 1881 Tischbauer moved to Melbourne and worked, under the stage name 'Alta’, as a theatre designer for Alfred Dampier. He appeared in court in December 1881 after being named in the suicide of 25-year-old Selina Palmer also in the employ of Dampier. Questions were asked about his relationship to her but he was exonerated of any blame by the jury. Tischbauer was the chief scene-painter of the 'elaborately realistic’ scenery in ‘Marvellous Melbourne,’ which opened on 19 January 1889.

By 1893 he was also employed as a scenic painter at the 'Theatre Royal' by JH Rainford. In 1897 Tischbauer married Harriett Watson, youngest daughter of Archdeacon Canon Watson of Footscray, Melbourne. In 1898 he completed sets for the Bathurst School of Arts.

In 1911 Tischbauer moved to New York with Harriett. According to William Moore, he became a successful scenic artist and theatrical designer before later moving to California, to work for the American Film Company in Santa Barbara.

Alfred Louis Tischbauer died in Los Angeles in February 1922 and was buried in the Forest Lawn Memorial Park in the Hollywood Hills. Harriett Tischbauer returned to Australia and died in the New South Wales town of Ingleburn, on 14 June 1925.
